= Scam centers in Cambodia =

Clandestine fraud operations in Cambodia

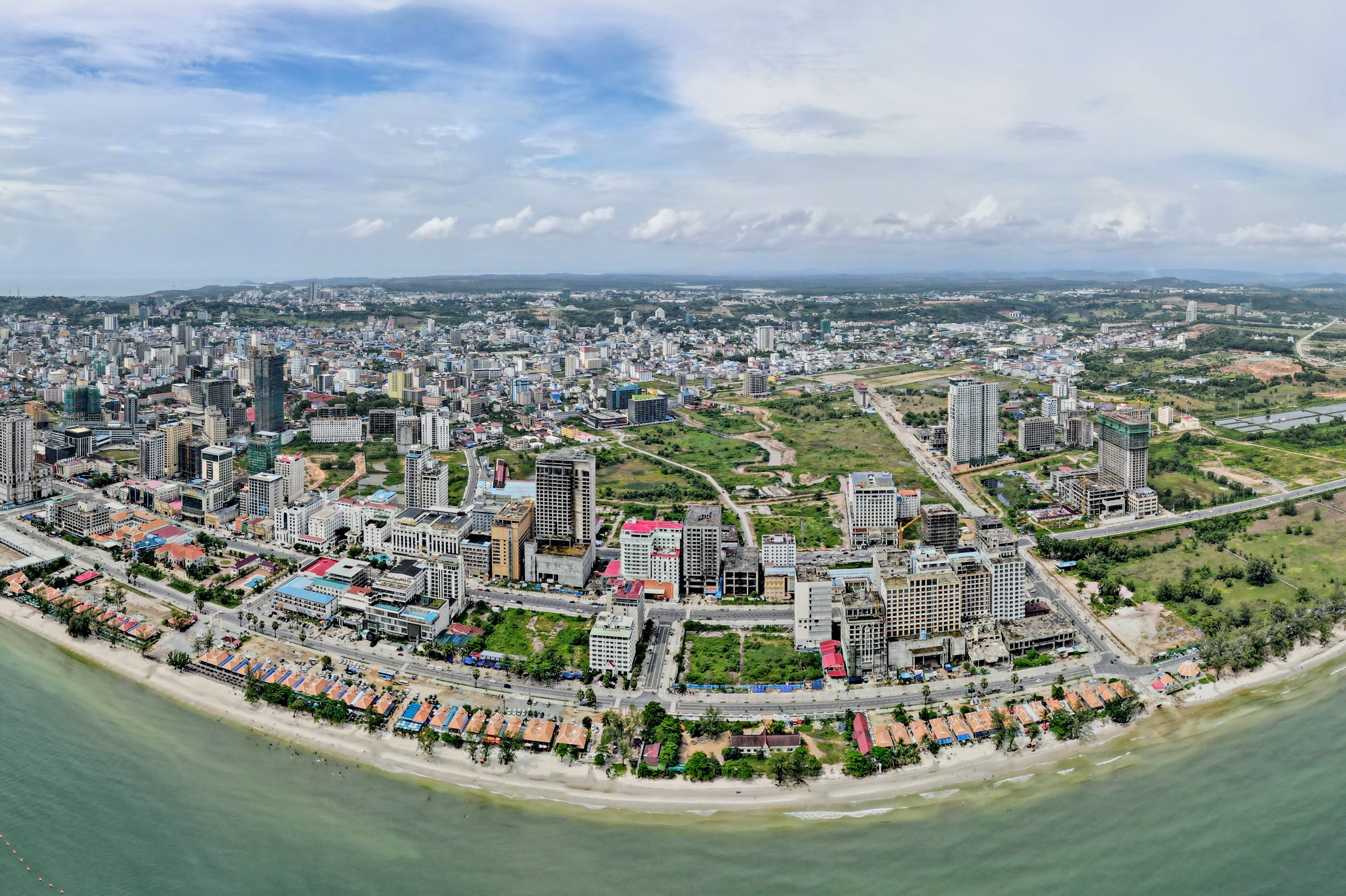
- Sihanoukville SEZ hosts scam centers in casinos, hotels, offices, and residences.
- Founded: c. 2021
- Years active: 2021–present
- Territory: Cambodia, specifically in Sihanoukville, Phnom Penh and Bavet municipality, among other areas
- Activities: Organized crime including: cybercrime, online fraud, human trafficking, child labour, forced labor, torture
- Allies: Various triads and other transnational criminal networks

Scam centers in Cambodia are clandestine fraud operations, controlled by international and organized criminal networks specializing in online fraud and operating in Cambodia. Policy analysis has characterized Cambodia as a global nexus and among the global epicenters of trafficking-linked transnational cyber-fraud, with scam networks recruiting coerced and voluntary workers from dozens of countries and targeting victims worldwide. The operations of organized crime in the country is a serious regional issue, and their activities are estimated to generate between $12.5 and $19 billion annually, a figure that could represent up to 35% of Cambodia's gross domestic product (GDP).

According to a 2024 United Nations (UN) report, an estimated 100,000 to 150,000 people, many of them foreign nationals deceived by fraudulent job offers, are believed to have been trafficked and held in Cambodian compounds where they are forced to engage in online scam operations under exploitative conditions. Across Cambodia, Myanmar and Laos, the cybercriminal labor force has been estimated to exceed 350,000 people, with conservative estimates placing annual revenue generated by regional scam syndicates at $50 to $75 billion.

Several non-governmental organizations (NGOs) and eyewitness accounts report cases of human trafficking, forced labor, torture, child exploitation and other forms of abuse from Cambodian scam centers. While these centers operate de jure in violation of Cambodian law, they are reportedly based openly in casinos, hotels, office buildings, or residential areas, including in cities such as Sihanoukville and the country's capital of Phnom Penh. According to various international reporting bodies, they appear to benefit from a degree of impunity, or even complicity, from various Cambodian officials.

== History ==
=== Legacy of corruption ===
Cambodia under Prime Minister Hun Sen and the Cambodian People's Party (CPP) has remained plagued by systemic and deeply entrenched corruption, which persisted even after the formal establishment of a democratic framework. In 2024, Cambodia ranked among the 25 most corrupt countries in the world, placing 22nd on Transparency International's Corruption Perceptions Index.

Hun Sen's rise to power in 1988—and subsequently of his son Hun Manet in 2023—was characterized by the consolidation of executive power, the centralization of economic resources among political elites, and the cultivation of close ties between senior government officials and criminal syndicates operating across Southeast Asia, particularly in the spheres of gambling, casino operations, and human trafficking. The United States Department of State has repeatedly denounced the Cambodian government's complicity with these networks, alleging that officials have shielded and financially profited from their activities.

This environment of corruption and political patronage has created fertile ground for the expansion of transnational criminal networks, including Chinese triads that have fled increased crackdowns in China since 2018. Many of these groups have established operations in special economic zones such as Sihanoukville, where lax regulation and political protection have enabled them to thrive.

=== Coercive patronage networks and a criminalized political economy ===
A 2025 policy report by Humanity Research Consultancy, based on interviews with dozens of scholars, diplomats, journalists, and civil society actors, described entrenched corruption as the most consistently cited enabling factor behind Cambodia's trafficking-linked online-scam industry. The report also identified reliable protection by government actors and co-perpetration by party elites as primary enablers of Cambodia's trafficking–cybercrime nexus and as major barriers to countermeasures. The report argued that corruption in this context is not limited to sporadic bribery, but is closely tied to patronage relationships between political elites and business interests, alongside the use of state coercive capacity to discourage challenges to the ruling order and protect high-rent economic activity.

The report also framed the rise of large-scale cyber-fraud in Cambodia as an adaptation of earlier rent-generating illicit and semi-illicit practices associated with politically connected networks. It described these networks as having shifted over time across revenue sources—including resource extraction and concession-linked business activity—before expanding into casino-linked development and, later, scam-compound operations that rely on trafficked labor.

Analyses of Cambodia's scam-compound economy have described a pattern in which foreign-led fraud networks operate through locally influential business patrons who control the land and buildings used for compounds. In these accounts, local patrons monetise real-estate holdings by providing premises, security, and politically mediated protection that can reduce the likelihood of sustained law-enforcement disruption, while foreign operators supply capital, management, and overseas targeting; senior investors and coordinators have been described as predominantly foreign, particularly from mainland China.

=== Effect of the COVID-19 pandemic ===
Historically concentrated in the casino sector, criminal networks operating in Cambodia were severely impacted by the 2019 adoption of a law tightening gambling regulations—specifically banning online gambling—and the COVID-19 pandemic, which led to a sharp decline in tourism, especially from China. Faced with economic losses, crime organizations involved in the Cambodian casino industry began collaborating with long-standing human trafficking networks in the country and gradually shifted their operations to online scams and the exploitation of forced labor. Following Cambodia's 2019 ban on online gambling, casino and hotel revenues in casino towns declined and scam operations expanded as an alternative revenue stream. During the COVID-19 pandemic, travel restrictions and the departure of many voluntary scam workers were associated with increased reliance on trafficked foreign nationals to staff scam compounds, including in repurposed casino- and hotel-linked facilities.

From 2021, several Cambodian establishments previously linked to online gambling, such as casinos and hotels (including some in major urban centers), were converted into online scam compounds. That same year, videos filmed inside some scam compounds showing employees subjected to physical abuse and torture were made public, drawing international media attention and concern. It's been argued that the pandemic-era shock to key sectors of Cambodia's economy increased the perceived value of rapid, high-liquidity revenue streams for elite patronage networks, and that this coincided with a period of political consolidation and succession politics in which access to capital was viewed as strategically important.

=== Crackdown from 2022 ===
Early enforcement efforts from 2022 have been described as intermittent and some prominent scam-linked sites resumed activity after raids, alongside an increasingly restrictive climate for local reporting and activism on the issue.

In 2022, several Cambodian police operations were conducted against scam compounds across the country. Further raids took place in Sihanoukville in 2024, resulting in the arrest of 450 individuals involved in online gambling and scam operations. These operations did not succeed in permanently dismantling these networks or ending ongoing allegations of government complicity and tolerance, which have been denounced by numerous NGOs and international institutions. Some local observers have alleged that certain raids were short-lived and sometimes focused on selected compounds or lower-level personnel, with operations resuming or shifting after police departed; allegations also included advance warning in some cases.

In June 2025, a report by Amnesty International brought renewed global media attention on Cambodian scam compounds. Following renewed international attention in mid-2025, Cambodian authorities significantly expanded enforcement actions against online scam operations. Beginning in July 2025, the government publicly began reporting nationwide raids targeting scam compounds, increased disclosure of arrest figures, and regular media briefings on enforcement outcomes. In July 2025, the Prime Minister announced a "task force" dedicated to combating online scam centers. According to policy analysis by Bower Group Asia, expanded enforcement actions between late 2024 and October 2025 resulted in the arrest or detention of more than 5,000 individuals and the shutdown of at least 93 suspected scam sites. Government reporting and news coverage corroborated significant increases in arrests; for example, state sources recorded nearly 3,455 suspects detained in raids on 92 compounds across 18 cities and provinces from June to mid‑October 2025. Cambodian officials described the crackdown on online scam networks as a transparent, coordinated campaign, highlighting nationwide raids, public reporting of arrests, and cooperation with foreign governments, including a joint task force agreement with South Korea and support pledged by Japan.

A major development in the intensified enforcement measures occurred in early January 2026 with the arrest and extradition of Chen Zhi, the founder and chairman of Prince Holding Group, a conglomerate accused by U.S., U.K., and other international authorities of operating one of Asia's largest transnational online scam and fraud networks. Cambodian authorities arrested Chen along with two other Chinese nationals and extradited them to mainland China after revoking his Cambodian citizenship. In coordination with Chen's extradition, Cambodia's central bank ordered the liquidation of Prince Bank, a lender founded by Chen's group and part of its financial services network, suspending its operations and appointing a liquidator to manage asset disposition and creditor claims.

=== Timeline of recent events ===
Year	Major developments
2023	April: Cambodian authorities deported 19 Japanese nationals who had been detained on suspicion of involvement in phone and online scam operations.; May: Southeast Asian leaders at the ASEAN summit pledged a regional crackdown on online scams and the human trafficking that supplies labour to scam operations, amid reports of jobseekers lured by offers in countries including Cambodia.; June: Interpol issued a global warning on "human trafficking-fueled fraud", describing the use of trafficking victims in large-scale online scam operations based largely in Southeast Asia.; August: A United Nations Office on Drugs and Crime (UNODC) policy brief on cyber fraud and trafficking for forced criminality described scam-compound operations in Southeast Asia, including extensive criminal operations in Cambodia using casino and special-economic-zone infrastructure and trafficked labour.; August: The UN Office of the High Commissioner for Human Rights (OHCHR) released a report on cyber scams and related trafficking/forced labor in Southeast Asia, estimating that about 100,000 people in Cambodia were held in scam operations.; November: Cambodia deported 25 Japanese nationals suspected of operating online scams after arrests in Phnom Penh.; December: Interpol reported on Operation Storm Makers II (carried out 16–20 October), in which participating countries conducted inspections at trafficking and migrant-smuggling hotspots linked to movements of victims to cyber scam centres; Interpol said the operation resulted in arrests, rescues, and new investigations.
2024	March: Cambodian authorities conducted raids in Sihanoukville, arresting more than 450 people allegedly linked to illegal online gambling and pig butchering scam operations.; March: India said it had rescued and repatriated about 250 citizens from Cambodia who had been lured by job offers and forced to participate in cyber fraud schemes.; April: Cambodia deported 130 Chinese nationals suspected of fraud-related activities and illegal online gambling, following raids in Sihanoukville.; June: The U.S. State Department's 2024 Trafficking in Persons report said corruption and official complicity in trafficking remained widespread, including exploitation of victims in forced criminality in online scam operations in Cambodia (and Cambodia remained Tier 3).; September: The U.S. Treasury's Office of Foreign Assets Control (OFAC) sanctioned Cambodian senator and tycoon Ly Yong Phat for facilitating cyber scam operations and human trafficking.; October: Cambodian authorities arrested investigative journalist Mech Dara, known for reporting on trafficking and online scam compounds.; Cambodian police raided a housing complex in Kampong Speu province and detained around 1,000 foreign nationals, mainly Chinese and Koreans, amid allegations it was linked to cyber-scam operations.; November: China repatriated 240 arrested Chinese gambling and fraud suspects from Cambodia as part of a joint anti-fraud campaign (following an earlier 2024 repatriation from Cambodia of more than 680 suspects, according to Chinese state media).
2025	February: Thai and Cambodian police raided a building in Poipet and said they freed 215 foreign nationals from a scam centre.; March: Thailand said it was studying construction of a wall along parts of its border with Cambodia amid a widening crackdown on scam centres, after Thai authorities received nationals rescued from a Poipet compound.; April: A UNODC report warned that scam-centre operations were spreading and shifting to more remote and border areas to evade enforcement; a Cambodian government spokesperson said an ad hoc commission chaired by Prime Minister Hun Manet had been established to address online scams.; May: The U.S. Treasury's Financial Crimes Enforcement Network (FinCEN) identified Cambodia-based Huione Group as a "primary money laundering concern" and proposed a rule to bar it from the U.S. financial system, citing alleged links to laundering proceeds from cyber heists and online scams.; Japan said some Japanese nationals had been detained in Cambodia as the two countries cooperated to crack down on fraud centres; Reuters cited Kyodo as reporting that about 30 suspected Japanese nationals were taken to Phnom Penh after detention in Poipet.; June: Amnesty International published an 18-month investigation alleging widespread abuses in more than 50 scamming compounds and "pointing towards state complicity" (allegations the Cambodian government denied).; Reuters reported that Amnesty International identified 53 scam centres and additional suspected sites in Cambodia; a government spokesperson rejected the allegation of inaction and pointed to a task force led by Prime Minister Hun Manet formed earlier in 2025.; July: Following an order by Prime Minister Hun Manet, Cambodian authorities reported arresting more than 1,000 suspects in raids across multiple provinces, including in Poipet and Sihanoukville.; AP reported the crackdown occurred amid heightened tensions with Thailand, including Thai measures such as closing crossing points and cutting cross-border electricity supplies, framed by Thailand as part of efforts to combat border-area cyberscam operations.; AP reported that Cambodia's continued raids since 27 June brought total arrests to more than 2,100, with officials saying the crackdown on scam centres would continue.; September: The United States imposed sanctions on cyber scam operators in Myanmar and Cambodia; Reuters reported that 10 Cambodian entities linked to Chinese criminal networks were sanctioned and that Cambodia-based centers were focused on digital currency fraud.; October: The U.S. and U.K. announced coordinated actions against a Cambodia-linked scam network and money-laundering facilitators, including U.S. Treasury designations and a FinCEN final rule severing Huione Group from the U.S. financial system.; The U.S. Justice Department announced an indictment of Chen Zhi, described as chairman of the Prince Group, and a large bitcoin forfeiture action tied to alleged "pig butchering" scams and forced-labour compounds in Cambodia.; South Korea issued a "code-black" travel ban for parts of Cambodia (including Poipet and Kampot) and sent officials to assist nationals trapped in scam centres, after the reported death of a South Korean student linked to an employment-scam case.; Reuters reported that 64 South Koreans detained in Cambodia in connection with alleged online scam operations returned to South Korea, where most were expected to face investigation.; November: Cambodia and South Korea agreed to strengthen cooperation against online scams; Reuters reported that their national police chiefs launched a joint task force focused on South Korean nationals involved in scam operations based in Cambodia.

== Figures and statistics ==
- Total revenue. According to the United States Institute of Peace and consulting firm Humanity Research Consulting, the Cambodian scam compound industry generates between $12.5 and $19 billion annually, which equates to more than half of Cambodia's gross domestic product.
- Regional scale. In Cambodia, Myanmar and Laos combined, the cybercriminal labor force has been estimated to exceed 350,000 people; conservative estimates place annual revenue generated by scam syndicates in the region at $50 to $75 billion.
- Number of forced workers. According to the UN and the U.S. Agency for International Development (USAID), between 100,000 and 150,000 people are exploited in scam compounds in Cambodia. Most of them are from China and other Southeast Asian countries. African nationals and children are also among the victims of these trafficking and recruitment networks.
- Number of compounds. In a report published in June 2025, Amnesty International stated that it had identified at least 53 active scam compounds across 13 different areas in Cambodia. The special economic zone of Sihanoukville is home to many of these centers, located in hotels, casinos, office buildings, and residential neighborhoods. Similar compounds exist in the capital Phnom Penh and in other special economic zones like Pailin, Anlong Veng, O Smach, Kandal, Pursat, Bavet, and Kampot.
- Number of scam victims. Estimating the total number of victims is difficult, as many do not report their cases to authorities out of shame, fear of retaliation, or lack of legal recourse. Most scam victims are Chinese nationals, but U.S. citizens and individuals from other countries have also been affected. A report from the Global Anti-Scam Organization indicated that at over 1,838 people of from 46 nationalities have lost an average of $169,000 each through so-called pig butchering scams, many of which are operated from Cambodian scam-centers.

== Operating methods ==
=== Pig butchering and romance fraud ===
Cambodian scam compounds heavily rely on the pig butchering scam, a romance fraud where the scammer poses as a romantic partner and builds an online relationship with the victim over several weeks or months. They use stolen photos from Chinese social media and create fake profiles on platforms like LinkedIn, OkCupid, Tinder, Instagram, or WhatsApp. Once trust is established, the victim is persuaded to invest in a fraudulent financial scheme, often involving cryptocurrency or fake trading platforms.

Victims may be approached through dating applications, social media or professional networking platforms, as well as unsolicited "wrong number" text messages, with scammers attempting to build trust before introducing a cryptocurrency "investment" opportunity. Victims can then be directed to fraudulent investment platforms and coached into sending funds; reported tactics include displaying fabricated profits and demanding additional "fees" or "taxes" when victims try to withdraw larger sums.

=== Other scam types and support functions ===
Reported scam activity has also included fraudulent e-commerce sites and other payment-for-goods schemes in which victims pay for items that are never delivered, along with intimidation-based schemes using fabricated “police notification” documents. Accounts have described workers being tasked with activities such as researching and targeting potential victims (including locating personal details like family members’ names, employment and social-media accounts) and producing supporting materials (including fake documents) intended to increase pressure or credibility in communications with targets.

Reported scam activity linked to Cambodia-based compounds has included multiple fraud “scripts” beyond romance-investment schemes, including job-recruitment fraud, “asset recovery” scams, law-enforcement impersonation, extortion schemes such as “virtual kidnapping”, sextortion, and business-email compromise. Some operations have also been reported to experiment with generative-AI tools—including deepfake media and automated translation—to increase scale and make approaches more convincing.

== Victim experience and trafficking ==
Scam-centre operations in Cambodia have been associated with human trafficking for forced labour and forced criminality, in which people are recruited for ostensibly legitimate employment and then compelled to conduct online fraud. Regional reporting has described the phenomenon as “human trafficking-fueled fraud”, in which trafficking victims are coerced into large-scale online scam operations based largely in Southeast Asia. A UN human-rights report on cyber scams and trafficking in Southeast Asia estimated that about 100,000 people in Cambodia were held in scam operations, and described victims being forced to carry out online scams under threats and other abuses, including torture and sexual violence. Some operations have been organised as multi-layered networks in which Chinese-led syndicates coordinate recruiters, managers and other accomplices of various nationalities. An 18-month investigation published by Amnesty International in 2025, based on interviews with survivors of scam-compound trafficking, described systematic trafficking into forced criminality and forced labour, including deception in recruitment, movement through irregular border crossings, confiscation of phones and documents, and coercion maintained through threats, deprivation of liberty and physical abuse.

=== Recruitment promises and coercion ===
Recruitment has been linked to online job advertisements and social-media approaches offering well-paid work, including purported office jobs at fake e-commerce or tech companies. Recruiters have posed as job intermediaries on social platforms and posted fraudulent offers advertising “simple” work with high salaries, including customer-service and information-technology roles (such as computer programming), and have targeted educated jobseekers with relevant skills. Advertisements and approaches have been reported on platforms including Facebook, Telegram, and WeChat. The visibility of Cambodia's casino and online-gambling sector has been cited as making fraudulent recruitment pitches more believable—particularly “gaming”, customer-support, or language-based roles ostensibly serving foreign clients. Victims have described travelling to Cambodia for employment and then being taken to secured compounds, including in casino-linked and special economic zone environments. Upon arrival, victims have been reported as having identity documents confiscated and being forcibly relocated and detained in scam compounds against their will.

Interviews with survivors described recruitment through deceptive job advertisements and brokers offering high salaries and benefits for roles such as translation, customer support, and other “office” work, with transport into Cambodia arranged by recruiters or intermediaries, including via unofficial entry points and smuggling routes. Many survivors said they entered Cambodia through unofficial crossings rather than formal border checkpoints, and described heightened vulnerability once phones were confiscated and they feared arrest for irregular entry. Child victims were also documented among those trafficked into scam compounds, including minors as young as 14.

=== Confinement, violence and "torture rooms" ===
Reported control methods have included restriction of movement, confiscation of passports and phones, constant monitoring by security staff, threats of violence, and the imposition of arbitrary fines and artificial debts (a form of debt bondage). Reported abuses have also included starvation and sexual abuse; some women were coerced into sex work or made to appear as "models" in video chats used to lure scam victims. Reported punishments for attempting to escape or for failing to meet work "quotas" have included beatings and other physical abuse, electrocution and electric shocks, and prolonged confinement.

Survivor testimony described torture and other ill-treatment as a method of control and discipline inside compounds, including punishments linked to scam "targets" or work performance, alleged rule-breaking, and attempts to seek outside help (including contacting police or embassies). Violence was also described as being used to compel faster work and compliance, including to pressure people to pay large "compensation" amounts for release and to force victims to learn skills required for scam work (such as fast typing).

Reported physical abuse included prolonged beatings (sometimes by multiple guards or managers at once), being struck with objects such as sticks, plastic pipes and metal rods, and the use of direct-contact electric shock weapons (including stun batons) to administer repeated electric shocks. Some survivors described visible injuries they said resulted from beatings and electric shocks.

Survivors also described forced exercise and stress positions as punishment (including extended squatting, push-ups, running in place, and other physically exhausting drills), as well as restraint during abuse, including handcuffs and other restraints; accounts included being tied to beds or restrained while being beaten or shocked.

Psychological abuse reported by survivors included humiliation and threats of further violence (including threats of death or severe injury), threats of being turned over to police, and threats of being sold or transferred to other compounds. Some accounts described punishments being inflicted publicly, or being filmed and shown to others, as a means of intimidation and control inside the compound.

Survivor accounts and human-rights reporting have described the use of small, dark, enclosed rooms used for punitive confinement and abuse, sometimes referred to as "torture rooms". Accounts described punitive confinement in dark rooms (including windowless rooms or cage-like spaces), sometimes for hours or days, combined with beatings, electric shocks, deprivation of food, and threats of escalation. Some survivors described being handcuffed and left in cold, air-conditioned rooms (including after water was thrown on them), as well as being hooded or having bags placed over their head during beatings and shocks; accounts also included beatings to the soles of the feet using hard objects.

In September 2024, the U.S. Treasury sanctioned Cambodian senator and tycoon Ly Yong Phat and associated businesses for facilitating cyber scams and human trafficking, and described scam-centre operations linked to an O Smach resort complex in which victims' passports and phones were confiscated and victims were forced to conduct online scams and subjected to physical abuse.

=== Ransom, debts and sale or transfer of victims ===
Victims and their families have reported being pressured to pay money for release, including demands described as “ransom” payments, and being told they owed a debt to the compound that had to be worked off. Travel costs have also been covered and treated as a “debt” to be repaid through scam work, and victims have described being sold to scam entities after arriving in Cambodia. Investigative reporting has also described victims being “sold” or transferred between compounds, including after attempting to escape, with prices negotiated between groups operating different sites.

Survivor accounts described coercive “debts” and fines used to prolong captivity and compel compliance, including arbitrary penalties (for example, for toilet breaks, talking, or alleged underperformance) and debts that could rapidly increase over time; some said they were told they could leave only by paying large “compensation” amounts. Survivors also described sale or transfer between compounds as a control mechanism; the report stated that 23 of 58 survivors reported being sold into a compound, witnessing such sales, or being threatened with sale to another compound or across borders.

=== Victim–offender overlap ===
Scam-compound trafficking cases can involve blurred boundaries between victimisation and offending, including situations in which victims are coerced into facilitating operations or recruiting others, complicating victim identification and criminal investigations.

=== Deaths and escape attempts ===
Reporting on Cambodian scam compounds has included accounts of people attempting to escape by jumping from upper floors, sometimes resulting in serious injuries. Human-rights reporting has also documented cases in which people died inside compounds, including a confirmed case involving a child, as well as deaths reported by witnesses and survivors. Survivor accounts also described escape attempts and the risks faced by those trying to flee, including people jumping from buildings and groups attempting to break out (including through setting fires), alongside accounts of severe reprisals against those caught.

=== Escape, rescue and repatriation challenges ===
Security measures and threats of violence have made escape difficult, and rescues have often relied on law-enforcement raids and consular intervention. Survivors have also described difficulties accessing protection and services after leaving compounds, including limited shelter capacity and inconsistent responses from assistance organisations. Trafficking specialists have argued that advocacy on human trafficking—including scam-compound cases—can attract retaliation or regulatory pressure, which may discourage some local groups from taking on such cases. Victim-identification problems have also been reported, including cases in which people removed from compounds were treated as immigration offenders rather than trafficking victims, limiting access to protection and assistance.

In March 2024, India said it had rescued and repatriated about 250 citizens from Cambodia who had been lured by job offers and forced to participate in cyber fraud schemes. In February 2025, Thai and Cambodian police raided a building in Poipet and said they freed 215 foreign nationals from a scam centre, including nationals from Thailand, Pakistan, India, Taiwan, and Indonesia. In March 2025, Thailand said it was studying construction of a wall along parts of its border with Cambodia after Thai authorities received nationals rescued from a Poipet compound.

=== Documented abuses and official response ===
A 2025 Amnesty International investigation described patterns of forced labour, deprivation of liberty, torture and other ill-treatment, and other abuses in Cambodian scam compounds, and linked these patterns to trafficking into forced criminality. The Cambodian government denied allegations of inaction and said it was addressing online scams through enforcement efforts.

Some observers have highlighted institutional gaps in addressing trafficking-linked “forced scamming”, arguing that cybercrime and human trafficking are often handled as separate problems and that responsibilities are fragmented rather than clearly assigned to a single lead body. Critics have also questioned the effectiveness of the government's National Committee for Counter Trafficking (NCCT), describing some public-facing activities as oriented toward reputational messaging and rebutting allegations rather than sustained accountability for well-connected operators.

== Locations and hubs ==
Selected locations frequently mentioned in reporting, official actions, and Amnesty International’s 2025 table of scamming compounds

Scam centres in Cambodia have been documented across multiple towns and cities, including large enclosed compounds used to detain trafficking victims and run online fraud operations. An 18-month investigation published by Amnesty International in 2025 identified at least 53 active scam centres (and additional suspected sites) and described many compounds as operating in repurposed casinos and hotels; related public materials mapped sites across multiple towns and cities nationwide. The report also included a table listing the documented active compounds with coordinates and summary notes on documented abuses and the extent of state intervention or investigation.

Locations have frequently overlapped with casino-linked developments and special economic zone environments. UNODC has linked scam-centre activity in Southeast Asia to casino and SEZ infrastructure and to trafficking for forced criminality, while enforcement pressure has been associated with displacement into more remote areas and border hubs, including sites along the borders with Thailand and Vietnam and in provinces such as Koh Kong.

CyberScamMonitor has also published profiles of suspected scam-centre sites, compiling open-source reporting and related public materials on specific facilities and compounds (including casino-linked developments); much of the location-level information below draws on that research and the underlying reporting it links to.

=== Locations ===
The locations below are frequently mentioned in major coverage and official summaries and in documentation of scamming compounds; the list is not exhaustive.

Banteay Meanchey

- Ou Chrov (Ou Chrov District) – A casino complex in O Bei Choan has been linked to online scam operations and trafficking allegations.
- Poipet – Thai and Cambodian police said they freed 215 foreign nationals from a scam centre during a raid in 2025. Five compounds in Poipet have been linked to deprivation of liberty (including children) and, in some cases, human trafficking and forced labour.

Kampong Speu

- Chbar Mon – Cambodian police raided a housing complex in Kampong Speu province and detained around 1,000 foreign nationals amid allegations the site was linked to cyber-scam operations.

Kampot

- Kampot (including Bokor and Kampong Trach) – Scam-compound allegations have included cases linked to facilities near the Vietnam border in Kampong Trach district, including the WO Casino complex in Kampot province. Two compounds in Kampot province have been linked to deprivation of liberty; one was reported as abandoned by December 2023, while another appeared to still be operating in late 2024.

Koh Kong

- Botum Sakor – Two compounds in the Botum Sakor area have been linked to deprivation of liberty; documented interventions occurred between 2022 and 2024, with abuses reported into 2025.
- Koh Kong – Border and coastal sites in Koh Kong province have been repeatedly referenced in discussion of scam-centre displacement and trafficking-linked operations. A compound in Koh Kong has been associated with human trafficking, forced labour and deprivation of liberty, with state intervention reported in early 2023 and abuses documented in mid-2024.

Kratie

- Pir Thnu (Snuol district) – Heng Heng I Casino has been linked in reporting to trafficking and forced-labour allegations connected to online scamming operations at the location.

Mondulkiri

- Dak Dam (Ou Reang District) – A compound in Dak Dam has been linked to cyber-scam and online-gambling operations. In July 2025, authorities raided a site in Pouchab Village, Dak Dam, and detained 149 foreign nationals.
- Sen Monorom – In March 2025, authorities raided an illegal online operation in Sen Monorom and detained 258 foreign nationals; officials said 14 detainees were transferred for investigation on suspicion of violence and forced labour, while the remainder were handed over for immigration processing.
- Srae Khtum (Keo Seima District) – In December 2025, police detained 30 South Korean nationals during a raid at a casino/hotel complex near the Cambodia–Vietnam border.

Oddar Meanchey

- Chob Kokir Khang Lich – A compound in Chob Kokir Khang Lich has been linked to deprivation of liberty (including children), with abuses documented between January and June 2025.
- Ou Smach – U.S. sanctions action in 2024 designated O‑Smach Resort in connection with serious abuses linked to forced labour in online scam-centre operations, and described repeated rescue missions at the site. Two compounds in O’Smach have been linked to deprivation of liberty; one site has also been associated with human trafficking, forced labour, torture and other ill-treatment and enslavement, alongside repeated interventions between 2022 and 2024.

Pailin

- Psar Prum – A compound in Psar Prum has been associated with human trafficking, forced labour, torture and other ill-treatment and deprivation of liberty; no public information has indicated a state investigation or intervention.

Phnom Penh and Kandal

- Chrey Thum – Four compounds in Chrey Thum have been linked to deprivation of liberty and, in some cases, human trafficking, forced labour, child labour, torture and other ill-treatment and enslavement; interventions were documented between 2021 and 2024, with abuses reported into 2025.
- Phnom Penh and nearby sites in Kandal – The 2024 U.S. action also designated Cambodia-based Garden City Hotel and Phnom Penh Hotel in connection with the sanctioned network, while later Cambodian enforcement operations reported large-scale detentions in Kandal province. Four compounds in Phnom Penh and surrounding areas have been linked to deprivation of liberty and, in some cases, human trafficking, forced labour, torture and other ill-treatment and enslavement; interventions were documented at some sites in 2022 and 2024, alongside sites for which no public intervention was reported.

Preah Sihanouk

- Sihanoukville – Raids and deportations linked to online scam and illegal gambling investigations have repeatedly been reported in the Sihanoukville area. At least 22 compounds in and around Sihanoukville have been linked to deprivation of liberty and, in a number of cases, human trafficking, forced labour, torture and other ill-treatment and enslavement; one site was reported as abandoned by the end of 2024.

Preah Vihear

- Choam – A compound in Choam has been linked to human trafficking, forced labour, torture and other ill-treatment and deprivation of liberty, with abuses documented in 2024.

Prey Veng

- Banteay Chakrei (Preah Sdach District) – Monaco Casino Hotel at the Cambodia–Vietnam border has been linked to online scamming and trafficking allegations.
- Krabau (Kamchay Mear District) – “Meun Chey Commercial City” (also described as “#8 Park” / “Legend Park”) has been described as a large, still-under-construction casino/hotel complex near the Cambodia–Vietnam border checkpoint on National Road 8, alongside public material alleging cyber-scam/online-gambling links connected to the site.

Pursat

- Thma Da – Reporting during the 2025 Cambodia–Thailand fighting described Thai shelling striking sites described as scam-compound locations, including the Thma Da area and a special economic zone widely alleged to host scam-compound activity. A compound in Thma Da has been linked to human trafficking, forced labour and deprivation of liberty, with interventions documented in late 2021, 2023 and 2024 and abuses reported in 2025.

Stung Treng

- Stung Treng – Cambodian enforcement operations in 2025 included detentions reported in Stung Treng province, among other locations.

Svay Rieng

- Bavet – UNODC has highlighted casino-linked development at the Cambodia–Vietnam border (including the Bavet–Mộc Bài casino zone) as part of the wider regional scam-compound ecosystem. Six compounds in Bavet have been linked to deprivation of liberty (including children) and, in some cases, human trafficking, forced labour, torture and other ill-treatment and enslavement.
- Bos Mon (Rumduol District) – Bosman Casino Hotel in Bos Mon is located just over 100 metres from an international border checkpoint and has been linked to online scamming and trafficking allegations.

Takeo

- Takeo – A compound in Takeo has been linked to deprivation of liberty, including children; authorities intervened in late 2024, with abuses documented in 2025.

Tboung Khmum

- Anlong Chrey (Kandaol Chrum commune, Ponhea Kraek District) – Allegations of online scamming and trafficking have been associated with fenced and guarded compounds around Anlong Chrey near the Cambodia–Vietnam border, including references in Telegram posts; Cambodia's casino licensing listings in 2023–2024 have been cited as showing the same operator name associated with adjacent developments.
- Trapeang Phlong (Ponhea Kraek District) – Sites along National Road 72 near the Cambodia–Vietnam border have been associated with online scam operations and trafficking allegations. Reported cross-border interventions have included a November 2024 fire at a casino building in Trapeang Phlong commune that required assistance from Vietnamese firefighters and injured two Vietnamese women, a July 2025 raid on an online scam centre in which 448 people were detained (including 350 Vietnamese nationals), and an August 2025 handover of 353 Vietnamese citizens at the Xa Mat International Border Gate after they said they had travelled to work in casinos opposite the border gate in Tboung Khmum province. Vietnamese reporting cited in the same body of material includes cases in which citizens were received back from Cambodia after being held in scam-centre environments.

== Financial flows and laundering ==
Scam centres in Cambodia have been described as scaling through a wider criminal service economy that connects fraud operations to cross-border payment collection, underground banking and money laundering. A 2025 policy analysis described Cambodia's gambling sector as a large-scale channel for laundering illicit proceeds into the country's formal financial system, and cited factors such as a dollarized economy and Cambodia's removal from the Financial Action Task Force (FATF) grey list in 2022 as facilitating cross-border financial flows. UNODC has linked scam-centre operations in Cambodia and elsewhere in Southeast Asia to casino-linked and special economic zone environments, human trafficking for forced criminality, and the laundering of proceeds into the formal economy. UNODC has also warned that crackdowns can displace operations into more remote and border areas within Cambodia, including Koh Kong and areas bordering Thailand and Vietnam.

=== Collection, conversion and laundering pathways ===
Many Cambodia-linked scam operations use “investment” or “romance-investment” fraud models (including pig butchering scams) to induce targets to transfer funds via wire transfers or in cryptocurrency—often stablecoins—to accounts or wallet addresses controlled by the network. U.S. Treasury sanctions actions against Cambodia-linked actors described “confidence” scams in which victims were induced to invest in virtual currency or over-the-counter foreign exchange. FinCEN has described similar typologies in which victims purchase and transfer virtual currency to fraudulent investment platforms and scam-controlled addresses.

Once collected, proceeds can be routed through multiple bank accounts and crypto wallets to obscure origin and enable cross-border movement and conversion. Documented methods include using intermediaries such as virtual asset service providers and informal or unlicensed money-transmission services associated with scam-centre ecosystems.

=== Online marketplaces and enforcement actions ===
Cambodia-linked online marketplaces have been described as providing both “fraud infrastructure” (such as stolen data and scam tooling) and laundering services for scam networks. In July 2024, blockchain-analytics firm Elliptic reported that the Telegram-based “Huione Guarantee” marketplace offered money-laundering services, including cross-border fund movement and conversion to cash, stablecoins and Chinese payment apps. The same reporting described payments as being accepted primarily in the USDT stablecoin, and described the platform as providing escrow-like “guarantee” services between buyers and sellers. In May 2025, Telegram blocked “Huione Guarantee” and “Xinbi Guarantee” channels after reporting linked them to cryptocurrency scams and money laundering.

In May 2025, FinCEN identified Cambodia-based Huione Group as a financial institution of “primary money laundering concern” and described a network of affiliated businesses providing payment services (Huione Pay), virtual-asset services (Huione Crypto) and an online marketplace (Haowang Guarantee, previously Huione Guarantee) used by cyber-scam networks. FinCEN said Huione Group laundered at least US$4 billion in illicit proceeds between August 2021 and January 2025. In October 2025, the United States and the United Kingdom announced coordinated actions targeting Cambodia-linked cyber-scam networks and money-laundering facilitators. The U.S. Treasury described the “Prince Group” network as laundering illicit revenues through offshore shell companies and using methods including large wire transfers and bulk cash smuggling. FinCEN issued a final rule intended to sever Huione Group from the U.S. financial system, effective 17 November 2025.

=== Citizenship-by-investment and mobility ===
Cambodia has provisions under which foreign nationals can obtain Cambodian citizenship through investment or other contributions. Government publication of naturalisation recipients between 2009 and 2023 provided some public visibility into new citizenship grants, but later access to this naturalisation information was reduced, limiting transparency about recipients.

Cambodian passports have also been cited in transnational financial-crime cases; in a major Singapore money-laundering case in 2023, most of the convicted defendants were reported to hold Cambodian passports, and multiple individuals were deported to Cambodia after sentencing.

== Allegations of government complicity ==
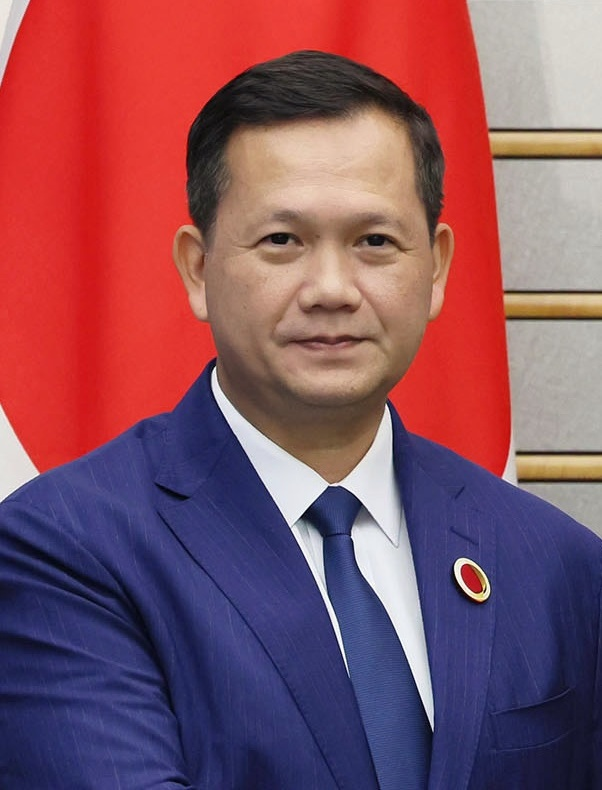
Prime Minister Hun Manet in 2023

In assessing barriers to disruption of scam-compound networks, a Humanity Research Consultancy report argued that multiple interviewees perceived state involvement as extending beyond passive tolerance, and described the justice sector as constrained by elite incentives that make sustained accountability for senior figures difficult in practice. Scam-centre operations in Cambodia are illegal, but multiple investigations and institutional assessments have described compounds operating in plain sight in casinos, hotels and large commercial developments, alongside persistent allegations that corruption and political patronage have enabled the industry to function with relative impunity. These accounts have described influential business figures as central to scam-compound ecosystems, and as difficult to target in practice in a broader environment of patronage and weak enforcement. Cambodian officials have rejected claims of state complicity and have pointed to raids, arrests and other enforcement measures as evidence of action against scam operations.

=== Corruption, protection and impunity in institutional assessments ===
Cyber-fraud and trafficking-for-forced-criminality ecosystems in Southeast Asia have been described as benefiting from corruption and complicity by some public officials, and from alliances with politically connected and private-sector elites that can help normalize and expand illegal operations. Scam operations have also been described as embedding within legitimate-looking developments (including casino-linked environments), and enforcement pressure alone has been associated with displacement of activity without removing the enabling conditions that allow it to reconstitute elsewhere.

A June 2025 Amnesty International investigation argued that the persistence and scale of abuses in scam compounds—including torture and other ill-treatment—alongside the continued operation of numerous sites, indicated more than isolated criminality and “pointed towards state complicity”; the Cambodian government disputed the allegation.

International human rights reporting framed the issue in terms of state responsibility and due diligence under international human rights law, including duties to prevent, investigate and prosecute serious abuses such as human trafficking, forced labour, unlawful detention and torture committed by private actors, and to provide effective remedies. It argued that authorities were aware of risks of serious abuse through years of complaints and requests for help, while many identified compounds showed no public record of investigation or continued operating after interventions.

Critics have also argued that interventions often focus on extracting individuals who request assistance and that people removed from compounds are frequently processed as immigration offenders, limiting access to protection; survivors described officials entering compounds and leaving after speaking with management, followed by reprisals against those who had sought help.

=== Allegations involving law enforcement and the Ministry of Interior ===
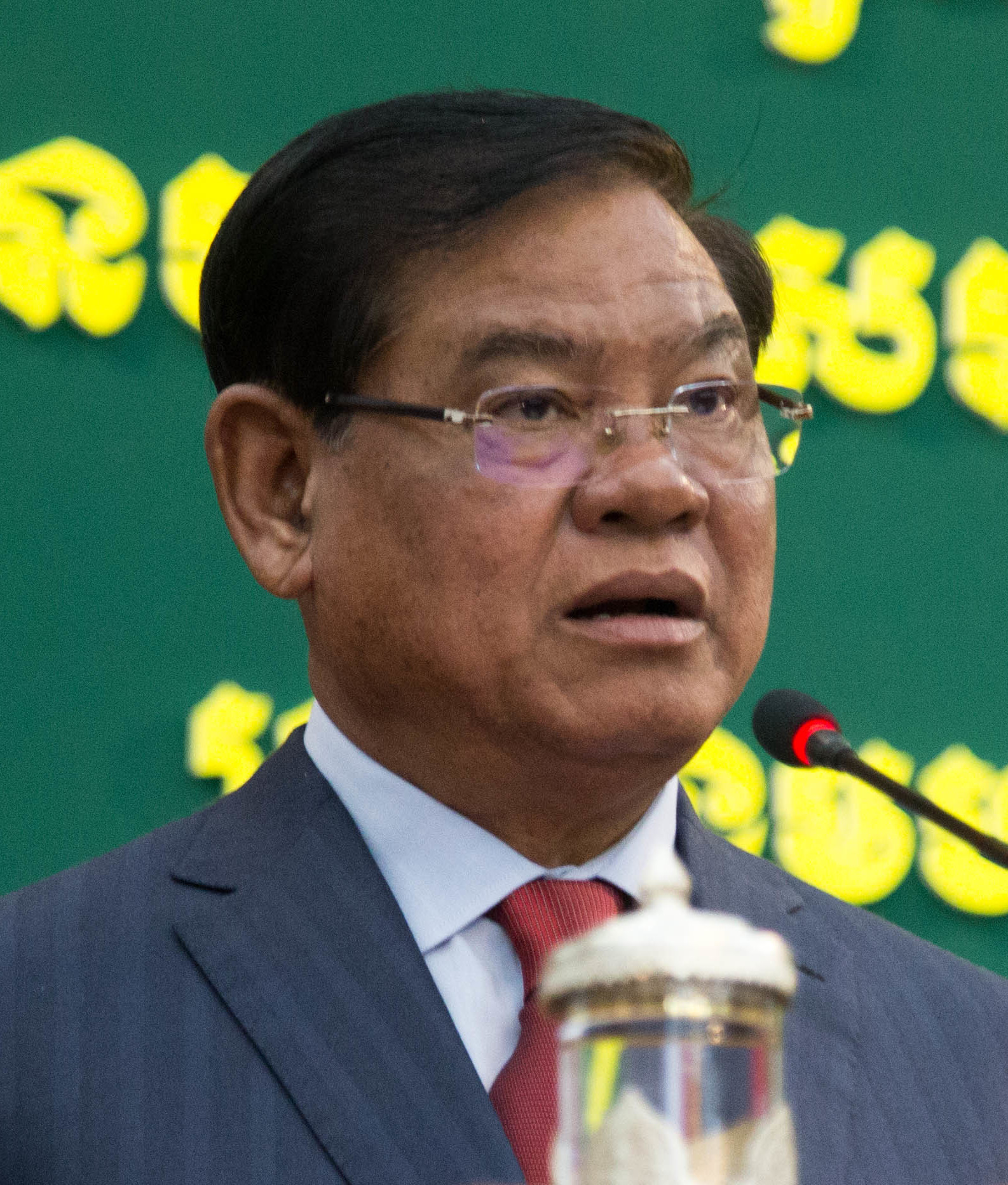
Former interior minister Sar Kheng in 2016

A three-part investigation by Radio Free Asia reported that previously unreported Chinese criminal court judgments from 2020 to 2022 described Chen Zhi's Prince Group as a “notorious transnational online gambling criminal group”; a Prince Group representative told RFA the company denies the allegations and said explicit references to the company in the judgments reflected “impersonation by criminal elements”.

The same investigation described how politically connected business figures linked to casino and property developments overlap with allegations about scam-compound activity, and how those links intersect with the institutions responsible for public security. It reported that a 2017 royal decree named Chen Zhi (founder of the Prince Group) as an adviser to the Ministry of Interior with a rank described as equivalent to an undersecretary of state, and described Chen as holding adviser titles to senior political figures including Hun Sen and Hun Manet. It also reported that Chen and Sar Sokha—who became interior minister in 2023—entered a joint venture in 2017, citing Cambodian corporate records; the company was later dissolved.

In its third part, RFA reported allegations of trafficking-linked online-scam activity and violence at a walled compound in Chrey Thum (a border area in Kandal), described as the Golden Fortune Science and Technology Park. Witnesses and former workers described beatings and the use of electric shocks against workers, and alleged that private security guarded exits and controlled movement. Local residents also alleged that local police worked at the site as security guards, while a local police chief said he was unaware of the compound's operation; RFA reported that a senior official at the interior ministry said he was not aware of the compound's existence and would check, and the Prince Group rejected wrongdoing and disputed that it owned or operated the compound.

=== Sanctions and official actions referencing scam-centre abuses ===
In September 2024, the U.S. Department of the Treasury's Office of Foreign Assets Control (OFAC) imposed sanctions on Cambodian businessman and senator Ly Yong Phat, his conglomerate L.Y.P. Group, and O‑Smach Resort over what the U.S. government described as serious human-rights abuses linked to trafficking victims subjected to forced labour in online scam operations. The designation also covered multiple hotels and resorts described as being owned or controlled by Ly Yong Phat, including Garden City Hotel, Koh Kong Resort and Phnom Penh Hotel, and cited U.S. government assessments describing corruption and official complicity as obstacles to effective law enforcement in trafficking cases linked to scam operations.

In October 2025, the United States and the United Kingdom announced coordinated actions against a Cambodia-linked cyber-scam network associated with Chen Zhi and the Prince Group. The U.S. government announced sanctions against Chen and related entities, and the United States Department of Justice announced an indictment alleging that Chen led scam-compound operations involving human trafficking and forced labour, with additional allegations including coercion and torture of workers; the Prince Group has denied wrongdoing. U.S. prosecutors also alleged that the network relied on bribery and political influence to reduce the risk of law-enforcement disruption to the operations.

=== Politically connected business networks cited in reporting ===
Investigative reporting has described scam compounds operating in highly visible locations, including within major casino and tourism zones. A 2022 ProPublica investigation into trafficking into cyber-scam operations reported that a large compound in Sihanoukville stood diagonally across from then-prime minister Hun Sen’s summer residence, as part of a broader account of compounds operating openly while victims were trafficked and coerced into scam work.

Separate investigations into scam-economy “service” infrastructure have examined corporate links between Cambodia-based companies used by scammers and politically connected individuals. Blockchain-analytics firm Elliptic reported that the “Huione Guarantee” marketplace was linked to Cambodia-based Huione Group companies used by scammers and said corporate records showed links involving members of the Hun family, including Hun To as a director of Huione Pay; Wired reported on the same marketplace as enabling large-scale scam activity tied to cryptocurrency and support services for fraud operations.

== Reactions ==
=== Media repression ===
Independent reporting on scam compounds has taken place amid broader constraints on Cambodian media. In 2023, the government revoked the licence of the outlet Voice of Democracy (VOD), shutting it down; observers linked the decision to VOD's coverage of trafficking-linked online-scam activity and related corruption allegations. Assessments of organised crime in Cambodia have also described restrictions on journalists’ ability to cover some police investigations, limiting independent scrutiny of enforcement actions and trafficking allegations. Grassroots volunteer networks, human-rights watchdogs and independent media have been described as key sources of publicly available evidence on senior operators, their networks and operating methods, while donor-funded counter-trafficking initiatives have been criticized as constrained by reliance on relationships with compromised officials. Local civil-society groups involved in documenting and assisting victims have also been reported to face escalating legal and physical risks, alongside vulnerability to funding disruptions, including funding reductions in early 2025.

Cambodian journalist Mech Dara, who investigated scam-centre networks and related corruption, was arrested in 2024 and charged with incitement in connection with social-media posts; the case drew condemnation from journalists and press-freedom advocates. After his release on bail, a pro-government outlet aired video of Dara apologising to Cambodia's leaders. Dara later said he would leave journalism and become a farmer, citing pressure and the broader contraction of space for independent reporting in Cambodia. Several other Cambodian journalists who have reported on scam compounds have also described threats, retaliation and intimidation linked to their reporting.

=== International and regional responses ===
Cross-border law-enforcement operations and consular interventions have been a recurring feature of regional responses to scam compounds operating in Cambodia. Thai and Cambodian police have conducted joint actions in border areas, including a 2025 raid in Poipet in which authorities said they freed 215 foreign nationals, while Thailand has also weighed border infrastructure measures framed as part of efforts to disrupt trafficking-linked scam activity. During Cambodia's 2025 crackdown and related tensions with Thailand, Thai measures reported in coverage included restrictions at some crossing points and cuts to cross-border electricity supplies, described by Thai authorities as part of anti-scam efforts. Other governments have reported large-scale repatriations of nationals from Cambodia linked to scam-compound cases, including India's rescue and return of about 250 citizens in 2024 and China–Cambodia actions that included repatriations of Chinese suspects in 2024, alongside other bilateral cooperation and detentions involving foreign nationals. While many reported rescues and repatriations involve Asian nationals, reporting and NGO documentation have also described victims from outside the region, including African nationals, among those trafficked into scam-compound environments in Cambodia.

South Korea has been a prominent source of diplomatic and policing pressure tied to scam-compound cases. In October 2025, South Korea issued a heightened travel restriction for parts of Cambodia (including Poipet and Kampot) and deployed officials to assist nationals trapped in scam centres, and later said dozens of South Koreans detained in Cambodia in connection with alleged online scams had returned to South Korea where most were expected to face investigation. In November 2025, Cambodia and South Korea announced plans for strengthened cooperation against online scams, including a joint police task force discussed by their national police chiefs.

Analyses of China's role in the wider regional scam economy have described mixed incentives, noting that Chinese nationals have been victimised both as scam targets and as trafficked workers, while domestic crackdowns on organised crime and illegal gambling in China have also been linked to the displacement of some operators into neighbouring states, including Cambodia.

Regional coordination has been discussed through ASEAN-linked channels alongside bilateral crackdowns. In 2023, Southeast Asian leaders publicly pledged coordinated action against online scams and the trafficking that supplies forced labour to scam operations, amid reporting on jobseekers lured into work in countries including Cambodia. Policy analysis has framed ASEAN responses as spanning law-enforcement cooperation, judicial coordination, and victim protection, including work associated with mechanisms described as the ASEAN Working Group on Anti-Online Scams and ASEAN policing cooperation, while also emphasising gaps in implementation and cross-border disruption of trafficking and scam finance.

UN bodies and NGOs have emphasised a “prevention, protection, prosecution” approach alongside financial disruption, including measures aimed at preventing recruitment, improving victim identification and assistance, and targeting the proceeds of scam operations. UNODC and other UN-linked reporting has described the integration of scam compounds with trafficking for forced criminality and casino-linked infrastructure, and has warned that enforcement pressure can displace operations geographically rather than eliminate them. UN recommendations and reporting have also highlighted shortcomings in victim screening and the risk that people removed from compounds are treated as immigration offenders rather than trafficking victims in need of protection, while other analysis has described the International Organization for Migration (IOM) as supporting repatriation efforts for victims of forced criminality in Southeast Asia.

International responses have also included sanctions, prosecutions and specialised enforcement initiatives aimed at disrupting scam networks and their finances. In October 2025, the United States and the United Kingdom announced coordinated actions targeting a Cambodia-linked scam network, including sanctions designations, while the U.S. Justice Department announced an indictment of Chen Zhi tied to alleged forced-labour scam compounds and related fraud schemes.

=== United States: Scam Center Strike Force ===
In November 2025, the United States Attorney’s Office for the District of Columbia announced the creation of a “Scam Center Strike Force” focused on Southeast Asia-linked cryptocurrency investment fraud and associated trafficking and money laundering, describing scam-centre operations as combining forced labour with large-scale online fraud targeting victims abroad. The announcement described the strike force as intended to coordinate investigations, pursue prosecutions and forfeiture actions, and strengthen cooperation with foreign partners and private-sector entities involved in payments and communications.

The strike force combines asset-seizure priorities with international coordination, including the deployment of FBI personnel in Bangkok to work with Thai police initiatives described as a “war room” against scam networks, and pursuing seizure and forfeiture actions aimed at disrupting proceeds and operational capacity. It has also sought to target enabling infrastructure used by scam operations, including satellite internet terminals, as part of a broader strategy to constrain compound connectivity and scale.

=== Cambodia: Scambodia ===
The term "Scambodia" has been commonly used to refer to Cambodia in connection with scam-centre activity. The term first appeared in Thai public discourse during the 2025 Cambodian–Thai border crisis. During the conflict, Thai forces shelled sites described in reporting as scam centres in Cambodia.

On 19 April 2026, The Wall Street Journal brought widespread international attention to the country's illicit cyber-scam industry by utilizing the term "Scambodia" in its reporting. In response, on 23 April, the Cambodian government defended its stance by accusing The Wall Street Journal of "violating media ethics" and "attempting to damage the nation's reputation."

== See also ==
- Human trafficking in Cambodia
- Scam centers in Myanmar
