= Sihanouk Hospital Center of HOPE =

Free non-governmental hospital in Phnom Penh, Cambodia

- HOPEworldwide

Geography
- Location: Street 134, Sangkat Veal Vong, Khan 7 Makara, Phnom Penh, Cambodia
- Coordinates: 11°34′4.959″N 104°54′58.061″E

Organisation
- Type: General

Services
- Emergency department: Yes

History
- Founded: 1996

Sihanouk Hospital Center of HOPE (SHCH) was established as a free non-governmental hospital in 1996 by Bernard Krisher, an American philanthropist, in Phnom Penh, Cambodia. The hospital's mission was to help rebuild the country's medical infrastructure by treating patients and training medical personnel and was named in honor of Cambodia's "King Father", Norodom Sihanouk. In 2022, SHCH faced closure by the Cambodian government, alleging unpaid taxes. The Cambodian Journalists Alliance connected the government action to the September 2017 shutdown of The Cambodia Daily which Kirshner had founded.

== History ==
An estimated 2 million people had died in the Cambodian genocide, and in 1979 only 49 doctors remained alive in the country. In 1996, three international organizations, Japan Relief for Cambodia, World Mate, a Shinto organization, and HOPEworldwide, a Christian organization, formed a US non-profit organization, the Sihanouk Hospital Corporation, to govern the hospital. World Mate provided funding for the establishment and operations the hospital. HOPEworldwide managed the hospital and volunteers such as internist Cameron Gifford and nurse Cathy Pingoy initially provided its staffing.

By March 1997, when the country had no inpatient facilities for those with mental illness, the hospital had provided services to 2,000 such patients and had administered 13,000 consultations.

Kenzo Tange, renowned Japanese architect, designed the hospital building pro bono. Construction of a $300,000 annex to the hospital's main building began in January 2002 to expand its community AIDS program, and treatments of diabetes, dermatology, and hypertension. At the time, the hospital had instituted a lottery system as demand for its services outpaced the hospital's ability to provide care.

== Operations ==
In August, 2008, SHCH's emergency room was receiving 400 patients each day and operated as the only free hospital in the country. In 2009, the hospital was serving 3,000 AIDS HIV-positive patients.

Carol A. Rodley, the U.S. ambassador to Cambodia, said in 2009 that, "Not only is this one of the busiest adult hospitals in Cambodia, it is one of the best. The hardworking staff here provides the poor with health care of the highest standard at no charge".

In 2010, Calvin Johnson (anesthesiologist) performed surgeries and taught medical procedures to the staff. In the United States, he has raised over $100,000 through "Hoops for Hope," a basketball fundraiser supporting the hospital.

After 20 years in operation, SHCH had provided training courses to 5,000 healthcare professionals and treated 1.3 million patients. In 2016, its operating budget was $4.5 million dollars. Gary Jacques, the hospital's director from 2003–2007, noted that when he started, most key staff members were expatriates, but now Cambodians had been trained to fill those roles, and the number of women in directorial positions had grown.

In 2017, an SHCH spokesperson told The Phnom Penh Post that over 60% of its patients were from rural areas, with more than two-thirds living on less than $5 per day.

According to its website in November 2022, the hospital's mission was "to provide affordable, quality healthcare to those living in Cambodia in poverty, while training the nation's top clinicians to further serve the Cambodian population." Payment for medical services was based on the patient's ability to pay, using a sliding scale. SHCH had been administering training programs to over 500 health professionals annually, and was recognized by Cambodia's Ministry of Health (MoH) as a training and research institution. With over 200 Cambodians on staff, the hospital's laboratory, nursing, pharmacy, radiology, and surgical departments were the main training sites for Cambodia's university medical students.

In August 2023, the Cambodian minister of woman's affairs announced the "Fit For HOPE 2023" campaign. SHCH is the only hospital in the country to provide free breast cancer diagnosis, screening, education, training, and treatment.
