= Human trafficking in Cambodia =

Cambodia is a source, transit, and destination country for human trafficking. Traffickers are reportedly members of organized crime syndicates, parents, relatives, friends, intimate partners, and neighbors.

Cambodia ratified the 2000 UN TIP Protocol in July 2007. Despite human trafficking being a crime in Cambodia, the country has a significant child sex tourism problem; some children are sold by their parents, while others are lured by what they think are legitimate job offers, such as waitressing, but then are forced into prostitution. Children are often held captive, beaten, and starved to force them into prostitution. Fraud factories have also proliferated in Cambodia during the 2020s.

In 2022, the U.S. Department of State's Trafficking in Persons Report downgraded Cambodia to "Tier 3" due to the Cambodian government's failure to meet the minimum standards to eliminate human trafficking and insufficient effort to address human trafficking. Cambodia had previously hovered between Tier 2 and the Tier 2 watch lists. The country remained at Tier 3 in 2023.

In 2023, the Organised Crime Index gave the country a score of 8.5 out of 10 for human trafficking, noting a sharp increase in numbers after Covid-19.

== Survey ==
A UNICEF survey concluded that 35% of Cambodia's 15,000 prostitutes are children under the age of 16. Almost all of Cambodian brothels are Vietnamese-owned, with most of its prostitutes being of Vietnamese descent and captured sex slaves being of other ethnic groups. Men are trafficked for forced labor in the agriculture, fishing, and construction industries. Women are trafficked for sexual exploitation and forced labor in factories or as domestic servants. Children are trafficked for sexual exploitation and forced labor in organized begging rings, soliciting, and street vending.

Common destinations for trafficking victims are Phnom Penh, Siem Reap, and Sihanoukville.

In March 2025, the Cambodian government stated that cases of human trafficking increased in 2024, with a total of 197 cases—33 more than the previous year. The authorities reported having deported 2,695 Chinese nationals, 1,198 Vietnamese nationals, and 861 Indonesian nationals involved in human trafficking cases.

== Conditions ==
Pimps are reported to imprison young children who are virgins. These children would not be placed to work until they had been presented to a series of bidders, such as high-ranking military officers, politicians, businessmen, and foreign tourists. Young girls working in brothels are in effect, sex slaves; they receive no money, only food, and armed guards stop them from running away. Children are often held captive, beaten, and starved to force them into prostitution.

== Cases ==
=== Forced prostitution ===
Cambodia is both a transit and destination country for women who are victims of trafficking and sexual exploitation in Southeast Asia. Women from rural areas of Cambodia, China, and Vietnam fall prey to trafficking networks and traffickers who transport them to major cities where they are sold or sexually exploited.

A 2016 UNAIDS report estimated the number of sex workers in Cambodia at 34,000.

=== Child sex trafficking ===
Cambodia is one of the main destinations for child prostitution and sex tourism involving minors.

Children as young as 3 are being sold as slaves for sex. By some estimates, hundreds of thousands of children are bought, sold, or kidnapped around the world each year and then forced to have sex. ECPAT Cambodia reports that as many as one third of the trafficking victims in prostitution are children.

In 1995, a 15-year-old child that was trafficked into prostitution in a brothel in the Svay Por district of Battambang was beaten to death.

=== Foreign child molesters ===
The MOI reported the arrest of 31 foreign child molesters in Cambodia in 2009.

=== Scam compounds ===
According to the United Nations and the United States Agency for International Development (USAID), between 100,000 and 150,000 people are believed to be working under forced conditions in scam centres in Cambodia.

Victims are primarily from across Asia. They are lured to Cambodia by criminal networks that post fake job offers on platforms such as Facebook, Telegram, or WeChat. The advertisements promise well-paid office jobs in fictitious online trading or tech companies based in Cambodia.

After arriving, the individuals are often stripped of their identity documents, forcibly relocated, and held against their will in scam compounds. If they don't want to fraud, they are risk to organ harvesting.

On 17 August 2022, 42 Vietnamese victims escaped from the Golden Phoenix casino near the Chrey Thom border checkpoint by swimming across the Binh Di River. Among them, a 16-year-old boy drowned crossing the river. On 17 September 2022, a group of 60 Vietnamese people fled from a casino in Bavet city in Svay Rieng province. Cambodian police later managed to rescue 15 more Vietnamese nationals.

Several non-governmental organizations and eyewitness testimonies have reported cases of human trafficking, forced labour, torture, child exploitation, and other forms of abuse inside these scam centres. In June 2025, the NGO Amnesty International accused the Cambodian government of complicity in the proliferation of these centres.

== Laws ==
A law was passed in January 1997 to curb trafficking in women, with fines of up to $12,000 and prison sentences of up to 20 years for pimps and brothel owners.

In 2008, the Government introduced the Law on Suppression of Human Trafficking and Sexual Exploitation, which criminalizes all forms of trafficking. However, the country remained a source, destination, and transit country for men, women, and children trafficked for sexual exploitation and labor. Children were trafficked domestically for sexual exploitation.

Cambodia is party to several international covenants prohibiting the trafficking of persons and the exploitation of women and children.

Cambodia has continued to assist U.S. law enforcement authorities in the transfer to U.S. custody of Americans who have sexually exploited children in Cambodia.

=== Anti-Human Trafficking Day ===
December 12 is observed as National Anti-Human Trafficking Day in Cambodia.

== Non-governmental organizations ==
On the ground in Cambodia, a number of non-governmental organizations and non-profit organizations are working to combat human trafficking. These include AFESIP, the Somaly Mam Foundation, Hagar International, ECPAT, and Agape International Missions. There are also other development partners that work together to fight against human trafficking.
