= Corruption in Cambodia =

Corruption in Cambodia is a pervasive problem. Examples of areas where Cambodians encounter corrupt practices in their everyday lives include obtaining medical services, dealing with alleged traffic violations, and pursuing fair court verdicts. Companies are urged to be aware when dealing with extensive red tape when obtaining licenses and permits, especially construction-related permits, and that the demand for and supply of bribes are commonplace in this process. The 2010 Anti-Corruption Law does not protect whistleblowers, and whistleblowers can be jailed for up to 6 months if they report corruption that cannot be proven.

== Extent ==
Human trafficking and sex trafficking in Cambodia are significant problems. The anti-human-trafficking unit in Phnom Penh is the epitome of that. Bribes to arrest innocent people have been accepted and sexual favors from prostitutes have been demanded and recorded by NGOs.

In Transparency International's 2025 Corruption Perceptions Index, which scored 182 countries on a scale from 0 ("highly corrupt") to 100 ("very clean"), Cambodia scored 20. When ranked by score, Cambodia ranked 163rd among the 182 countries in the Index, where the country ranked first is perceived to have the most honest public sector. For comparison with regional scores, the best score among those countries of the Asia Pacific region that appeared in the Index (Note: Afghanistan, Australia, Bangladesh, Bhutan, Brunei Darussalam, Cambodia, China, Fiji, Hong Kong, India, Indonesia, Japan, North Korea, South Korea, Laos, Malaysia, Maldives, Mongolia, Myanmar, Nepal, New Zealand, Pakistan, Papua New Guinea, Philippines, Singapore, Solomon Islands, Sri Lanka, Taiwan, Thailand, Timor-Leste, Vanuatu, Vietnam) was 84, the average score was 45 and the worst score was 15. For comparison with worldwide scores, the best score was 89 (ranked 1), the average score was 42, and the worst score was 9 (ranked 181, in a two-way tie).

== Anti-corruption efforts ==
In 2010, the government established the National Arbitration Center, Cambodia's first alternative dispute resolution mechanism, to enable companies to resolve commercial disputes more quickly and inexpensively than through the court system. While the official operation of the center was delayed until early 2012, in January 2012, the National Assembly passed Cambodia's first law on public procurement in a bid to fight endemic corruption in the public sector.

The Cambodian government passed the Anti-Corruption Law in March 2010. Under the new law, any official found guilty of corruption can face up to 15 years in prison. Under Cambodia's Anti-Corruption Law, people who resort to facilitation payments to obtain government services will now face harsh penalties; this also applies to government officials on the receiving end.

== See also ==
- Crime in Cambodia
