= Mech Dara =

Cambodian journalist

Mech Dara (Khmer: ម៉ិច ដារ៉ា) is a Cambodian journalist. Dara has extensively reported on corruption and human trafficking. In 2023, he was honored by United States Secretary of State Antony Blinken for his work covering online scams, named as a 2023 Trafficking in Persons Report Hero. Dara previously worked for Cambodian newspapers The Cambodia Daily and The Phnom Penh Post, both of which were shut down by the government. He also reported for Voice of Democracy radio and website, which was shut down by the government in 2023.

== 2024 arrest ==
Dara was arrested on 1 October 2024 in Phnom Penh. He was charged with “incitement to provoke serious social chaos” resulting from social posts in September. Dara's arrest was condemned by the US State Department and the US Embassy in Phnom Penh. The Committee to Protect Journalists' senior Southeast Asia representative Shawn Crispin denounced the charges. He was released on bail on 24 October after he appeared to have made a public apology to Prime Minister Hun Manet and his father and predecessor Hun Sen. On 5 November, he said that he would quit journalism and work as a farmer instead.
