= Krisher =

Krisher is a surname, an Americanized form of Krischer. Notable people with the surname include:

- Bernard Krisher (1931–2019), American journalist
- Bill Krisher (1935–2025), American football player

== See also ==
- Oliver Krischer (born 1969), German politician
