= Molly Ball =

American political journalist and writer

- Ball in 2026 at Politics and Prose
- Education: Cherry Creek High School; Yale University
- Occupations: Political journalist; writer
- Spouse: David Kihara
- Awards: Toner Prize for Excellence in Political Reporting 2013; SPJ Sigma Delta Chi Award 2016

Molly Ball is an American political journalist and writer. She is the author of a 2020 biography of House Speaker Nancy Pelosi.

== Early life and education ==
Ball grew up in Idaho and Colorado. She graduated from Cherry Creek High School in the Denver suburb of Greenwood Village in 1997. She attended Yale University, where she wrote for The Yale Herald and graduated in 2001.

== Career ==
In 2001, Ball had a summer internship at The Washington Post, then in January 2002 moved to Cambodia and spent one year and three months reporting for The Cambodia Daily. She returned to the United States after being diagnosed with cancer. Subsequently, she has worked as a reporter for the Las Vegas Sun, Las Vegas Review-Journal, Politico, The Atlantic, Time, and The Wall Street Journal.

== Recognition ==
In 2019, Ball received the Gerald R. Ford Prize for Distinguished Reporting on the Presidency for her coverage of the Trump administration. Other awards she has received include the Lee Walczak Award for Political Analysis, the Sandy Hume Memorial Award for Excellence in Political Journalism, the Society of Professional Journalists' Sigma Delta Chi Award, and the Toner Prize for Excellence in Political Reporting. Ball received the 2020 Everett McKinley Dirksen Award for Distinguished Reporting of Congress from the National Press Foundation for her reporting on House Speaker Nancy Pelosi, which judges called "authoritative," "compelling" and "nuanced." She was recognized as Outstanding Journalist in Print in the 2020 Washington Women in Journalism awards.

== Criticisms, controversies and legal dispute ==
In 2015, James Taranto of The Wall Street Journal criticized Ball's treatment of a Trump supporter in an article Ball wrote for The Atlantic titled, "The Ecstasy of Donald Trump", observing that she described the supporter with "a leathery complexion and yellow teeth", which Taranto argued was an instance of media bias and disrespect towards ordinary citizens. In response, Ball wrote "In retrospect, I can see why my description struck people as a gratuitous attempt to caricature Trump supporters. But my intent was only to describe him frankly, in order to give readers a visual entry into the scene." In 2021, Ball's Time magazine article, "The Secret History of the Shadow Campaign That Saved the 2020 Election", described efforts by political groups, business leaders, and activists to influence the 2020 election. While Ball characterized this as protecting election integrity, critics questioned her journalistic ethics and objectivity.

In December 2019, Ball and The Atlantic were sued for defamation and invasion of privacy in the Tokyo District Court, Japan, by the family of Bernard Krisher over a piece by Ball titled "When the Presses Stop" published in January/February 2018 edition of the magazine. The case went to trial and settled in January 2024. As part of the legal settlement the magazine made numerous deletions, corrections and clarifications to the article. This included correcting Ball's claim that Krisher, who was her employer at The Cambodia Daily, did nothing to help her with a health insurance issue, which was proven false by emails showing Krisher had indeed attempted to assist her. Additionally, Ball was required to erase and destroy all copies of the photographs she had taken without the subjects' knowledge and consent during her visit to their private quarters.

== Personal life ==
Ball is of Jewish heritage. She lives in Arlington, Virginia with her husband, David Kihara, an editor at Politico, and their three children.

In 2007, she won $100,000 on the game show Who Wants to Be a Millionaire.
