= Drugs in Cambodia =

In Cambodia, drugs are readily available, thus, easy to access, including illegal substances.

== Illegal drugs ==
The Cambodian black market trade of illicit drugs includes cannabis, methamphetamine, ketamine, MDMA and heroin.

Cambodia remains a major supplier of cannabis to countries in East and Southeast Asia and other parts of the world. Large amounts of heroin are also smuggled throughout the (Golden Triangle). Drug abuse is increasing among street children and rates of HIV/AIDS are increasing due to intravenous drug usage.

=== Golden Triangle ===
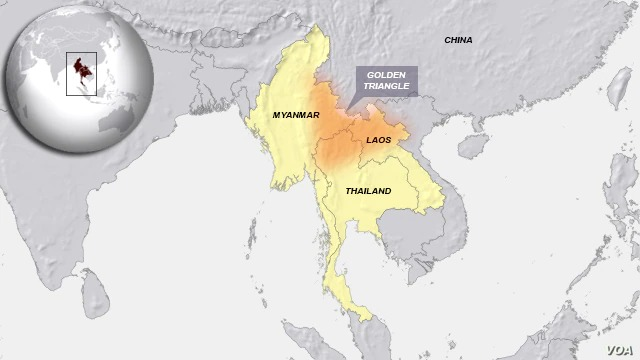

The Golden Triangle is one of Asia's main opium-producing areas with the other area being the Golden Crescent. The triangle is an area of roughly 350,000 square kilometers that overlaps the mountainous regions of four nations of Southeast Asian: Myanmar also known as Burma, Laos, and Thailand. The Golden Crescent is located at the intersection of Central, South, and Western Asia.

This area overlaps the borders of Afghanistan, Iran, and Pakistan with the mountainous regions which define the location of the crescent. In both of these areas illicit drugs are produced and traffickers export these drugs out of the country and or shipped throughout neighboring nations. The Ruak and Mekong rivers of these areas also influences the ease of how drugs are transported through this area.

The drugs are transported through the Triangle by horse and donkey caravans to refineries where the drugs are further processed and refined to become more pure. They are then most frequently brought to the United States and other countries by couriers traveling on commercial airlines or they are smuggled into the country by shipping containers.

=== Teng Bunma ===
Teng Bunma was one of the wealthiest people in Cambodia with connections to leading politicians, military officials, and businessmen. He is believed to have been one of the main Cambodian drug lords. Bunma was the owner of the luxury hotel "Intercontinental" in Phnom Penh and the "Rasmei Kampuchea," the largest daily newspaper in Cambodia with a circulation of about 18,000. For years Bunma was denied entry into the USA because of his appearance on the list of suspected drug dealers. A 1996 article, "Medellin on the Mekong" in the Hong Kong-based Far Eastern Economic Review, by United States journalist Nate Thayer, described Teng Bunma as a significant figure in Cambodia's international drug-smuggling trade.

=== Recent developments ===
Pertaining to the (online) drug market/trade which exists in Cambodia, more recently the trade took on its international intervention in which officials were able to prevent 10,000 tablets of Codeine and Valium being sent out of Cambodia to the United States and United Kingdom.

Johanne Vinther Axelsen, 55 of Denmark, was arrested and convicted of drug trafficking and was sentenced to 15 years in prison. It is alleged she tried to mail out illegal drugs that she claims did not know were illegal out of Cambodia to the United States and United Kingdom on the behalf of her drug dealing son, Niels Eikeland. Many human rights activists in Denmark are advocating for the release of Axelsen due to the inhumane conditions of the prison and the Danish government are trying to work with Cambodian officials in order to appeal the court ruling. She was later released due to work of diplomacy and a private payment of 8.000 $ to officials so they would bend their policies

In mid-2008 three foreign nationals were arrested in Cambodia on charges of possessing, consuming, and intending to sell drugs A Taiwanese-American, Pakistani, and Britain national along with a Cambodian citizen were among the arrested. They were allegedly caught in possession of nearly half a kilo of methamphetamines and cocaine. The men potentially face life sentences if they are to be convicted.

These recent developments and arrests only further emphasizes that Cambodia is cracking down on the drug trade which exists in the country. According to secretary-general of the National Authority to Combat Drugs they emphasized that ‘There will be further raids. We are cracking down hard on people who provide illegal drugs.’

On April 10, 2009, four drug traders and traffickers, including two Cambodian nationals were prosecuted and arrested. The four had established a ring to transport synthetic drugs from Cambodia to Vietnam across the border for the drugs to be distributed in cafes, bars, and discos. According to initial investigators, the ring had been operating for nearly a decade

In June 2024, the National Police and the National Authority to Combating Drugs seized and destroyed 7 tons of illicit drugs, mostly methamphetamine, as part of a larger crackdown operation.

== See also ==
- Crime in Cambodia
