= Asian Access =

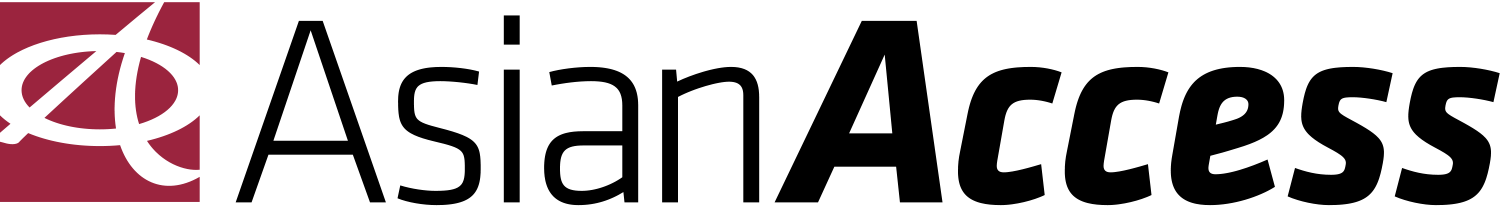
- Founded: 1965
- Website: A2 Official Website

Asian Access (A2) is a non-profit evangelical organization dedicated to the development of Christian leaders of the Church throughout Asia. It was established in 1967 by Ken W. and was formerly known as LIFE Ministries. The foundation resides in 18 countries, including Japan, Mongolia, and Cambodia. In each country, they seek to build key leaders who will lead the Church in vision, character, and competence.

After the 2011 Tohoku earthquake and tsunami in Japan, Asian Access provided donations, relief, and assistance in the affected areas. Their alumni have taken initiative to combat sex trafficking in Cambodia and other countries. Its mission is to find, promote, and deliver new leaders for the church, expand leaders and congregations, and grow followers of Jesus Christ. Its stated objectives are to give leaders the tools to be lifelong followers of Christ, support one another in Christlike community, catalyze mission movements, and also make headway in addressing global crises and social issues. The mission addresses issues at a national and communal level.

As of 2019, they were operating in 18 countries, including Cambodia, Japan, Korea, Mongolia, Myanmar, the Philippines, Sri Lanka, and Thailand. Their stated goal is to expand to 20 countries in the near future.

== History ==
The official date of establishment is 1965, when the organization was founded under the name, Language Institute For Evangelism (L.I.F.E). Between the years 1967 and 1980, the ministry focused on teaching English conversation in churches across Japan. Over the next 15 years, the organization saw an increase in career missionaries and a proliferation of ministries that included English teaching outreach, sports evangelism, worship ministry, pastor training, and church planting. The name was changed to L.I.F.E. Ministries to reflect its expanded focus beyond English teaching. By 1995, LIFE Ministries directed its attention to church and leader development. In 1990, LIFE initiated the 20/20 Vision with the goal of expanding to 100 church multiplication teams and sending out 1,000 missionaries from Japan to the rest of Asia. Through their leadership program, Japan Church Growth Institute, they established a network of leaders in ten major regions of Japan. Those leaders were trained through the organization to become reproducing disciple makers and church planters.

=== Asian Access ===
LIFE Ministries first explored expansion in Asia in 1996 when it began holding pastor training sessions in Mongolia. To reflect the new focus on expanding leadership training throughout Asia, LIFE Ministries went through a second name change. In October 2002, Asian Access was approved as the new title. In order to see more missionaries partner with Japanese pastors to plant churches in Japan, Asian Access launched a partnership with SIM USA in 2011. A2.business was launched in 2014 to focus on mission in the workplace, initiating a more genuine community that is focused on Jesus Christ within each social context.

== Leaders ==
Joseph W. Handley, Jr. (2008–present) is the current president of Asian Access, the successor of three leaders. He has been in office since 2008. The founder of Asian Access was Ken W (1965-1987). His successor was Dr. Stephen T. Hoke (1988-1990), and following, Rev. Dr. S. Douglas Birdsall (1991-2007), chairman of the Lausanne Movement.

== Awards ==
- MissioNexus honored Asian Access for excellence in communications (2019)
- MissioNexus honored Asian Access, along with SIM, in 2012 with the eXcelerate Award for Innovation in Partnership
