= Voice of Democracy =

News agency in Cambodia

- Native name: វីអូឌី
- Company type: News agency
- Industry: Media
- Founded: January 2003; 22 years ago
- Defunct: February 13, 2023
- Headquarters: Phnom Penh, Cambodia
- Area served: Cambodia
- Parent: Cambodian Center for Independent Media
- Website: vodenglish.news vodkhmer.news

Voice of Democracy (Khmer: សំលេងប្រជាធិបតេយ្យ; abbreviated VOD) was an independent news agency based in Cambodia. VOD has provided significant investigative journalism within Cambodia, providing coverage on domestic issues including corruption, government wrongdoing, human rights violations, and environmental destruction, which have drawn the ire of Cambodian officials. Following the Cambodian government's media crackdown in 2017, VOD, alongside Radio Free Asia and Voice of America, became an increasingly important news source for Cambodians. It was shuttered by the Cambodian government on 13 February 2023.

== History ==
VOD began as a non-profit radio station which first aired in January 2003 under the supervision of the Cambodian Center for Human Rights. In 2007, it was moved under the Cambodian Center for Independent Media (CCIM). VOD launched online news portals in 2013.

VOD became an increasingly important media outlet after the Cambodian government shuttered the independent The Cambodia Daily and forced the sale of The Phnom Penh Post to a pro-government owner in 2017. VOD launched its English language version in 2019 to fill a void in independent English language media.

In February 2023, Cambodia's prime minister Hun Sen revoked VOD's operating license, in retaliation for a VOD news article that alleged Sen's son, Hun Manet, had violated existing policy by approving a foreign aid package for the 2023 Turkey–Syria earthquake. VOD's closure was condemned by organisations including Amnesty International, Human Rights Watch, the United Nations, and the American and German governments. HRW described the shutdown as a "devastating blow to media freedom in [Cambodia]." The US Department of State called the Cambodian government's response "particularly troubling" on its detrimental impact to freedom of speech and access to 2023 Cambodian general election coverage.

== Awards ==
In 2004, Oudam Tat, a VOD radio reporter, was awarded Reporters Without Borders' Information Hero award.

== See also ==
- Media in Cambodia
