= Somaly Mam =

Cambodian writer and activist

- ម៉ម សុម៉ាលី
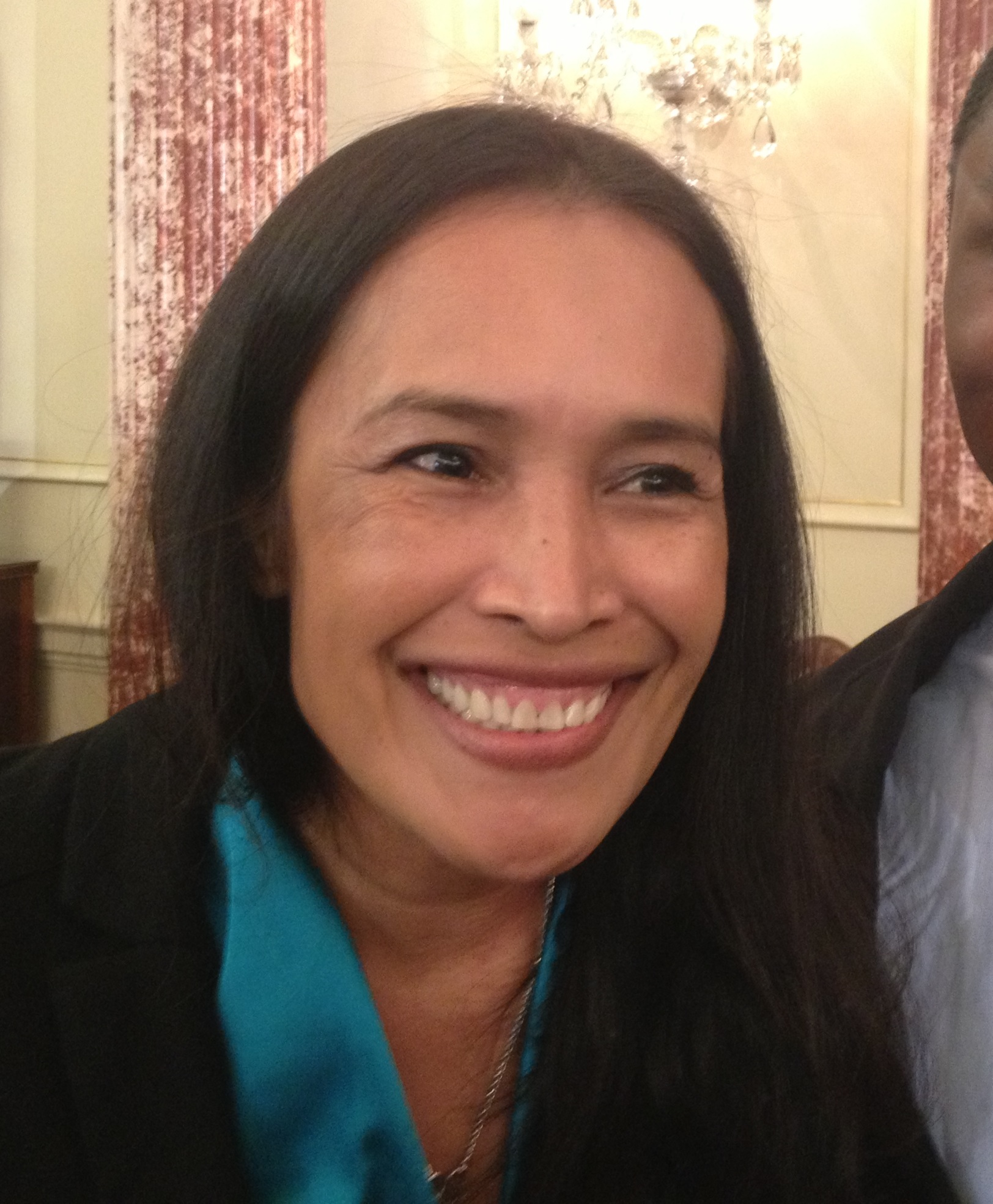
- Mam in 2013
- Born: 1970 or 1971; Mondulkiri, Khmer Republic
- Occupation: Former CEO of Somaly Mam Foundation
- Known for: Anti-sex-trafficking
- Spouse: Pierre Legros (m. 1993; div. 2008)

Somaly Mam (Khmer: ម៉ម សុម៉ាលី [mɑːm somaːliː]; born 1970/71) is a Cambodian anti-trafficking advocate who focuses primarily on sex trafficking. From 1996 to 2014, Mam was involved in campaigns against sex trafficking. She set up the Somaly Mam Foundation, raised money, appeared on major television programs, and spoke at international events.

After allegations of lying had appeared in The Cambodia Daily in 2012 and 2013, Newsweek ran a cover story in May 2014, claiming that Mam had fabricated stories of abuse about herself and others. After the Somaly Mam Foundation undertook its own investigation through Goodwin Procter, a Boston-based law firm, she resigned from her position, and the foundation shut down in October 2014. She moved back to live in Cambodia, before returning to the US later that year to begin new fundraising activities.

== Early life ==
Mam was born to a tribal minority family in Mondulkiri Province, Cambodia. In her memoir, The Road of Lost Innocence, she states that she was born in either 1970, or 1971.

Mam was investigated by a journalist working in Cambodia, and his allegations that key parts of her early life were false were carried by Newsweek in May 2014. Mam resigned from the Somaly Mam Foundation shortly thereafter. An investigation by Marie Claire magazine came to a different conclusion, finding witnesses that supported Mam's story and contradicted Newsweek's allegations.

In her book Mam said she attended school in Cambodia, but did not graduate. According to the Newsweek article, Mam did graduate and found two students and a teacher to support their claims, but Marie Claire quotes the school director remembering she attended only three years of school.

Mam said that she was abused by her "grandfather" until she was approximately 14 and that she was sold to a brothel and forced into prostitution and that she was also forced to marry a stranger. She has claimed that she was forced to prostitute herself on the streets and made to have sex with five or six clients per day.

Mam left Cambodia for Paris in 1993 where she married a French citizen, Pierre Legros. They divorced in 2008.

== Charity and achievements ==
Mam was an untrained healthcare worker with Médecins Sans Frontières and, in her spare time, handed out condoms, soap, and information to women in the brothels. In 1996, she co-founded AFESIP (Agir pour les Femmes en Situation Precaire or "Acting for Women in Distressing Situations"), a Cambodian NGO dedicated to rescuing, housing and rehabilitating women and children in Cambodia, Laos, and Vietnam who have been sexually exploited. AFESIP conducts outreach work to try helping the women still enslaved. The organization also works with law enforcement to raid the brothels. The company has locations in Cambodia, Laos, and Vietnam.

In June 2007, Mam co-founded the Somaly Mam Foundation, a nonprofit organization formed in the United States that supported anti-trafficking groups and helped women and girls who had been forced into sexual slavery. The Somaly Mam Foundation (SMF) attracted the support of U.S. business leaders and Hollywood stars. SMF was the global fundraising arm of Somaly Mam's Phnom Penh-based AFESIP.

After the May 2014 Newsweek article questioning Mam's claims, the Somaly Mam Foundation undertook its own investigation by Goodwin Procter, a Boston-based law firm. Mam resigned from her position and later the foundation shut down in October 2014. In January 2015, Mam and former operations director of SMF Rigmor Schneider launched a New Somaly Mam Fund as a funding source for AFESIP. In 2016, a new charity, Together1heart, became the primary fundraising vehicle for AFESIP. Actress AnnaLynne McCord is CEO of Together1heart. Posts on the group's Facebook page suggest that Mam is still heavily involved, and McCord insists that Mam is a "survivor" and appears to absolve her of wrongdoing, while stating that neither Together1heart nor AFESIP has made changes as a result of the 2014 public relations crisis.

== Scrutiny of Mam's stories ==
Scrutiny of Mam's story began with comments she made at the United Nations. Speaking on a United Nations panel to member states, international aid organizations and the media in New York on 3 April, Mam stated that eight girls had been killed after her organization AFESIP conducted a high-profile raid on a massage parlor at the Chai Hour II Hotel in Phnom Penh, where 83 women and girls were taken and placed in her refuge center. Somaly Mam has since admitted that this was "inaccurate" and that the Cambodian army had not killed eight girls.

On 25 April 2012, the Cambodia Daily newspaper reported Mam's ex-husband and one-time AFESIP director Pierre Legros, saying that Mam had misrepresented an incident involving their daughter in 2004. Mam had long claimed that the teenager was kidnapped and raped by human traffickers in retaliation for her raid on the Chai Hour II Hotel. In her 2007 autobiography, Mam wrote that the people involved in the kidnapping of her daughter were released from jail, though a trial was pending. Legros said their daughter was not kidnapped, but had run away with her boyfriend, and that in his view the abduction story was a means of "marketing for the Somaly Mam Foundation". The U.S. Ambassador at the time, Joseph Mussomeli, wrote in a diplomatic cable in 2004 that Mam claimed that Mam's daughter had been "lured by her peers" to Battambang Province and that she was later found in a night club there in the company of three men who were arrested and charged with trafficking. Cambodian officials told the newspaper they had no record of such events.

In October 2013, the Cambodia Daily alleged a further deception took place in January 1998, when Mam was propelled into the international media spotlight largely owing to the on-camera testimony of the young Meas Ratha and other alleged victims of Cambodia's child sex industry. Mam's work as president of AFESIP was being featured on French television as part of the popular weekly show Envoyé spécial. Ratha, then a teenager of about 14 years from Takeo province, told a story of sexual slavery in an unspecified brothel somewhere in Phnom Penh. Sixteen years later, Ratha (now 32 years old and married) told the newspaper that her testimony for the France 2 channel was fabricated and scripted for her by Mam as a means of drumming up support for the organization. Ratha said, "The video that you see, everything that I put in is not my story."

On 1 June 2015 the Phnom Penh Post, in an article based on recently released State Department cables, revealed that the United States government "...knew about the now-infamous deceptions and malpractice within organisations run by Somaly Mam for years prior to the media exposés". The article cites a cable titled Somaly Mam Under Microscope sent to the State Department from the US embassy in Phnom Penh on 8 May 2012. Speaking of Mam's claim that her daughter was abducted in 2006 in revenge for an AFESIP raid on a Phnom Penh brothel in 2004, the cable says: "Ms Mam has made this claim on numerous occasions despite having reported to post [the embassy] at the time of the incident that the girl was not kidnapped but rather lured by her peers from Phnom Penh to Battambang". The embassy cable quoted sources in the anti-trafficking community in Phnom Penh as saying that Mam was "rotten to the core," but as having made a "strategic decision to remain silent on concerns about AFESIP's accounting systems and general lack of financial controls to avoid putting … other anti-[trafficking] NGOs 'at risk'".

== Resignation ==
On 28 May 2014, after the Newsweek exposé, and receiving the report from lawyers, Mam resigned from the Somaly Mam Foundation. In late 2014, Mam returned to New York, hoping to restore her reputation and launched a public relations campaign, hiring publicity firm Jonathan Marder & Company. Mam protested her innocence in a September 2014 interview in Marie Claire, and launched the New Somaly Mam Fund soon after.

In October 2014 the Cambodian government announced that Mam would be prohibited from operating an NGO, but days later appeared to withdraw the prohibition. By December 2014 she was accepting donations for a new NGO with headquarters in Texas, "The New Somaly Mam Fund: Voices for Change". As was the case with her previous venture, US actress Susan Sarandon was recruited to sit on the board of the charity. "I hope that chapter is closed. I am very comfortable that what she is saying is the truth. The new organization will not rescue women and girls but collaborate with other NGOs to rehabilitate and educate them once they are free so they can find jobs", the co-founder of the 'fund', Rigmor Schneider told a reporter, and explained plans to operate two residential centres. "Basically what we're looking for now is funding."

On 9 October 2014, in an interview in Global Post, Mam's ex-husband and co-founder of AFESIP Pierre Legros said: "When you work in this world, you know fabricated stories are used by everyone to get funding." He was more concerned about "mismanagement and sexual abuse allegations within a shelter in 2006." He said that he wished "to denounce the logic of a failing system praising 'development'."

== Honors and awards ==
(Newest first)

- POSCO TJ Park Prize, POSCO TJ Park Foundation, 2012
- The Guardian Top 100 Women: Activists and Campaigners, 2011
- The Daily Beast Women in the World, 2011
- TIME magazine's 100 most influential people, with the accompanying article written by actress Angelina Jolie, 2009
- World's Children's Prize for the Rights of the Child in Sweden for her "dangerous struggle" to defend the rights of children in Cambodia. (2008)
- Roland Berger Human Dignity Award 2008
- Honorary Doctor of Public Service from Regis University (2007)
- CNN Hero, 2006
- Olympic flag bearer, 2006 Winter Olympics Opening Ceremony, Torino, Italy.
- Glamour magazine named Somaly Mam "Woman of the Year" in 2006
- Prince of Asturias Award for International Cooperation in the presence of Queen Sofía of Spain, 1998

No date given:

- "Mimosa D'Oro"
- Festival du Scoop Prize, France
- Excmo Ayuntaniento de Galdar Concejalia de Servicio Sociale, Spain
- U.S. State Department "Heroes of Anti-Trafficking" award.

== Bibliography ==
- Mam, Somaly (2009). The Road of Lost Innocence. Random House Publishing. ISBN 978-0385526227.
