= Joseph W. Handley =

Joseph W. Handley Jr.
- Known for: President of Asian Access

Joseph W. Handley, Jr. (2008–present) is the president of Asian Access, a non-profit evangelical organization dedicated to the development of leaders of the Church throughout Asia originally established in 1967. He has been the president since 2008, leading movements including developing an award-winning partnership with SIM USA and prompting the mission to invest in several natural disasters that most notably helped the people of Japan and Nepal. Under his guidance, Asian Access started both A2.business and the Pan Asia Leader Development program as well as partnered in the development of the Nozomi Project in Japan. Previously, he was the founding director of Azusa Pacific University's Office of World Mission and lead mission pastor at Rolling Hills Covenant Church.

== Education ==
Handley received a B.A. in psychology and an M.A. in theology from Azusa Pacific University in 1992. As of 2020, he received his Ph.D. in Intercultural Studies at Fuller Theological Seminary.

== Career ==
Handley served nine years at Azusa Pacific University, where he founded the Office of World Missions and led the first multi-national high school mission congress to Mexico City in 1996. He transitioned to Rolling Hills Covenant Church in 1998, where he served as the Global Outreach Pastor and later as the Associate Pastor for Outreach Ministries. He led relief efforts Hurricane Katrina and expanded the church's outreach through Kazakhstan, to focus on the Silk Road. He promoted holistic forms of mission through broader investment in countries such as Congo, South Africa, and others. During his tenure, Handley established over 100 missional partnerships and relocated his family to Istanbul, Turkey, for one year to study church planting and leader development.

In July 2008, Handley became the fourth president of Asian Access, a leader development organization established in 1967. He is credited with developing an award-winning partnership with SIM USA and leading the organization’s responses to natural disaster in Japan and Nepal. He also launched A2.business, the Pan Asia Leader Development program, and the Nozomi Project. He continues to advance the mission's vision of reaching 20 countries by 2020. As of now, the organization partners with 16 Asian countries.

Handley contributes to the Billy Graham Center’s EvangelVision Blog. He serves as a senior advisor for the International Orality Network and sits on the advisory teams of ELEVATE, BiblicalTraining.org, and DualReach. In 2020, he completed a Ph.D. in Intercultural Studies at Fuller Theological Seminary. Handley is also a regular guest on Mission Network News, offering insights on current events in Asia.

== Honors ==
Missio Nexus eXcelerate Award: “Excellence in Mission” for communications.

== Personal ==
Handley is a second-generation Christian pastor, following the footsteps of his father, Joe Handley Sr. He was born and raised in Rowland Heights, California. While attending Azusa Pacific University, he met his wife, Vasilka Demitroff Handley. They have three children, all born in California. Currently, Handley and his wife live in Japan to work closely with Asian Access as the mission expands. He recently completed his Ph.D. in intercultural studies at Fuller Theological Seminary.
