= Sar Sokha =

Cambodian politician

His Excellency Sar Sokha
- ស សុខា

Deputy Prime Minister of Cambodia
- Incumbent
- Assumed office 22 August 2023
- Prime Minister: Hun Manet

Minister of Interior
- Incumbent
- Assumed office 22 August 2023
- Prime Minister: Hun Manet
- Preceded by: Sar Kheng

Member of Parliament for Prey Veng
- Incumbent
- Assumed office 21 August 2023

Secretary of State of Education, Youth and Sport
- In office 6 September 2018 – 21 August 2023
- Prime Minister: Hun Sen
- Minister: Hangchuon Naron

Personal details
- Born: 4 June 1981 (age 45) Prey Veng, People's Republic of Kampuchea
- Party: Cambodian People's Party
- Relations: Sar Kheng (father)

Military service
- Allegiance: Cambodia
- Branch/service: Cambodian National Police
- Rank: General

Sar Sokha (Khmer: ស សុខា; born 4 June 1981) is a Cambodian politician and police general who currently serves as deputy prime minister and Minister of Interior. He was the secretary of state at the Ministry of Education, Youth and Sport. He is the son of former Interior Minister Sar Kheng.

== Early life and education ==
Sar Sokha is the eldest son of Samdech Krala Hom Sar Kheng, the former Deputy Prime Minister, Minister of Interior, and Vice President of the Cambodian People's Party. He was born in 1981 in Prey Veng Province.

Sar Sokha studied in France and earned his PhD. He also pursued studies in Germany, the Czech Republic, and Singapore, focusing on rural development, science, education, civil law management, sub-national administration, police and military skills. He is fluent in both French and English.

== Career ==
Sar Sokha used to serve as a police officer within the Ministry of Interior, assisting his father, Samdech Krala Hom Sar Kheng, who held positions including Phnom Penh Deputy Police Commissioner responsible for public order, and Secretary of State within the Ministry of Education. Moreover, he was appointed as the Chairman of the Board of the National University of Meanchey in Banteay Meanchey, the National University of Battambang in Battambang, and the Chea Sim Kamchay Mear National University of Prey Veng.

Furthermore, Sar Sokha has been designated as the President of the Union of Youth Federations of Cambodia (UYFC) in Prey Veng, Battambang, and Banteay Meanchey. Sar Sokha held a seat in the Cambodian People's Party as a Member of Parliament for Prey Veng during two terms. Moreover, in the 2023 national election, he was successfully elected as a Member of Parliament for Prey Veng Province.

== Personal life ==
He is married to Ke Suon Sophy. They have four children (two sons and two daughters). Sar Sokha's wife is the youngest daughter of General Ke Kim Yan, the Deputy Prime Minister in charge of the National Authority for Combating Drugs, and Mao Malay Ke Kim Yan.
