= Agape International Missions =

American non-profit organisation

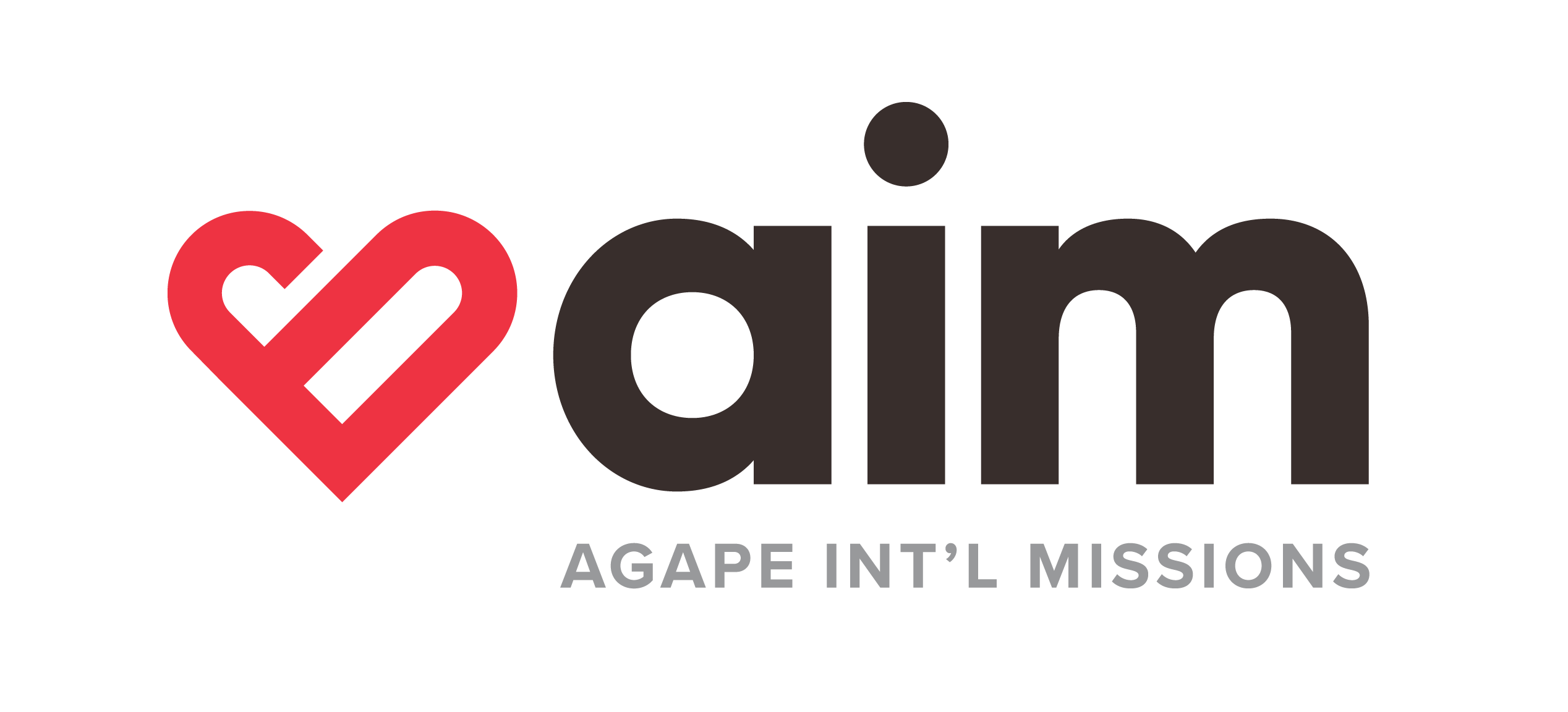
- Abbreviation: AIM
- Formation: 1989 (US), 2006 (Cambodia)
- Type: NGO
- Purpose: Combating sex trafficking in Cambodia
- Headquarters: Roseville, California
- Founders: Don and Bridget Brewster
- CEO: Clayton Butler
- Board Chair: Ken Petersen
- Website: aimfree.org

Agape International Missions (AIM) is a non-denominational NGO combating sex trafficking in Cambodia.

== Operations ==
Headquartered in California, AIM works to rescue victims of sex trafficking and provide rescued victims with housing, education, health, employment, rehabilitation, and community care.

In 2014, AIM launched a SWAT team, authorized by the Cambodian government, to investigate and raid illegal brothels in conjunction with the Cambodian National Police's Anti-Human Trafficking Unit. AIM also rescues girls and women sex trafficked to China.

AIM received GuideStar USA, Inc.'s gold seal of transparency in 2019. Charity Navigator gave AIM the highest rating of 4 out of 4 stars and a score of 100 out of 100 for accountability & transparency.

== History ==
AIM was founded in 1989 by Bridget and Don Brewster, a former pastor in California, and began operations in Cambodia in 2006. The organization opened its first shelter and restoration center for former child sex slaves in the village of Svay Pak, Cambodia.

In 2022, it was reported that AIM has assisted the Cambodian government in its controversial crack-down on surrogacy in Cambodia. This followed the Cambodian government's ban on commercial surrogacy prompted by the organization's concerns that women were exploited by the industry.
