= Hagar International =

Humanitarian organization in Hanoi, Vietnam

- Named after: The biblical story of Hagar in Genesis 16-21
- Founder: Pierre Tami
- Founded at: Cambodia
- Type: NGO
- Region served: Worldwide
- Website: hagarinternational.org

Hagar International is a Swiss-based global humanitarian nonprofit organization offering services and assistance to people who have escaped sexual slavery and/or human trafficking. It is focused on helping victims with recovery, and was founded in Cambodia in 1994 by Pierre Tami. Hagar started providing services to Afghanistan and Vietnam in 2009. It expanded to Myanmar in 2014. Hagar International has been noted for working with male victims in addition to women and children. A main goal is to help victims achieve stability and financial independence though skill-based training and job opportunity programs. Hagar International recommends an ongoing process which starts with the victim, then the victim's family, and finally helps integrate them into the community. The organization often works directly with local and federal governments to improve social services. Several children from their special "catch-up" schools have been able to graduate and go to university. They have a legal protection unit, which was established in 2011, and helps provide legal services and representation in court.

Hagar International was named after the biblical character Hagar from the Book of Genesis 16–21. Hagar, a slave, had a child with her master Abraham because his wife Sarai could not bear him any children. After having a child, she began to despise her mistress Sarai, who mistreated her in turn. Hagar ran away, but was told by God to return. Some years later, she was again sent away by her mistress with her child Ishmael to wander in the wilderness.
