= Sex trafficking in Cambodia =

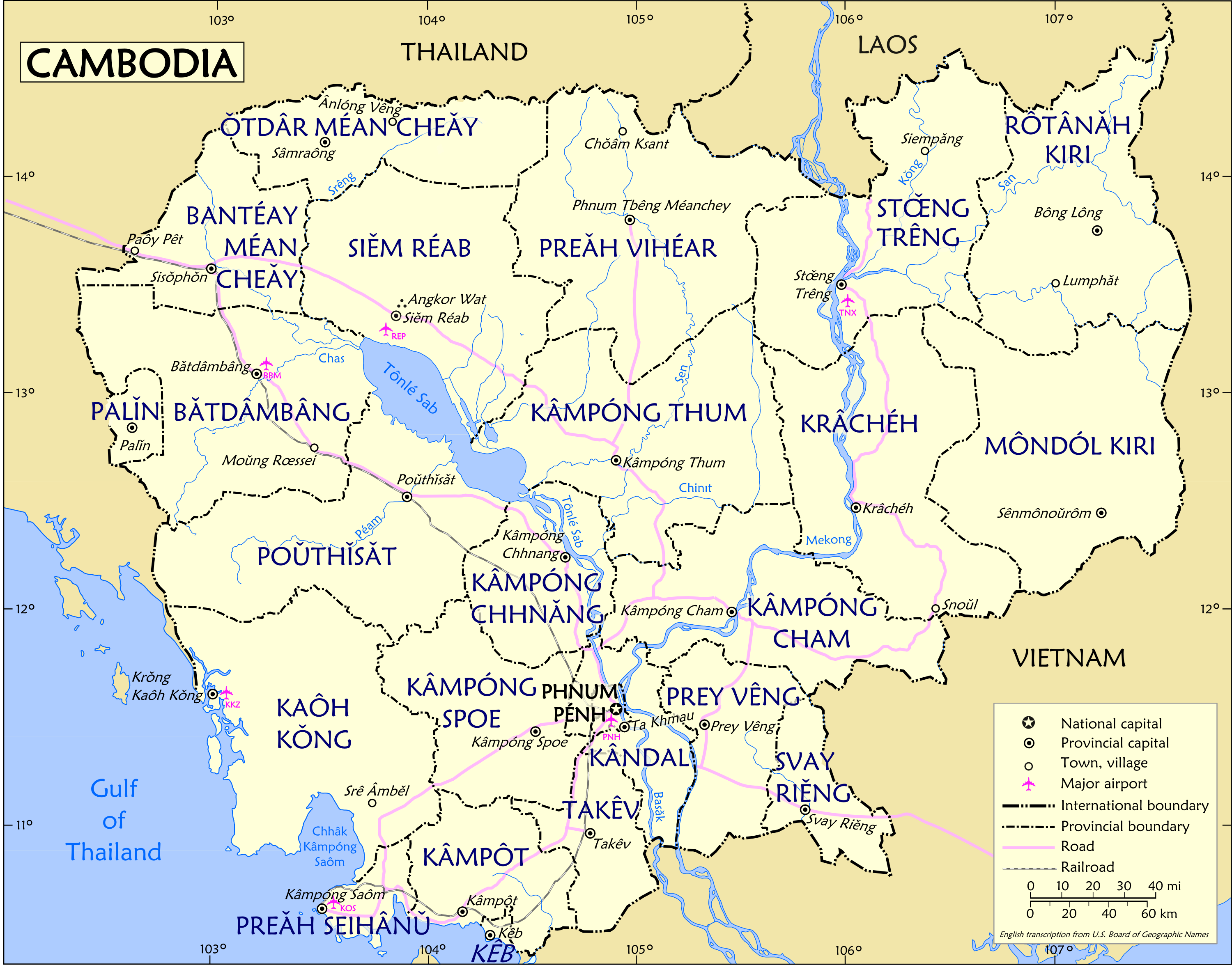
Women and girls are sex trafficked in and out of all the provinces of Cambodia. They are raped and physically and psychologically harmed in brothels, homes, hotels, and other locations throughout these administrative divisions.

Sex trafficking in Cambodia is human trafficking for the purpose of sexual exploitation and slavery that occurs in the Kingdom of Cambodia. Cambodia is a country of origin, destination and transit for sex trafficked persons.

Sex trafficking victims in the country are from all ethnic groups in Cambodia and foreigners. Cambodian citizens, primarily women and girls, have been sex trafficked within the country and throughout the world. They are threatened and forced into prostitution, marriages, and or pregnancies. Sex trafficked victims experience physically and psychologically trauma. Some are tortured and murdered.

Sex trafficking and exploitation occur at all levels of Cambodian society. Male and female perpetrators in Cambodia come from many backgrounds. A number of traffickers are members of or facilitated by gangs. Pedophiles travel to Cambodia for sex tourism. The extent of sex trafficking in Cambodia is not known because of the lack data, the underground nature of sex trafficking crimes, and other factors. Anti-sex trafficking initiatives have been impeded by corruption, apathy, border management problems, fractured social institutions, weak law enforcement, and more. UNICEF states that some 37 % of the victims trafficked for sexual exploitation in Cambodia are children.

== Victims ==
Cambodian women and girls are sex trafficked into China, Hong Kong, Vietnam, Japan, and other countries throughout the world. They are imposed by coercion into marriages or brothels, including phony massage parlors and karaoke bars, and unfree labour in homes or on farms. Many are tied or locked up in dark rooms without restrooms and abused.

Many trafficked victims are taken into hotels, which are harder to detect than brothels. Survivors recall being terrified and crying often. Some attempt suicide. Many victims are drugged. Victims are sometimes forced by traffickers to get virginity certificates at hospitals. Women and girls from families in poverty and that lack education, as well as children and minorities, are vulnerable to sex trafficking.

== Perpetrators ==
The traffickers are often part of gangs. The perpetrators are sometimes the victims' family parents, neighbors, or friends.

== Online forced prostitution ==
There has been a rise in online prostitution and cybersex trafficking in twenty-first century Cambodia. The global spread of high-speed internet and increase in computer, tablet, and smart phone ownership has fueled online sex abuse. Some sex trafficked women and girls in Cambodia are forced to be on live-streaming pornography sharing and dark web sites via webcams that are sometimes paid with cryptocurrency and or use encrypted technology by clients worldwide..

== Anti-sex trafficking efforts ==
The government has taken some initiatives to reduce sex trafficking, but these are inadequate.

== Corruption ==
Corruption and impunity have hindered anti-sex trafficking efforts in Cambodia. Some officials and police have colluded with the traffickers.

== Non-governmental organizations ==
Friends-International and Agape International Missions (AIM) conduct anti-sex trafficking efforts in Cambodia. AIM created its own brothel-raiding SWAT team that works alongside the Cambodian police to capture traffickers and rescue girls. Other organizations fighting against sex trafficking include the International Organisation for Migration, APLE Cambodia, the International Justice Mission, and Chab Dai Cambodia.

== See also ==
- Prostitution in Cambodia
- Crime in Cambodia
