= Crime in Cambodia =

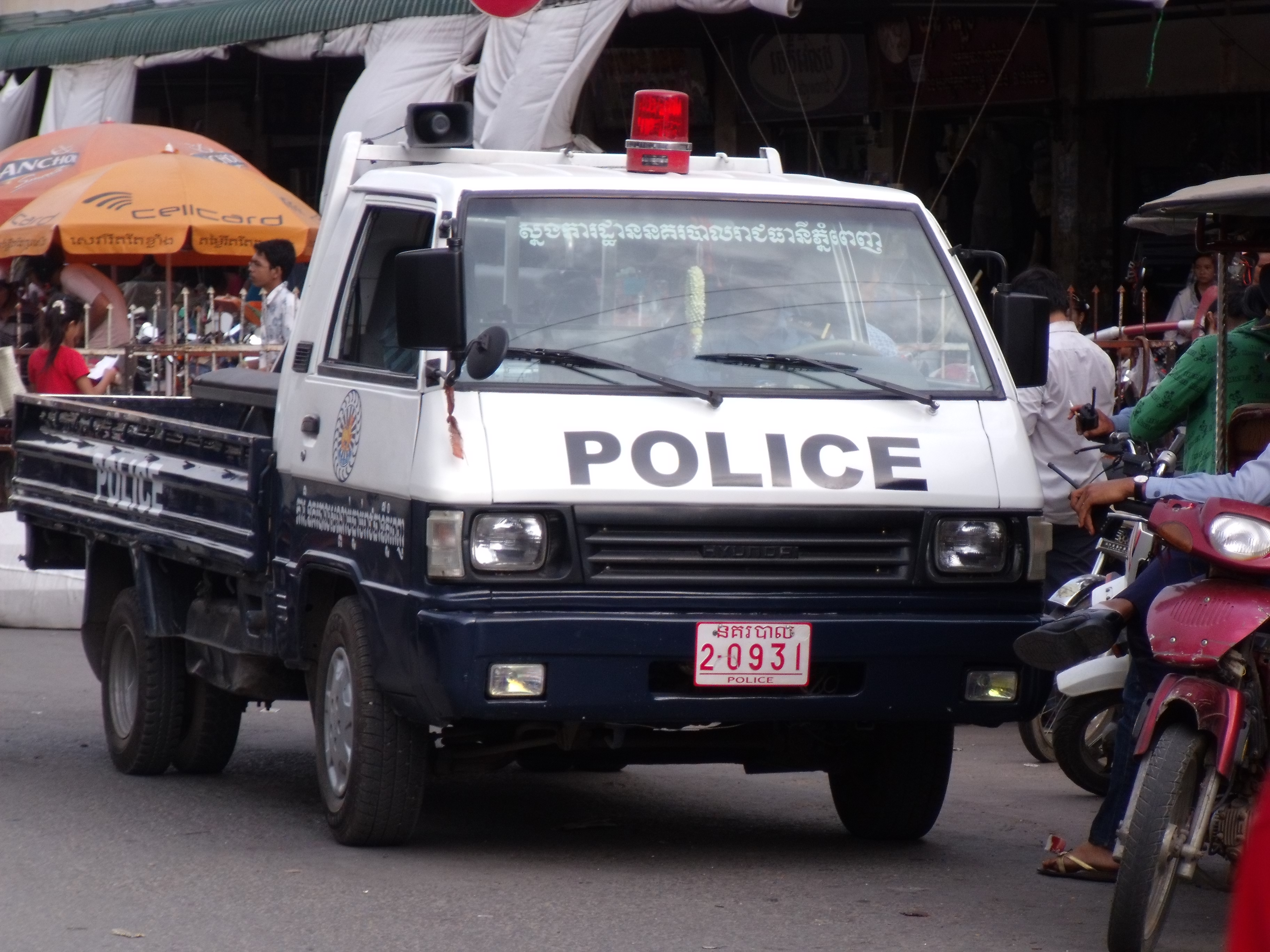
A Cambodian police pick-up truck in Phnom Penh

Crime in Cambodia is present in various forms.

== Crime by type ==
=== Corruption ===
The rate of corruption in Cambodia is high; one source goes on to describe the situation as "nothing less than obscene". Corruption is considered a large expense to the Cambodian government. The Cambodian police force is known to inappropriately use violence in certain cases. The misuse of ferocity has raised concerns from the Human Rights Watch. Petty crime is common, with tourist areas often targeted. This includes snatch theft and pick-pocketing. Perpetrators are usually stricken with poverty, and as a result are driven to steal from foreigners with the knowledge that they bring about a significant amount of money and other valuable items. Owing to the easy accessibility of arms, armed robbery also occurs.

=== Fraud ===
Tens of thousands of Asians from different countries have been lured to casinos and resorts in Cambodia, and also to Laos and Myanmar. These victims are then forced to work in illegal online-gambling or online scam operations.

=== Illegal logging ===
Illegal logging poses a large threat to Cambodia's forests. It allows for undocumented and unauthorized deforestation in which allows for the exploitation of Cambodia's forests. There are many cases in which the military carries out illegal logging without knowledge from the government. It is difficult for central government officials to visit areas still controlled by former Pol Pot forces. Illegal commercial timber interests take advantage of weak law enforcement to benefit from illegal cutting. The majority of illegal deforestation is done by the military and powerful sub-contractors.

=== Murder ===
In 2013, Cambodia had a homicide rate of 2.4 per 100,000 population.

=== Prostitution ===
Prostitution is against the law in Cambodia, but still present and only growing. Le Thi Quy, a professor from the Women's Research Center, interviewed a handful of females in 1993 about prostitution; three quarters of the interviewees found being a prostitute to be a norm and a profession they felt was not shameful having. That same year, the professor estimated that there were some one hundred thousand sex workers in the country.

=== Robbery ===
Petty crime is common, with tourist areas often targeted. This includes snatch theft and pick-pocketing. Perpetrators are usually stricken with poverty, and as a result are driven to steal from foreigners with the knowledge that they bring about a significant amount of money and other valuable items. Owing to the easy accessibility of arms, armed robbery also occurs.

=== Sex trafficking ===
Cambodian citizens, primarily women and girls, have been sex trafficked within the country and throughout the world. They are threatened and forced into prostitution, marriages, and or pregnancies.

=== Violence against women ===
In 2008, the national survey showed that over one quarter of women in Cambodia suffered from domestic violence. A 2013 UN report showed that 1 in 5 men in Cambodia between the ages of 18 and 49 had admitted that they had raped a woman. 15.8% of those who admitted to having committed a rape had done so when they were younger than 15 years old. “Bauk” is the term used in Cambodia for gang rape. More than double the men in Cambodia admitted to gang rape in comparison to India.

== See also ==
- Drugs in Cambodia
