= Ministry of Interior (Cambodia) =

Government ministry of Cambodia

- ក្រសួងមហាផ្ទៃ

Agency overview
- Jurisdiction: Royal Government of Cambodia
- Headquarters: 275 Norodom Blvd (41), Phnom Penh, Cambodia
- Minister responsible: Sar Sokha, Minister of Interior
- Website: www.interior.gov.kh

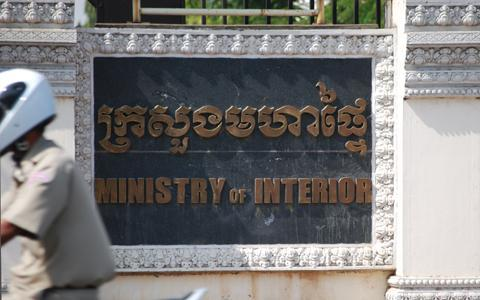
Ministry of Interior in Phnom Penh

The Ministry of the Interior (Khmer: ក្រសួងមហាផ្ទៃ, UNGEGN: Krâsuŏng Môhaphtey) is the interior ministry of the Kingdom of Cambodia. The ministry has a broad mandate and is responsible for public administration throughout Cambodia's 25 capital city-provinces and 203 district/Khan/Municipality. The Ministry governs the Cambodian National Police and the administration of the law enforcement; including the police academy, police training, judicial police, anti-drug efforts, border police and prison administration.

The Ministry liaises with ASEAN law enforcement offices and with Interpol.

The Minister of Interior since 1992 was Deputy Prime Minister Sar Kheng, who assisted by 6 secretaries of state and 4 under-secretaries of state. He was succeeded by his son Sar Sokha in 2023.

== List of ministers ==
No.	Portrait	Name (born–died)	Term of office			Political party	Government	Ref.
No.	Portrait	Name (born–died)	Took office	Left office	Time in office	Political party	Government	Ref.
1		Chea Sim ជា ស៊ីម (1932–2015)	8 January 1979	27 June 1981	2 years, 170 days	KPRP	Pen Sovan	
2		Sar Kheng ស ខេង (b. 1951)	3 February 1992	22 August 2023	31 years, 200 days	CPP	Hun Sen; Norodom Ranariddh; Ung Huot	
3		You Hockry យូ ហុកគ្រី (b. 1944)	24 September 1993	16 July 2004	10 years, 296 days	FUNCINPEC	Hun Sen; Norodom Ranariddh; Ung Huot	
4		Norodom Sirivudh នរោត្តម សិរីវុឌ្ឍ (b. 1951)	16 July 2004	2 March 2006	1 year, 229 days	FUNCINPEC	Hun Sen	
5		Sar Sokha ស សុខា (b. 1981)	22 August 2023	Incumbent	2 years, 351 days	CPP	Hun Manet	

== Organization ==
Head Minister: Deputy Prime Minister Sar Sokha

=== Office of the Minister (the Minister Cabinet) ===
This office is headed by a Secretary of State in charge as the Office Head:

=== General Department Rank ===
The Ministry of Interior consists of 11 general departments. These general departments are headed by General Director Rank:

- Ministry of Interior, General Secretariat.
- Ministry of Interior, General Commissariat of National Police.
- Ministry of Interior, General Department of Administrations.
- Ministry of Interior, General Departments of Inspection.
- Ministry of Interior, General Department of Prison.
- Ministry of Interior, General Department of Immigration.
- Ministry of Interior, General Department of Identification.
- Ministry of Interior, General Department of Logistics and Finance.
- Ministry of Interior, General Department of Internal Audit.
- Ministry of Interior, General Department of Digital Technology and Media.
- Ministry of Interior, Police Academy of Cambodia.
- Ministry of Interior, Legislative Council.

== See also ==
- Government of Cambodia
- Law enforcement in Cambodia
