= Bernard Krisher =

American journalist, publisher and philanthropist

- Born: August 9, 1931; Frankfurt, Germany
- Died: March 5, 2019 (aged 87); Tokyo, Japan
- Education: Columbia University; Harvard University
- Occupations: Journalist, publisher of The Cambodia Daily; founder of World Assistance for Cambodia

Bernard Krisher (née Bernhard Krischer; August 9, 1931 – March 5, 2019) was an American journalist and philanthropist, born in Germany to Polish-Jewish parents.

== Early life ==
Krisher was born in Frankfurt and lived in Leipzig until the age of six. His father Josef Krischer was a furrier in Leipzig and his mother Feige (Fella) Solnitza was a housewife. He and his parents left Germany in 1937 to escape the Nazi Holocaust. They travelled via Paris and Lisbon, eventually settling in New York City in January 1941. At age 12, Krisher published his own magazine and edited his high school and Queens College newspapers. Later he worked for the New York Herald Tribune and the New York World-Telegram & Sun.

After graduating from college, Krisher was drafted into the U.S. Army during the Korean War but due to his German language skills was stationed in Heidelberg at the US Army's press and information division. In 1958 he visited Japan for the first time. From 1959 to 1960 Krisher spent a year doing Japanese area and language studies at Columbia University as a Ford Foundation Advanced International Reporting Fellow.

== Career ==
Krisher joined Newsweek 's Tokyo bureau first as a stringer and eventually became bureau chief until 1980. In 1975 he was the first and only journalist ever do a to a one-on-one interview for publication with the Japanese Emperor Hirohito (Tenno Showa). He was a member of the Council on Foreign Relations.

After retiring from Newsweek, Krisher joined Fortune Magazine as its Tokyo correspondent and at the same time joined Shinchosha, a large Japanese publishing company, as its chief editorial advisor. There he worked on the weekly FOCUS magazine in 1981. Focus magazine reached peak editions of up to 2 million per week in its heyday.

Krisher was the Far East representative of the MIT Media Lab. As such, he collaborated with Nicholas Negroponte, who was also one of the first to sponsor a school in Cambodia in Krisher's signature school building project.

On 5 March 2019, Krisher died at a hospital in Tokyo at the age of 87.

== Philanthropy ==
In 1993, Krisher founded and became chairman of American Assistance for Cambodia, a non-profit organization aimed at giving hope to the Cambodian people following the extermination of 2 million Cambodians during the Khmer Rouge regime.

Cambodia Schools Project, school #363 Oudong, Kampong Speu province

Krisher launched the charity Sihanouk Hospital Center of HOPE which treated the poor for free. By 2013 he'd built over 550 schools, many of them with matching funds from the World Bank and Asian Development Bank. He also founded and published The Cambodia Daily, a newspaper dedicated to setting up a sound foundation for a free press and training journalists. The Cambodia Daily's print publication based out of Phnom Penh was shut down by the Cambodian government in September 2017, but relaunched its operations offshore as an online-only news service in the following month.

== Publications ==
- with Norodom Sihanouk: "Sihanouk Reminisces: World Leaders I Have Known", Editions Duang Kamol; Bangkok, 1990 ISBN 978-9742105235
- Japan as we lived it: can East and West ever meet? Tokyo, Japan : Yohan Publications, 1989
- with Osamu Senna: Intabyū : Tennō kara Fuwa Tetsuzō made (インタビュ一 : 天皇から不破哲三まで /) Tokio, Saimaru Shuppankai (サイマル出版会,) 1976
- with Eiichi Aoki Harvard Conversation - Hābādo no mita Nippon : Nihon wa nyūrīdā ni nareru ka? (ハーバードのみたニッポン : 日本はニューリーダーになれるか?) Tokio, Gurobyūsha (グロビュー社,) 1979

== Honors ==
- Recipient of the Second Iue Asia Pacific Culture Prize 2003
- Healing Cambodia Award, 2011
- Medal of Grand Officier de l'Ordre royal du Cambodge, 2008
