= Law enforcement in Cambodia =

Law enforcement in Cambodia is handled by the Cambodian National Police, one of three General Departments within the Ministry of the Interior. The National Police numbers 64,000 and is divided into four autonomous units and five central departments. The National Police share significant functional overlap with the Military Police (officially the National Gendarmerie), which functions within the Ministry of Defense.

== National police ==
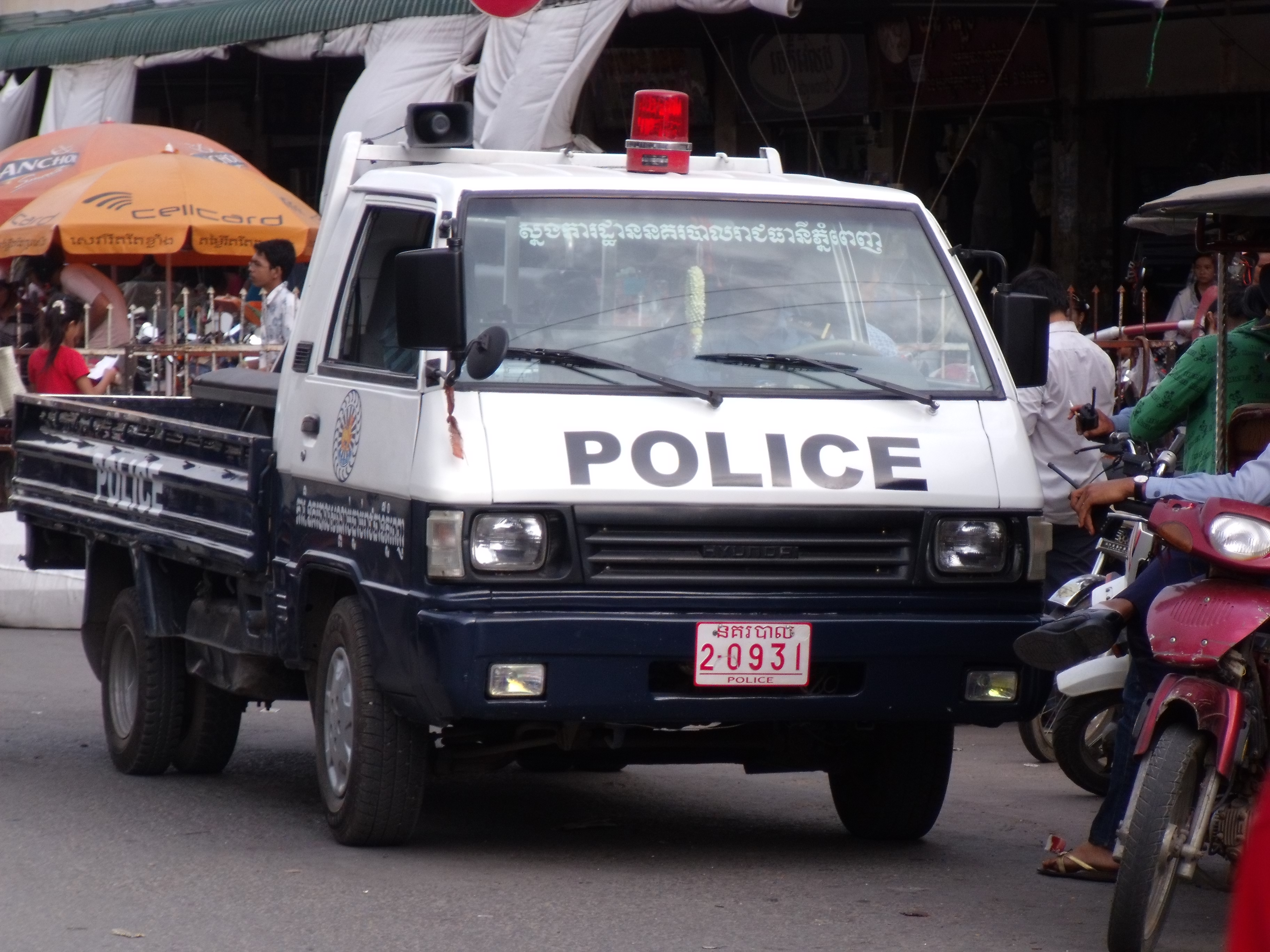
A police vehicle in Phnom Penh.

The General Department of the National Police is one of three general departments within the Ministry of the Interior. The others are the General Inspectorate for Political, Administrative and Police Affairs and the General Department of Administration. The organization traces its origin to the formation of the Royal Khmer Police during the era of the 1st Kingdom of Cambodia.

The ministry is headed by deputy prime minister Sar Kheng and the National Police by a Commissioner-General with the rank of four-star general. (The current Commissioner-General is Neth Savoeun, a nephew by marriage of prime minister Hun Sen).

The Cambodian National Police is divided into four autonomous units, headed collectively by the First Deputy Director of National Police, and five central departments, each managed by a Chief of Department and Deputy Director:

- Four autonomous units:
  - Interpol unit
  - Headquarters unit
  - Intervention unit
  - Drug Enforcement unit
- Five central departments:
  - Department of Border Control
  - Public Order department
  - Department of Justice
  - Security department
  - Central Department of Means (support office)

=== Border department ===
The border police department is divided into three sub-departments:

- Land border
- Marine border
- Logistics and technical

=== Public Order department ===
- Social security
- Defence
- Administration
- Public order

=== Judicial department ===
While the judicial police (the department in charge of most forms of criminal law enforcement) are meant to function under the prosecutor-general's office, they receive orders from the national police commander, meaning prosecutors lack control over the judicial police department. The judicial police force is divided into three sub-departments:

- Criminal police
- Economic police
- Scientific and technical

=== Security department ===
The security police department is divided into four sub-departments:

- General information
- Anti-terrorism police
- Body-guards
- Foreigners

=== Central department of Means ===
- Personnel
- Pedagogy and training
- Logistics and material

== Military police ==
=== Structure ===
The Military Police (Royal Gendarmerie) is a branch of the Royal Cambodian Armed Forces. The Gendarmerie consists of 10 battalion-sized units, each between 500 and 1000 officers. It has a strength of more than 7,000 deployed in all provinces, with headquarters in Phnom Penh. The current commander is Lieutenant-General Sao Sokha, a former bodyguard and personal advisor to prime minister Hun Sen. The Gendarmerie monitors all 25 provinces. The unit includes a mobile team, consisting of six intervention units, an intervention vehicle battalion, a cavalry, and 4 infantry, with bases in Phnom Penh. The Gendarmerie training school is located in Kambol commune, Kandal Province.

=== Duties ===
The Royal Gendarmerie is responsible for the maintenance of public order and internal security, including:

- Restoring peace and stability after a heavy disturbance
- Counter-terrorism
- Countering violent groups
- Suppressing prison riots

Its civil duties include providing security and public peace, investigating and preventing organized crime, terrorism and other violent groups; protecting state and private property; helping and assisting civilians and other emergency forces in a case of emergency, natural disaster, civil unrest and armed conflicts. These functions overlap between the Gendarmerie and the national police.

Its military duties include preserving and protecting national security, state, property, public peace, and public order, and assisting other security forces in case of emergency, civil unrest, war; repressing riots; reinforcing martial law and mobilization; fighting and apprehending suspected criminals, terrorists and other violent groups.

== See also ==
- Hok Lundy
- Crime in Cambodia
