= The Phnom Penh Post =

English-language daily newspaper in Phnom Penh, Cambodia, established 1992

The Phnom Penh Post ភ្នំពេញប៉ុស្តិ៍
- Intelligence, In-depth, Independence

- Front page of The Phnom Penh Post dated 7 May 2018. News about its acquisition by Sivakumar Ganapthy can be seen in the upper-left hand column.
- Type: Online newspaper
- Format: Tabloid (1992–2008); Berliner (2008–2024)
- Owner: Sivakumar Ganapthy
- Founders: Michael Hayes; Kathleen O'Keefe
- Publisher: Bill Clough (2004–18); Ly Tayseng (last)
- Founded: 10 July 1992
- Ceased publication: 29 March 2024
- Political alignment: Centre
- Language: English, Khmer
- Headquarters: Phnom Penh, Cambodia
- City: Phnom Penh
- Country: Cambodia
- OCLC number: 30886151
- Website: phnompenhpost.com

The Phnom Penh Post (Khmer: ភ្នំពេញប៉ុស្តិ៍, Phnum Pénh Pŏsdĕ [pʰnumpeɲ poh]) was a daily English-language newspaper published in Phnom Penh, Cambodia. Founded in 1992 by publisher Michael Hayes and Kathleen O'Keefe, it is Cambodia's oldest English-language newspaper and prior to the transferring of ownership, was considered to be one of Cambodia's newspaper of record. (the other bring The Cambodia Daily) The paper was initially published fortnightly as a full-color tabloid; in 2008 it increased frequency to daily publication and redesigned the format as a Berliner. The Phnom Penh Post is also available in Khmer. It previously published a weekend magazine, 7Days, in its Friday edition. From July 2014, a weekly edition was published on Saturdays called Post Weekend, which was subsequently folded into the paper as a Friday supplement in 2017 and discontinued in 2018.

The newspaper has a staff of Cambodian and foreign journalists covering national news. The newspaper includes specific business, lifestyle and sports sections, and also prints a "Police Blotter", which has items related to crime translated from local Khmer-language dailies.

Since its founding in Phnom Penh in July 1992, the printed edition was published on a fortnightly basis. In early 2008, the newspaper received investment from some Australian investors and became a daily publication on August 8, 2008.

In May 2018 the newspaper was purchased by Malaysian businessman Sivakumar Ganapthy, who also owns a public relations firm known to have worked on behalf of the Cambodian government, prompting several senior writers to leave its newsroom. Describing the sale of the paper, one official for Amnesty International said, "We have witnessed the crumbling of Cambodia's media freedom." In response to criticism of the sale, Huy Vannak, acting as undersecretary of the Cambodian Interior Ministry, said, "It is a normal business, and it remains a newspaper."

In March 2024, the newspaper announced that it would cease its English and Khmer print editions by the end of the month citing a decline in advertising revenue.

== Awards ==
The Phnom Penh Post has received over 30 regional and international press awards between 2008 and 2018.

Society of Publishers in Asia (SOPA)

2012:

- Honorable mention in News Photography to Sovan Philong.

2013:

- World Association of Newspapers, Gold Prize Best Feature. A 68-page supplement celebrating 20 years of the Phnom Penh Post. Editor Alan Parkhouse, contributors included Michael Hayes, Nate Thayer, Luke Hunt, Mark Dodd, Sam Rith, Kay Kimsong, James Ekhardt, Chris Burslim, Robert Carmichael, Tim Page, and John Ogden.

2015:

- Excellence in Lifestyle Coverage for former Post Weekend editor Poppy McPherson's "Reign of the quiet King"
- Excellence in Breaking News for The Post's coverage of the HIV outbreak in Cambodia's Roka village. The Post also received an honorable mention for their coverage of the Veng Sreng Boulevard garment protest at which 5 people were killed.
- Honorable mention for Excellence in Investigative Reporting to May Titthara and Daniel Pye for their detailing of Cambodian logging tycoon Try Pheap's business interests.

2017:

- Excellence in Reporting Women's Issues for a series of articles on Cambodia's surrogacy industry to reporters Cristina Maza, Bun Sengkong, Will Jackson, Vandy Muong and Kong Meta and photographers Eliah Lillis, Charlotte Pert and Athena Zelandonii.
- Honorable mention for breaking news reporting on the assassination of political analyst Kem Ley to reporters Thik Kaliyann, Lay Samean, Mech Dara, Niem Chheng and Shaun Turton; and photographers Athena Zelandonii, Hong Menea and Heng Chivoan.

2018:

- Excellence in Reporting Arts and Culture for "A 'crime' against local history: Cambodia's lost manuscripts" by Alessandro Marazzi Sassoon and Kong Meta, which revealed the destruction of ancient texts to neglect by authorities, the clergy and a black market trade catering to tourists.
- Excellence in Reporting Human Rights for Kong Meta and Andrew Nachemson's report on a previously undocumented village affected by the United States use of chemical weapons during the Vietnam War.
- Honorable mention for breaking news reporting to Ben Sokhean, Mech Dara and Ananth Baliga's same-day coverage of the Supreme Court decision to dissolve the Cambodia National Rescue Party.

== See also ==
- Media of Cambodia
