= The Cambodia Daily =

English and Khmer language newspaper

- All the News Without Fear or Favor
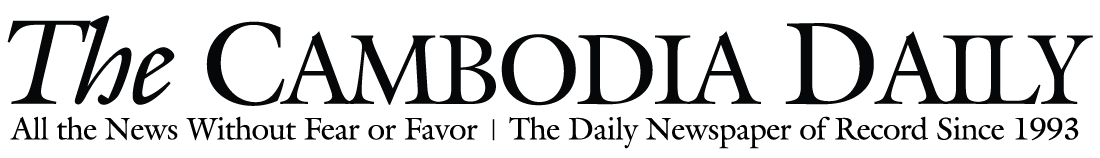
- Founder: Bernard Krisher
- Founded: 1993
- Ceased publication: 4 September 2017 (print)
- Relaunched: October 2017 (digital)
- Language: Khmer, English
- Headquarters: until September 2017 Phnom Penh, Cambodia from October 2018 Washington, D.C.
- Readership: 2 million
- Website: cambodiadaily.com

The Cambodia Daily is a US-based English and Khmer language news site that evolved from a newspaper of the same name that stopped publishing in Cambodia in 2017 due to a tax dispute with the government then led by Hun Sen.

The Cambodia Daily started as an English-language daily newspaper that operated out of Phnom Penh, Cambodia from 1993 to 2017, and was considered a newspaper of record for Cambodia.

The 2017 closure was the result of a dispute with the Cambodian government over a US$6.3 million tax bill, which the newspaper disputed as politically motivated. The newspaper ceased its daily print newspaper, but still maintains an online presence.

In 2017, the Cambodian government ordered Internet service providers (ISPs) to block The Cambodia Daily's website from within Cambodia.

== History ==
The Cambodia Daily was started in 1993 by Bernard Krisher, an American journalist and philanthropist. Krisher's aim for the paper, as outlined in an article in its first issue, was twofold: to create an independent newspaper of record and to train Cambodian journalists. The newspaper's motto was "All the news without fear or favor".

Krisher hired two young and relatively inexperienced journalists, Barton Biggs and Robin McDowell, as the paper's first editors. The first issue was published on August 20, 1993, and the last print issue was published on September 4, 2017. It relaunched as an online-only news site in October 2017. At the time it started publication, The Cambodia Daily was Cambodia's only English-language daily newspaper. The Phnom Penh Post, which had been in print since 1992, was only printed fortnightly until it began daily publication in early 2008. James Kanter served as editor in chief from 1995 to 1997.

== Content ==
The print edition of The Cambodia Daily was published in Phnom Penh in an A4-size format and was delivered six days a week, Monday to Saturday, until 2017, when it reduced its print run to five days per week. The paper featured four to ten pages of local news daily written by its Cambodian and foreign reporters. Its regional and international news sections consisted of copy donated and purchased from major news outlets and wire services (e.g. Reuters, The Washington Post, New York Times, Asahi, Kyodo News). The weekend edition of the paper was accompanied by a full-color Weekend magazine insert that included local and international feature pieces. A daily section in Khmer language carried articles translated from the main English-language section, and the Monday issue of the paper included "English Weekly", a special insert with news quizzes for English learners.

=== Notable stories ===
The Cambodia Daily covered local news and included investigative reporting on illegal logging and its coverage of corruption and human rights abuses, including land grabs and forced evictions.

==== Award-winning reporting ====
In 2017, the paper's journalists Aun Pheap and Zsombor Peter won an Excellence in Investigative Reporting from the Society of Publishers in Asia (SOPA) for their article "Still Taking a Cut," which exposed the involvement of the Cambodian military in the country's illegal logging trade. In 2016, journalists won a SOPA Excellence in Feature Writing award for their article, "Moving Dirt: A lucrative dirt trade is leaving holes in communities".

==== Somaly Mam investigation ====
The Cambodia Daily led a years-long investigation into famed anti-trafficking activist Somaly Mam, former president of the Somaly Mam Foundation, over discrepancies in her autobiography, The Road of Lost Innocence, which detailed her backstory as a sex slave in Cambodia, becoming an international bestseller. The newspaper first began reporting on inconsistencies in her public comments and claims made in her book in early-2012, and in October 2013 published results of its investigation into claims of trafficking made in Mam's book that reporters found to have been fabricated. A May 2014 Newsweek exposé by Simon Marks, a former editor of The Cambodia Daily, focused international attention on the alleged falsifications, and Mam stepped down from her foundation just days after the article's publication.

The New York Times credited The Cambodia Daily with first pointing out that Somaly Mam's stories of her childhood were false in 2012 and 2013.

== Print closure ==
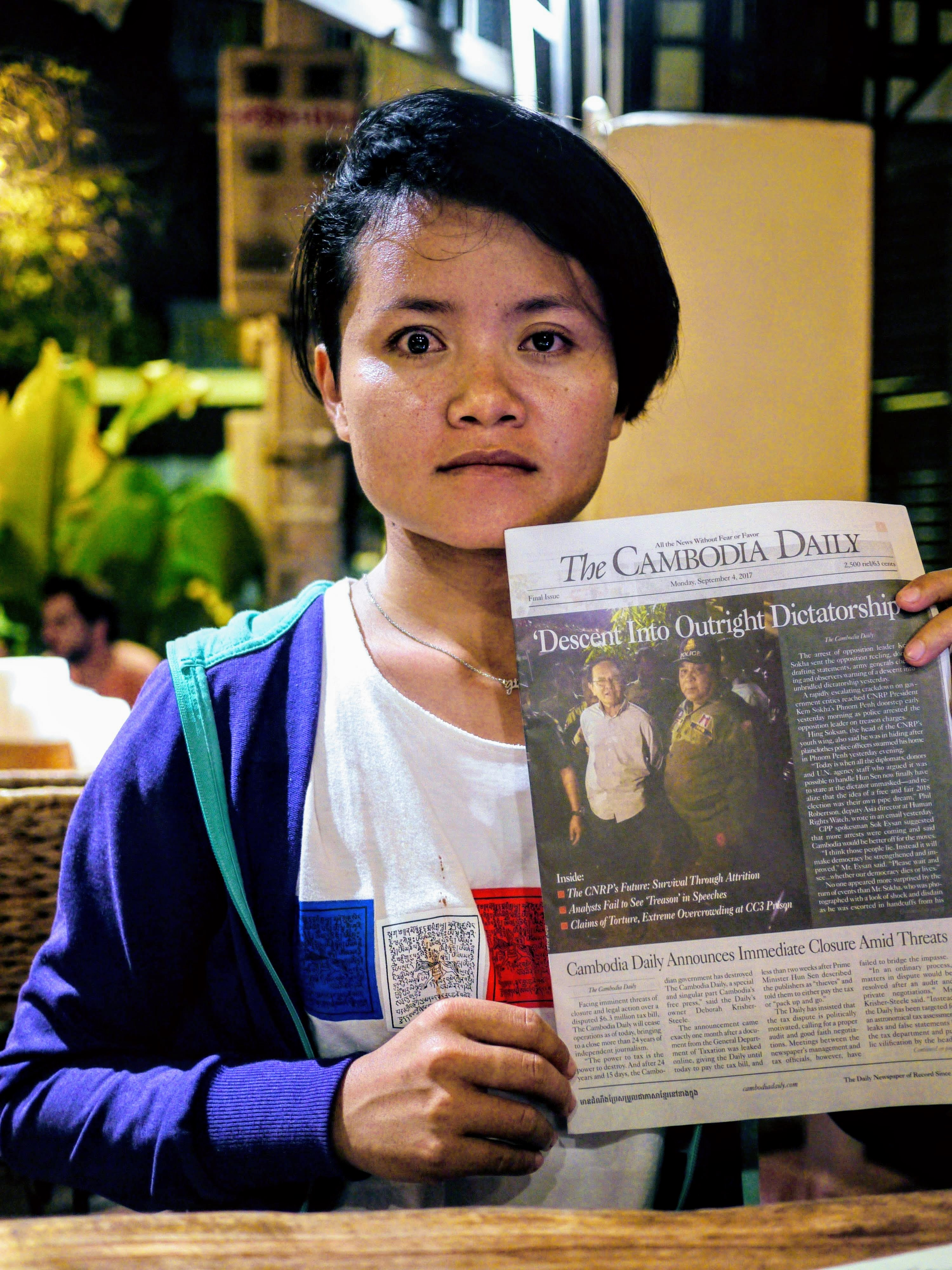
A photograph of a former Daily reporter holding up a copy of the final issue of the newspaper in September 2017

The Cambodia Daily published its final issue on September 4, 2017, announcing its immediate closure. According to the owners, the closure was the result of a dispute with the Cambodian government over an arbitrary US$6.3 million tax bill, which was disputed by the newspaper. The newspaper had changed itself from a non-profit organization to a for-profit organization, therefore the royal government stated that taxes were due back to 1993. The Cambodian Department of Taxation disputed the accusation of political motivation, and commented that the tax bill was aimed at supporting the national budget. The Cambodian government had started a tax reform initiative in 2013 to increase the government’s tax revenue collection capabilities and better regulate Cambodia’s significant informal economy.

The paper's final front page featured the headline "Descent into Outright Dictatorship" above its top article on the arrest of Cambodian National Rescue Party President Kem Sokha, and was published amid a "deteriorating" political climate in Cambodia, according to the UN Human Rights Office.

The journalist community and Cambodian civil society showed their support for the paper with the social media movement #SaveTheDaily, and its closure received international coverage, including in The New York Times, The Guardian, The Washington Post and Al Jazeera.

Within six weeks of the paper's closure, a news digest appeared on its website signaling an attempt to relaunch the closed paper as an online-only news service from outside Cambodia. On February 4, 2018, the Phnom Penh Post reported that the Cambodian Telecoms Ministry Secretary of State Khay Khunheng had ordered all Cambodian ISPs "to block the [Cambodia Daily's] webpage... and guarantee that this webpage and IP address will no longer be operating in the Kingdom of the Cambodia”. The letter also requested to block access to The Cambodia Daily’s Facebook and Twitter accounts.

== Relaunch ==
In October 2017, after the closure of the newspaper operations in Cambodia, The Cambodia Daily moved its headquarters to Washington D.C. and relaunched as a digital-only news service. The media outlet expanded its reach through an array of multimedia channels, including its website, Facebook, YouTube, Telegram, Spotify, Google Podcast, Apple Podcast, Instagram, and X (formerly Twitter). 90% of the content is delivered in the Khmer language and 10% in English. As of 2023, The Cambodia Daily consistently reaches nearly two million viewers and listeners throughout Cambodia.

== Threats to chief correspondent ==
In June 2023, Sarada Taing, the chief correspondent for The Cambodia Daily, faced threats due to his journalism. Residing in Washington, D.C., Taing was the target of threats, including those from Pheng Vannak, a pro-government figure in Cambodia. These threats intensified following Taing's reporting on Cambodian governmental corruption and human rights issues.

== Notable staff ==
- Molly Ball
- Thomas Beller
- Robert Bingham
- Bernard Krisher
- Kelly McEvers
- Graeme Wood

== See also ==
- Media of Cambodia
