= List of newspapers in Cambodia =

Below is a list of newspapers published in Cambodia.

== Newspapers ==
- CambodgeMag (French)
- The Cambodia Daily (English)
- The Cambodia China Times (Chinese and Khmer)
- The Commercial News (Chinese)
- Khmer Times (English)
- Koh Santepheap Daily (Khmer), founded in 1967
- Moneaksekar Khmer (Khmer)
- The Nation Post (Khmer)
- The Phnom Penh Post (English)
- The Phnom Penh WEEK (English)
- Rasmei Kampuchea Daily (Khmer)
- Sneha Cheat (Khmer)
- The Southeast Asia Weekly (English)
- Sralanh Khmer (Khmer)
- Thngay Pram Py Makara News
- The Voice of Khmer Youth (Khmer)
- ThmeyThmey (Khmer)/Cambodianess (English)

== See also ==
- Mass media in Cambodia
