= Mass media in Cambodia =

Media in Cambodia is largely unregulated and includes radio, television and print media outlets. Private sector companies have moved into the media sector, which represents a change from years of state-run broadcasting and publishing.

Since emerging from the communist governments of the Khmer Rouge and the Vietnam-backed People's Republic of Kampuchea regime, the Cambodian media sector has become one of Southeast Asia's most free. However, the lack of professional journalism training and ethics along with the intimidation by both government and private interests limit the Cambodian media's influence.

== History ==
In 1987, the state controlled print and electronic media and regulated their content. The most authoritative print medium in 1987 was the ruling KPRP's biweekly journal, Pracheachon (The People), which was inaugurated in October 1985 to express the party's stand on domestic and international affairs. Almost as important, however, was the weekly of the KUFNCD, Kampuchea. The principal publication of the armed forces was the weekly Kangtoap Padevoat (Revolutionary Army). As of 1987, Cambodia still had no daily newspaper. Though this situation changed swiftly after the withdrawal of Vietnamese troops and the UNTAC supervised general election in 1993.

Radio and television were under the direction of the Kampuchean Radio and Television Commission, created in 1983. In 1986 there were about 200,000 radio receivers in the country. The Voice of the Kampuchean People (VOKP) radio programs were broadcast in Khmer, Vietnamese, French, English, Lao, and Thai. With Vietnamese assistance, television broadcasting was instituted on a trial basis in December 1983 and then regularly at the end of 1984.

As of March 1986, Television Kampuchea (TVK) operated two hours an evening, four days a week in the Phnom Penh area only. There were an estimated 52,000 television sets as of early 1986. In December 1986, Vietnam agreed to train Cambodian television technicians. The following month, the Soviet Union agreed to cooperate with Phnom Penh in the development of electronic media. Cambodian viewers began to receive Soviet television programs after March 1987, through a satellite ground station that the Soviet Union had built in Phnom Penh.

Beginning in 1979, the Heng Samrin regime encouraged people to read official journals and to listen to the radio every day. Widespread illiteracy and a scarcity of both print media and radio receivers, however, meant that few Cambodians could follow the government's suggestion. But even when these media were available, "cadres and combatants" in the armed forces, for example, were more interested in listening to music programs than in reading about "the situation and developments in the country and the world or articles on good models of good people."

== Television ==
Cambodia launched regular television broadcasts in 1961 with the help of Japanese aid, after brief technical disruptions in 1966 another station was created, its call sign was XUTV. The station was part of the state-owned Télévision royale khmère, operating 12 to 14 hours daily, with advertising as its primary source of income. Its studios were destroyed by the Khmer Rouge in 1975, halting the role of television during the Khmer Rouge era.

In 1983, the government launched another station, TVK, under the Vietnamese-backed People's Republic of Kampuchea regime. It began broadcasting in color in 1986, thus becoming the last sovereign country in the world to start color broadcasting. There was only one station until 1993, when private companies began to launch their own stations, the first being TV9 and TV5.

All of these stations have local programming, including serials, variety shows and game shows. Thai soap operas (dubbed in Khmer) were extremely popular, until a backlash following the 2003 Phnom Penh riots, after which Thai programs were banned.

Cable television, including UBC programming from Thailand as well as other satellite networks, is also widely available in Cambodia. Many people in Cambodia do not watch Cambodia-produced television, instead applying for UBC from Thailand to view Thai programs. Cambodians living abroad can watch Khmer television content via Thaicom from Thailand, Myanmar, and Vietnam.

Most television networks in Cambodia shut down in the evening. Since 2008, the government has allowed TV channels to close at 12.00 a.m. (midnight) and resume at 6.00 a.m..

== Audience measurement ==
There is no official standard for media measurement used by the industry, despite self-promotional claims by certain companies.

=== List of terrestrial television stations ===
There are 11 TV stations nationwide, including two relay stations with French, Thai and Vietnamese broadcasts, as well as 12 regional low-power stations (as of 2006). They include:

==== Terrestrial ====
There are fifteen terrestrial television stations in Cambodia

- Town Full HDTV, launched in 2017 - Broadcasts 24 hours a day.
- PNN TV, launched in 2015 with the largest studio in the country and nationwide broadcast coverage.
- CTV 8 HD (UHF 48) - The First Entertainment Channel providing HD quality program in Cambodia and available nationwide.
- TV3
- MNBT Television
- Apsara Television (TV11) - Broadcasts each day from 4:30am to 10:00pm.
- Bayon Television (Channel 27) - Cambodia's only UHF channel. Based in Kandal Province.
- Cambodian Television Network (CTN); formerly Television Cambodia Network (TCN)
- MyTV, a TV channel that targets Cambodian teens and youth, also owned by CTN
- Khmer Television (CTV9)
- National Television of Cambodia (TVK)
- Royal Cambodian Armed Forces Television (TV5) - Broadcasts 17.5 hours from 6.00 a.m. to 11.30 p.m.
- SEATV (Southeast Asia Television)
- Hang Meas HDTV - Broadcasts 24 hours a day.
- Raksmey Hang Meas HDTV
- ETV
- CNC
- Bayon News TV

There are also regional relay stations for various channels in Mondulkiri, Preah Vihear, Ratanakiri, Siem Reap and Sihanoukville. TVK has the local stations with 2 hours of local programming, from 19:30 to 21:30.

=== Cable television providers ===
- DTV STAR Co., Ltd (TV, Internet, IP Phone)
- Cambodian Cable Television (CCTV)

Since 2009 the film industry has grown by a 26% rate attracting film companies and directors to film overseas in Cambodia. The M family have slowly been moving in to monopolies the media market.

- Phnom Penh Cable Television (PPCTV),
- OneTV is the first digital terrestrial TV operator (joint venture between Cambodia's Royal Group of Companies and Russia's General Satellite)

=== Cambodian television in the future ===
In 2015, Cambodian television is scheduled to switched to Digital Video Broadcasting (Terrestrial) DVB-T at the recommendation of ASEAN. Currently, only PPCTV provided the First DVB-T services in Cambodia which began offering services in May 2011, is offering DVB-T broadcasting in Cambodia. There are also a couple of entrepreneurs who have plans of bringing more to the television networks associated with MNBT and CTOWN daily.

Since 2013 Kantar Media has conducted television measurement, however it is not an officially recognized standard in Cambodia.

== Digital media publishing ==
S A B A Y is a Cambodian Internet media company based in Phnom Penh. The firm is a social news and entertainment company with a focus on digital media. Sabay was founded in 2007, originally known for IT company and online game publisher, the company has grown into a News media and technology company providing coverage on a variety of topics including Entertainment, Social, Sport, DIY, Women, Food, Social and Magazine.

== Radio ==
Cambodia has two AM stations and at least 65 FM stations

=== List of radio stations ===
- Lotus FM Radio 100.5
- Tonle FM Phnom Penh FM 102.5
- Tonle FM Siem Reap FM 102.5
- Tonle F Kampong Cham FM 102.5
- VAYO FM Phnom Penh FM 105.5
- VAYO FM Siem Reap FM 88
- VAYO FM Battambang FM 88
- VAYO FM Sihanoukville FM 102.5
- VIBE Radio 94.5
- Voice of Youth FM91.5 launched in April 2014 covering Phnom Penh, nearby provinces and soon nationwide.
- TOWN Radio FM 102.25 MHz
- TOWN Radio FM 95.7 MHz Battambang
- TOWN Radio FM 90.7 MHz Siem Reap
- TOP Radio FM 92.3 MHz Entertainment Radio
- Phnom Penh Radio FM 103 MHz
- Dance FM Phnom Penh's number 1# station
- NRG 89 fm. Phnom Penh's 1st dedicated music station, broadcasting 24hours a day.
- Radio Love FM 97.5 MHz - Cambodia's local western pop music radio station.
- Radio Australia 101.5 FM Phnom Penh & Siem Reap available 24 hours a day
- BBC World Service Radio FM 100. Broadcasting 24 hours a day. Available in and around Phnom Penh (2007).
- Apsara Radio FM 97 MHz
- Family FM 99.5;MHz
- National Radio of Cambodia (RNK) AM 918 kHz and FM 105.7 MHz
- Radio Beehive FM 105 MHz
- Radio FM 90 MHz
- Radio FM 99 MHz
- Radio Khmer FM 107 MHz
- Radio Sweet FM 88 MHz
- Royal Cambodia Armed Forces Radio FM 98 MHz (Green Wave 98)
- Women's Radio FM 103.5 MHz of Women's Media Centre of Cambodia- Using media to promote social change in Cambodian society.
- Sarika FM 106.5 MHz
- Radio Hang Meas FM 104.5 MHz
- Radio Raksmey Hang Meas FM 95.7 MHz

== Newspapers ==
There are more than 100 newspapers in Cambodia, however few maintain regular publication schedules and have paid staff. Many newspapers are run by political parties or individual politicians, so coverage is often slanted. Reporters will sometimes demand payments from their sources to keep unfavorable stories, whether true or not, out of the paper.

However, reporters for the established vernacular dailies and journalists working for wire services and the foreign-language press, generally keep to a standard of ethics.

=== List of newspapers ===
==== National mass-circulation dailies ====
- La Reine Peanich
- Chakraval Daily
- The Cambodian Journal
- Kampuchea Thmei Daily
- Kampuchea Thnai Nes (Cambodia Today)
- Kanychok Sangkhum
- Koh Santepheap (Island of Peace)
- Khmerfeed (Khmerfeed Digital
- Moneaksekar Khmer (Khmer Conscience) - Published by the Sam Rainsy Party.
- Rasmei Kampuchea (Light of Kampuchea) - Cambodia's largest daily, it circulates about 18,000 copies.
- Samleng Yuvachun (Voice of Khmer Youth)
- Udomkate Khmer (Khmer Ideal)
- Wat Phnom Daily
- "The Messenger" ("អ្នកនាំសារ") Published by the Catholic Social Communications National Office

==== English-language newspapers ====
- Business News
- CTown daily - Entertainment magazine.
- The Cambodian Journal
- The Mekong Times - English (week) daily paper with Khmer translations. Publication of this paper has ceased temporarily, as advised by email to its subscribers on 19 August 2008.
- The Mirror - Published by Open Forum of Cambodia, this is a weekly English-language overview of the Khmer-language press. Also publishes a weekly Khmer summary called Kanychok Sangkhum.
- Phnom Penh Post - Cambodia's oldest English-language paper. Originally fortnightly, it is now daily.
- Khmer Times-English-language newspaper following Cambodian national news, business, and entertainment. First launched in April 2014.
- The Cambodia Daily- Ceased print publication in 2017 after Cambodian government crackdown on all independent media. Transitioned to digital-only publication in 2018.

=== English-language magazines ===
- Health Time Magazine - The Only Health Magazine in Cambodia.
- Cambodia Tourism Magazine (CTM) - The only one bi-monthly tourism magazine in both English and Khmer language provides abundant of tourism information, local destination, art and culture, foods and restaurants, accommodations, and other related sectors.
- Cambodia CityLife Magazine - A Bi-monthly publication is Cambodia's premier guide magazine bring good reading to all those in Phnom Penh and around town.
- Lady Penh - handy weekly event guide for Phnom Penh (December 201). High circulation.
- Bayon Pearnik - Mixes humor and satire about current affairs in Cambodia with critical commentary and adventure-travel information.
- Visitors Guide - Publishes separate guides for Phnom Penh, Siem Reap and Sihanoukville.
- Cambodia Pocket Guide - a series of pocket-sized tourist guides that includes articles relating to travel, entertainment, nightlife and so forth.
- DISCOVER CAMBODIA - An annual premium travel and leisure magazine
- AsiaLIFE Guide Phnom Penh - A monthly lifestyle magazine for Phnom Penh and regional Cambodia with sections on food, drink, the arts, travel, shopping, leisure and business.
- Economics Today - Closed
- Coastal - a free 6-monthly publication with tourist information about Cambodia's coastal tourist towns.
- Sports Express is Cambodia's first English Language sports magazine featuring both Cambodian and International sports news, including the Cambodian Basketball League and the Metfone C-League.
- Cambodia Golf Today - Cambodia`s leading golf magazine in dual-language(Eng-Khmer) founded in 2014 covering golf news and reviews on a quarterly basis to promote golf in Cambodia
- THEMAN Magazine- is Cambodia's only men’s Fashion English language magazine.

==== French-language newspapers ====
- Cambodge Nouveau
- Cambodge Soir - Closed
- L´Écho du Cambodge - Closed

Cambodge Mag by Christophe Gargiulo

==== Chinese-language newspapers ====
- Cambodia Sin Chew Daily (Malaysia)
- Jian Hua Daily
- The Commercial News
- Angkor time

==== Online news ====
- The Cambodia Daily - Formerly print publication founded in 1993. Shifted exclusively to an online platform in September 2017.
- CamboJA News - Independent network of professional journalists in Cambodia formed by Cambodian journalists, including former reporters of the Cambodia Daily and Phnom Penh Post.
- Kampucheathmey
- Thmey Thmey
- Post Khmer
- Khmerload'
- AEC News Today
- TNAOT
- Voice of Democracy (VOD)
- Bakong Media
- The Cambodian Journal
- Omnung: Khmer News Portal
- Khmerfeed
- Siemreap.net
- VEHA Media
- CEN: Cambodia Express News
- Merl Komsan - Online media site & Media Agency in Cambodia.
- Cambodianess - English news site affiliated with Thmeythmey.com.
- Fresh News - founded in May 2012.
- Kiripost is a digital media company covering Cambodia’s startups and businesses.
- Cambodia Express News
- Cambonomist
- The Cambodia China Times

== See also ==
- Communications in Cambodia
- Agence Khmer Presse
- Cinema of Cambodia
- Ministry of Culture and Fine Arts, Cambodia
