= Organisation internationale de la Francophonie =

International organization

Coordinates: 48°51′36″N 2°18′12″E

- Flag Logo
- Motto "Égalité, complémentarité, solidarité" "Equality, complementarity, solidarity"
- National members Regional members Associated members Suspended members Observers
- Headquarters: Paris, France
- Membership: 56 full members: Albania; Andorra; Armenia; Belgium ∟ French Community of Belgium (Note: Belgian linguistic community); Benin; Bulgaria; Burkina Faso (suspended); Burundi; Cambodia; Cameroon; Canada ∟ New Brunswick (Note: Canadian province) ∟ Quebec; Cape Verde; Central African Republic; Chad; Comoros; Cyprus; Congo; DR Congo; Djibouti; Dominica; Equatorial Guinea; Egypt; France; Gabon; Ghana; Greece; Guinea; Guinea-Bissau; Haiti; Ivory Coast; Laos; Lebanon; Luxembourg; Madagascar; Mali (suspended); Mauritania; Mauritius; Moldova; Monaco; Morocco; North Macedonia; Niger (suspended); Romania; Rwanda; Saint Lucia; São Tomé and Príncipe; Senegal; Seychelles; Switzerland; Togo; Tunisia; Vanuatu; Vietnam

Leaders
  - Secretary-General: Louise Mushikiwabo
  - APF General Secretary: Jacques Krabal
  - APF President: Nathalie Roy

Establishment
  - Conference of Niamey: 20 March 1970 (as ACCT)
  - Conference of Hanoi: 14–16 November 1997 (as La Francophonie)

Area
  - Total: 28,223,185 km^{2} (10,897,033 sq mi)

Population
  - 2016 estimate: 1 billion
  - Density: 36/km^{2} (93.2/sq mi)
- GDP (nominal): 2023 estimate
  - Total: ▲$18.28 trillion
- Website www.francophonie.org
- 1. Deliberately alluding to France's motto.

The Organisation internationale de la Francophonie (OIF; French for "International Organisation of the Francophonie"; sometimes shortened to La Francophonie, French: La Francophonie [la fʁɑ̃kɔfɔni], (Note: Francophonie is the name of the "French-speaking world".) sometimes also called International Organisation of La Francophonie in English) is an international organization representing states and governments with a notable affiliation with French language and culture.

The organization comprises 93 member states and governments; of these, 56 states and governments are full members, 5 are associate members and 32 are observers. The term francophonie (with a lowercase "f"), or francosphere (often capitalized in English), also refers to the global community of French-speaking peoples, comprising a network of private and public organizations promoting equal ties among countries where the French language or culture plays a significant historical role, culturally, militarily, or politically.

The organization was created in 1970. Most of its founding members and current full members were part of the French colonial empire. Its headquarters is located on Avenue Bosquet in Paris, France. Its motto is égalité, complémentarité, solidarité ("equality, complementarity, and solidarity"), a deliberate allusion to France's motto liberté, égalité, fraternité. Starting as a small group of French-speaking countries, the Francophonie has since evolved into a global organization whose numerous branches cooperate with its member states in the fields of culture, science, economy, justice, and peace. Its mission is to promote the French language and cultural and linguistic diversity, promote peace, democracy, and human rights, and support education, research, and cooperative development. It is an observer of the United Nations (UN).

== History ==
The Organisation internationale de la Francophonie traces its origins to the establishment of the Agence de coopération culturelle et technique (ACCT) in Niamey, Niger, on 20 March 1970. The agreement establishing the agency was signed by representatives of 21 states and governments. Its creation was promoted by several leaders of newly independent countries, notably Léopold Sédar Senghor of Senegal, Habib Bourguiba of Tunisia, Hamani Diori of Niger and Norodom Sihanouk of Cambodia. The agency was established to promote cooperation among French-speaking countries in education, culture, science and technology.

The organization gradually expanded its activities beyond cultural and technical cooperation to include economic development, democracy, human rights and conflict prevention. The first Francophonie Summit was held in Versailles, France, in February 1986, bringing together heads of state and government from French-speaking countries. The summits subsequently became the principal forum for setting the organization's political priorities.

In 1989, Canadian diplomat Jean-Louis Roy became secretary-general of the ACCT, a position he held until 1997. At the seventh Francophonie Summit, held in Hanoi in November 1997, the organization adopted a revised institutional structure and created the position of Secretary-General of La Francophonie. Former Secretary-General of the United Nations Boutros Boutros-Ghali was appointed its first holder. The ACCT was renamed the Intergovernmental Agency of the Francophonie (Agence intergouvernementale de la Francophonie).

At the 2002 summit in Beirut, former Senegalese president Abdou Diouf was chosen to succeed Boutros-Ghali as Secretary-General. He took office on 1 January 2003 and was subsequently re-elected in 2006 and 2010. A new Charter of the Francophonie, adopted in Antananarivo, Madagascar, in November 2005, established the organization's present name, the Organisation internationale de la Francophonie (OIF), and defined its institutional structure.

At the 2014 summit in Dakar, former Canadian governor general Michaëlle Jean was elected Secretary-General, becoming the first woman to lead the organization. She was succeeded in January 2019 by Louise Mushikiwabo, a former foreign minister of Rwanda, who was elected at the 2018 summit in Yerevan, Armenia. Mushikiwabo's election was supported by French President Emmanuel Macron but attracted criticism over Rwanda's human rights record.

During the 2020s, the organization faced tensions over its membership and political role. Following military coups and disputes over the suspension of their membership, Niger, Mali and Burkina Faso announced their withdrawal from the OIF in March 2025. The three governments accused the organization of applying sanctions selectively.

At the 20th Francophonie Summit, held in Phnom Penh, Cambodia, in November 2026, a dispute arose over Mushikiwabo's bid for a third term as Secretary-General. The Democratic Republic of the Congo opposed her re-election because of Rwanda's involvement in the conflict in eastern Congo and threatened to withdraw from the organization if she remained in office for another four-year term. Congo initially proposed its own candidate before supporting former Romanian prime minister Dacian Cioloș. After negotiations failed to produce agreement on a successor, members reached a compromise extending Mushikiwabo's term by one year, with a new election to be held in 2027. Rwanda agreed not to seek the position in that election.

The Phnom Penh summit also admitted Saint Kitts and Nevis and the Canadian province of Manitoba as observers and confirmed that the next summit would take place in Ottawa, Canada, in 2028.

== Structure ==
=== Executive Secretariat (Secretaries-General) ===
The position of Secretary-General was created in 1997 at the seventh leaders' summit held in Hanoi. Canadian Jean-Louis Roy was secretary of the Agence de coopération culturelle et technique from 1989 until the formal creation of the Agence intergouvernementale de la Francophonie in 1997 with former Secretary-General of the United Nations Boutros Boutros-Ghali as the first secretary-general of La Francophonie. Abdou Diouf, the former president of the Republic of Senegal, became Secretary General on 1 January 2003. He was re-elected on 29 September 2006 for a second mandate during the Summit of the Francophonie in Bucharest, and elected again in 2010 at the Summit of the Francophonie in Montreux for another mandate, which ran until 31 December 2014. At the 2014 summit in Dakar, former Governor General of Canada Michaëlle Jean was chosen to lead the organization starting in January 2015.

The Secretary General of the Francophonie is elected at the Summit and serves as the spokesperson and the official international representative of the Francophonie's political actions. The Secretary General is responsible for proposing priority areas for multilateral Francophonie actions. Their job is to facilitate Francophone multilateral cooperation and to ensure that programs and activities of all operating agencies work in harmony. The Secretary General carries out their four-year mandate under the authority of the three leading institutions of the Francophonie: the Summits, the Ministerial Conference and the Permanent Council.

Jean was succeeded by Louise Mushikiwabo, a former foreign minister of Rwanda, who was elected at the 2018 summit in Yerevan, Armenia. Mushikiwabo took office in January 2019 and was re-elected to a second four-year term at the 2022 summit in Djerba, Tunisia.

At the 2006 summit in Phnom Penh, Cambodia, member states failed to agree on the election of a Secretary-General amid tensions between Rwanda and the Democratic Republic of the Congo, which opposed Mushikiwabo's bid for a third term. On 16 November 2026, delegates voted to postpone the election for one year and retain Mushikiwabo in office during the interim period. An extraordinary summit was planned to elect a successor following a review of the organization's electoral procedures.

The Secretary-General is elected by the heads of state and government at the Francophonie Summit for a renewable four-year term. The officeholder directs the Organisation internationale de la Francophonie, serves as its legal representative and coordinates its multilateral activities. The Secretary-General also chairs the Permanent Council of the Francophonie and participates in the Ministerial Conference of the Francophonie.

No.	Image	Name	Country	Birth	Death	Start	End	Notes
1		Boutros Boutros-Ghali	Egypt	14 November 1922	16 March 2016 (aged 93)	16 November 1997	31 December 2002	Secretary-General of the United Nations (1992–1996), Minister of Foreign Affairs of Egypt (1977, 1978–1979), Minister of State for Foreign Affairs of Egypt (1977–1991)
2		Abdou Diouf	Senegal	7 September 1935 (age 91)	Living	1 January 2003	31 December 2014	President of Senegal (1981–2000), Prime Minister of Senegal (1970–1980)
3		Michaëlle Jean	Canada	6 September 1957 (age 69)	Living	5 January 2015	2 January 2019	Governor General of Canada (2005–2010)
4		Louise Mushikiwabo	Rwanda	2 May 1961 (age 65)	Living	3 January 2019	incumbent	Minister of Foreign Affairs and Cooperation of Rwanda (2009–2018)

=== Summits ===
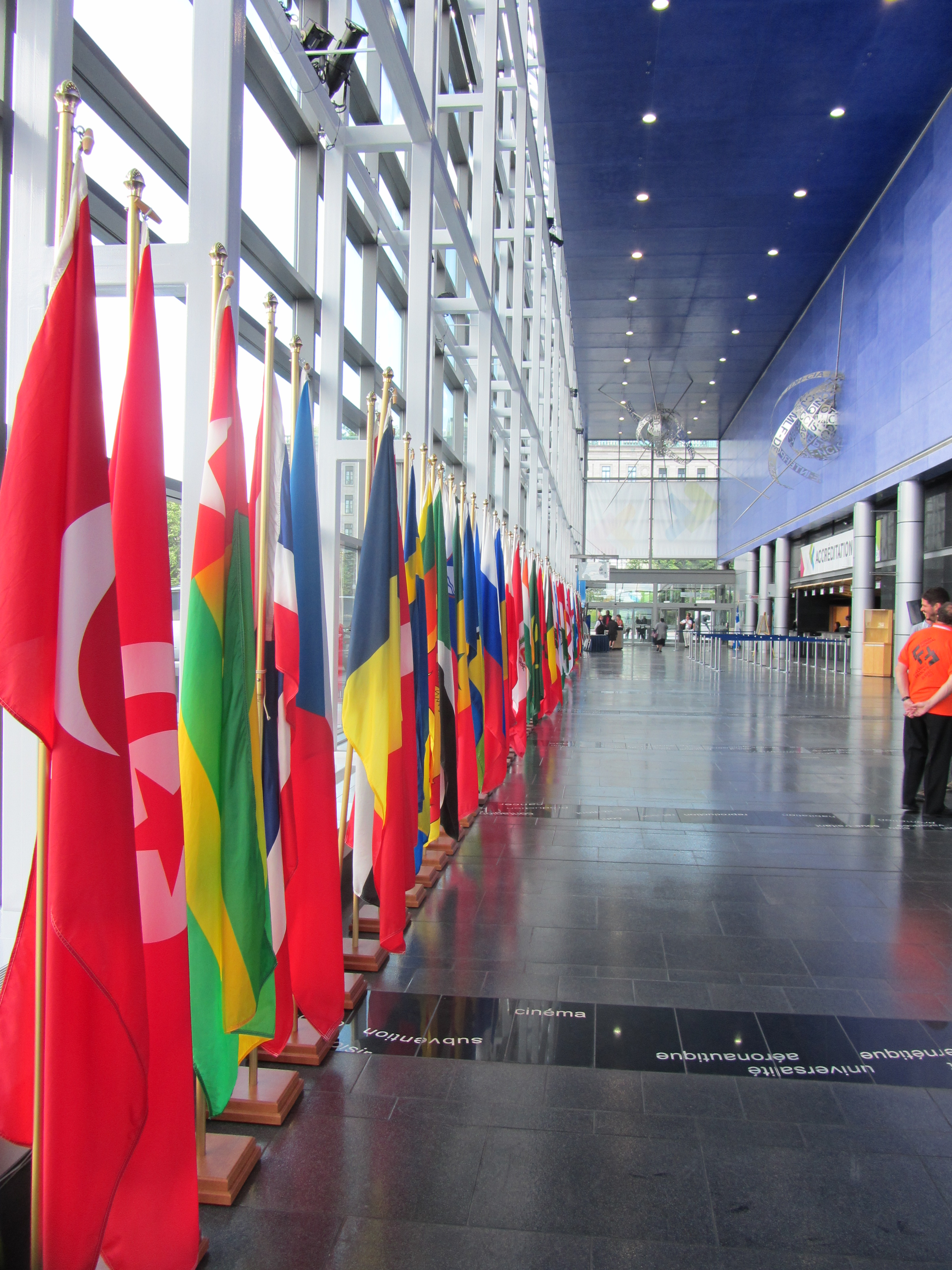
Flags of the Francophonie members

The Summit, the highest authority in the Francophonie, is held every two years and gathers the heads of states and governments of all member states of the OIF around certain themes of discussion. It is chaired by the head of state or government of the host country and this person assumes that responsibility until the next summit. By enabling heads of state and government to engage in dialogue on all international issues of the day, the summit helps develop the Francophonie's strategies and goals to ensure the organization's influence on the world stage.

No.	Country/Region	City	Dates	Host
I	France	Versailles	17–19 February 1986	President François Mitterrand
I	41 countries and governments were represented. The conference was an effort to establish ongoing consultations on major issues of the day. It affirmed the role of the French language as a modern tool for progress and intercultural dialogue and sought to convey Francophone solidarity through concrete programs with broad appeal.			
II	Quebec, Canada	Quebec City	2–4 September 1987	Prime Minister Brian Mulroney
II	Established areas of cooperation and the strengthening of solidarity among the countries and governments that participated in the Paris Summit. La Francophonie's priority areas were confirmed as agriculture, energy, scientific and technological development, language, communication and culture. The Institute of Energy and Environment of La Francophonie, based in Quebec City, and the Francophone Business Forum, a non-governmental organization of French-speaking business people, were created.			
III	Senegal	Dakar	24–26 May 1989	President Abdou Diouf
III	Meeting agreed to initiatives in education and training, the environment, and legal and judicial cooperation and confirmed the role of the Agence de Coopération Culturelle et Technique as the principal operating agency and the key instrument of La Francophonie as a multilateral organization. During the summit, French President François Mitterrand announced the cancellation of the debt of thirty-five African countries to France. The establishment of Senghor University in Alexandria, Egypt, was also agreed to.			
IV	France	Paris	19–21 November 1991	President François Mitterrand
IV	Nearly 50 countries and governments from all five continents attended. The Ministerial Conference of La Francophonie and the Permanent Council of La Francophonie were created, and the role of the ACCT as the secretariat of all of the organization's institutions was confirmed.			
V	Mauritius	Port Louis	16–18 October 1993	President Veerasamy Ringadoo
V	Leaders importance of economic issues, calling for increased cooperation among Francophone business communities.			
VI	Benin	Cotonou	2–4 December 1995	President Nicéphore Soglo
VI	Summit agreed to create the position of Secretary General and transform the Agency for Cultural and Technical Cooperation (ACCT) into the Intergovernmental Agency of La Francophonie (AIF) and to establish the position of chief executive to manage it. The heads of state and government decided to focus the operating agencies' activities on the five major cooperation programs of La Francophonie: (1) freedom, democracy and development; (2) culture and communications; (3) knowledge and progress; (4) economics and development; and (5) La Francophonie in the world. This summit also underscored the promotion of cultural diversity as more legitimate and necessary than ever, ascribing it a role in promoting peace.			
VII	Vietnam	Hanoi	14–16 November 1997	President Trần Đức Lương
VII	Revised Charter was implemented and Boutros Boutros-Ghali was appointed the first secretary general. The summit's main theme was economic cooperation, however the Heads of State and Government also agreed to focus their efforts on peace and conflict prevention in member countries. In addition, they resolved to cooperate with the international community in protecting human rights.			
VIII	New Brunswick, Canada	Moncton	3–5 September 1999	Prime Minister Jean Chrétien
VIII	The summit's main theme was youth. Two secondary themes, the economy and new technologies, were also discussed. In Moncton, the heads of state and government also decided to hold three sectoral conferences in preparation for the following summit: (1) a symposium assessing democratic practices, rights and freedoms in the French-speaking world, to be held in Bamako, Mali; (2) a ministerial conference on culture in Cotonou, Benin; and (3) the first Women of La Francophonie conference in Luxembourg.			
IX	Lebanon	Beirut	18–20 October 2002	President Émile Lahoud
IX	The main theme of the summit was "Dialogue of Cultures". Issues relating to the Middle East were addressed. The heads of state and government made a commitment to implement the Bamako Declaration on democracy, good governance and human rights. The summit also indicated support for UNESCO's cultural diversity principle that entrenches the right of states and governments to maintain, establish and develop policies in support of culture and cultural diversity. Senegal's former president Abdou Diouf was elected Secretary General.			
X	Burkina Faso	Ouagadougou	26–27 November 2004	President Blaise Compaoré
X	The summit's main theme was "La Francophonie: A Space of Solidarity for Sustainable Development". A ministerial conference on conflict prevention and human security was held concurrently in St. Boniface, Manitoba, and adopted the very first ten-year strategic framework for La Francophonie, which henceforth defines its four main missions: (1) promoting the French language and cultural and linguistic diversity; (2) promoting peace, democracy and human rights; (3) supporting education, training, higher education and research and (4) developing cooperation to ensure sustainable development and solidarity.			
XI	Romania	Bucharest	28–29 September 2006	President Traian Băsescu
XI	The summit's main theme was "Information Technologies in Education". The heads of state and government passed five resolutions on (1) the Global Digital Solidarity Fund; (2) dumping of toxic waste in Abidjan, Côte d'Ivoire; (3) international migration and development; (4) the positioning of a UN force in the Central African Republic; and (5) climate change. The Ministerial Conference of La Francophonie approved a guide on the use of the French language in international organizations. Abdou Diouf was re-elected for a four-year term.			
XII	Quebec, Canada	Quebec City	17–19 October 2008	Prime Minister Stephen Harper
XII	Held as part of the 400th anniversary celebration of the founding of Quebec City. The world financial and food crises were discussed and environmental talks were held. Heads of state and government expressed their support for the initiative to hold a global summit on the financial crisis and the reform of the international economic system. They also pointed out that the financial crisis should not overshadow the food crisis and be resolved at the expense of developing countries.			
XIII	Switzerland	Montreux	22–24 October 2010	President Doris Leuthard
XIII	Issues discussed included climate change, food and economic crises, and problems related to biodiversity, water and forests. Montreux Declaration on the vision and future of the Francophonie was agreed calling for the organization to take a role in global governance and to support sustainable development, food security and biodiversity and combat climate change and to also support French language and education. Resolutions were passed on: (1) piracy; (2) counterfeit or expired pharmaceuticals; (3) transborder crime in Africa; (4) terrorism; (5) flood-affected countries; (6) the reconstruction of Haiti; (7) countries in crisis, crisis recovery and peacebuilding and finally, (8) the 10th anniversary of the Bamako Declaration, entrenching the political role of La Francophonie. The Summit also confirmed the re-election of Abdou Diouf for a third four-year term.			
XIV	Democratic Republic of the Congo	Kinshasa	12–14 October 2012	President Joseph Kabila
XIV	The theme of the summit was "La Francophonie, Economic and Environment Issues in the face of Global Governance". Resolutions were passed on (1) the situation in Mali; (2) the situation in the DRC; (3) piracy in the Gulf of Guinea; (4) good governance of the extractive and forest industries; and (5) crisis situations, crisis recovery and peacebuilding in La Francophonie.			
XV	Senegal	Dakar	29–30 November 2014	President Macky Sall
XV	The summit's main theme was "Women and Youth in La Francophonie: Agents for Peace and Development". Michaëlle Jean was elected Secretary-General. Heads of State and Government readdmited Guinea-Bissau, Madagascar and Mali, and to accept membership applications from Costa Rica, Mexico and Kosovo as observers of La Francophonie. Resolutions were passed on Maternal, Newborn and Child Health; the Ongoing Ebola Virus Epidemic in West Africa and the Risks of It Spreading through the Francophonie; Crisis Situations, Crisis Recovery and Peacebuilding in La Francophonie; Terrorism; the UNESCO Convention on the Protection and Promotion of the Diversity of Cultural Expressions; Education and Training of Women and Youth in the Digital Age; Financial and Banking Education; Counterfeit Drugs and Medical Products; and the Promotion of Sustainable Tourism in Small Island Developing States.			
XVI	Madagascar	Antananarivo	26–27 November 2016	Prime Minister Olivier Solonandrasana
XVI	The theme of the summit was "Shared Growth and Responsible Development: Conditions for Stability Around the World and within the Francophonie". The Summit addressed crisis and consolidation of peace in the Francophone world including questions of security and responding to Daesh [ISIS] and its affiliates in Africa, the promotion of gender equality, the empowerment of women and girls, the prevention of extremism, and the vocational and technical training, energy, the promotion of linguistic diversity, the situation of children, local development, environment, dialogue between cultures as a factor of sustainable development, road safety and the blue economy. Canadian prime minister Justin Trudeau raised the issue of LGBT rights. The Canadian province of Ontario was granted observer status in the organization.			
XVII	Armenia	Yerevan	11–12 October 2018	Prime Minister Nikol Pashinyan
XVII	Michaëlle Jean sought a second four-year term as Secretary-General but was defeated by Rwandan foreign minister Louise Mushikiwabo, who was French President Macron's personal choice. This unilateral decision by the French President was strongly criticized by four former French government members responsible for the francophonie dossier who also criticized the deplorable human rights record of Rwanda under Paul Kagame and Mushikiwabo. Saudi Arabia withdrew its application for observer status after its bid was opposed due to criticisms of the lack of human rights in the country and concerns over the disappearance of journalist Jamal Khashoggi, while Ghana was promoted from associate to full membership. The American state of Louisiana was granted observer status. The summit adopted declarations on the organization's budget, equality between men and women, and other issues.			
XVIII	Tunisia	Djerba	19–20 November 2022	Prime Minister Najla Bouden
XVIII	Summit was scheduled for 2020, the 50th anniversary of the OIF, but it was delayed. Its objective was to become a "space for solidarity that is better governed, more inclusive, digital, innovative, sustainable and prosperous for its people" by 2030. This was to be achieved by promoting: (1) the influence of French speakers; (2) the use of French; (3) cultural and linguistic diversity; (4) the OIF as a space for peace, stability, democracy, and human rights; and (5) the OIF as a hub for cooperation and innovation. French President Macron emphasised 3 areas to support "the ambition for the French language and multilingualism", which were: (1) learning; (2) communicating; and (3) creating. Louise Mushikiwabo was re-elected as Secretary General.			
XIX	France	Villers-Cotterêts and Paris	4–5 October 2024	President Emmanuel Macron
XIX	The theme of the summit was "creating, innovating and undertaking in French". Leaders discussed ways to promote the French language, geopolitical challenges, ways to ensure the digital space reflects linguistic and cultural diversity, and increasing economic ties between countries. Members unanimously called for an immediate ceasefire in the Israel–Hezbollah conflict. Leaders of Mali, Burkina Faso and Niger were not invited to attend. The three countries, all under military rule, have also been suspended from the African Union and the Economic Community of West African States and formed their own confederation, the Alliance of Sahel States.			
XX	Cambodia	Phnom Penh	15–16 November 2026	King Norodom Sihamoni
XX	The summit's theme was "Reinvesting in peace for shared prosperity and lasting stability". Leaders adopted the Phnom Penh Declaration, a resolution on crises and peacebuilding, and an appeal for the protection of cultural heritage. Saint Kitts and Nevis and the Canadian province of Manitoba were admitted as observers. A dispute over the re-election of Secretary-General Louise Mushikiwabo, a former Rwandan foreign minister, threatened to prompt the withdrawal of the Democratic Republic of the Congo, which opposed another term for her amid the conflict in eastern Congo and Rwanda's support for M23 rebels. After negotiations failed to produce agreement on a successor, members extended Mushikiwabo's term by one year, with a new election to be held in 2027. Rwanda agreed not to seek the post in that election. The summit also confirmed that the next meeting would take place in Ottawa, Canada, in 2028.			
XXI	Canada	Ottawa-Gatineau	2028	Prime Minister Mark Carney

=== Ministerial Conference ===
The Ministerial Conference of the Francophonie gathers the foreign or francophone affairs ministers of member states and governments every year to ensure the political continuity of the Summit. This conference ensures that the decisions made during the previous Summits are carried out and to plan the next Summit. It also recommends new members and observers to the Summit.

=== Permanent Council ===
The Permanent Council of the Francophonie gathers the Ambassadors of the member countries, chaired by the General Secretary of the Francophonie and under the authority of the Ministerial Conference, its main task is to plan Summits. This conference also supervises the execution of the Summit decisions made by the ministerial conferences on a day-to-day basis, about the examination of the propositions of the budget distribution.

=== Parliamentary Assembly ===
The objectives of the Parliamentary Assembly of the Francophonie (APF) are to represent to the French-speaking authorities, the interests of the French-speaking communities, to promote the democracy, the rule of law and the respect of human rights. Furthermore, it follows the execution by the operators of the Francophonie of action plans elaborated by the Conference of the members using French as a common language. It also favours the cooperation and strengthens the solidarity within the French-speaking communities, mainly towards the parliaments of the South. The Parliamentary Assembly of the Francophonie is constituted by member sections representing 77 parliaments or interparliamentary organizations. The Secretary General is the French senator Jacques Legendre.

=== Agency of the Francophonie ===
The Agency of the Francophonie is the main operator of the cultural, scientific, technical, economic and legal cooperation programs decided at the Summits. It is also the legal seat of the Secretary General and is used by him as an administrative support. The agency also contributes to the development of the French language and to the promotion of the diverse languages and cultures of its members, while encouraging mutual understanding between them and the Francophonie. For this reason, it is a place of exchange and dialogue and its simultaneous in Francophone countries. The Agency's headquarters are in Paris and it has three regional branches in Libreville, Gabon; Lomé, Togo; and Hanoi, Vietnam.

== Members ==
Members of and participants in the Francophonie: member (national) member (regional) associated member suspended member observer

Mauritania's membership was suspended on 26 August 2008, pending democratic elections, after a military coup d'état. Madagascar's membership was suspended in April 2009 due to an unconstitutional transfer of power on 17 March 2009. Mali's membership was also suspended in March 2012 due to a coup d'état, and then the Central African Republic was suspended at the 88th session of the CPF (March 2012), as well as Guinea-Bissau on 18 April 2012 for the same reason. Thailand, an observer nation, was suspended in 2014 following the 2013–14 political crisis. In 2018, Louisiana became the first US state to join, as an observer. In 2021, the government of Nova Scotia announced its intention to apply for observer status. In 2023, there was a coup in Gabon, which was condemned by the OIF, but unlike others, the country wasn't suspended from the OIF. Gabon asked to be heard by the other members and the OIF member states finally decided not to suspend Gabon.

In September 2024 the OIF lifted its sanctions on Guinea, which had been in place since 2021 following a military coup. In March 2025, Niger announced its withdrawal from the organization three years after it was suspended. This was followed by the withdrawal of Burkina Faso and Mali, which cited "selective application of sanctions" and "contempt for Mali's sovereignty".

Although the French language is popular in Algeria and Algeria used to be a colony and later an internal part of France, it is currently not a member of the organization.

== Operating agencies ==
The organization relies on five operating agencies to carry out its mandate: l'Agence Universitaire de la Francophonie (AUF); TV5Monde; l'Association Internationale des Maires Francophones (AIMF); l'Association des Fonctionnaires Francophones des Organisations Internationales (AFFOI); and l'Université Senghor d'Alexandrie.

=== Association of Francophone Universities ===
Established in 1961 in Montreal, the Association of Francophone Universities gathers institutions of higher education and research among the Francophone countries of Africa, the Arab world, Southeast Asia, Central and Eastern Europe, and the Caribbean.

Its mission is to contribute to the construction and consolidation of a scientific space in French. It supports the French language, cultural and linguistic diversity, law and democracy, and the environment and sustainable development. It also provides an important mobility program for the students, the researchers and the professors.

Its mission is to support the French language and the linguistic diversity within international organizations. Every year the association coordinates the day of French language within International Organisations. It also organizes seminaries to increase awareness about the importance of linguistic, cultural and conceptual diversity. The president is the French international civil servant Dominique Hoppe.

=== TV5Monde ===
TV5Monde is the first international French language television network, available in many countries. On television and online the audience of TV5Monde has grown rapidly. TV5 is one of the three largest television networks in the world (along with the BBC and CNN). It provides wide access to original television programs in French, and contributes to the development of the language and French-speaking cultures. It broadcasts the different forms of the French language spoken around the world, with all their accents. It reaches beyond native speakers of French; the majority of those who can receive it and part of its audience comprise viewers for whom French is not the mother tongue. Thanks to subtitles in various languages, it provides access to the Francophonie to non-French speakers – it is translated into 12 languages.

=== International Association of French-speaking Mayors ===
The International Association of French-speaking Mayors was created in Quebec City in 1979 by Jean Pelletier and Jacques Chirac, then the respective mayors of Quebec City and Paris with an initial group of 20 founder-cities. It is an operating agency for urban development gathering 48 countries or governments. The goal is to establish close cooperation in all areas of municipal activities. Its missions are to strengthen local democracy, building municipal capacities, and to support the populations. The association pursues its actions in the domains of health, culture, youth and education, urban development, training, and municipal infrastructures.

The association is presided by Anne Hidalgo (Paris' mayor) since 2009, with Pierre Baillet as permanent secretary.

=== Senghor University of Alexandria ===
The project of creating a French-speaking university in the service of African development was presented and adopted following the Dakar Summit in 1989. The Senghor University in Alexandria, Egypt is a private postgraduate institution that trains managers and high-level trainers in areas that are a priority for development in Francophone Africa. It directs the capacities of the managers and trainers to the action and the exercise of responsibilities in certain domains for the development: the project management, the financial institutions, the environment, the nutrition-health and of the cultural heritage. The Senghor University regularly organizes seminaries to help its students and of the public specialized in the domains of its action, by collaborating with the other operators and the institutions of the Francophonie.

== Missions ==
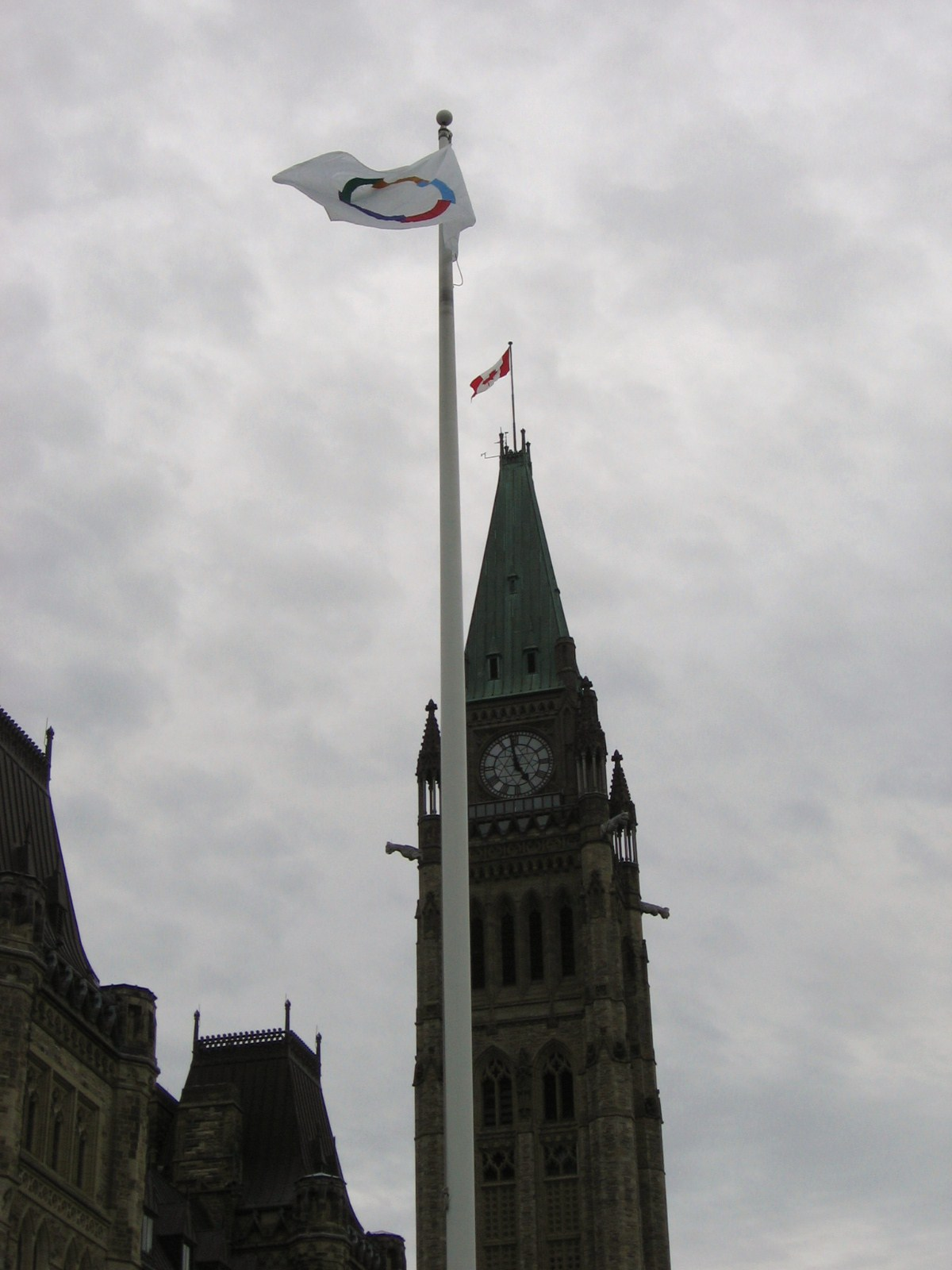
The Francophonie flag flying at the Parliament of Canada in Ottawa

The International Organisation of the Francophonie leads political actions and multilateral cooperation according to the missions drawn by the Summits of the Francophonie. The Summits gather the Heads of states and governments of the member countries of the International Organisation of the Francophonie where they discuss international politics, world economy, French-speaking cooperation, human rights, education, culture and democracy. Actions of the International Organization of the Francophonie are scheduled over a period of four years and funded by contributions from its members.

The Charte de la Francophonie defines the role and missions of the organization. The current charter was adopted in Antananarivo, on 23 November 2005. The summit held in Ouagadougou, Burkina Faso on 26–27 November 2004 saw the adoption of a strategic framework for the period 2004–2014.

The four missions drawn by the Summit of the Francophonie are:

1. Promoting French language and cultural and linguistic diversity.
2. Promoting peace, democracy and human rights.
3. Supporting education, training, higher education and scientific research.
4. Expand cooperation for sustainable development.

=== French language, cultural and linguistic diversity ===
The primary mission of the organization is the promotion of the French language as an international language and the promotion of worldwide cultural and linguistic diversity in the era of economic globalization. In this regard, countries that are members of the Francophonie have contributed largely to the adoption by the UNESCO of the Convention on the Protection and Promotion of the Diversity of Cultural Expressions (20 October 2005).

At the national level, there is the problem of promoting the French language within the context of its co-existence with other partner or international languages in most member countries, especially in Africa. Maintaining the relative importance of the status of French is an imperative that requires solidarity and the pooling of means and resources among countries committed to the French language within their respective societies.

The Francophonie has played an important role in promoting cultural diversity and encouraging dialogue between different cultures. As globalisation continues to influence societies around the world, it faces the challenge of maintaining cultural differences while supporting the preservation and development of diverse languages, traditions and identities.

=== Peace, democracy and human rights ===
Similar to the British Commonwealth of Nations, the Francophonie has as its stated aims the promotion of democracy and human rights. Following the 3 November 2000 Déclaration de Bamako, the Francophonie has given itself the financial means to attain a number of set objectives in that regard.

The Francophonie intends to contribute significantly to promoting peace, democracy and support for the rule of law and human rights by focusing on prevention. Political stability and full rights for all, the subject of the Bamako declaration, are considered key to sustainable development.

The Francophonie has chosen to provide its member countries with access to the expertise of its extensive intergovernmental, institutional, academic and non-governmental network with a view to building national capacities, resolving conflict and providing support for ending crises.

In recent years, some participating governments, notably the governments of Canada and Quebec, pushed for the adoption of a Charter in order for the organization to sanction member States that are known to have poor records when it comes to the protection of human rights and the practice of democracy. Such a measure was debated at least twice but was never approved.

=== Supporting education, training, higher education and research ===
The International Organisation of the Francophonie aims at connecting the various peoples using French as a common language through their knowledge. Education, like access to autonomy and information for all, begins with all children having access to a full primary education free of any inequality. It involves an integrated approach of teaching and training from primary to secondary school that will lead to employment. Education policies must also give French an integral place alongside the partner languages. Last, the research potential of French-language academic streams must be promoted.

=== Cooperation for sustainable development ===
The Francophonie is committed to working towards sustainable development by supporting the improvement of economic governance, capacity building, cooperation and the search for common positions in major international negotiations. It's necessary to manage durably the natural resources, particularly the energy and the water, and politics are established to make sure of the conservation of these resources with effective anti-poverty campaigns.

In 2013, the United Nations Volunteers programme received a financial contribution from the Federal Public Service (FPS) Foreign Affairs, Foreign Trade and Development Cooperation of the Kingdom of Belgium for the years 2013 and 2014 to support the outreach to the francophone world and the promotion of volunteerism via its Online Volunteering service.

== Criticism of the organization ==
=== Growing non-Francophone states in OIF ===
The membership of the OIF has climbed from 21 in 1970 to 88 member states and territories in 2018. This sharp increase in the number of member states, many of whom have little to no connection with the French language and culture, has been a matter of growing concern. In their 1996 study on the Francophone space, linguists Daniel Baggioni and Roland Breton pointed out, alluding to the applications of Bulgaria and Angola to join the OIF, that only politico-diplomatic criteria could explain these odd extensions of the OIF. Xavier Deniau, founder of the Association des parlementaires de langue française (now the Parliamentary assembly) and author of La Francophonie, expressed concern that the enlargement of the OIF to countries where French is practically nonexistent risks diluting the effectiveness of the organization. Despite calls for a moratorium on the admission of new members, each new Sommet de la Francophonie has witnessed the admission of batches of new members that have little, if anything, to do with the French language: Bosnia-Herzegovina, the Dominican Republic, the United Arab Emirates, Estonia and Montenegro in 2010; Qatar and Uruguay in 2012; Mexico, Costa Rica and Kosovo in 2014. On that occasion, the Montreal daily Le Devoir, which reports extensively on the OIF and its summits, remarked that several members of this "merry madhouse" that the OIF had become did not even recognize Kosovo as a country. The "endless enlargement" of the Organisation accelerated following the arrival at the head of the OIF of former UN Secretary General Boutros-Ghali who declared early in his term in 1998 that French being in his opinion the language of solidarity, tolerance, respect for the individual, cultural diversity, universality and openness, the OIF needed to open itself to non francophones. The motivation of small and mid-size countries in joining the organization appears to be a desire to increase their international visibility. In October 2018, the Irish Department for Foreign Affairs explained that Ireland's accession with observer status would "Develop and deepen Ireland's institutional linkages with Africa" and allow the country to "play a more influential role in locations including the Sahel... and to engage on the challenges facing countries in French-speaking West Africa." A departmental review in May 2023 added that "new Embassies in Senegal and Morocco represent Ireland's first missions in francophone Africa and complement our recent accession as an observer member".

Following the arrival of Boutros-Ghali, the OIF had also seen a steady increase in the number of its missions and priority action areas — peace and conflict prevention, human rights, democracy, international cooperation, sustainable development, cultural and linguistic diversity, education and training, youth, gender equality, civil society — bringing a fundamental shift from the cultural to the political sphere. Jacques Legendre, the French senate's rapporteur on the Francophonie, expressed his concern that the OIF was becoming "a second-rate duplicate of the General Assembly of the UN". Many actors of the francophone sphere interested in the future of the organization, including former French ministers or secretaries of state for the Francophonie such as Pierre-André Wiltzer and Jean-Baptiste Lemoyne, have been calling on the OIF to refocus on its fundamentals: language and culture.

=== Human rights in member states ===
While promoting human rights is stated as a core mission of the OIF, many of its member countries governments have or have had poor human rights records. At the 1999 Francophonie Summit in Moncton, Canadian Prime Minister Jean Chrétien and former French President Jacques Chirac announced at the close of the summit that a human rights observatory would be established to further promote human rights within the OIF. The French newspaper Le Monde noted in 1999 that if respect for fundamental freedoms were made a strict criterion for membership, the organization might effectively cease to exist given the number of member governments with poor human rights records at the time. In 2000, the OIF adopted the Déclaration de Bamako concerning democracy and human rights.

In May 2018, French President Emmanuel Macron announced that his government would support the nomination of Louise Mushikiwabo, Rwanda's longtime foreign minister, as the next Secretary General of the OIF. Critics, including human rights organizations, viewed this as a setback for the OIF's role in defending and promoting human rights, citing Mushikiwabo's close relationship with Rwandan President Paul Kagame, whose government has faced significant criticism from human rights advocates.

== Support for the organization ==
Ambassador James Roscoe, UK Acting Deputy Permanent Representative to the UN, commented in 2020:

The Francophonie undoubtedly has a role to play alongside the UN and other organisations in the fields of conflict prevention, mediation and the exercise of good offices, including in settings such as Cameroon. The UK encourages the Francophonie, along with the UN, the African Union, ECCAS and the Commonwealth, to continue to support efforts to end violence and restore peace in Cameroon's northwest and southwest regions.

The Francophonie can also make valuable contributions to the UN's efforts to assist countries emerging from conflict to hold successful elections and to strengthen the role of democratic governance.

== See also ==
- Agence de coopération culturelle et technique
- Minister responsible for La Francophonie (Canada)
- Jeux de la Francophonie
- International Francophonie Day (Journée internationale de la Francophonie)
- Conseil international de la langue française
- French immersion
- Alliance française
- Espace Francophone pour la Recherche, le Développement et l'Innovation
- Journée internationale de la Francophonie (March 20)
- Francophone
- French colonial empire
- Geographical distribution of French speakers
- French in Africa
- French in India
- French in the United States
- Franco-Canadian relations
- French America
- Vietnamese French
- Lao French
- Cambodian French
- List of countries where French is an official language
- List of international organisations which have French as an official language
- List of French possessions and colonies
- Three Linguistic Spaces

== Notes ==
By ISO 639-3 code
Enter an ISO code to find the corresponding language article.
