= Mey Son Sotheary =

Cambodian novelist (born 1977)

Mey Son Sotheary, born 1977, is a Cambodian writer of fiction and nonfiction. She is best known for short stories exploring the effects of economic and social changes, particularly on women, young people, and migrant workers.

== Works ==
Her fiction has focused on the social effects of rapid political and economic changes, particularly as they affect women and young people. Her short story “My Sister” (first published in Khmer in 1995, and in English translation in 2002), describes a young woman who moves from a rural village to the city and finds work as a “bar girl”, sending her earnings home to help support the education of her younger siblings. The narrator of the story, the woman's younger brother, chastises her for engaging in sex work, but he is scolded by his aunt for ingratitude. The story explores the experience of migrant workers and the practice of remittance, by which rural migrants to urban centres send their wages back to their home village, improving the financial situation of their family but sometimes creating tensions or resentment.

Her story “Why?” describes a boy’s decision to turn to robbery to support his family and its consequences.

In translation, her short stories have appeared in anthologies of Southeast Asian and Cambodian fiction, and have been assigned as university set texts.

Her nonfiction work includes the book Tumroam Klay Chea Neak Nipunth (“Before becoming a writer"), a guide for aspiring Khmer authors.

== Career ==
Mey began publishing as a teenager in 1993, when her short fiction appeared in Rasmei Kampuchia Daily, Cambodia’s most widely circulated daily newspaper, and in the popular magazine Procheaprai.

She was one of the first published Khmer writers to come from the "new generation", i.e. those who did not personally remember the regime of Pol Pot.

She has also worked in television broadcasting, and for the Women’s Media Centre of Cambodia, an NGO that works to improve the participation and representation of women in mainstream Khmer media.
