= Black Out (1970 film) =

1970 film

- Directed by: Jean-Louis Roy
- Written by: Jean-Louis Roy; Patricia Moraz
- Starring: Marcel Merminod
- Cinematography: Roger Bimpage
- Release date: 1970
- Running time: 92 minutes
- Country: Switzerland
- Language: French

Black Out is a 1970 Swiss film directed by Jean-Louis Roy. It was entered into the 20th Berlin International Film Festival.

== Cast ==
- Marcel Merminod as Émile Blummer
- Lucie Avenay as Élise Blummer
- Marcel Imhoff as Le pasteur
- Georges Wod as Le capitaine Schnertz
- Robert Bachofner as Le petit garçon
- Michel Breton as Le vendeur
