= Cambodian French (disambiguation) =

Cambodian French or French Cambodian may refer to:

- Cambodian French (linguistics), the dialect of French spoken in Cambodia
- Cambodians in France
- Mixed race people of Cambodian and French descent
