= Léopold K. Fakambi =

Beninese engineer and agronomist (1942–2021)

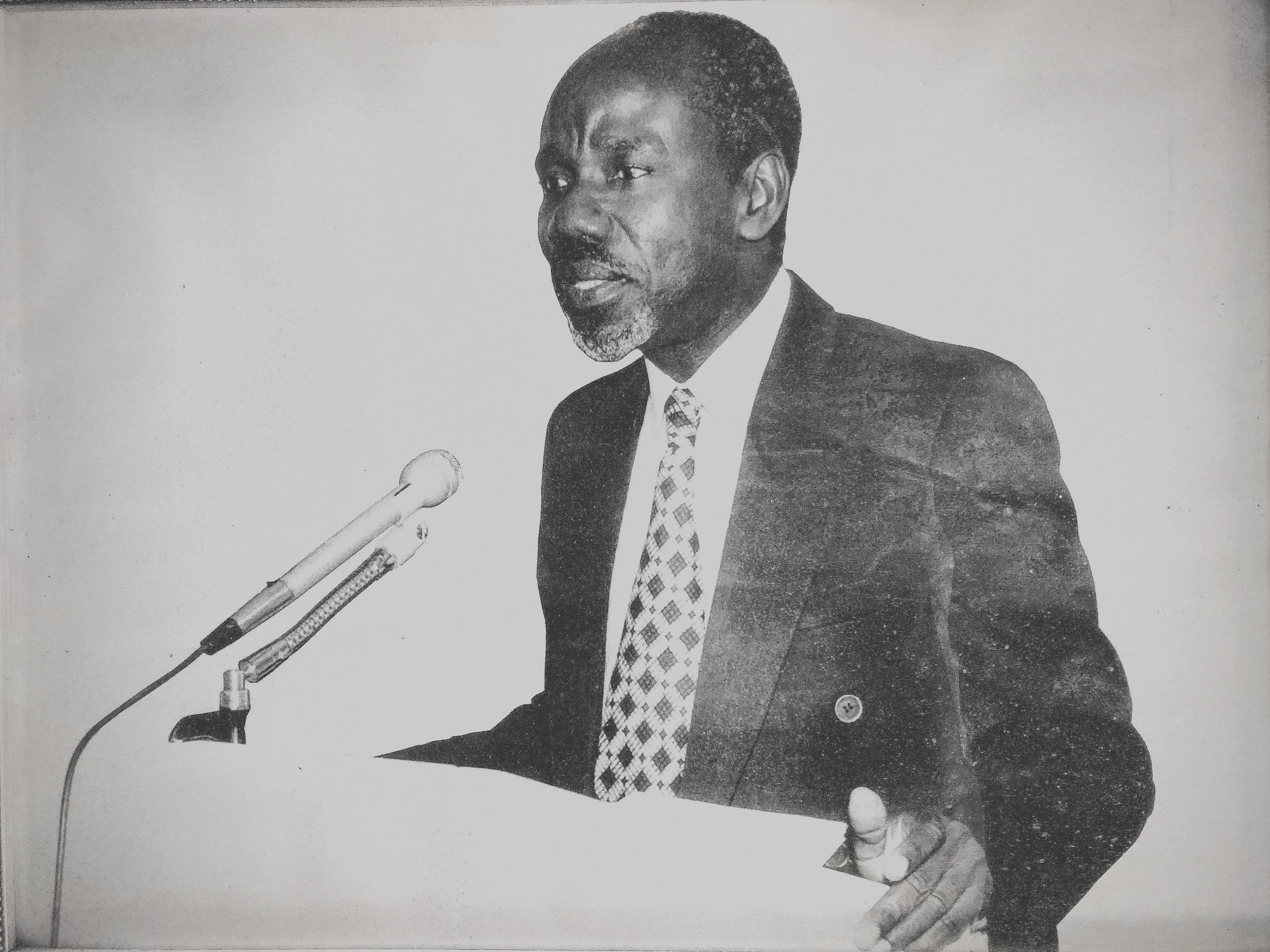
- Born: Léopold Kocou Fakambi; 21 October 1942; Lomé, Togoland, French West Africa
- Died: 24 August 2021 (aged 78)
- Occupations: Engineer; Agronomist

Léopold Kocou Fakambi (21 October 1942 – 24 August 2021) was a Beninese agronomist, engineer, nutritionist, and academic.

== Biography ==
Fakambi was born in Lomé on 21 October 1942. He spent secondary school at the Lycée Béhanzin in Porto-Novo from 1955 to 1962 and subsequently his classes préparatoires scientifiques in Besançon. Later, he studied at the Lycée Janson-de-Sailly in Paris. He entered the Institut national agronomique in 1964 and defended his doctoral thesis at the Sorbonne in 1970.

Fakambi became a professor of plant physiology at the University of Benin before serving as founding dean of the Faculty of Agronomic Sciences at the University of Abomey-Calavi. For many years, he served on the Council of Administration at the International Institute of Tropical Agriculture in Ibadan. He also worked as a visiting professor at Senghor University in Alexandria. He co-founded the Formation Internationale en Nutrition et Sciences Alimentaires and served as Director from 1992 to 2000. He was also a founding member of the Conseil national de l’Alimentation et de la Nutrition in Benin.

Léopold K. Fakambi died on 24 August 2021 at the age of 78.

== Distinctions ==
- Knight of the National Order of Benin
- Knight of the Ordre des Palmes académiques

== Publications ==
- Interaction du calcium et des lipides alimentaires : Mise en évidence de l'excrétion fécale de savons de calcium chez le rat (1971)
- Factors affecting the nutritional status of mothers : the food and nutrition program of the Ouando Horticulture and Nutrition Center in the People's Republic of Benin (1990)
- Évaluation de la nutrition pour USAID-Bénin : 3-14 mars 1997 (1997)
- Alimentation et épanouissement physique et intellectuel de l’enfant
