= Bollore =

Bollore can refer to:

== Companies ==
- Bolloré S.E., a listed French investment and industrial holding group
- Bolloré Investissement S.A., a French investment and industrial holding group, parent company of Bolloré S.E.

== Surname ==
- Vincent Bolloré is a billionaire French industrialist, corporate raider, businessman and Chairman of Bolloré S.E.

== See also ==
- Espace Francophone pour la Recherche, le Développement et l'Innovation
