= Phnom Penh Cable Television =

Cambodian TV subscription service

PPCTV Co., LTD
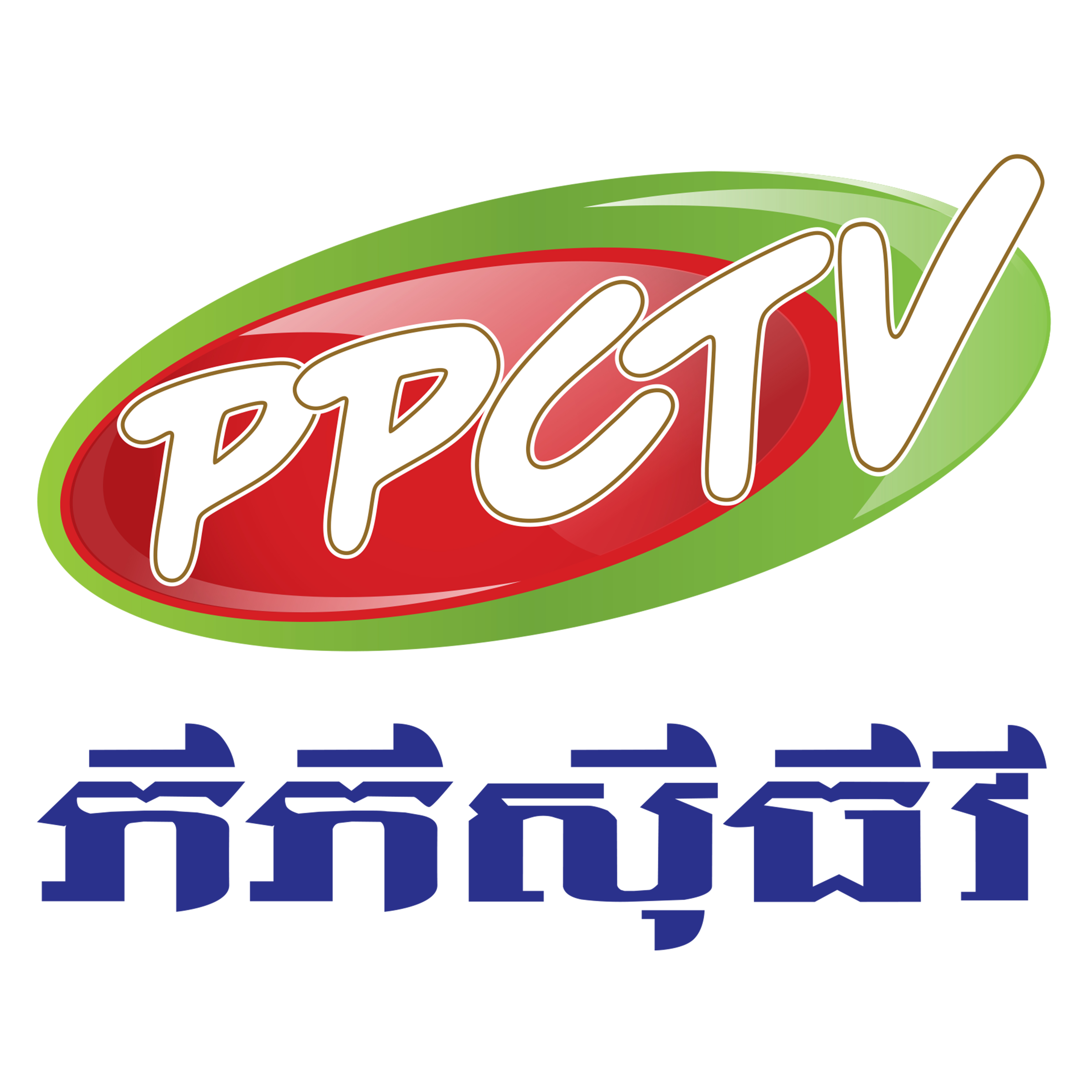
- Country: Cambodia
- Broadcast area: Cambodia
- Headquarters: No.3, Street 217, Phum 7 Sangkat Veal Vong, Khan 7 Makara, Phnom Penh, Cambodia

Programming
- Language: Khmer
- Picture format: 1080i (HDTV)

Ownership
- Owner: Phnom Penh Municipal Cable TV
- Key people: H.E Okhna Sok Chamroeun
- Sister channels: CTV8HD (UHF Channel 48); ITVHD (UHF Channel 37); PPCTV6; PPCTV 9 PPCTV 10

History
- Launched: 1995; 31 years ago

Links
- Website: ppctv.com.kh

PPCTV Co., LTD , also known as PPCTV, is a Cambodian cable TV subscription service established by Phnom Penh Municipal Cable Television (PPCTV). It is one of the major cable TV services in Cambodia with the largest number of viewers concentrated in Phnom Penh.

PPCTV also owns CTV8, a free-to-air terrestrial television network. The company is presided by Sok Chamroeun; he also owns cable TV systems in Siem Reap and Kompong Thorn (Angkor Cable Television, AKCTV) and Sihanoukville (CKCTV).

== History ==
PPCTV started distributing its services on cable with just only 36 channels in 1995, then expanding to 48 channels continued to 52 channels and finally 66 channels. It was the first cable provider in Cambodia, in partnership with TVB and Mediacorp. In 2009, PPCTV started digital cable television service and broadband Internet.

In 2015, PPCTV and Mediacorp started the Phnom Penh Cable Television MediaCorp Awards.
