= The Voice of Khmer Youth =

- Type: Weekly newspaper
- Language: Khmer
- Headquarters: Cambodia

The Voice of Khmer Youth is a weekly newspaper published in Cambodia.

== See also ==
- List of newspapers in Cambodia
