= Member states of the Organisation internationale de la Francophonie =

Map highlighting member states member (national) member (regional) associated member suspended member observer

This is a list of the member states of the Organisation internationale de la Francophonie. These governments belong to an international organisation representing countries and regions where French is the first ("mother") or customary language, where a significant proportion of the population are francophones (French speakers) or where there is a notable affiliation with French culture.

== List of member, associate, observer states ==
=== Member states ===
Country	Joined	Language	Notes
Albania	1999	Albanian	Brief French protectorate in Korçë between 1916 and 1920. Approximately 30% of young Albanians choose French as their first foreign language. Albania is home to 300,000 French speakers, and it is the second foreign language of education after English.
Andorra	2004	Catalan	Formerly part of First French Empire. The President of France is also a Co-Prince of Andorra.
Armenia	2012	Armenian	See further: Armenia-France relations
Belgium	1970	officially trilingual, French included	French is the native language of about 39% of the population 48% are non-native speakers of French. Belgium's French community is also a member separately. See also: Languages of Belgium and Belgian French
* (Wallonia) French Community of Belgium (Note: Belgian linguistic community)	1980	French as official language	A community of Belgium with its two components Wallonia (excluding the German-speaking community) and Brussels-Capital Region (its French-speaking majority)
Benin	1970	French	Former French colony
Bulgaria	1993	Bulgarian	French is spoken as a foreign language by 9% of the Bulgarian people, and taught as a main foreign language in about 25% of primary schools. Furthermore, French is studied by 7.7% of high school students.
Burkina Faso	1970	French	Former French colony. Membership suspended in 2022 due to a coup. (Note: In March 2025, Niger announced its withdrawal from the organization three years after it was suspended. This was followed by the withdrawal of Burkina Faso and Mali, which cited "selective application of sanctions" and "contempt for Mali’s sovereignty".)
Burundi	1970	officially trilingual, French	Former Belgian UN-protectorate
Cambodia	1993	Khmer	Former French protectorate (as a part of former French Indochina)
Cameroon	1991	officially bilingual, French included	Over 90% of country was a French protectorate (1945–1959)
Canada	1970	officially bilingual, French included	The provinces of Quebec and New Brunswick are participating governments; much of eastern Canada was part of the first French colonial empire. As of 2004, a government representative from Ontario also attends as part of the Canadian delegation, although Ontario is not yet a participating government in its own right.
* New Brunswick (Note: Canadian province)	1977	officially bilingual, French included	Considered a "participating government", this province of Canada is officially bilingual English-French and home to the largest community of Acadians.
* Quebec	1971	French	Considered a "participating government", this province of Canada has French as its official language and is home to 85% of Canada's native francophones.
Cape Verde	1996	Portuguese	French is spoken as a foreign language by ~11% of the population as of 2014
Central African Republic	1973	officially bilingual, French included	Former French colony. The Central African Republic was suspended for instances of la Francophonie at the 88th session of the CPF in March 2012.
Chad	1970	officially bilingual, French included	Former French colony
Comoros	1977	officially trilingual, French included	Former French colony
Congo-Brazzaville	1981	French	Former French colony
Congo-Kinshasa	1977	French	Former Belgian colony. See also: Languages of the DRC
Côte d'Ivoire	1970	French	Former French colony. See also: Languages of Côte d'Ivoire
Cyprus	2024	Greek, Turkish	Cyprus was ruled by the French-origin Lusignan dynasty from 1192 until 1489. About 12% of the Cyprus population speaks and understands French.
Djibouti	1977	officially bilingual, French included	Former French colony
Dominica	1979	English	French and then British colony; Antillean Creole, a French-based creole language, is spoken by 90% of the population.
Egypt	1983	Arabic	French sees use as foreign language in education and the country was a French colony for a short period from 1798 to 1801
Equatorial Guinea	1989	officially trilingual, French included	Country surrounded by French-speaking countries. Former Spanish colony
France	1970	French	Founder, origin of the French language
Gabon	1970	French	Former French colony
Ghana	2024	English	All land borders with French-speaking countries (all former colonies of French West Africa) and trade partners. Study of French is being made compulsory at the basic educational level and certain subjects will be taught in both English and French.
Greece	2004	Greek	French spoken as a foreign language by ~7% of the population as of 2014
Guinea	1981–2021; 2024	French	Former French colony. Membership suspended in 2021 due to a coup, but was reinstated in 2024.
Guinea-Bissau	1979	Portuguese	Country surrounded by French-speaking countries. Former Portuguese colony. Guinea-Bissau was suspended on 18 April 2012 following a coup d'état.
Haiti	1970	officially bilingual, French included	Former French colony
Laos	1991	Lao	Former French colony (as a part of former French Indochina)
Lebanon	1973	Arabic and French (Note: French is the secondary language in Lebanon.)	Under a French mandate from 1920 to 1943
Luxembourg	1970	officially trilingual, French included	
North Macedonia	2001	Macedonian	French spoken as a foreign language by ~11% of the population as of 2014
Madagascar	1970–1977; 1989	officially bilingual, French included	Former French colony
Mali	1970	French	Former French colony. Mali's membership was suspended in March 2012 due to a coup, and again in 2020.
Mauritania	1980	Arabic	Former French colony, French is an administrative language. Mauritania's membership was suspended on 26 August 2008, pending democratic elections, after a military coup d'état, then again in April 2009.
Mauritius	1970	Creole is the mother tongue. French and English are also widely used	Dutch, French, and then British colony; French is widely used in commerce and by the media. French is also a language of instruction in schools.
Moldova	1996	Romanian	French spoken as a foreign language by ~2% of the population as of 2014
Monaco	1970	French	Independent country enclaved in France
Morocco	1981	Arabic and Berber	Former French and Spanish protectorate
Niger	1970	French	Former French colony. Membership suspended due to a coup in 2023.
Romania	1993	Romanian	French is understood and spoken by 26% of the population.
Rwanda	1970	officially quadrilingual, French included	Former Belgian UN-protectorate. In 2009, became a member of the Commonwealth, but remains a member within Francophonie.
Saint Lucia	1981	English	Former French and British colony. Antillean Creole, a French-based creole language, is spoken by 90% of the population.
São Tomé and Príncipe	1999	Portuguese	French spoken as a foreign language by ~20% of the population as of 2014
Senegal	1970	French	Former French colony
Seychelles	1976	officially trilingual, French included	Former French colony (first empire), later British colony, French is commonly used
Switzerland	1996	officially quadrilingual, French included	French is the native language of about 20% of all Swiss.
Togo	1970	French	Former French colony
Tunisia	1970	Arabic	Former French protectorate
Vanuatu	1979	officially trilingual, French included	Former French and British condominium of New Hebrides
Vietnam	1970 (Note: Originally joined as the Republic of Vietnam in 1970. Its successor, the Socialist Republic of Vietnam, re-joined the organisation in 1979.)	Vietnamese	Former French protectorates and colony, former French associated state

=== Associate states ===
Country	Joined	Language	Notes
Kosovo	2014	Albanian and Serbian	Traditional diplomatic and commercial ties with France. French is taught as a third language in most secondary schools. See further: France-Kosovo relations
New Caledonia	2016	French and New Caledonian languages	Sui generis collectivity of France. Former French colony (1853–1946) and overseas territory (1946–1999)
Qatar	2012	Arabic	Strong military ties with France. See further: France-Qatar relations
Serbia	2006	Serbian	Traditional diplomatic, military and cultural ties with France. French is widely taught as a second foreign language in schools. See further: France-Serbia relations
United Arab Emirates	2010	Arabic	Military and cultural ties with France See further: France-United Arab Emirates relations

=== Observer states ===
Country	Joined	Language	Notes
Angola	2024	Portuguese	
Argentina	2016	Spanish and others	Argentina has a large French community. Today more than six million Argentines have some degree of French ancestry (up to 17% of the total population).
Austria	2004	German	Roughly 11% of the population also speaks French as a foreign language as of 2014.
Bosnia and Herzegovina	2010	Bosnian, Croatian, Serbian	
Chile	2024	Spanish	Chile has a large French community. French is the second compulsory language in middle school.
Costa Rica	2014	Spanish	French is the second compulsory language in middle school.
Croatia	2004	Croatian	Part of the Illyrian Provinces under Napoleon's French Empire. See further: Croatia-France relations
Czechia	1999	Czech	~2% of the population speaks French as a foreign language as of 2014.
Dominican Republic	2010	Spanish	Neighbouring with Francophone Haiti at the west within Hispaniola.
Estonia	2010	Estonian	~1% of the population speaks French as a foreign language as of 2014.
French Polynesia	2024	French and Tahitian	Overseas collectivity and overseas country of France.
The Gambia	2018	English	Border with Senegal, a French-speaking country.
Georgia	2004	Georgian	~0.4% of the population speaks French as a foreign language as of 2014.
Hungary	2004	Hungarian	
Ireland	2018	English and Irish	French is the second most common foreign language spoken at home in Ireland (after Polish) and most commonly spoken by those born in Ireland.
Latvia	2008	Latvian	~1% of the population speaks French as a foreign language as of 2014.
Lithuania	1999	Lithuanian	~2% of the population speaks French as a foreign language as of 2014.
* Louisiana (Note: U.S. state)	2018	English	U.S. state with a francophone minority. Once part of the first French colonial empire — now it is home to a strong influence of Cajun, Creole, and Haitian language and culture. Use of the French language in Louisiana is promoted through the Council for the Development of French in Louisiana, a state agency that is responsible for preserving the state's "French heritage".
Malta	2018	Maltese and English	Formerly occupied by France.
* Manitoba	2026	English and French	An officially bilingual province of Canada. Francophones constituted the majority of the region's non-First Nations population until the mid 19th century, when anglophones became the linguistic majority. Manitoba's francophone minority are referred to as the Franco-Manitobans. In the 2021 Canadian census, 8.4% reported having knowledge of French and 2.8% reported it as their mother tongue.
Mexico	2014	Spanish	A large number of French immigrants arrived in Mexico since the 1830s and today number over six million French descendants. Second Mexican Empire, a puppet state of the Second French Empire under Napoleon III.
Montenegro	2010	Montenegrin	Part of the Illyrian Provinces under Napoleon's French Empire.
Mozambique	2006	Portuguese	Trading partner across the Mozambique Channel with French-speaking and the former French colony of Madagascar.
* Nova Scotia	2024	English	A province of Canada that was formerly part of Acadia and contains a community of Acadians. In the 2021 Canadian census, 10.4% of Nova Scotians reported having knowledge of French and 2.9% reported it as their mother tongue. French is also a recognized regional language in Nova Scotia.
* Ontario	2016	English (Note: French is a regional administrative language in Ontario.)	A province of Canada whose area was once a part of the Pays d'en Haut region of New France and is home to a francophone minority, the Franco-Ontarians. Although French is an official language in the province's judiciary, legislature, and educational system — the province as a whole is not officially bilingual — with other French-language provincial services not offered province-wide. However, Ontario's French Language Services Act does require Ontario government departments to provide French-language services in areas with significant francophone populations and recognizes the French language as a "historic language of Ontario".
Poland	1996	Polish	Long-standing cultural and historic ties — Henry III of France was King of Poland from 1573 to 1574 and the Duchy of Warsaw was a client state allied with the First French Empire from 1807 to 1815. France was home to notable Polish émigrés — including Adam Mickiewicz, Frédéric Chopin, and Marie Skłodowska-Curie.
* Saarland (Note: German state)	2024	German	A German state that was a French protectorate from 1947 to 1956 — two years after the dissolution of Nazi Germany in 1945.
Saint Kitts and Nevis	2026	English	Former French and English colony. French settlement occurred on Saint Kitts until France's defeat in 1782, which definitively gave control of the island to the British.
Slovakia	2002	Slovak	
Slovenia	1999	Slovene	Part of the Illyrian Provinces under Napoleon's French Empire
South Korea	2016	Korean	The Joseon Dynasty was invaded twice by the Second French Empire during the 19th century. Furthermore, the Catholic population grew as a result of French Jesuit missionaries in the country. See further: France-South Korea relations
Thailand	2008	Thai	Thailand's observer status was suspended from 2014 to 2019 for violating the Constitution, illegitimate seizure of power, and human rights violations. Thailand has a long history of international relations with France. See further: Thailand-France relations
Ukraine	2006	Ukrainian	
Uruguay	2012	Spanish	

Note:
Participation suspended
Founder of La Francophonie (OIF)
Withdrawn/suspended but rejoined again

== Other candidates ==
Some countries could also potentially join the Organisation internationale de la Francophonie on the basis of being part of the French colonial empire, including Algeria, Syria, Pondicherry (Note: Indian city) and Chandannagar regions of India. In 2016, Saudi Arabia applied to join the organisation despite having no historical colonial ties with France. However, the Saudis withdrew their bid in October 2018 due to pressure over their human rights record. In 2022, Brazil applied to join the organization as observer because it neighbours with French Guiana in the north and west; and it has a historical site named Fort Coligny in Rio de Janeiro built by French naval officer Nicolas Durand de Villegaignon in 1555. In 2024, Italian autonomous region of Valle d'Aosta (Note: Italian autonomous region) applied to join the organization as observer because it neighbours with Switzerland in the north and France in the west; and it has a 10% Francophone population.

== See also ==
- List of countries where French is an official language
