= Channel 3 (Cambodia) =

Phnom Penh Municipality Television Channel 3
- Country: Cambodia
- Headquarters: Phnom Penh, Cambodia

Programming
- Picture format: 4:3/16:9 (SDTV); 1080i (HDTV)

Ownership
- Owner: Phnom Penh Municipality Administration

History
- Launched: 8 August 1996; 30 years ago

Links
- Website: www.tv3.com.kh

Availability

Terrestrial
- Analogue: Channel 3 (VHF)

Streaming media
- KhmerLive: Watch live

Phnom Penh Municipality Television Channel 3 is a Cambodia television channel. The headquarters are located in Phnom Penh, Cambodia. The channel was established in 1996. The owner of the channel is the municipal administration itself.

== Appearances ==
=== Ident ===
Years	Description		
1996 – 2004	Bar with stripes in Cambodian flag colors with the character ៣ (3 in Khmer numerals) in it.	2004 – now	Bar with stripes in Cambodian flag colors with the text TV3 in it.

=== Broadcast times ===
- 1996 – Started up at 5.30 am and signed off at 2 am every day.
- 1997–2004 – Started up at 5.30 am and signed off at 2 am (Sometimes signed off at 1.30 am or 2.30 am)
- 2005–present – Broadcast 24 hours every day

== See also ==
- Media in Cambodia
