= Francophonie =

French-speaking world

Geographic distribution of the French language: Majority native language (core Francophonie) Official but not majority native language Administrative or cultural language but without official status

Proportion of French speakers (including L2-speakers) by country in 2022, saturating at 100%, according to the OIF 0–19% Francophone 20–39% Francophone 40–59% Francophone 60–79% Francophone 80–99% Francophone

The Francophonie or Francosphere or Francophone world is the whole body of people and organisations around the world who use the French language regularly for private or public purposes. The term was coined by Onésime Reclus in 1880 and became important as part of the conceptual rethinking of cultures and geography in the late 20th century.

When used to refer to the French-speaking world, the Francophonie encompasses the countries and territories where French is official or serves as an administrative or major secondary language, which spans 50 countries and dependencies across all inhabited continents. It is a de jure official language in 26 countries (the third most number of countries after English and Arabic). The vast majority of these are also member states of the Organisation internationale de la Francophonie (OIF), a body uniting countries where French is spoken and taught.

While it holds official status in more than two dozen countries, it is the majority's first language in only five states and territories, (Note: French is spoken as a mother tongue by the majority of the population (in descending order of the number of speakers) in France, Canada (Quebec), Belgium (Wallonia and the Brussels-Capital Region), western Switzerland (Romandy) and Monaco.) as the rest of French-speaking nations use it primarily administratively and as a lingua franca among populations whose mother tongues are indigenous or regional languages. This disparity is reflected in the number of speakers: of the 327 million total (the 6th-most in the world), about 74 million are native speakers (the 22nd in the world). In 2017 it was among the top five most studied languages in the world with about 120 million learners.

== Denominations ==
Francophonie, francophonie and francophone space are syntagmatic. This expression is relevant to countries which speak French as their national language, may it be as a mother language or a secondary language.

These expressions are sometimes misunderstood or misused by English speakers. They can be synonymous but most of the time they are complementary.

- "francophonie", with a small "f", refers to populations and people who speak French for communication or/and in their daily lives.
- "Francophonie", with a capital "F", can be defined as referring to the governments, governmental and non-governmental organisations or governing officials that share the use of French in their work and exchange.
- "Francophone space", "Francophone world", "Francosphere" represents not only a linguistic or geographic reality, but also a cultural entity: for example describing any individual who identifies with one of the francophone cultures, may it be Slavic, Latin, Creole, North American or Oceanian for example.

== Origins ==
Map showing the member states of the Organisation internationale de la Francophonie (in blue and green). This map does not exactly represent the francophone space, as it is a political organisation.

The term francophonie was invented by Onésime Reclus in 1880: "We also put aside four large countries, Senegal, Gabon, Cochinchina and Cambodia, whose future from a "Francophone" point of view is still very doubtful, except perhaps for Senegal" (in French « Nous mettons aussi de côté quatre grands pays, le Sénégal, le Gabon, la Cochinchine, le Cambodge dont l’avenir au point de vue « francophone » est encore très douteux sauf peut-être pour le Sénégal »); and then used by geographers.

During the Third Republic, the French language progressively gained importance.

The Académie française, a French institution created in 1635 in charge of officially determining and unifying the rules and evolutions of the French language, participated in the promotion and the development of the French language.

== Countries ==
The definition of the Francophone world is distinguished by countries and territories where French is an official language, those where it is the native language of the majority of the population, and those where the language is used as a working language of administration or where the language still has an important cultural impact and prestige without having official status. There are 50 countries and territories which fall into this category, although in some countries the Francosphere is limited to certain regions or states.

Rank	Country/territory	French-speaking population (Note: Note: Excludes partial speakers and learners.)	Land area (km^{2})	Land area (sq mi)
1	France (Note: Note: Metropolitan France only.)	66,394,000	551,695	213,011
2	Democratic Republic of the Congo	48,925,000	2,344,858	905,354
3	Algeria	14,904,000	2,381,741	919,595
4	Morocco	13,457,000	446,550	172,410
5	Cameroon	11,491,000	475,650	183,650
6	Canada	11,061,000	9,984,670	3,855,100
7	Côte d'Ivoire	9,325,000	322,462	124,503
8	Belgium	8,815,000	30,528	11,787
9	Madagascar	7,729,000	587,041	226,658
10	Tunisia	6,321,000	163,610	63,170
11	Switzerland	5,889,000	41,291	15,943
12	Burkina Faso	5,404,000	274,200	105,900
13	Haiti	4,906,000	27,750	10,710
14	Senegal	4,640,000	196,712	75,951
15	Benin	4,306,000	114,763	44,310
16	Guinea	3,777,000	245,857	94,926
17	Mali	3,703,000	1,240,192	478,841
18	Togo	3,554,000	56,785	21,925
19	Congo	3,518,000	342,000	132,000
20	Niger	3,363,000	1,267,000	489,200
21	Lebanon	2,540,000	10,452	4,036
22	Chad	2,249,000	1,284,000	495,800
23	United States * Louisiana * New England	2,179,000	9,525,067	3,677,647
24	Gabon	1,519,000	267,668	103,347
25	Central African Republic	1,435,000	622,984	240,535
26	Burundi	1,074,000	25,680	9,915
27	Mauritius	926,000	2,040	788
28	Réunion	799,000	2,511	970
29	Rwanda	793,000	26,338	10,169
30	Vietnam	693,000	331,340	127,930
31	Mauritania	656,000	1,030,700	397,960
32	Luxembourg	642,000	2,586	998
33	Djibouti	508,000	23,200	8,960
34	Cambodia	463,000	181,035	69,898
35	Guadeloupe	336,000	1,628	629
36	Martinique	303,000	1,128	436
37	New Caledonia	288,000	18,575	7,172
38	French Polynesia	278,000	4,167	1,609
39	Comoros	237,000	1,861	719
40	Laos	204,000	236,800	91,430
41	French Guiana	195,000	84,000	32,433
42	Mayotte	180,000	374	144
43	Vanuatu	100,000	12,189	4,706
44	Seychelles	53,000	457	176
45	Monaco	39,000	2	0.7
46	Saint Martin	33,000	53	20
47	India * Puducherry	10,000	483	186
48	Wallis and Futuna	9,000	142	55
49	Saint Barthélemy	8,000	20	8
50	Saint Pierre and Miquelon	6,000	230	89
	Total	350,281,000	28,223,185	10,897,033

== See also ==
- List of countries and territories where French is an official language
- Organisation internationale de la Francophonie
- Agence universitaire de la Francophonie
- Francophone literature
- Institut Français
- Alliance française
- French language in Canada, Lebanon, United States, Minnesota, Vietnam, Laos, and Cambodia
- Swiss, Belgian, and African French
- French-based creole languages
- Language geography
- Sprachraum
- Romandy
