= French language in Cambodia =

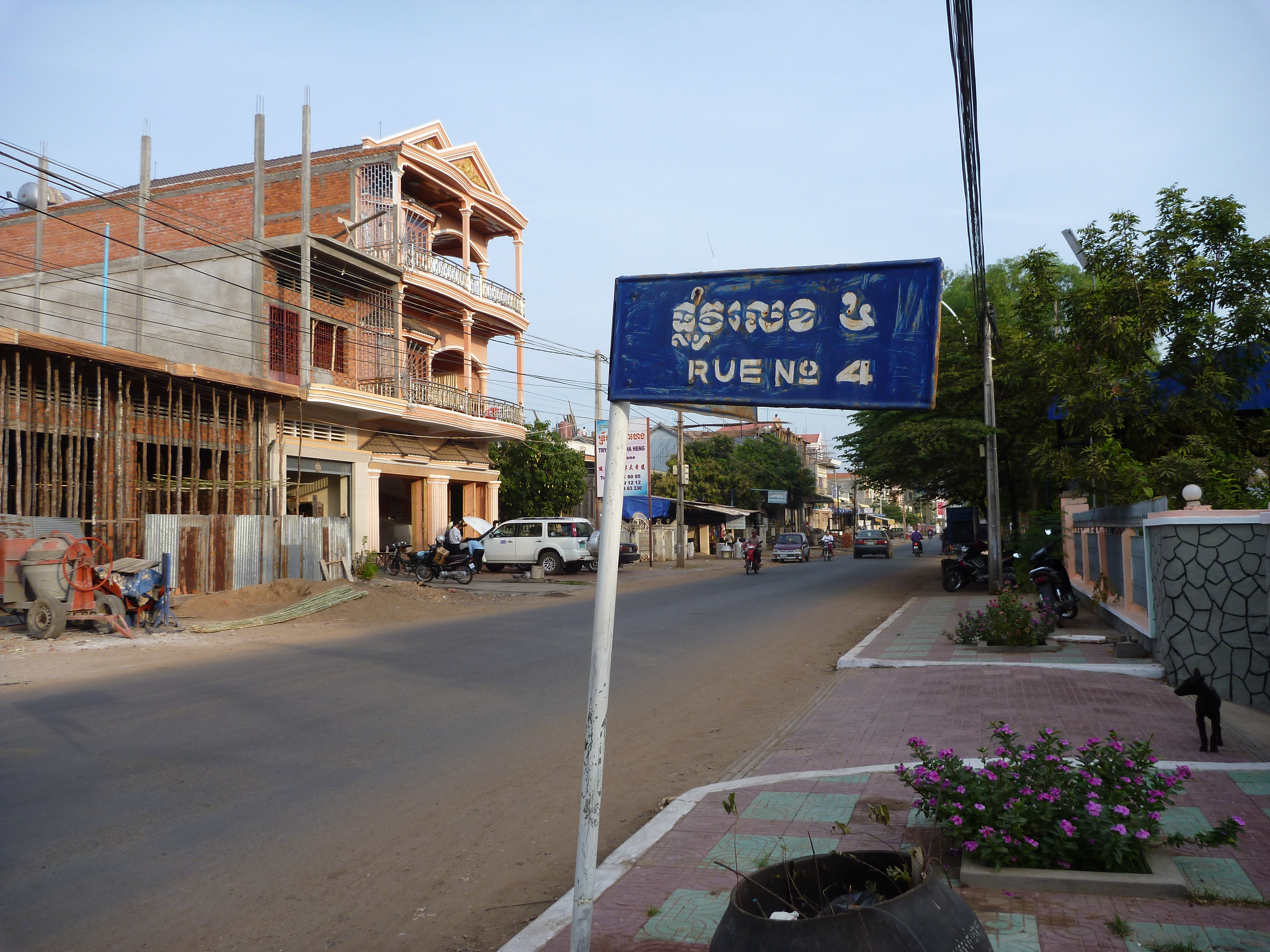
Street sign in Khmer and French in Kratié.

French was an official language of Cambodia for over a century, from the establishment of the French protectorate in the mid-19th century to the start of the Khmer Rouge regime in 1975. Cambodia is the smallest of the three Francophone communities in Southeast Asia, the others being Vietnam and Laos. Out of all Asian Francophone nations, Cambodia is where French has declined the most since the end of the Indochina Wars. Nevertheless, French remains an administrative and cultural language in the country.

In 2022, French was fluently spoken by a little under half a million people, which is about 3% of the country's population, but only by 873 people as a mother tongue according to the country's 2008 census.

== History ==
The French language was introduced to Cambodia in the mid-19th century after French explorers and merchants made their way from Vietnam into Cambodia. In 1863, Cambodia became a protectorate of France and was incorporated into French Indochina in 1887. Unlike Vietnam, the French initially did not exert much influence on Cambodia and Khmer still remained the medium of education in schools, with French being limited to politicians.

After the turn of the 20th century, French began to be widely introduced into Cambodian education, initially being limited to the elite class before spreading to the masses nationwide as the economy grew significantly by the 1920s. This was particularly notable in urban areas, where French usage became widespread in business in addition to education and government. The French language's growth continued until the Japanese invasion of Cambodia in World War II. Under the Japanese, Khmer was also made a government language alongside French and the two were taught alongside in schools. After the war, French again became the sole official language. When Cambodia became independent in 1953, the French language maintained its official status, now alongside Khmer, and continued to be used in education, government, business, and media.

Despite its strong presence in the government and education, French declined much heavier in Cambodia by the end of the conflicts that embroiled Indochina in the mid-1970s than in Vietnam and Laos. After its victory in the Cambodian Civil War in 1975, the Khmer Rouge came to power in Cambodia and began executing thousands of individuals who were educated or formed part of the professional class before the regime's takeover. Members of these groups were overwhelmingly French-speaking, though ironically top Khmer Rouge leaders were often themselves fluent in French or educated in France. By the end of their reign in 1979, French had almost been completely wiped out in Cambodia. Following a Vietnamese invasion of Cambodia that overthrew the Khmer Rouge, the transitional State of Cambodia government established in 1989 reintroduced French into the nation's government as a secondary language in government and education.

After the establishment of the present government of Cambodia in 1993, French was relegated to administrative language status and Khmer became the sole official language and primary language of education. Beginning in the late 1990s, the English language became more widely taught in Cambodia and French stagnated as English was seen as a more useful international language. Revival of the French language has gained ground much later in Cambodia than in Vietnam and Laos. In 1997, a French-language center opened in Phnom Penh and French-language education began to revive in Cambodia and dozens of Cambodian students study abroad each year in France. A handful of higher education institutes established under the current government use French as a medium of instruction and many schools in urban areas have implemented the language as a medium of instruction either solely or alongside Khmer. Communities of returned refugees from France and Quebec as well as students who have studied in Francophone nations have also added to the French-speaking population of Cambodia.

The 20th Sommet de la Francophonie will be held in Cambodia, in November 2026. The summit will mark the transfer of the Francophonie presidency from France to Cambodia. Norodom Monineath, the Queen Mother of Cambodia, authored the foreword to a report emphasizing the significance of the OIF and the Observatoire de la Langue Française. In her remarks, she described Cambodia's role as host of the summit as a distinct honor for both herself and the nation.

== Current status ==
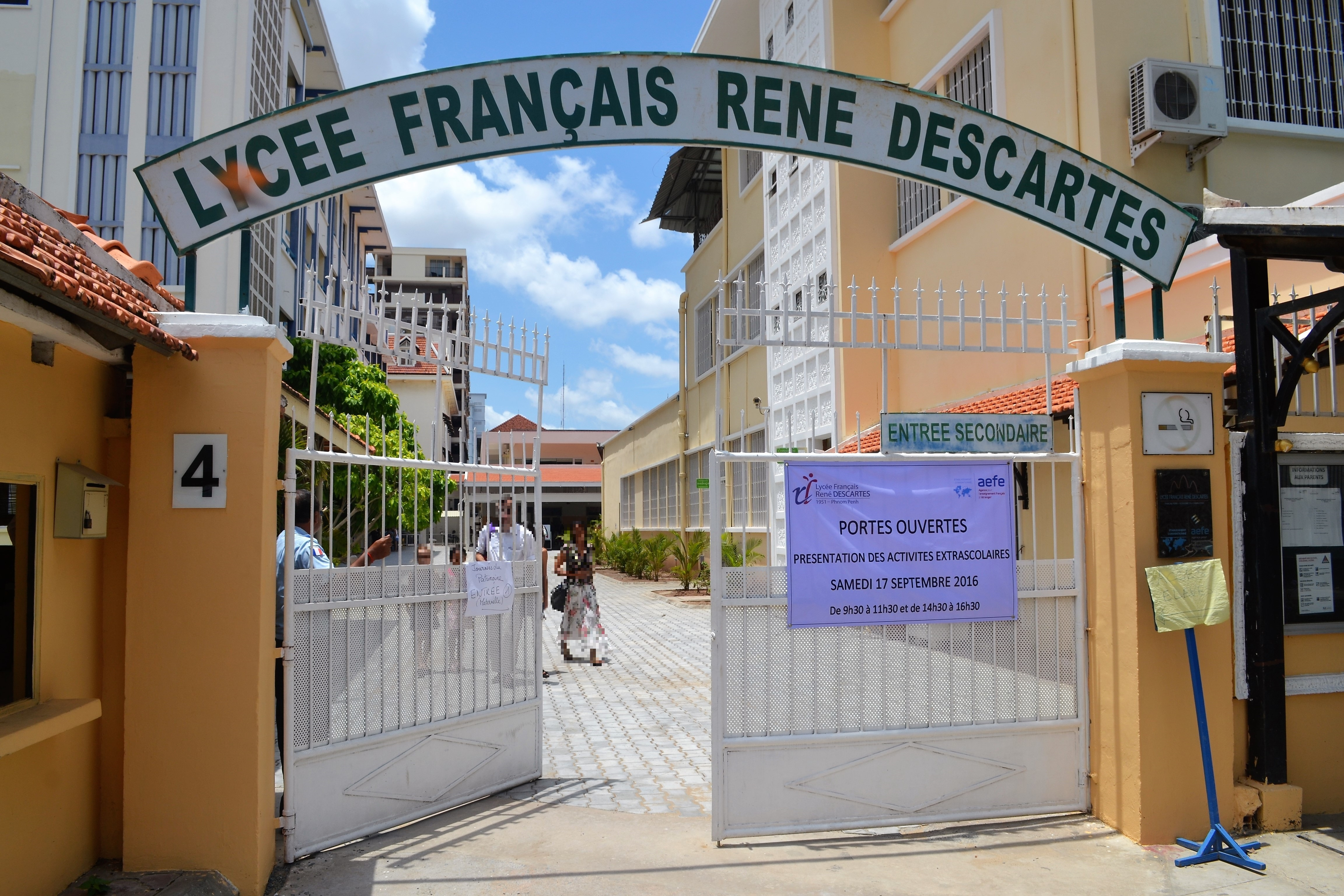

While French lost its official status under the Khmer Rouge regime, it was reimplemented as an administrative language of Cambodia after the regime's downfall. It is a working language alongside the official Khmer in the country's judiciary system and in diplomacy. In particular, many law codes remain exclusively written in French and court proceedings may be conducted in the language. French is also a working language in medicine, although political and education officials have expressed concern with the introduction of English usage in a few medical schools that undermine established standards and quality on the country's health system by adding an additional language for students.

At the establishment of the current government, French-language education was initially limited to schools and universities built or funded by Francophone governments such as those of France or Canada. However, since the first decade of the 2000s, French language education has grown in other government schools. The language is particularly popular among upper and middle class families in urban areas, in part due to historic and cultural reasons, despite increased compulsory English language education.

In 2025, 400,000 students were learning French and around 3,000 schoolchildren were enrolled in bilingual courses across the country and between 7,000 and 8,000 graduate students take French classes as part of training in specialized fields such as medicine or law. The OIF has also promoted the teaching of the French language in Cambodia, notably through its Teacher Mobility Program, which facilitates the placement of French-speaking educators from other countries in Cambodian institutions. The National Center for French Learning was opened in 2025.

The most notable French language school in the country is the Lycée Français René-Descartes in Phnom Penh which has over a thousand students, the majority of which are local. Other organizations promoting the French language in the country include the Institut Français du Cambodge, Alliance Française, and the French Chamber of Commerce in Cambodia.

In 2023, the Cambodian government launched an initiative to strengthen and promote French language education in the country to address decreased proficiency among diplomats and due to the strengthening of ties with other Francophone countries.

== Media ==
French-language media is present in Cambodia, though less so than in Vietnam and Laos. The nation boasts a French-language newspaper, Cambodge Nouveau (and had another, Cambodge Soir, until 2010), as well as French-language television channels. Other French language print media include weekly journals L'Echo du Cambodge and Le Toque.

== Education ==
The following higher education institutions are members of the Agence Universitaire de la Francophonie:

- Institut de Technologie du Cambodge
- National Institute of Education
- Royal University of Agriculture
- Royal University of Fine Arts
- Royal University of Law and Economics
- Royal University of Phnom Penh

== See also ==
- French language in Vietnam
- French language in Laos
- Francophonie
