= The Southeast Asia Weekly =

Weekly newspaper published in Phnom Penh, Cambodia

- Type: Weekly newspaper
- Owner(s): University of Cambodia
- Founded: 2006
- Language: Khmer, English
- Ceased publication: 2014
- Website: http://thesoutheastasiaweekly.com/

The Southeast Asia Weekly (SEA) is a weekly newspaper with articles written in both English language and Khmer language published in Phnom Penh, Cambodia. It got a license in 2006 by the Ministry of Information and changed its name from The Cambodia Weekly to The Southeast Asia Weekly overseen by Dr. Kao Kim Hourn, the President. It is printed in full-color tabloid format. The Southeast Asia Weekly is a not-for-profit newspaper that is affiliated with the University of Cambodia. All the content, views and opinions published pertain strictly to The Southeast Asia Weekly, and in no way reflect the views and policies of The University of Cambodia. The primary focus of The Southeast Asia Weekly is on three main pillars— education, culture and information.

It's said to focus more of their attention towards news related to the entire Southeast Asia region where everyone can get information pertaining to what is going on in their country.
