= Moneaksekar Khmer =

Cambodian newspaper

Moneaksekar Khmer មនសិការខ្មែរ
- Type: Daily newspaper
- Format: Print, online
- Owner: Dam Sith
- Founded: 1994
- Political alignment: Opposition
- Language: Khmer
- Headquarters: Phnom Penh
- Country: Cambodia
- Website: moneaksekarkhmer.com

Moneaksekar Khmer (Khmer: មនសិការខ្មែរ, Mônôsĕkar Khmêr; lit. "Khmer’s Conscience") is a Khmer-language newspaper published in Cambodia with its headquarters in Phnom Penh. It is published by the Sam Rainsy Party.

== Censorship ==
The Moneaksekar Khmer has a long history of conflict with the Cambodian government due to its critical reporting.

In July 2003, a Moneaksekar Khmer reporter was detained for several hours at the Ministry of Interior for sharing a leaked document that originated from the co-minister of interior with another newspaper, which published the document. In August, the Ministry of Information suspended the paper's publication for 30 days after an article allegedly affected national security.

In June 2008, Dam Sith, then the paper's managing editor, was jailed for a week after being accused of disseminating false information by the Minister of Foreign Affairs. In July 2008, the veteran reporter Khim Sambor and his son were killed in central Phnom Penh; he had written numerous article critical of the ruling Cambodian People's Party in the weeks prior to his murder.

In July 2009, the Cambodian government filed a lawsuit against Moneaksekar Khmer, alleging disinformation, defamation, and incitement in reports on government corruption. It received permission to resume publication in January 2010. In December 2013, it was sued again by the Cambodian government, claiming that a November 2013 article defamed the military. At the time, Moneaksekar Khmer was the country's only remaining opposition newspaper.
