= Sralanh Khmer =

- Type: Weekly newspaper
- Language: Khmer
- Headquarters: Phnom Penh, Cambodia

Sralanh Khmer (Khmer: ស្រឡាញ់ខ្មែរ, Srâlănh Khmêr [srɑːlaɲ kʰmae]; lit. "Love Khmer") is a weekly Khmer-language newspaper published in Cambodia with its headquarters in Phnom Penh.

In March 2007, King Norodom Sihanouk announced that they were suing Sralanh Khmer for defamation, claiming the newspaper had distored Cambodian history. After receiving summons, publisher Thach Keth wrote a letter of apology.

== See also ==
- List of newspapers in Cambodia
