= Senghor University =

Private university in Alexandria, Egypt

- Université Senghor جامعة سنجور
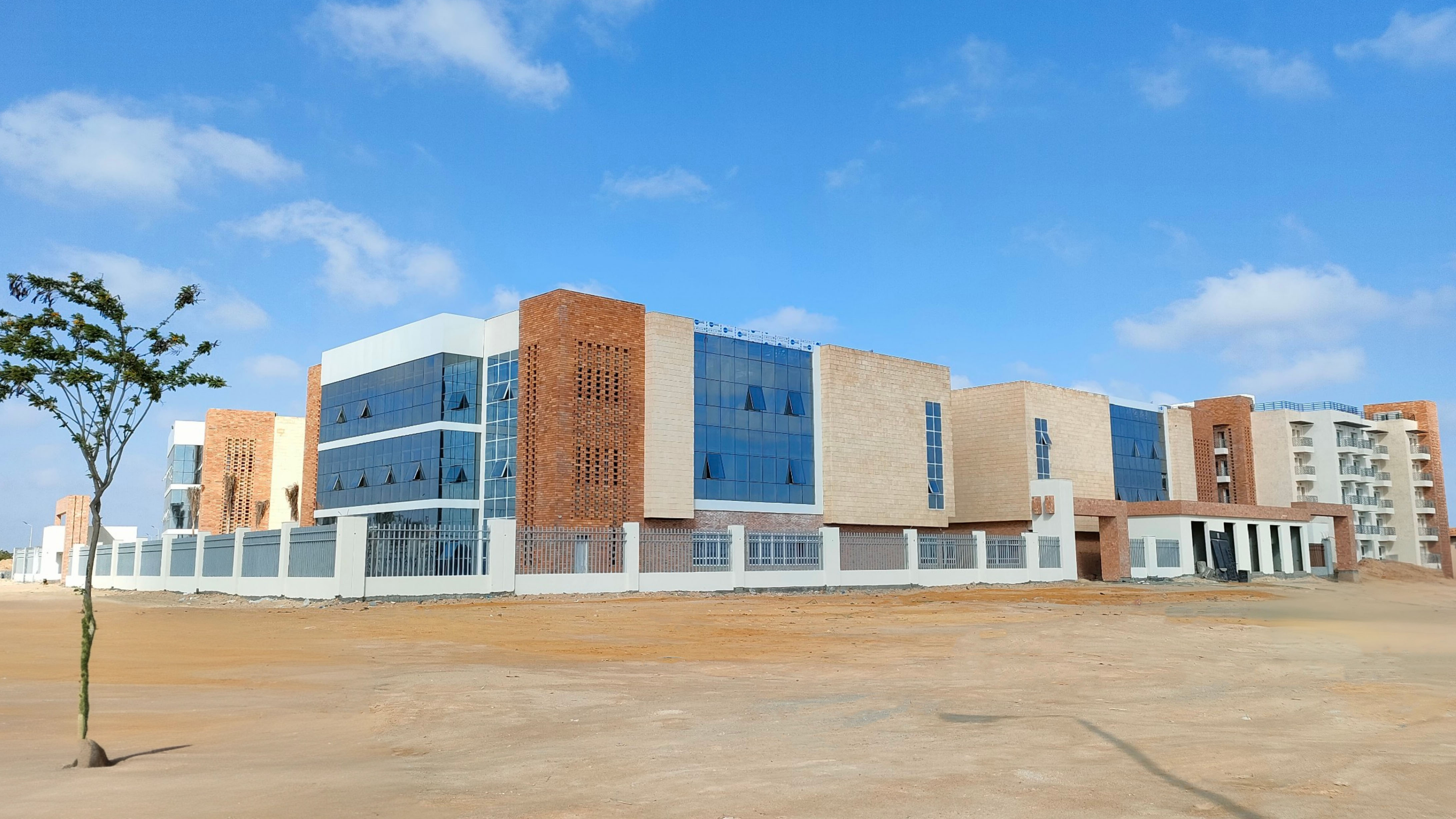
- The new headquarters in New Borg El Arab city
- Type: Private university
- Established: 1990; 36 years ago
- President: Thierry Verdel
- Location: New Borg El Arab, Alexandria Governorate, Egypt
- Language: French
- Website: www.usenghor-francophonie.org/home/
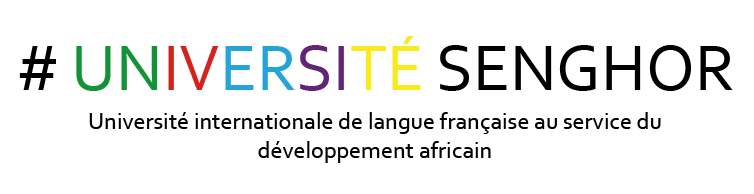

The French-speaking International University for African Development or Senghor University (in French: Université Senghor d'Alexandrie) is a private university in Alexandria, established by decree of the President of the Arab Republic of Egypt No. 272 in May 1989 under an agreement between the Organisation internationale de la Francophonie and the Egyptian government, it officially opened in October 1990. The university was established to resolve development issues In the continent of Africa, and plays a role in training African cadres entrusted with the advancement of various countries of the continent. It is named after the writer and former Senegalese President Leopold Senghor. Its current headquarters is located in Manshiya Square in Alexandria, with ten other branches in Africa and Europe, on establishing its permanent headquarters in New Borg El Arab city, the university grants a master's degree in development in the fields of health, environment, culture, administration, education and administration. The university follows the European Bologna system which is approved by the European Union. The university receives multiple students annually, and the number of the university's graduates since its inception are 2043 students.

== History ==
The establishing of an International French-Speaking University dates back to the early seventies when the former Agency for Cultural and Technical Cooperation - the International Organization of Francophonie now - decided to conduct a preliminary study for the establishment of the Association of French Universities. and protecting African values. In May 1989, a summit conference of heads of state and government of French-speaking countries was held in Dakar, capital of Senegal, during which the project to establish the Francophone University for African Development was presented. Or "Senghor University" in reference to one of the promoters of Francophonie, the former Senegalese president, Leopold Senghor, and that its headquarters should be in Egypt. After that, the agreement to establish the university was signed between the International Organization of Francophones and the Egyptian government, and in the same month, the President of the Arab Republic of Egypt Decision No. 272 was issued For the year 1989 by establishing the university and choosing Alexandria as its headquarters.

In October 1990, the university was officially inaugurated, and Albert Laurdi was appointed president of the university, and studies began in only two departments: administration and health. The environmental department was opened in 1991, then the department of culture in 1993, and global risk and crisis management in 2000. The university has been receiving since Its establishment of only 50 students annually, until 2003 when the number of students received by the university increased to 100 students, then to 150 students in 2009, then 200 students annually in 2013. On June 21, 2016, Terry Vaerdal was appointed president and then director of the university. Afterwards, Hani Helal was appointed president of the university, and on December 3, 2021, the foundation stone was laid for the new and permanent headquarters of the university New Borg El Arab city in Alexandria Governate on an area of 10 acres in the central axis area. The new headquarters consists of the academic building and its future expansions, buildings for housing students and faculty, buildings for sports activities, the library, as well as the building designated for the university administration.

== Objectives ==
Senghor University was established to achieve several goals, including:

- Restore the basic unity of science, the dialogue of cultures, and the protection of African originality and values.
- Contribute to serving sustainable development issues in the African continent.
- Training African cadres in the areas of sustainable urban mobility and the blue economy.
- Integrating the goal of sustainable development in the areas of culture, Ecology, management, and health.
- Design and disseminate public policies on peace and security in Africa and raise awareness of equality between women and men.

== Gallery ==
The new headquarters

The new headquarters

== See also ==
- African French
- French University of Egypt
