= Agence de coopération culturelle et technique =

The Agence de coopération culturelle et technique (ACCT; French for "Agency of Cultural and Technical Cooperation") was founded on 20 March 1970 by the representatives of the 21 states and governments under the influence of African Heads of State, Léopold Sédar Senghor of Senegal, Habib Bourguiba of Tunisia, Hamani Diori of Niger and Prince Norodom Sihanouk of Cambodia.

At its founding, the ACCT's members were: Belgium, Benin, Burundi, Cambodia, Canada, Ivory Coast, France, Gabon, Upper Volta, Luxembourg, Madagascar, Mali, Mauritius, Monaco, Niger, Rwanda, Senegal, Chad, Togo, Tunisia, and South Vietnam. It was the precursor to what is now the Organisation internationale de la Francophonie. Canadian Jean-Louis Roy was the first, and only, secretary-general of the organization from 1989 until 1997.

== See also ==
- Francophonie
