= Marcel Merminod =

Swiss actor

- Born: 16 April 1893; Lausanne, Switzerland
- Died: 31 May 1979 (aged 86); Lausanne, Switzerland
- Occupation: Actor
- Years active: 1930-1970

Marcel Merminod (16 April 1893 – 31 May 1979) was a Swiss film actor. He appeared in 21 films between 1930 and 1970. He starred in the 1970 film Black Out, which was entered into the 20th Berlin International Film Festival.

== Selected filmography ==
- Fire in the Opera House (1930)
- The Son of the White Mountain (1930)
- The Threepenny Opera (1931)
- Princess, At Your Orders! (1931)
- The Four from Bob 13 (1932)
- The Triangle of Fire (1932)
- The Princess's Whim (1934)
- Black Out (1970)
