= Cambodge Soir =

Defunct weekly newspaper published in Cambodia

- Front page of Cambodge Soir, dated 7 July 1997 reporting about feud between co-premier Hun Sen and Norodom Ranariddh which culminated in the 1997 Cambodian coup d'état.
- Type: Weekly newspaper
- Editor: Pierre Gillette
- Founded: 1993; 33 years ago
- Ceased publication: 2010; 16 years ago
- Language: French
- Headquarters: Phnom Penh
- Country: Cambodia
- Website: cambodgesoir.com

Cambodge Soir was a weekly newspaper published in Cambodia and it was the most important French language Cambodian newspaper of the country. It was edited in Phnom Penh and distributed in different Cambodian provinces, among French speaking foreigners and Cambodians. The newspaper closed down in 2010.

== History ==
On September 11, 1993, Éditions du Mékong, a private French-Cambodian corporation, created a bimonthly publication known as Le Mékong.

In May 1995, Le Mékong changed the name to Cambodge Soir Info pop (Cambodian Evening) and only published on Monday, Wednesday and Friday. In July 1997, Cambodge Soir Info started to publish daily.

In March 2007, the internet version of the printing publication was created officially under the same name. That edition, however, stopped publishing in June 2007.

In October 2007, it was reopened under the new name of Cambodge Soir Hebdo and started to publish every Tuesday.

On November 16, 2009, the Cambodian journalist Ung Chansophea won the French Freedom of Press prize for a report he did on mistreated women in Cambodia.

During 2010, the company stopped trading and closed the newspaper and ceased publication.

In June 2011, the H2O Media office was opened at the building.

== See also ==
- List of newspapers in Cambodia
