= French language in Vietnam =

Bilingual French and Vietnamese-language sign found in Nha Trang

French was the official language of Vietnam under French colonial rule from the mid-19th to mid-20th centuries. After the 1954 partition of the country, French fell into disuse in North Vietnam, and maintained a high status in South Vietnam. Since the Fall of Saigon after 1975, French has greatly declined in present-day Vietnam: in 2018, slightly under 1% of the population was fluent in French. However, since the turn of the 21st century, the language has undergone a slight revival, with a growth in number of speakers and institutional use.

Vietnam is the largest Francophone country in Asia and is a member of the Organisation internationale de la Francophonie (OIF). Since the 1990s, the Vietnamese government in cooperation with the French government, has promoted French-language education in the country's schooling system, acknowledging the cultural and historic value of the French language. Most notably, French is the only language besides Vietnamese used as a medium at all grade levels in government schools. The language also continues to be used as a prestige language in certain professional sectors.

== History ==
The French language's presence in Vietnam began in the 18th century when French explorers and merchants began sailing near the Indochina coast. When the French replaced the Portuguese as the primary European power in Southeast Asia in the 1790s by helping to unify Vietnam under the Nguyen Dynasty and later colonizing Southern Vietnam, they introduced the French language to locals. French became the governing language of French Indochina, which included present-day Vietnam, Laos and Cambodia. Many Vietnamese began learning French, which replaced the native Vietnamese and royal court Classical Chinese languages; and eventually the Latin alphabet became the official script of the Vietnamese language. The building of missionary and government schools spread the French language among educated Vietnamese and it soon became the language of the elite classes by the end of the nineteenth century. By the early twentieth century, the French language began spreading to the urban masses and became the primary language of education. A French pidgin called Tây Bồi was developed among Vietnamese servants in French households and those who spoke partial French. Nevertheless, at the French language's height in Vietnam between the 1900s and 1940s, many Vietnamese did not speak French well or learn the language and some revolutionaries refused to learn the colonial language, though ironically speeches and papers written to promote independence were written in French. During World War II, the Empire of Japan briefly occupied Vietnam and established Vietnamese as the sole official and educational language.

The influence of the French language in Vietnam slowly began to decline after World War II as revolutionary movements increased and their works began to be written more in Vietnamese. Poorer and generally more rural populations began to resist French rule and guerrilla forces, the Viet Minh attacked the French and sparked the First Indochina War. The French language, however, continued its presence in government, education and media in areas not held by the Viet Minh. At the Battle of Dien Bien Phu in 1954, the Viet Minh defeated the French and Vietnam gained its independence, though the nation was soon divided into a communist, Soviet-orientated north, and a capitalist, US-orientated government in the south. Fearing persecution by the communist government, hundreds of thousands fled to the south, including French-educated and speaking elite. Despite the Vietnam War erupting shortly afterwards, French continued a healthy presence in South Vietnam, where it was an administrative and educational language. The sharpest decline of the French language in Vietnam was after the Fall of Saigon in 1975 as the communist government imposed Vietnamese as the sole official and educational language on the entire nation, including the south, which was in a transitional phase until 1976.

The number of students receiving their education in French in Vietnam declined to about 40% by the 1980s and continued to decline well into the 1990s. Additionally, many French-speakers who were anti-communist fled Vietnam and migrated to nations such as the United States, France, Canada (most particularly Quebec and Ontario) and Australia. As of 2000, only about 5% of students received their education in French. Meanwhile, the rise of the English language caused a further decline in the status of French in Vietnam as English became seen as the language of international trade, commerce and diplomacy. While English has displaced French as the most studied first foreign language since the 2000s, French language education has been on the rise. By 2022, it had become the primary foreign language course at schools in over half of the country's provinces.

Citing historic, sociopolitical, and cultural contexts, the Vietnamese government has implemented projects to promote or reintegrate French into education systems as a foreign language, especially at the secondary and higher levels. In 1994, with the assistance of the French government, Vietnam implemented a bilingual education track in which students are taught in both French and Vietnamese from primary school onwards. While initially found only at more prestigious government-funded schools in urban areas such as Hanoi, Ho Chi Minh City, and Cần Thơ, by 2017, nearly 400 public schools offered the program to students. Many university programs in engineering, science, medicine, and law remain taught in French. Teacher training programs to enhance the quality of French instruction have been agreed upon with France, Belgium, Canada, and the other Francophone Asian countries of Laos and Cambodia. Vietnam has also become a destination for students from other parts of Asia to come and study French. The nation remains a member of La Francophonie. Furthermore, French has somewhat of a diplomatic language position in Vietnam.

== Current status ==
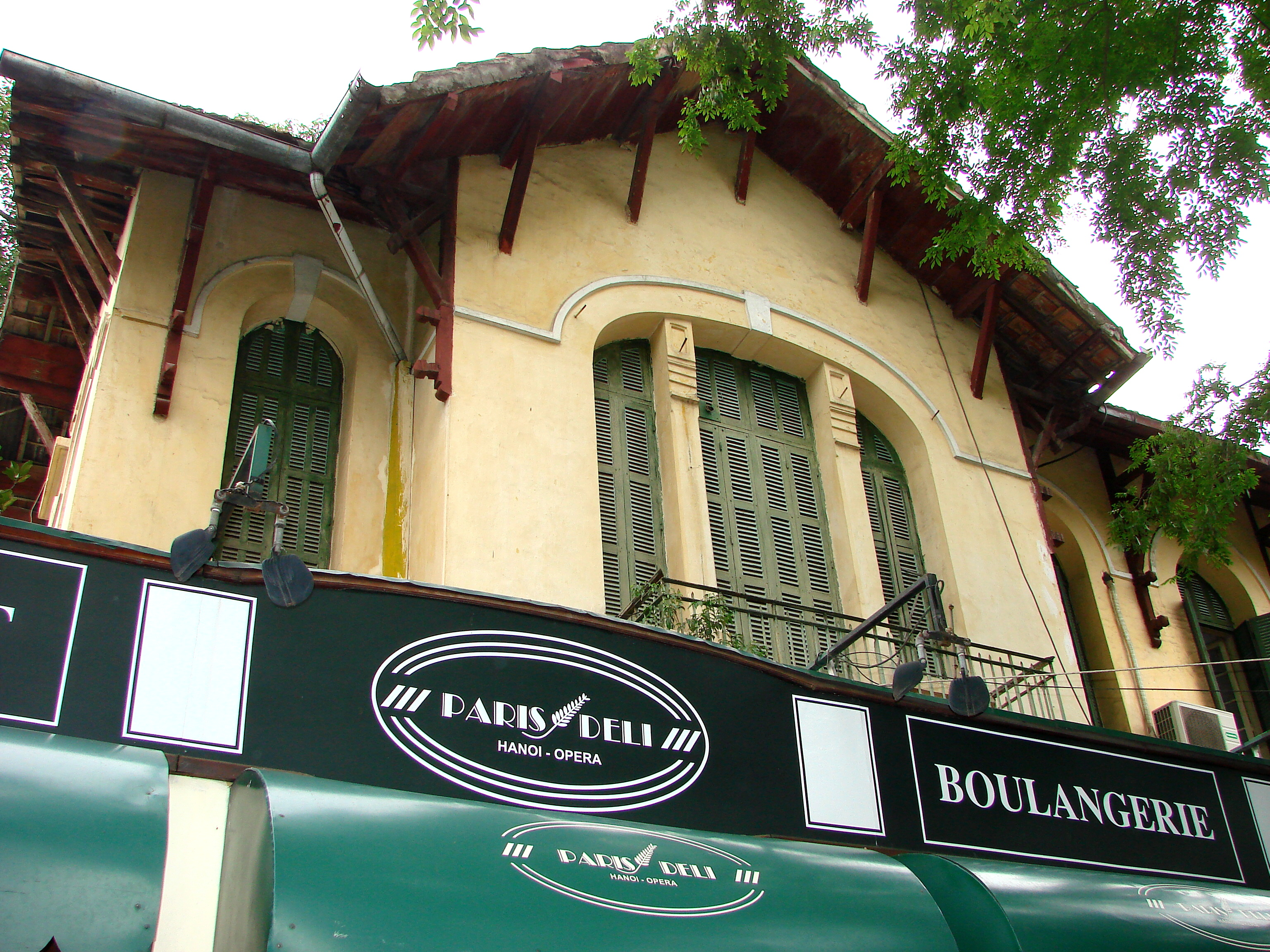
Bakery featuring French-language signage in Hanoi

Official figures in 2019 estimate that about 675,000 Vietnamese are fluent in French, many of whom are older individuals educated during the colonial era. Its usage in everyday life has greatly declined since 1975, however, with the number of people using French on a regular basis being between 5,000 to 6,000. A more recent government estimate in 2026 showed the number of French speakers at approximately 1 million.

French retains a strong influence on Vietnamese education and society despite the rise of English language education facilitated by American-influenced globalization. The number of schools and university programs reimplementing or teaching French has greatly increased since the first decade of the 21st century. This is in large part due to government policies promoting the knowledge of more than one foreign language, with French and English as priority second languages.

French also continues to be regarded as a cultural language in Vietnam, with its usage associated with the elite society and links to family tradition and national history, while English and other foreign languages are regarded as commercial vernaculars used with foreigners. The language also continues to be used as a working language in the medical, scientific, and diplomatic fields.

== Phonology ==
While the French spoken in Vietnam is nearly identical to that of standard Parisian French, local speakers may exhibit substrate interference from Vietnamese. Most notable is the tendency to simplify consonant clusters, which results in them being dissolved to be more similar to the monosyllabic structure of Vietnamese. An example is the word scandale being pronounced as [si kăŋ ɗan] as opposed to standard French [skɑ̃dal].

While absent among native and urban French speakers, vowel elongations are exhibited among more rural speakers, particularly in the Mekong Delta region.

== Influence on Vietnamese ==
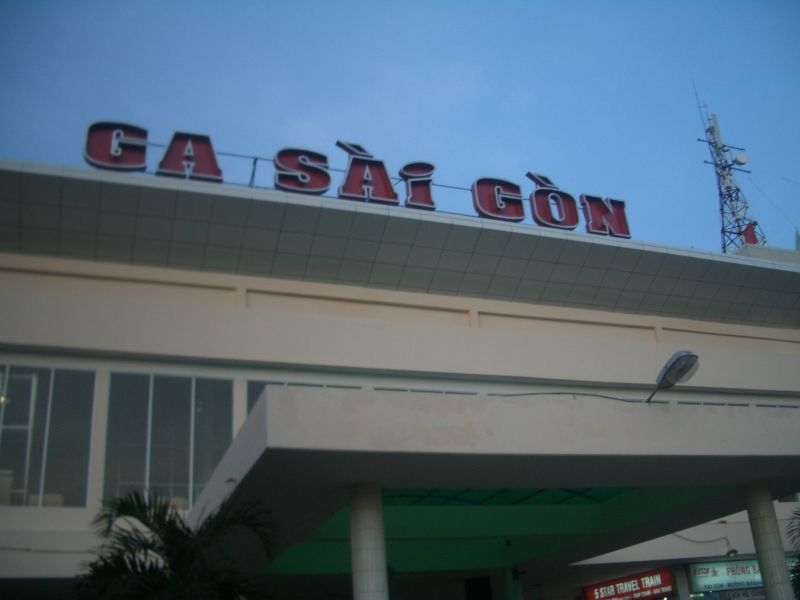
The Saigon Railway Station sign features a loanword from French (ga from gare, meaning railway station).

The Vietnamese language contains a significant number of French loanwords and placenames. The majority of words having French origin are those relating to objects, food and technology introduced to the Vietnamese during the colonial era. Additionally, the Vietnamese alphabet came to be written in a Latin-based script instead of Chữ Hán traditionally used by the former royal court. It became heavily promoted by the French colonial government, which got rid of Chinese influence on the Vietnamese education system by imposing a French-based system.

Below are some notable words that have made their way into standard Vietnamese from French:

Vietnamese	French	English
ăng-ten	antenne	antenna, aerial
ba ton	bâton	cane
bê tông	béton	concrete
bia	bière	beer
bi-da	bille	billiards, Snooker
(bút) bi	(stylo à) bille	ballpoint pen
bơ	beurre	butter
búp bê, búp bế	poupée	doll
cà vạt	cravate	tie
cà phê	café	coffee
ca-pô	capot	hood/bonnet (of a car)
cao su	caoutchouc	rubber
căn tin	cantine	canteen
cặp táp	cartable	schoolbag, satchel
cờ-lê	clé	wrench
ê-kíp	équipe	team
ga	gare	railway station
(bánh) ga tô	gâteau	cake
(cục) gôm / tẩy	gomme	eraser
giuýp	jupe	skirt
(chỉ) len	laine	wool
Li-băng	Liban	Lebanon
ma đam	madame	madam, ma'am, Mrs.
mề đay	médaille	medal
(khăn) mùi xoa	mouchoir	handkerchief
ô tô buýt	autobus	motor bus
(bánh) patê sô	pâté chaud (obsolete)	savoury puff pastry
(cục) pin	pile	battery
(đèn) pha	phare	headlamp
phanh	frein	brake
phẹc-mơ-tuya	fermeture	zipper
(chi) phí	frais	fee
phim	film	movie
pho mát, phô mai	fromage	cheese
(quần) si/xi líp	slip	underwear
(áo) sơ mi	chemise	shirt
sơ ri	cerise	cherry
sô-cô-la	chocolat	chocolate
tăng xông	tension	hypertension
(táo) trái bom	pomme	apple
tuốc-nơ-vít	tournevis	screwdriver
va li	valise	suitcase
va ni	vanille	vanilla
vô lăng	volant	steering wheel
xà lách	salade	lettuce
xa lát	salade	salad
xà phòng, xà bông	savon	soap
xăng, ét-xăng	essence	gasoline
xúc xích	saucisse	sausage

== Media ==
Despite the decline of French in the late 1970s to early 2000s, Vietnam continues to have a French-media market and presence. A small number of French-language newspapers used to circulate in the country, most dominantly the now extinct Saigon Eco and the only remaining state-owned paper, Le Courrier du Vietnam. Additionally, the state-run Vietnam News Agency operates a French edition of its online newspaper VietnamPlus. News broadcasts as well as television programs in French are shown on Vietnamese television channels daily. Radio broadcasts in French are also present.

== See also ==
- French language in Laos
- French language in Cambodia
- French Indochina
- French Cochinchina
- Annam (French protectorate)
- Tonkin (French protectorate)

== Notes and references ==
- Vu Ngu Chieu (February 1986). "The Other Side of the 1945 Vietnamese Revolution: The Empire of Viet-Nam". Journal of Asian Studies. 45 (2).
