= Espace francophone pour la recherche, le développement et l'innovation =

Espace Francophone pour la Recherche, le Développement et l'Innovation
- Flag
- hand cooperation, research and sustainable development, social progress
- Headquarters: Paris, France
- Official languages: French
- Membership: Almost 400 international members living in more than 50 countries 50 research Institute

Leaders
  - Coordinator: University of Paris VIII
- Establishment: 2008

The Espace francophone pour la recherche, le développement et l'innovation, or the Francophone Area for Research, Development and Innovation is an international research consortium strengthening collaboration between North-South researchers and experts founded in 2008.

== Mission ==
The primary mission of EFRARD is strengthening collaboration between north–south researchers and experts in Francophone countries.

- Provide a new model of collaboration and socialization, facilitating interactions with exterior organizations and individuals.
- Break down geographical barriers as well as the institutional and economic impediments to the free flow of knowledge, know-how and technology within communities.
- Reduce the north–south gap through a digital apparatus promoting sharing and cooperation in research and development areas among Francophone countries.

== Members ==
The official list of members is available at the website.

== Grand forum francophone pour la recherche et l'innovation ==
- Annual Strategic Conference

== See also ==
- Agence de coopération culturelle et technique
- Conseil international de la langue française
- French immersion in Canada
- International Francophonie Day

By ISO 639-3 code
Enter an ISO code to find the corresponding language article.
