= Koh Santepheap Daily =

Khmer language daily newspaper published in Cambodia

- Front page of Koh Santepheap Daily, dated 25 July 2023
- Type: Daily newspaper
- Format: Print, online
- Owner(s): Koh Santepheap Media
- Founded: 1967
- Language: Khmer
- Headquarters: Phnom Penh
- Country: Cambodia
- Website: kohsantepheapdaily.com.kh

Koh Santepheap (Khmer: កោះសន្តិភាព, Kaôh Sântĕphéap [kɑh sɑntepʰiəp]; lit. 'Island of Peace') is a Khmer language daily newspaper published in Cambodia with its headquarters in Phnom Penh. According to the Media Ownership Monitor, it is the most widely read paper in the country. It was founded in 1967 by Chou Thany. During the Khmer Rouge, publication was shut down and Thany killed in the Cambodian Genocide. It resumed operation in January 1993, owned by Thong Uy Pang and Yin Phanny, husband and wife who also served as editor-in-chief and manager, respectively. In 1998, Pang was shot while at a temple, blaming a police official." Their daughter, Thong Sovanraingsey, took over management, and in 2005 Pol Saroeun replaced Pang as editor-in-chief. At present, Koh Santepheap is the only medium in Cambodia, which has both online website/app and print version. Koh Santepheap Media now has several digital content project such as 60 Buzz, which provide 60-second news and the most famous online video news program, Facetaste which is the most popular food content provider, "Top Person" online video program which cover all lives of the leader around the world. Home-s-Art is another online video project which cover contents about home design and real estate development.

== See also ==
- List of newspapers in Cambodia
