= Jean-Louis Roy =

Canadian historian, journalist and diplomat (born 1941)

Jean-Louis Roy OQ
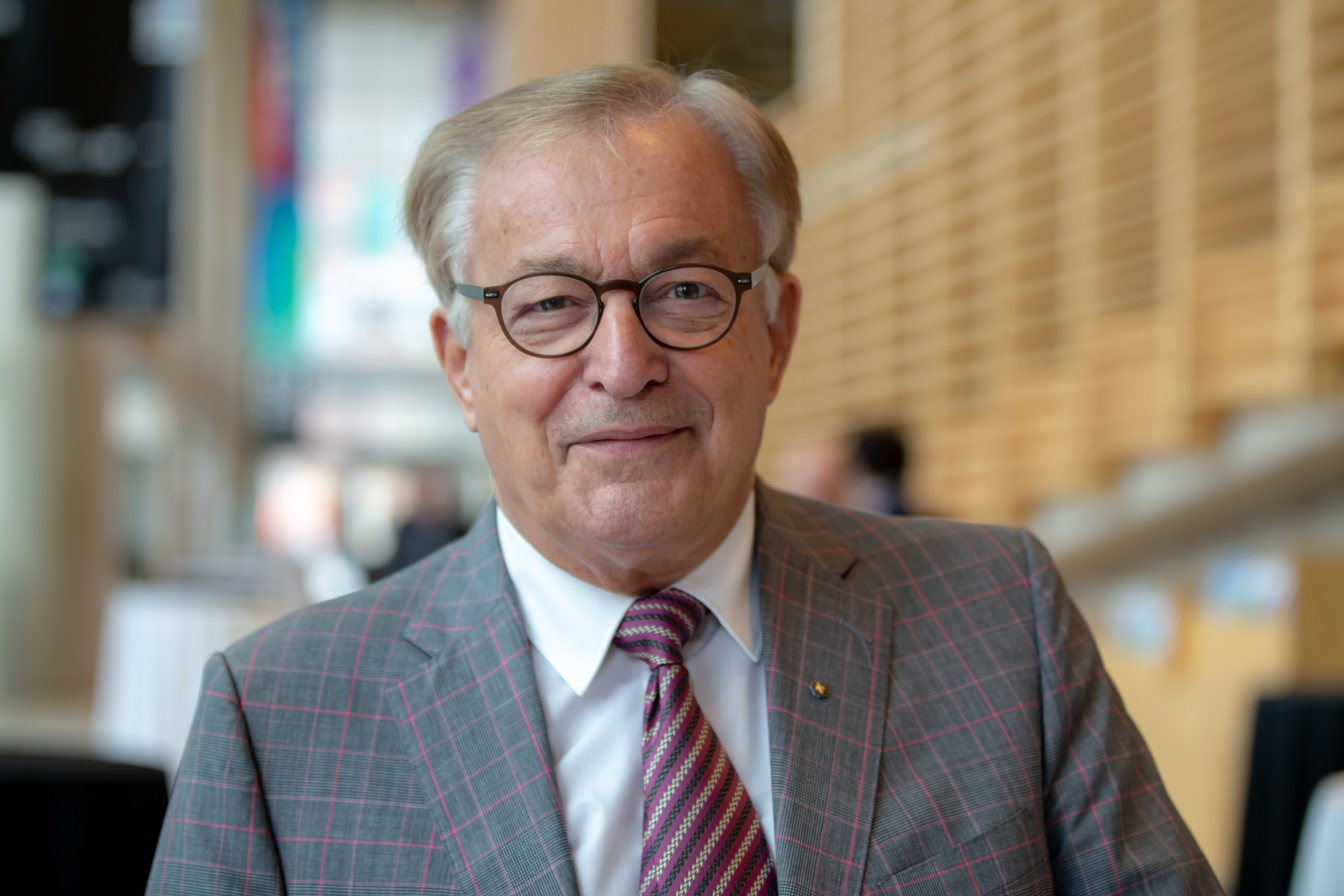
- Born: 1 February 1941 (age 85); Normandin, Quebec, Canada
- Education: Université Laval; Université de Montréal; McGill University
- Occupations: Historian; journalist; diplomat

Jean-Louis Roy OQ (French pronunciation: [ʒɑ̃ lwi ʁwa]; born 1 February 1941 in Normandin, Quebec) is a Canadian historian, journalist and diplomat. He was editor of Le Devoir from 1980 to 1986, the government of Quebec's delegate-general to Paris as well as the province's international delegate for francophone affairs from 1986 to 1989, and the first and only Secretary-General of the Agence de coopération culturelle et technique from 1989 to 1997 when the organization was succeeded by the Agence intergouvernementale de la Francophonie. He was president of the agency Rights & Democracy from 2002 to 2007.

Roy is President of Partenariat International and is a Visiting Researcher at the Centre de recherche en Droit Public de l'Université de Montréal, and president of the Board of Directors for the Centre de la francophonie des Amériques. He was previously director of the Centre for French-Canadian Studies at McGill University from 1971 to 1981.

The Council of Ministers of the Government of Quebec appointed him President and Chief Executive Officer of Bibliothèque et Archives nationales du Québec (BAnQ) on 16 May 2018 in Quebec. He took office on 4 June 2018.
