= French language in Laos =

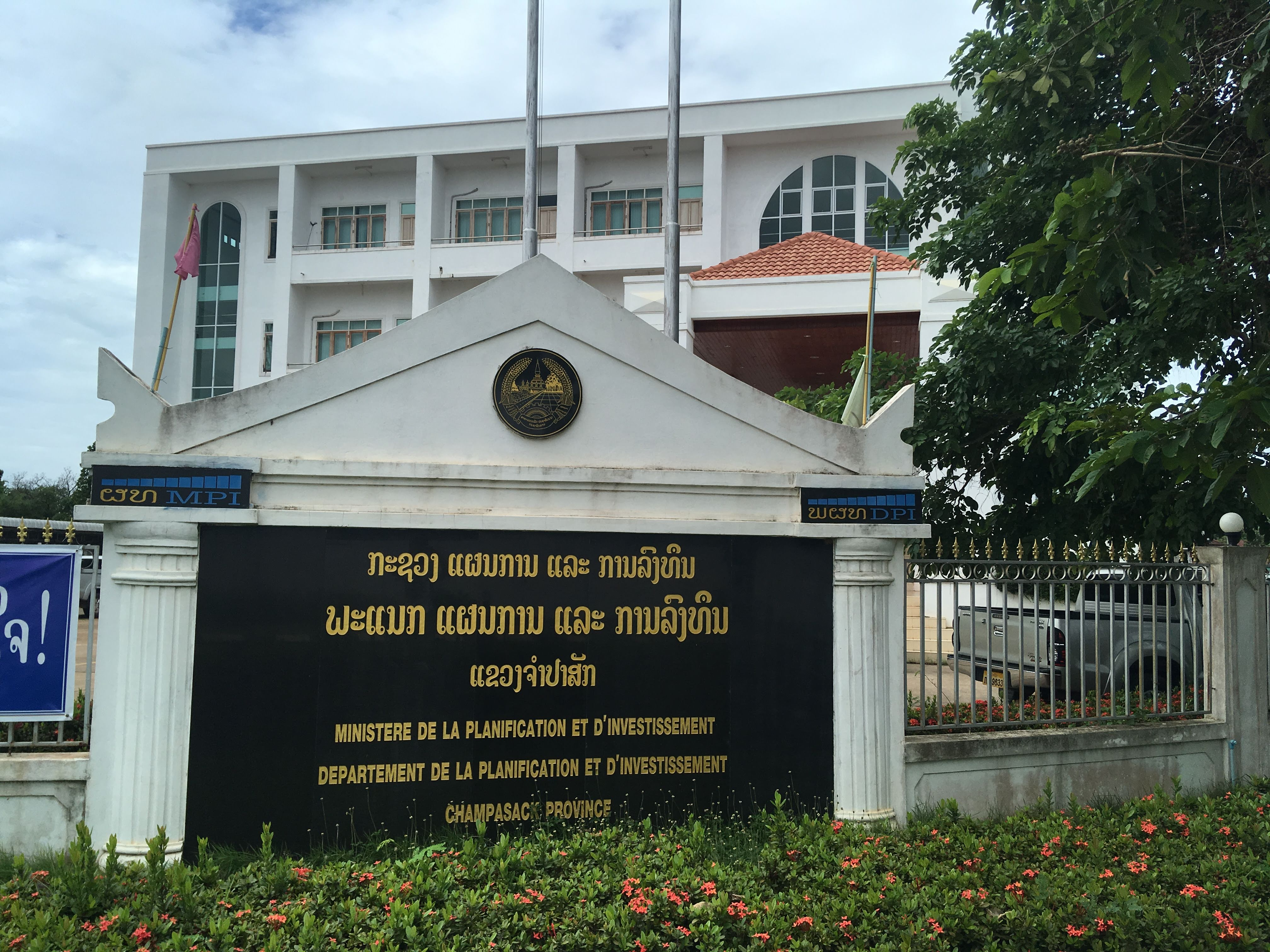
Bilingual Lao-French sign in front of government ministry building in Pakse.

French is an administrative language in Laos. Laos has the second largest Francophone community in Southeast Asia after Vietnam and ahead of Cambodia.

The usage of French stems from the period of French rule over Laos between 1893 and 1953 and was maintained by the later Kingdom of Laos. Its official status was relegated to that of administrative language after the establishment of the current government in 1975.

In addition to its usage in government, French is also widely present in commerce and as a working language in many professional fields, and is studied by over a third of students in Laos. Consequently, the language enjoys a healthier status in Laos compared to other Francophone Southeast Asian countries, although its influence is still under threat from the encroaching use of English as a foreign language.

In 2025, there were approximately 215,000 francophones in Laos. Approximately 75,000 students are learning French as a second language and 3,000 students are in bilingual courses.

== History ==
The French language was introduced to Laos in the 19th century when French explorers arrived in Laos trying to make inroads into China after colonizing Vietnam. A French consulate was established in the Kingdom of Luang Phrabang in 1885, marking the start of Franco-Lao relations. The Lao kingdoms became a French protectorate in 1893 following a request by King Oun Kham after the Haw wars and Franco-Siamese crisis. Unlike in Vietnam, the French did not attempt to fully exert their influence in Laos, and it was not until the first decade of the 20th century that French began to be introduced into schools, but it was mostly limited to Vientiane and Luang Prabang.

As French rule gained firmer ground, French soon became the primary language of government and education and the language spread into southern Laos following the founding of Pakse. The French language peaked between the 1910s and World War II and spread throughout the nation but, like Vietnam, was not widely spoken in most rural areas. French eventually became the language of government officials and the elite. When Japan invaded Laos in World War II, French remained in the educational system, unlike in Vietnam, where Vietnamese became the sole language of education, but the Lao language was briefly used in the government. French returned as the sole political language after France resumed its rule of Laos and was co-official with Lao when Laos was granted self-rule in 1949, as well as after independence in 1953.

The French language's decline in Laos was slower and occurred later than in Vietnam and Cambodia as the monarchy of Laos had close political relations with France. At the eve of the Vietnam War, the Laotian Civil War was beginning as political factions between communist Pathet Lao and the government occurred. Pathet Lao held areas used Lao as their sole language and following the end of the war, French began its sharp decline in Laos. Additionally, many elite and French-educated Lao immigrated to nations such as the United States and France to escape government persecution. With the end of isolationism in the early 1990s however, the French language rebounded, thanks to the establishment of French, Swiss, and Canadian relations and opening of French-language centers in central Laos. Today, French has a healthier status in Laos than the other Francophone nations of Asia and about 35% of all students in Laos receive their education in French, with the language being a required course in many schools. French is also used in public works in central and southern Laos and Luang Prabang and is a language of diplomacy and of the elite classes, higher professions, and elders. However, the English language has continued to threaten the French language as a secondary language in Laos as it is seen as the language of international commerce and some schools have also made English a mandatory subject. Laos is also a member of La Francophonie.

== Current status ==
French remains an administrative language in Laos despite having lost its official status after the communist revolution in 1975. Bilingual public signage most often features French in addition to Lao. It remains the working language in some professional sectors such as medicine, science, and law, being an obligatory language in the latter field. Furthermore, due to chronic limited resources in many government schools and their perceived lower quality, French-medium or bilingual schools have been an attractive option for parents to send their children as the French government either fully or partially funds them, with scholarships offered to high performing students. The Ecole Francophone de Luang Prabang offers French and Lao education.

Official estimates in 2022 placed about three percent of the population as fluent in French, with a higher number of partial speakers.

== Media ==
French language media is the largest non-Lao language media. Lao National Television broadcasts a French-language segment daily. Le Rénovateur is the only French-language print newspaper, with government press publishing online newspapers in the language as well. French-language radio stations are also present.

== Characteristics ==
The French spoken in Laos is based on standard Parisian French but has some minor differences in vocabulary as in other French dialects of Asia. Mixtures of Lao are sometimes added into French, giving it a local flavor. Some Lao words that have found their way into the French language are used in Laos as well. There are some notable differences between Lao and standard French such as:

- The word rue can be used to refer to any street, road, avenue and highway unlike standard French which also uses avenue or boulevard.
- The incorporation of Lao words into French when referring to native Lao topics such as food, plants, etc.

== See also ==
- French language in Vietnam
- French language in Cambodia
- French Laos
