= Ministry of Information (Cambodia) =

Government ministry of Cambodia

- ក្រសួងព័ត៌មាន; Krâsuŏng Poărtâméan

Agency overview
- Formed: 1993
- Jurisdiction: Government of Cambodia
- Headquarters: 62 Monivong Blvd, Phnom Penh, Cambodia
- Minister responsible: Neth Pheaktra, Minister of Information
- Website: information.gov.kh

The Ministry of Information (Khmer: ក្រសួងព័ត៌មាន, UNGEGN: Krâsuŏng Poărtâméan) is the government ministry in charge of media and information in Cambodia. The current Minister of Information is Neth Pheaktra.

== Organization ==
The Ministry consists of:

- General Department of Administration and Finance
- General Department of Information and Broadcasting
- Kampuchea News Agency
- National Television of Kampuchea
- National Radio of Kampuchea
