= L'Écho du Cambodge =

French-language weekly socialist newspaper

- Type: Weekly
- Founded: 1922
- Language: French
- Headquarters: Phnom Penh, Cambodia

L'Écho du Cambodge (Echo of Cambodia) is a French-language weekly socialist newspaper published from Phnom Penh, Cambodia. The newspaper was founded in 1922.

In 1929, there was a Vietnamese-language supplement to the newspaper for a brief period.

In 1937, the director of the newspaper was André Alliès.
