= Rasmei Kampuchea Daily =

Cambodian daily newspaper

Rasmei Kampuchea Daily រស្មីកម្ពុជាប្រចាំថ្ងៃ
- Type: Daily newspaper
- Format: Print, online
- Founder(s): Pen Samitthy
- Editor-in-chief: Teav Sarakmony (last)
- Managing Director: Phlong Chhom
- Founded: 1993
- Language: Khmer
- Ceased publication: December 1, 2023
- Website: http://www.rasmeinews.com/

Rasmei Kampuchea (Khmer: រស្មីកម្ពុជា; "Brightness of Cambodia") was a Cambodian's daily newspaper. The paper was started in 1993. It circulates about 18,000 copies in Khmer. On 1 December 2023 the Rasmei Kampuchea Daily ceased it publication, both in printed and digital format, citing financial problems and digital disruption.
