= Scam centers in Myanmar =

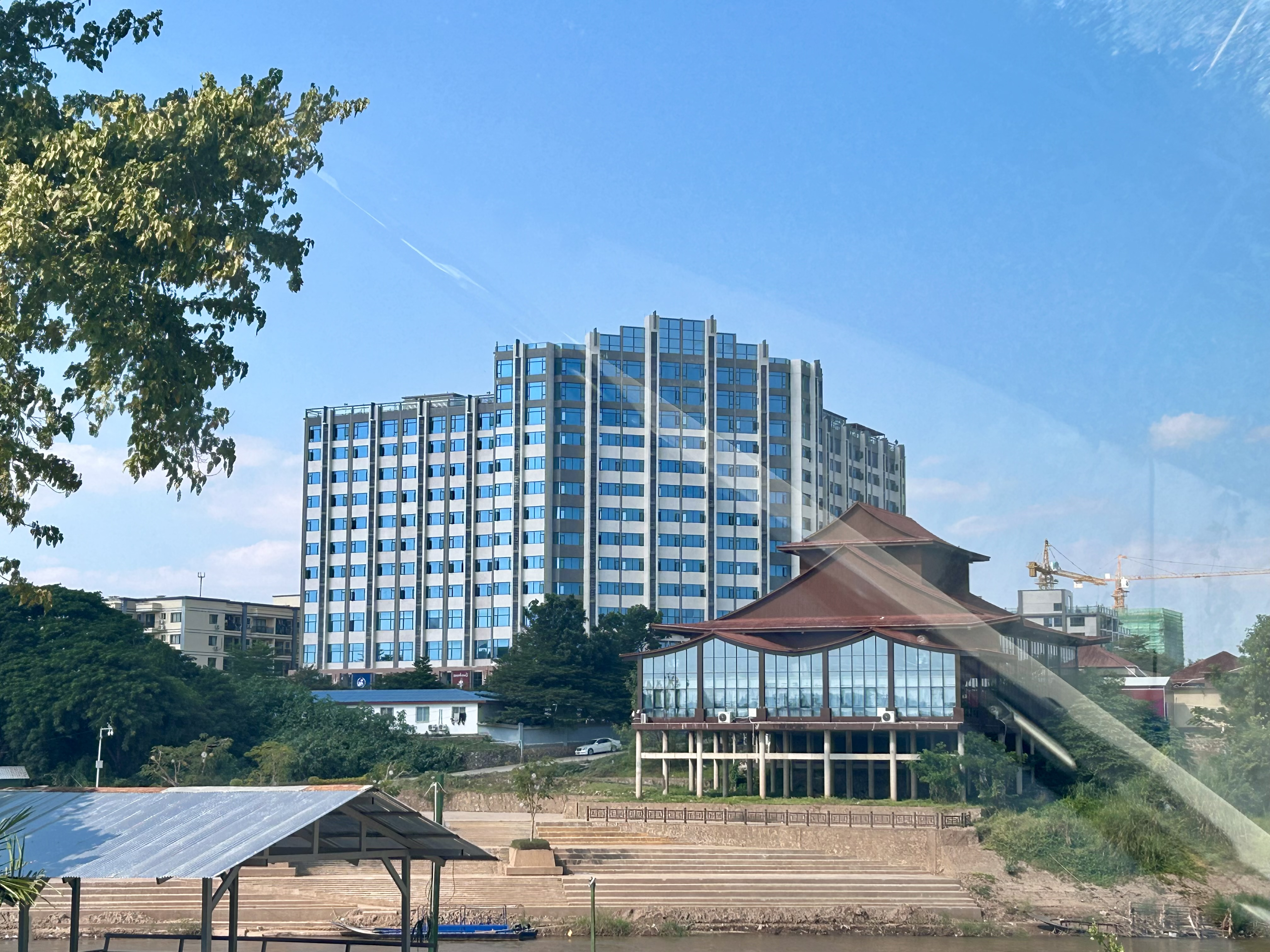
- Major scam center buildings in Shwe Kokko, Myanmar
- Founded: c. 1990s
- Years active: 1990s/2000s–present
- Territory: Myanmar, specifically near Chinese and Thai border
- Activities: Organized crime including: cybercrime, online fraud, human trafficking, child labour, forced labor
- Allies: Transitional crime syndicates, particularly Triads; Pro-government ethnic paramilitary militas and other regional loyalist forces including: the DKBA-5 and KNA; Other scam centers in Southeast Asia

Scam centers are large compounds of fraudulent and criminal activities which are often disguised as business parks or towns around the country being run by international criminal syndicates, often with the support and/or under the protection of largely pro-government ethnic militias and other local border forces. In Myanmar, they are usually located in border towns near Thailand, especially around Myawaddy-Mae Sot and Shwe Kokko.

According to the 2023 United Nations High Commissioner for Human Rights report, an estimated 120,000 people across Myanmar were held in situations where they were forced to engage in online scams. The United Nations Office on Drugs and Crime estimates that these activities bring in nearly US$40 billion a year for criminal gangs.

== History ==
According to the United States Institute of Peace (USIP), the origins of the scam operations in Myanmar date back to loosely regulated casinos and online gambling ventures in the 1990s. These early gambling hubs along the borders became infrastructure for later fraud operations. The operations gathered pace in the 2000s as internet connectivity improved and criminal networks began shifting from gambling profits to online fraud schemes.

Around 2017, the most notable scam center in Shwe Kokko was registered by the Hong Kong-based Yatai International Holdings Group and local armed group partners. The centers shifted from gambling to intensive scam hubs, especially during and after the COVID-19 pandemic. The site began to be repurposed for online scamming, money-laundering, crypto fraud and related activities.

Following the 2021 military coup in Myanmar, the country's civil war created fertile conditions for organized crime, leading to the scam centers becoming hubs for cyber scam and fraud operations. Due to the civil war, local armed groups, militias and border forces sometimes reportedly tolerated scam operations in exchange for revenue or local control.

== Recruitment ==
The scam centers lure basic job-seekers with fake offers of high-paying, legitimate work in digital marketing, IT, customer support or cryptocurrency trading. For such recruitments, advertisements are usually posted on social media platforms, job sites or messaging apps. Victims mostly come from places like China, Southeast Asia, South Asia, Africa and beyond. They are then taken to scam compounds and pressured to work in fraud operations. Once accepted, victims are often transported to border cities like Mae Sot (Thailand) and from there smuggled or guided into Myanmar scam compounds, such as in Myawaddy, Shwe Kokko, or others.

Other nationals recruited to scam centers included those from Ethiopia, Kenya, Indonesia, Malaysia, Philippines, Brazil, Nepal, Vietnam and Thailand.

== Locations ==
Locations were frequently scam centers are held

The main hubs of the scam centers tend to be focused in the following regions.

- Laukkai: Scam operations in Laukkai and the Shan State are mainly located around Myanmar's northern frontier, in towns such as Muse, Lashio, Mong La and Pangkham. The region became a major cyber-scamming hub, run by Chinese syndicates after the 2021 military coup. The United Nations has described Laukkai's evolution to scam centers as a "scamdemic", where over 100,000 people, primarily Chinese nationals, were lured into the compounds, detained and compelled to carry out complex online fraud schemes aimed at victims around the globe. The Ming family, one of the most powerful clans based in Laukkai, ran large call-centre fraud networks, which are estimated to have generated over 10 billion yuan ($1.5 billion+) in revenue. The family patriarch Ming Xuechang reportedly killed himself, with other family members being handed over to the Chinese authorities. Abuse and torture, such as beatings, restriction of movement, long working-hours, trafficking and exploitation was common in the center. In October 2023, a coalition of ethnic armed groups launched Operation 1027 and took over Laukkai which led to many scamming workers fleeing from the region although some were held captive. The Myanmar National Democratic Alliance Army declared its intentions to eliminate cyber-scamming in the territory.
- Myawaddy: The area is a frontier town in Kayin State. It became popular for establishing scam centers, with mainly Chinese nationals being involved as both operators and victims. Since early 2025, more than 5,200 people have been extricated from Myawaddy scam facilities and over 3,500 have been repatriated through Thailand.
  - KK Park
  - Shwe Kokko
- Mong La: Forced online-fraud labor has occurred in around the region. Victims are trafficked into the region and compelled to run cyber scams controlled by criminal syndicates operating in the Golden Triangle.

== Abuse and violence ==
Victims are forced to work long hours, up to 17 hours a day, on scams such as romance fraud, fake investment pitches, crypto scams and online gambling fraud. Food is limited and poor and medical care was nonexistent. Victims have reportedly been tortured physically with beatings and electric shocks when they refuse to work, missed targets or tried to escape. Many nationals from Bangladesh, Nepal and Pakistan were among those tortured, as well as nationals from China, Brazil, Cambodia, Malaysia, Sri Lanka, Indonesia, India, Laos, Ethiopia, Kenya, Uganda, Nigeria and Tanzania. Beatings were done with PVC pipes, ropes, charging cables or sticks, which left serious bruises and injuries on the victims. According to a man from India, 800 people were given only 10 toilets to share.

People who have been able to escape reported psychological distress such as fear, anxiety, nightmares and long-term trauma. Many victims were reported as having suicidal thoughts and deep shame from being forced into illegal acts.

== Crackdown ==
In 2025, the Myanmar military launched multiple high-profile raids on scam sites. KK Park was raided and partially cleared. Satellite terminals were seized, more than 600 buildings were demolished and 2000 people released. In centers around Shwe Kokko, nearly 350 operators and workers were arrested. Over 10,000 foreign nationals alleged to be involved were reportedly detained. The Karen National Union similarly cracked down on scam centers operated by the DKBA-5.

== International reactions and sanctions ==
On September 8, 2025, the United States Office of Foreign Assets Control (OFAC) sanctioned 19 entities and individuals connected to cyber-scam centres in Shwe Kokko and surrounding areas of Myanmar for their roles in fraud, human trafficking and online scams that defrauded Americans and others worldwide. In October 2025, the U.K. and U.S. governments coordinated sanctions on a transnational fraud network in Myanmar and elsewhere.

China has been a major driver against scam centres in Myanmar and played a role in executing operators of these centres, due to the fact that many Chinese citizens have been trafficked or targeted by scams. Thailand has removed electricity and internet access to border regions housing scam centres.

The Myanmar military's raids on scam hubs, mainly KK Park and Shwe Kokko, have been framed as responses to external diplomatic pressure, especially from China and the U.S.

== See also ==
- Scam centers in Cambodia
- Trafficking of Chinese nationals to scam centers abroad
- Philippine offshore gaming operator
- Scam call centers in Ukraine
