= Crime in Myanmar =

Crime is present in various forms in Myanmar (also known as Burma) and is continuous with the activities of many drug trafficking-financed militias in the eastern and western border regions, and with corruption within and challenges to the central government, particularly since the 2021 military coup.

== Crime by type ==
=== Murder ===
In 2012, Burma had a murder rate of 15.2 per 100,000 population. There were a total of 8,044 murders in Burma in 2012. Factors influencing Burma's high murder rate include communal violence and armed conflict.

=== Terrorism ===
Terrorism in Burma primarily consists of anti-government militant activity. Militant separatists in India, such as the United Liberation Front of Assam and the United National Liberation Front, have bases in Burma from which they launch attacks.

=== Corruption ===
Burma is perceived to be one of the world's most corrupt nations. The 2012 Transparency International Corruption Perceptions Index ranked the country at number 171, out of 176 countries in total. The Burmese government has been making an effort to curb corruption in the country, these efforts have proven ineffective, as Myanmar remains 130 out of 180 in the CPI.

=== Crime against foreigners in Burma ===
Crime against foreigners in Burma, although low, is a growing issue; there have been instances of both petty and violent crime in the country. Criminal activity will tend to reflect the activity of associated trafficking gangs in destination countries where present, and be localized to areas known to adventure tourists on the Banana Pancake Trail.

=== Illegal logging ===
Due to the size and scope of Burma's forests, it is difficult for government organisations like Forest Department to regulate logging. There is a high demand for timber from Myanmar's neighbours–notably Thailand and China–who have depleted their forests much more than Myanmar. As a result, numerous illegal logging operations have sprung up near the Thai-Burmese border and in the province of Kachin along the Chinese border. Logs are commonly cut on the Burmese side and then smuggled to processing facilities in China or Thailand.

Lack of regulations has led to unbridled and destructive logging that has caused environmental damage such as soil erosion, river contamination, and increased flooding. In Kachin State, which has some of the largest expanses of relatively untouched forest, illegal logging accounts for up to half of the deforestation. Due to the remoteness of these regions and the international demand for hardwoods, illegal logging is a threat that is hard to address and will probably continue contributing to deforestation. A major problem is that illegal logging is still classified in Myanmar as an environmental matter, and not as a criminal act, making it difficult for the Forest Department to bring a lawsuit against the offenders.

=== Opium and methamphetamine production ===
A world map of the world's primary opium or heroin producers. The Golden Triangle region, which Burma is part of, is pinpointed in this map.

Burma is the world's largest producer of opium and forms part of the Golden Triangle. The opium industry was a monopoly during colonial times and has since been illegally operated by corrupt officials in the Burmese military and rebel fighters, primarily as the basis for heroin manufacture. In 2025, amid ongoing civil war, opium cultivation in the country surged to its highest level in a decade.

Burma is the largest producer of methamphetamine in the world, with the majority of Ya ba found in Thailand produced in Burma, particularly in the Golden Triangle and Northeastern Shan State, which borders Thailand, Laos and China. Burmese-produced ya ba is typically trafficked to Thailand via Laos, before being transported through the northeastern Thai region of Isan.

In 2010, Burma trafficked 1 billion tablets to neighbouring Thailand. In 2009, Chinese authorities seized over 40 million tablets that had been illegally trafficked from Burma. Ethnic militias and rebel groups (in particular the United Wa State Army) are responsible for much of this production; however, the Burmese military units are believed to be heavily involved in the trafficking of the drugs.

The prominence of major drug traffickers have allowed them to penetrate other sectors of the Burmese economy, including the banking, airline, hotel and infrastructure industries. Their investment in infrastructure have allowed them to make more profits, facilitate drug trafficking and money laundering.

=== Prostitution ===
Prostitution in Burma is against the law. Prostitution is a major social issue that particularly affects women and children.

Burma is a major source of prostitutes (an estimate of 20,000–30,000) in Thailand, with the majority of women trafficked taken to Ranong, a location that borders Burma at its south, and Mae Sai, which is located at the eastern tip of Burma. Burmese sex workers also operate in Yunnan, China, particularly the border town of Ruili. The majority of Burmese prostitutes in Thailand are from ethnic minorities.

60% of Burmese prostitutes are under 18 years of age. Burma is also a source country of sex workers and forced laborers in China, Bangladesh, Taiwan, India, Malaysia, Korea, Macau, and Japan. Internal trafficking of women for the purpose of prostitution occurs from rural villages to urban centres, military camps, border towns, and fishing villages.

Women are often lured into prostitution with the promise of legitimate jobs, substantially higher pay, and because their low educational levels makes it difficult for them to find jobs elsewhere. In many instances, such women come from remote regions.

In addition to crimes associated with prostitution, the trafficking of women, largely to China, for forced marriage remains a problem in Burma. Lack of local brides due to China's long standing One Child Policy is believed to fuel this trade.

=== War crimes ===
The United Nations Human Rights Council has requested an investigation into potential human rights violations, or war crimes, in the country.

In 2023, Amnesty International called for an investigation of ongoing war crimes in Myanmar, following the 2021 coup d'état.

== See also ==
- Human trafficking in Myanmar
- Sex trafficking in Myanmar
