= Trafficking of Chinese nationals to scam centers abroad =

Since the 2010s, Chinese nationals have been lured abroad under false pretenses, often with promises of high-paying jobs, only to be forced into participating in fraudulent activities, particularly online scams. These victims are usually moved to locations in Southeast Asia, such as Myanmar, Cambodia, and Laos, where they are forced to work in scam centers, which involve deceiving others through techniques like investment fraud, romance scams, or telephone fraud. In response to this growing issue, the Chinese government has taken steps to rescue its citizens, crack down on the international criminal networks responsible, and strengthen cross-border cooperation with affected countries. Since 2023, Chinese and Myanmar authorities have collaborated to arrest over 57,000 individuals involved in cybercrime.

== Background ==
The online scam industry in Asia began in the 1990s when organized crime in Taiwan pioneered phone fraud and fake lottery operations on the internet. Scam operations, headed by individual crime families, expanded into mainland China, particularly the nearby Fujian province, in the early 2000s. Increased police crackdowns in the 2010s forced criminal networks to move into Southeast Asia, starting in Cambodia and targeting Chinese nationals.

== Overview ==
Criminal networks often recruit individuals under the pretense of legitimate overseas work, such as online customer service, marketing etc., promising high pay, travel and accommodation. Once recruits arrive at locations abroad, often in Southeast Asia, they find themselves instead working in scam centres ("fraud factories") where they are forced to commit online fraud. According to a report by the Overseas Development Institute (ODI), these operations involve "trafficking for forced criminality". Inside these compounds, workers are often restricted of basic freedom: their passports or phones are confiscated, they work long hours and their living conditions resemble forced labour.

These scam centers are held in Southeast Asian countries, particularly border zones or special economic zones in places like Myanmar, Cambodia, Laos, and others. For example, a 2025 report by the U.S.–China Economic and Security Review Commission (USCC) stated that Chinese‑linked criminal networks operate large scale scam centers across Southeast Asia, stealing "tens of billions of dollars annually".

The rise of these operations has been attributed to a convergence of digital opportunity (online fraud, romance scams, investment scams), weak governance in some border regions, the desire of migrants for higher‑paying work, and criminal groups adapting old trafficking models to new cyber‑fraud models. A 2025 article describes how these "fraud factories" grew out of former gambling and casino‑centered operations when travel restrictions during the COVID-19 pandemic forced criminal groups to shift to online fraud. The complexity is increased because the "victims" of recruitment may become perpetrators themselves under duress, complicating law‑enforcement and victim‑identification frameworks. As ODI says that such operations "challenge the existing counter‑trafficking response … the profile of recruits as more highly educated and skilled workers."

== Chinese government response ==
The Chinese Ministry of Public Security and other bodies have acknowledged the problem of Chinese citizens being drawn into overseas telecom and online fraud operations. In January 2025 it publicly stated it would "make every effort to rescue Chinese nationals who have fallen for scam operations" and enforce "crack down on cross‑border criminal gangs".

Measures taken include stronger international law enforcement cooperation and efforts to return victims from countries like Thailand, Myanmar, and Laos. Domestic legal actions include crackdowns and fraud case investigations, punishment for involved Chinese nationals, such as imprisonment and confiscated assets. Public media campaigns and warnings, Chinese state media has published reminders to citizens to avoid "high‑paying jobs abroad" that may disguise fraud operations.

Public awareness of scam centers and their trafficking operations increased in China following the success of the 2023 crime thriller No More Bets, and the kidnapping of Wang Xing in 2025.

== Notable events ==
- In February 2025 more than 1,000 Chinese nationals working in scam centers on the Thailand–Myanmar border were rescued and flown back to China.
- In early 2025, the governments of China and Thailand, led by Xi Jinping and Paetongtarn Shinawatra, publicly pledged joint action to crack down on cross‑border scam operations in Southeast Asia.
- In September 2025, a Chinese court sentenced 39 individuals for their alleged roles in a large‐scale scam and forced‑labour operation based in Myanmar's Kokang region. Eleven were executed while 28 received lengthy prison sentences.
- In October 2025, the military junta of Myanmar conducted raids on a major scam hub in Karen State near the Thai border where they seized satellite internet devices.

== Limitations and challenges ==
Despite the official actions, criminal groups adapt and relocate operations when one site is cracked down.

== See also ==
- Human trafficking in Southeast Asia
