= KK Park =

Fraud factory in Myawaddy, Myanmar

- Fraud factory and human trafficking hub
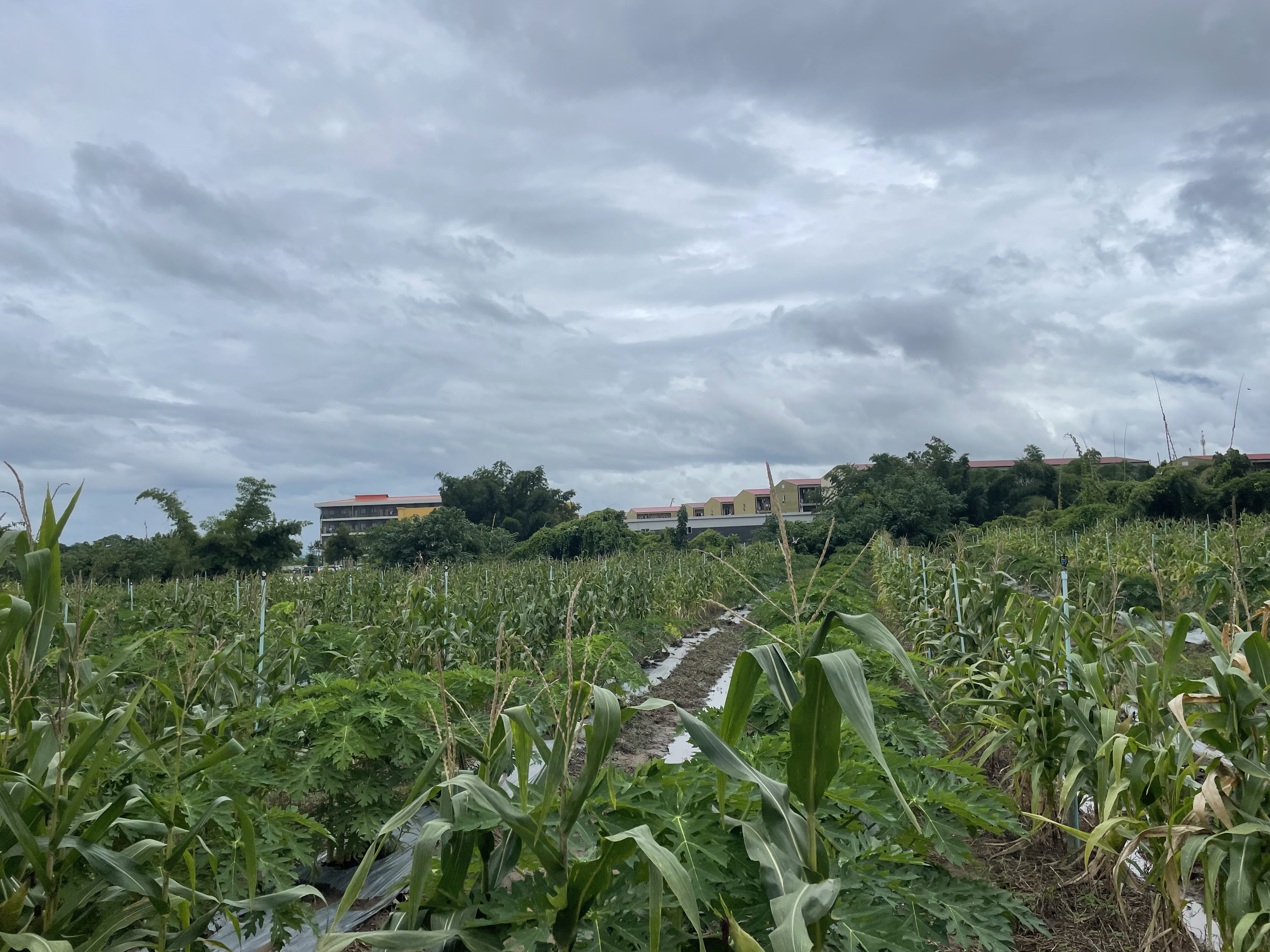

- Location in Myanmar
- Coordinates: 16°38′51.2″N 98°31′14.6″E
- Location: Myawaddy, Kayin State, Myanmar

KK Park (Chinese: KK園區) is a scam centre located in Myawaddy Township, Myanmar. Located next to the Moei River on the Myanmar–Thailand border, the complex is a major hub of cybercrimes, internet fraud, investment frauds, pig butchering scams (a form of catfishing and romance scams usually using cryptocurrency), and human trafficking within the larger Golden Triangle region.

On 21 October 2025, the Myanmar junta's information ministry announced that its force had captured and cleared the park, releasing more than 2,000 workers and confiscating 30 Starlink satellite terminals.

== History ==
The complex was originally designed for border trade purpose, constructed between 2019 and 2021, with additional construction ongoing as of 2023. Dozens of such fraud factories were identified and reported by the media. According to DW, there were at least 12 related scamming sites near the border with Thailand. After the criminal accusation, they also run gambling businesses as a new source of income.

In August 2022, the Myanmar military junta conducted massive sweeps targeting hundreds of internet fraud companies in Myawaddy, forcing these companies to relocate to Yangon. Subsequently, the junta's Border Guard Force stronghold was attacked by militants from Karen National Union (KNU) and its affiliates. KNU is an ethnic armed organization that controls parts of Kayin State. Many KK Park scam operations were suspended during the attack.

On 7 June 2023, Thai authorities announced that they had stopped power supply to KK Park and Shwe Kokko because the Myanmar military junta had not renewed a power supply contract.

On 20 October 2025, Myanmar state media Myanmar Alin reported that the Tatmadaw had conducted a major raid on KK Park, detaining over 2,000 people and seizing over 30 Starlink terminals. Major General Zaw Min Tun, who serves as the deputy minister of information and head of the True News Information Team, alleged that leaders of the Karen National Union, who oppose Tatmadaw rule, were involved in KK Park's cybercrime operations.

After the raid, the junta said in the state newspaper The Global New Light of Myanmar that it had found 148 buildings in the compound, including dormitories, a hospital and a karaoke complex. According to the newspaper, 101 of them had been demolished and work on the other 47 was under way. AFP said it could not immediately verify the claims, but residents on both sides of the border reported hearing intermittent explosions after the raid began.

== Activities ==
The KK Park project is said to be jointly established by the KNU and Chinese companies affiliated with triad leader Wan Kuok-koi, with its name even derived from his initials. The KNU has been under pressure over its alleged involvement in KK Park and other illegal activities, and has faced demands for the resignation of some of its senior members. Former workers identified soldiers of the Myanmar Border Guard Forces as being present in the complex.

Workers from across Southeast Asia have been coerced into performing online scams, including cryptocurrency investment and online casino scams, and enduring torture and unlawful imprisonment and threat of their body being harvested. A 2024 investigation by German state-owned broadcaster Deutsche Welle found that workers at KK Park are subjected to 17-hour workdays and are frequently spied on, tortured, and threatened with murder when attempting to flee the compound. Passports and mobile phones of workers were confiscated to prevent unmonitored communication with the outside world. The complex includes supermarkets, hospital, restaurants and hotels to form a closed community. Illegal organ harvesting was also reported to take place inside KK Park. KK Park victims could only leave by paying a "contract termination" fee which is calculated by the inflated cost of transportation and how much money the victims earned for the scam companies. Victims often had to borrow from family members and friends to pay this fee.

A representative of the USIP stated that there are at least 20,000 scam workers in KK Park and a similar park in Shwe Kokko as of July 2023.

The KNU denied participation by KNU leaders, condemned the acts and said it would investigate the matter. The area where KK Park was built on is a focus region for Chinese government's Belt and Road Initiative, though the Chinese government later distanced itself from the complex following widespread fraud.

A February 2025 Wired report identified KK Park as active and noted that Starlink now played a key role in providing internet connectivity.

== Reactions ==
=== International communities ===
- The Association of Southeast Asian Nations (ASEAN), United Nations Office on Drugs and Crime (UNODC) and China have committed to combat organized crime's illegal casino operations, human trafficking and fraud activities through increasing preventive measures, victim identification and protection, and improving criminal investigation and judicial coordination.
- India: In 2023, the Indian embassy in Yangon requested Myanmar's Ministry of Foreign Affairs for assistance in rescuing and repatriating Indian nationals who were trafficked into KK Park. The Ministry of External Affairs tracked and identified fake job recruitment agents within India. After the raid, India began repatriating 465 of its nationals who had fled into Thailand, most of whom had worked at KK Park. About 270 of them were due to leave in the first batch on two Indian Air Force transport planes. They were among more than 1,500 people from 28 countries who escaped the raid across the border.
- Taiwan: The government dispatched the Aviation Police Bureau to intercept and actively dissuade job seekers at check-in desks who were travelling to Myanmar. In August 2022, police detained three individuals on arrest warrants at Taoyuan International Airport upon their return to Taiwan. Some of these individuals were believed to be core members in the human smuggling group.
- Thailand: The government terminated power supply to KK Park and Shwe Kokko area to dampen the criminal activities in this region.
- United States: The government released a general report about the country's human trafficking and internet scam issues, criticising the junta for negligible efforts in victim protection and prevention, despite stricter anti-trafficking laws and noting that law enforcement and prosecution efforts declined in areas controlled by ethnic armed groups.

== See also ==
- Human trafficking in Myanmar
- Fraud factory
