= Digital arrest scam =

Type of fraud

Digital arrest scam (also referred to as digital house arrest or virtual arrest) is a form of organized cybercrime and fraud in which perpetrators impersonate law-enforcement, government agencies, banks, or courier companies and coerce victims — often by video call or telephone — into transferring money or revealing financial credentials by falsely claiming the victim is under investigation or has been "digitally arrested".

This crime is particularly prevalent in India.

== Procedure ==
In this scam, fraudsters typically contact a victim by telephone, WhatsApp, or other messaging platforms, present fake identity documents (purported FIRs, warrants, official IDs), falsely accusing their victims of conducting illegal activities, then placing them under "digital arrest", and use intimidation tactics (including long video calls and threats of criminal charges) to pressuring victims to send money or provide banking credentials, OTPs or remote-access to devices. Victims are sometimes urged to transfer funds to multiple "safe" accounts or convert funds to cryptocurrency to evade supposed "investigation" or to get charges dropped.

Common elements reported in media investigations include:

- Impersonation of agencies such as the Central Bureau of Investigation (CBI), Reserve Bank of India (RBI), police, customs, or narcotics agencies by persons disguised in uniform.
- Presentation of forged documents and fake FIRs or court orders over video calls.
- Isolation of the victim (keeping them on continuous call) and psychological coercion to obtain immediate transfers.
- Use of large networks of mule accounts, "SIM pipelines" for fake or co-opted SIMs, and multi-layer money-laundering to move and hide stolen funds.
- Typical crimes used in digital arrests include:
  - Improper transfer of money or money laundering
  - Cybercrimes
  - Issues of drug trafficking

== India ==
Digital arrest scams, as per the Ministry of Home Affairs, have caused loss of ₹120.3 crore (US$12 million) to Indian citizens. The scams were mainly discovered being operated from Myanmar, Laos and Cambodia. The National Cybercrime Reporting Portal reported a significant increase in the rise of these incidents from 452,000 complaints in the year 2021 to 740,000 complaints during the first four months of respective years.

Reported incidents include high-value frauds running into crores of rupees and arrests of organised groups alleged to be operating call centres and cross-border pipelines. Examples reported in the press include:

- A case in which a senior citizen in Hyderabad was reported to have lost about ₹1.92 crore (US$200,000); several suspects were arrested.
- A reported ₹58.13 crore (US$6.0 million) fraud investigated by Mumbai cyber-police, with multiple arrests and the discovery of thousands of fake bank accounts used for laundering.
- In March 2025, an elderly couple in Karnataka died by suicide after they were duped of ₹50 lakh (US$57,000) by scammers.
- Multiple cases targeting elderly victims in Pune, Jabalpur, Gurugram and other cities, with individual losses ranging from lakhs to crores.

Indian law-enforcement agencies and courts have taken several measures in response to the surge in these scams:

- The Indian Cyber Crime Coordination Centre was set up by the Ministry of Home Affairs with a Cyber Fraud Mitigation Centre. This centre has representatives of telecommunications companies, banks, financial intermediaries, payment aggregators, local police, etc. so as to enable swift cooperation.
- In late 2025, the Supreme Court of India directed a pan-India probe and asked the CBI to coordinate investigations and work with banks and telecommunications providers to trace and freeze accounts linked to digital-arrest networks; the Court also questioned why advanced tools such as AI/ML were not being used to detect suspicious transactions. Several national news outlets covered the order.

== See also ==
- Cybercrime
  - Fraud
  - Internet fraud
- Scam center
  - Romance scam
  - Pig butchering scam
