= Data diddling =

Alteration of input in a computer system, often for fraud

Data diddling is a type of cybercrime in which data is altered as it is entered into a computer system, most often by a data entry clerk or a computer virus. Computerized processing of the altered data results in a fraudulent benefit. In some cases, the altered data is changed back after processing to conceal the activity. The results can be huge. They might include adjusting financial figures up or down marginally, or it could be more complex and make an entire system unusable.
