= Human trafficking in Myanmar =

Illegal trade of human beings in Myanmar

Human trafficking is a major and complex societal issue in Myanmar, which is both a source and destination for human trafficking. Both major forms of human trafficking, namely forced labor and forced prostitution, are common in the country, affecting men, women, and children. Myanmar's systemic political and economic problems have made the Burmese people particularly vulnerable to trafficking. Men, women, and children who migrate abroad to Thailand, Malaysia, China, Bangladesh, India, and South Korea for work are often trafficked into conditions of forced or bonded labor or commercial sexual exploitation. Economic conditions within Myanmar have led to the increased legal and illegal migration of citizens regionally and internationally, often to destinations as far as the Middle East. The border regions of Myanmar, including Shwe Kokko, are known human trafficking destinations.

As of July 2023, Myanmar remained on the lowest tier (Tier 3) of countries in the US State Department's annual Trafficking in Persons Report.

Myanmar ratified the 2000 UN TIP Protocol in March 2004.

In 2023, the Organised Crime Index gave Myanmar a score of 8.5 out of 10 for human trafficking, noting that Rohingya people in Rakhine were heavily targeted by traffickers.

== Types of trafficking ==
=== Labour trafficking ===
Men are subjected to forced labour in the fishing and construction industries abroad. The military's widespread use of and lack of accountability in forced labour and recruitment of child soldiers was the top causal factor for Myanmar's significant trafficking problem in 2009. Most notably in the area of forced labour, the Government of Myanmar is not complying with the minimum standards for the elimination of trafficking.

==== Forced to commit fraud ====
Myanmar is an emerging destination for international labour trafficking, especially along its border areas. Victims include nationals from around the world, including China, Hong Kong, Malaysia, Taiwan, Thailand, India, the Philippines, African countries and Brazil. Victims are lured by the false promise of high-paying jobs, and are trafficked through major cities like Yangon and Bangkok, and transit points like Mae Sot, Chiang Rai. They are then forced to work in industrial-scale fraud factories located in "special economic zones" along the country's borders such as Shwe Kokko.

In 2023, the UN estimated that 120,000 people were trafficked into the country to work in scam call-centres; in March 2024, more than 43,000 such workers were handed over to the Chinese government. The Ugandan government also repatriated 23 citizens.

Another investigation in 2024 found that up to 3,000 people had been trafficked into border areas to work in casinos; nationalities included Thai, Vietnamese, Malaysian, Cambodian and Ethiopian.

=== Sex trafficking ===
Women of Myanmar who migrate to Thailand, China, and Malaysia for economic opportunities are coerced into prostitution. Some trafficking victims transit through Myanmar from Bangladesh to Malaysia and from China to Thailand and beyond.

Exploiters traffic girls for the purpose of prostitution, and ‘birth trafficking’, particularly for Chinese families. A 2018 study by the Johns Hopkins Bloomberg School of Public Health and the Kachin Women's Association Thailand (KWAT) found that thousands of women and girls were trafficked from Myanmar to China to be forced into marriage and childbirth.

Furthermore, due to the vast number of people living below the national poverty line, many women are forced into illegal prostitution. In some areas, in particular international sex trafficking of women and girls, the Government of Myanmar is making significant efforts.

=== Child soldiers ===
The military of Myanmar engages in the unlawful conscription of child soldiers, and continues to be the main perpetrator of forced labor inside Myanmar. Since independence from Britain in 1948, Myanmar's political situation has been unstable and involved in civil conflicts, which has led to an increase in the recruitment of underage soldiers. In 2002, Human Rights Watch reported in "My Gun was as Tall as Me: Child Soldiers in Burma" that Myanmar was the world's largest recruiter of child soldiers. Not only political instability, but also the country's poverty favour the recruitment of children.

The direct government and military use of forced or mandatory labor remains a widespread and pressing issue, particularly targeting members of ethnic minority groups, such as the Shan people. Military and civilian officials systematically used men, women, and children for forced labor for the development of infrastructure and state-run agricultural and commercial ventures, as well as forced portering for the military. Those living in areas with the highest military presence, including remote border areas predominated by ethnic groups, are most at risk for forced labor. Military and civilian officials subject men, women, and children to forced labor. Men and thousands of boys as young as 10 years old are forcibly recruited (due often to desertions) to serve in the National Army and ethnic armed groups through intimidation, coercion, threats, and violence. Children of the urban poor are at particular risk of involuntary conscription; UN reports indicate that the army has targeted orphans and children on the streets and in railway stations, and young novice monks from monasteries for recruitment. Children are slapped with jail if they do not agree to join the army, and are sometimes physically abused. Children are subjected to forced labor in tea shops, home industries, and agricultural plantations.

In December 2009, the military of Myanmar reported that it dismissed a captain from the military via court martial and sentenced him to one year of imprisonment in a civilian jail for child soldier recruitment - the first ever criminal conviction of a military official involved in child soldier recruitment. In the same case, an additional two privates were sentenced to three months' and one-month military imprisonment, respectively. Myanmar law enforcement officials generally were not able to investigate or prosecute cases of military-perpetrated forced labor or child soldier recruitment absent assent from high-ranking military officers. The government also reported investigating, prosecuting, and convicting some internal trafficking offenders, though there was only one reported criminal prosecution of a member of the National Army for his role in child soldier cases. The government continued to incarcerate six individuals who reported forced labor cases involving the regime to the International Labour Organization (ILO) or were otherwise active in working with the ILO on forced labor issues.

In 2022, it was noted that government forces were still using soldiers.

== Legal actions (2009) ==
The Government of Myanmar reported some progress in law enforcement efforts against cross-border sex trafficking during 2009. Myanmar prohibits sex and labor trafficking through its 2005 Anti-Trafficking in Persons Law, which prescribes criminal penalties that are sufficiently stringent, deterrent and condign with those prescribed for rape. The recruitment of children into the army is a criminal offence under the Myanmar Penal Code Section 374, which could culminate in imprisonment for up to a year, or a fine, or both.

== Protection (2009) ==
The regime did attempt to protect repatriated victims of cross-border sex trafficking to China and Thailand, though it exhibited no discernible efforts to protect victims of internal trafficking and transnational labor trafficking.

In forced labor cases, some victims, notably 17 individuals in Magwe Division, were harassed, detained, or otherwise penalised for making accusations against officials who then pressed them into forced labour.

The government reportedly identified 302 victims, most of whom were victims of forced marriage rather than explicitly trafficking victims, and reportedly assisted an additional 425 victims identified and repatriated by foreign governments in 2009, including 293 from China and 132 from Thailand.

The regime did not identify any male trafficking victims. Victims were sheltered and detained in non-specialised Department of Social Welfare facilities for a mandatory minimum of two weeks, some of which even lingered for months, given that authorities could not find an adult family member to take the victim home.

While in government facilities, victims had access to counseling, though it was often substandard, and had fettered access to social workers. There were no shelter facilities available to male victims of trafficking.

Non-governmental organisations (NGOs) were sometimes allowed access to victims in government shelters, but the regime continued to bar NGOs from operating shelters for trafficking victims.

The regime did not have in place formal victim identification procedures. While the government reported that it did encourage victims to assist in investigations and prosecutions, it did not appear to provide financial support or other assistance to victims as incentives to partake in the prosecution of their traffickers.

The regime liaised with the ILO (International Labour Organisation) on the issue of the military's conscription of children, contributing to the return of 31 children to their families.

In 2009, some children remained serving in the Myanmar Army and in ethnic militias. The government appeared unmoved by the predicament, and had hardly assessed the scope of the problem. The regime did not permit UNICEF access to children who were released through the government's mechanisms for follow-up purposes. Additionally, some child recruits were prosecuted and sentenced for deserting the military and were placed in prison.

== Prevention (2009) ==
Myanmar made only tepid efforts to forestall international human trafficking over the past year, and made few discernible efforts to prevent the more prevalent internal trafficking, particularly forced labour and child conscription by regime officials and ethnic armed groups. The government spearheaded awareness campaigns using billboards, flyers, and videos during the reporting period, with state-run television airing a documentary on human trafficking produced by the MTV EXIT Campaign. The Burmese government reportedly formed three new anti-trafficking units back in 2009, and reported a 40 percent overall increase in spending on prevention efforts. During the reporting period, the government signed Memoranda of Understanding with China and Thailand on trafficking in persons. The regime sustained partnerships with Mekong region governments and the UN in the Coordinated Mekong Ministerial Initiative Against Trafficking (COMMIT), and hosted the COMMIT Senior Officials Meeting in January 2010.

== Corruption ==
The Myanmar regime reported investigating 155 cases of trafficking, prosecuting 410 individuals, and convicting 88 offenders in 2009, an increase from 342 reported prosecutions in 2008; however, these statistics included 12 cases of abduction for adoption, which are not considered “trafficking” by international standards. Additionally, court proceedings are not open and lack due process for defendants. While the Myanmar regime has in the past been known to conflate illegal migration with trafficking, leading to the punishment of consensual emigrants and those who assist them to emigrate, the police reported some efforts to exclude smuggling cases from human trafficking figures during 2009, and improved their transparency in handling cases. Nevertheless, limited capacity and training of the police coupled with a lack of transparency in the justice system make it uncertain whether all trafficking statistics provided by authorities were indeed for trafficking cases.

Corruption and lack of accountability remains pervasive in Myanmar, affecting all aspects of society. Police can be expected to self-limit investigations when well-connected individuals are involved in forced labor cases. Although the government reported four officials prosecuted for involvement in human trafficking in 2009, the government did not release any details of the cases.

== Progress ==
Since the U.S. State Department's Office to Monitor and Combat Trafficking in Persons began publishing the Trafficking in Persons Report in 2001, Myanmar has never advanced above the "Tier 2 Watchlist" rank. In 2017, it was upgraded to Tier 2 Watchlist. In 2018 Myanmar was downgraded back to Tier 3, as the minimum standards for eliminating trafficking were never met and no efforts were made to meet them. However, in stark contrast to 2017, more traffickers have been prosecuted and convicted and more victims identified. Also, as measures against the recruitment and use of child soldiers, more resources have been allotted to raising people's awareness of the issue.

Trafficking in Persons Report rankings
| Year | Ranking |
|---|---|
| 2001 | Tier 3 |
| 2002 | Tier 3 |
| 2003 | Tier 3 |
| 2004 | Tier 3 |
| 2005 | Tier 3 |
| 2006 | Tier 3 |
| 2007 | Tier 3 |
| 2008 | Tier 3 |
| 2009 | Tier 3 |
| 2010 | Tier 3 |
| 2011 | Tier 3 |
| 2012 | Tier 2 Watch List |
| 2013 | Tier 2 Watch List |
| 2014 | Tier 2 Watch List |
| 2015 | Tier 2 Watch List |
| 2016 | Tier 3 |
| 2017 | Tier 2 Watch List |
| 2018 | Tier 3 |
| 2019 | Tier 3 |
| 2020 | Tier 3 |
| 2021 | Tier 3 |
| 2022 | Tier 3 |
| 2023 | Tier 3 |

== Government response to human rights ==
While forced labor is widely considered the severest trafficking problem in Myanmar, authorities reported that most trafficking cases investigated and prosecuted involved women and girls subjected to, or intended to be subjected to, forced marriage or arranged marriage. The Myanmar regime rules arbitrarily and often tyrannically through its unilaterally imposed laws, but rule of law is absent, as is an independent judiciary that would respect trafficking victims’ rights. The State Peace and Development Council (SPDC), Myanmar's military government, has not acknowledged the prevalence of human rights issues within its country, specifically human trafficking. No one has been held accountable for the serious crimes committed by the government security forces. These crimes include forced labor, conscripting underage children, and personal, including sexual violence.

The 2015 Rohingya crisis left thousands of people vulnerable to trafficking.

The 2021 coup has made it more difficult for the government to tackle trafficking and other illegal activities.

== ILO and international cooperation ==
Myanmar law enforcement reported continued cooperation with Chinese counterparts on cross-border trafficking cases, including joint operations, as well as general cooperation with Thai authorities. In 2009, the ILO continued to receive and investigate forced labor complaints; 93 cases were submitted to the Myanmar government for action, an increase from 64 cases in 2008; 54 cases remain open and are awaiting a response from the government. Despite a report of a child labor case involving as many as 100 children on an agricultural plantation near Rangoon, the regime did not report any efforts to investigate the allegation.

Many minors from Myanmar work in Thai border towns, particularly the town of Mae Sai. Drivers who smuggle illegal workers into Thailand go to villages to recruit minors, and then transport them to the border. In one such case found in a survey, a girl was deceived by a driver and sold into prostitution. Between 20,000 and 30,000 women and girls from Myanmar are estimated to be working in the prostitution industry in Thailand. As illegal immigrants, they are often arrested and deported back to Myanmar. In the late 1990s, approximately 50 to 70 percent of the prostitutes were HIV positive.

In other cases, children from Myanmar were tricked during their recruitment and were not paid for the jobs they were promised. It is believed that the children from Myanmar make up the largest sector of foreign working children. Minors also participate in the fishing industry and work in Bangkok, though this is not as common. The ethnic minorities from Myanmar working in Thailand were also found to have the lowest education in all minor workers surveyed, at about 1.3 years, and Burmese were found to have only a slightly higher education level, on average roughly four years. The minors from Myanmar who work in Thailand usually leave for economic reasons.

A lack of job opportunities in Myanmar has contributed to the rise of human trafficking operations; the trade is now no longer targeting just rural areas, but is reaching the country's major cities. Many of the 2.5 million migrants from Myanmar came to Thailand to find low-paying domestic jobs during the militaristic regime previously in place. These migrants often lack basic education and access to social security benefits.

Conversations between the US and Myanmar have been more frequent in recent years. The U.S. Ambassador-at-Large for the Office to Monitor and Combat Trafficking in Persons, Luis CdeBaca, and Myanmar Police Chief Major General Zaw Win concurred in the need for government-civil society partnerships, health care, and prevention. Reports from Washington indicated that the US felt improvements were underway.

== Prosecution of victims ==
Victims of forced labor cases are not protected from countersuit by regime officials. During 2009, 17 complainants and their associates in a series of forced labor cases involving 328 farmers in Magwe Division were prosecuted and imprisoned by local authorities for their role in reporting forced labor committed by local government officials.

Myanmar courts later released 13 of the individuals, but four complainants remain jailed. The central government did not intervene with local authorities to stop the politically motivated harassment, including lengthy interrogations, of the forced labour complainants. Such unaccountable harassment and punishment discouraged additional forced labor complaints.

On February 28, 2014, Myanmar officials decided to ban Doctors Without Borders from the state of Rakhine after the organization discovered and treated 40 victims of violence between Muslim and Buddhist citizens that the government denied took place. The United Nations stipulates that its negotiations with Myanmar to allow Doctors Without Borders into the Rakhine state are of topmost importance, as citizens cannot report human rights abuses for fear of becoming victims of reprisals. For victims of human trafficking, Doctors Without Borders is often the only access to health care.

== See also ==
- KK Park, fraud factory and human trafficking hub located in Myawaddy, Myanmar
- Human rights in Burma
