= Kidnapping of Wang Xing =

2025 kidnapping of Chinese actor

- Location: Myanmar–Thailand border
- Date: January 3, 2025
- Attack type: Kidnapping, forced labour
- Victim: Wang Xing
- Perpetrator: Telecommunications fraud group

On January 3, 2025, Chinese actor Wang Xing (Chinese: 王星; pinyin: Wáng Xīng) was kidnapped by a Myanmar-based fraud group. Wang travelled to Bangkok from Shanghai after being offered a fake acting role, and was transported to Myawaddy. During his captivity, he was forced to undergo training to carry out online fraud in a scam centre.

After Wang's girlfriend, Jiajia (Chinese: 嘉嘉; pinyin: Jiǎjiǎ), reported his disappearance and made a public appeal for help, Chinese and Thai authorities co-launched an investigation into his disappearance. Wang was ultimately found four days later.

The case drew international attention to human trafficking and forced labour in scam centres along the Thai–Myanmar border. It also heightened concerns among Chinese tourists about travel to Thailand, contributing to travel cancellations and the cancellation or postponement of entertainment events. Subsequent investigations led to arrests and the rescue of other trafficking victims. In February 2025, Thai authorities cut electricity, internet services and fuel supplies to several areas of Myanmar associated with scam operations.

In 2025, more than ten suspects were detained in Thailand and deported to China. In August 2026, it was announced that 17 members of a Myanmar-based human trafficking syndicate were being prosecuted in Shanghai, China.

== Background ==
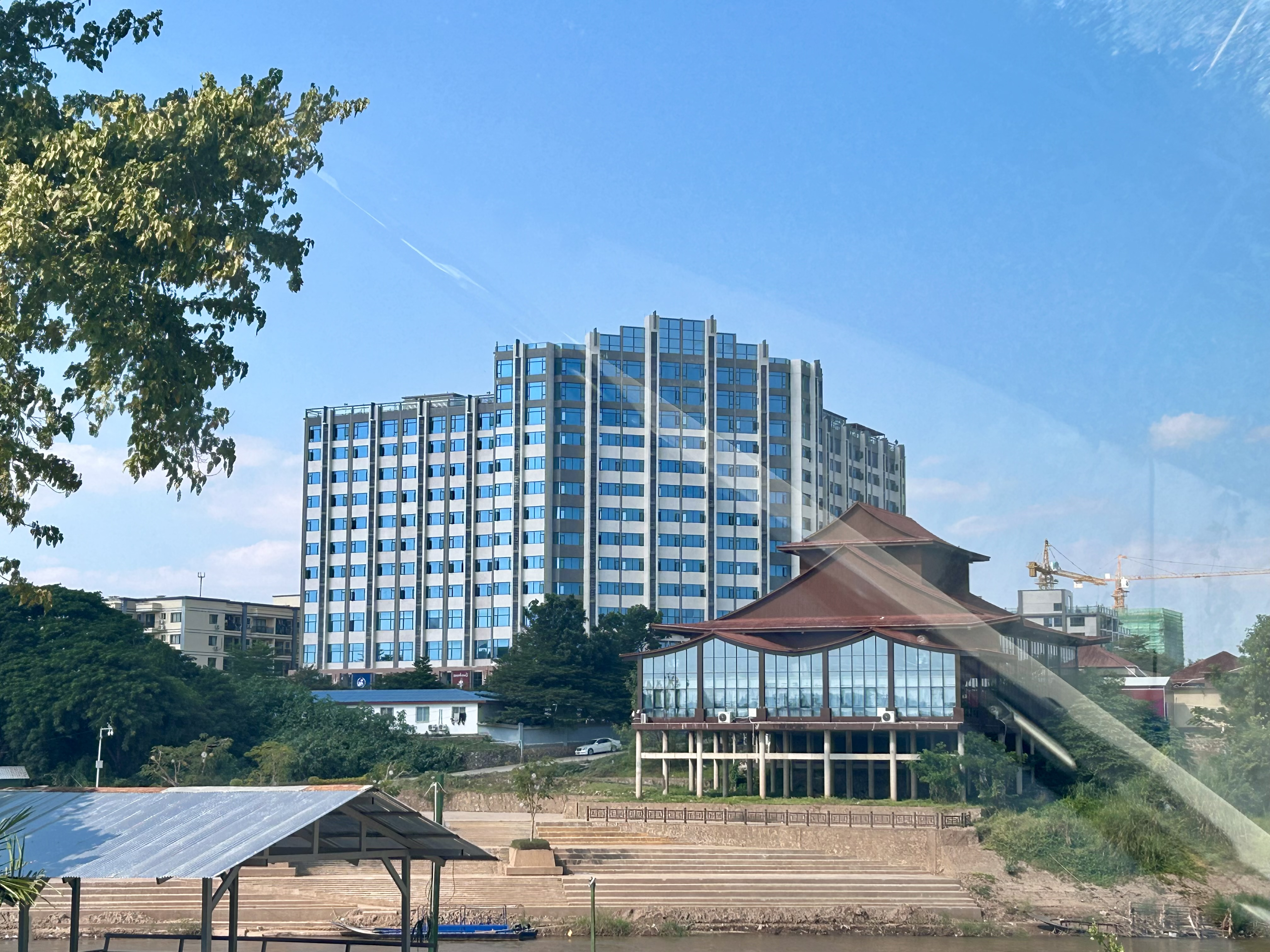
A scam centre in Myanmar

The Myanmar–Thailand border area, including the cities Mae Sot and Myawaddy, has seen increased criminal activity, including cybercrime, in the 2010s and 2020s following the long-running insurgencies in Myanmar. Myawaddy, a border town between the two countries, has specifically become a noted transit hub for human trafficking into Myanmar and other countries. Since the 2021 coup d'état, the volume of scam centres, such as KK Park, has increased, with people trafficked into Myanmar from across the world. According to a January 2025 report by the Civil Society Network for Victim Assistance in Human Trafficking, over 6,000 people from 21 countries are estimated to be held captive and working in scam centres in Myanmar, with the Global Organized Crime Index placing Myanmar first among 193 countries in the world in 2023.

Wang Xing (Chinese: 王星; pinyin: Wáng Xīng, born November 13, 1993), also known by his stage name Xingxing (Chinese: 星星; pinyin: Xīngxīng), is a Chinese actor. Wang graduated from Shanghai University Film Academy and has predominately had minor or supporting acting roles in his career, including in Ip Man 3 (2015), Fox Spirit Matchmaker: Red-Moon Pact (2024), and The Tale of Rose (2024).

== Disappearance and abduction ==
=== Fake casting messages ===
On December 24, 2024, Wang joined a chat group called "Su Nan Professional Actors Group" (蘇南專業演員群) through a friend's introduction. Wang had been actively seeking performance opportunities. In the group chat, an account named "GMMGrrammy 16" posted a message on a possible casting. Wang then connected with someone claiming to be an acting coordinator from GMM Grammy to discuss the role. (Note: GMM Grammy is one of Thailand's major entertainment company. However, it was reported that the company does not employ foreign artists.) GMM Grammy would later issue a statement in Chinese categorically denying any involvement with Wang's abduction. On December 26, Wang's girlfriend, Jiajia (嘉嘉) helped to record an audition tape and he was informed the following day that he had passed the audition. On December 30, due to doubts over the shooting location and details, he initially decided to decline the role but was persuaded by the "acting coordinator" to proceed.

=== Arrival in Thailand and loss of contact ===
At about 9 p.m, January 2, 2025, Wang departed from Shanghai Pudong International Airport, and arrived at Bangkok Suvarnabhumi Airport at around 2 a.m. on January 3. At 3:40 am he boarded a grey Toyota Altis sedan that he was told would transport him to the opening ceremony. The car passed through Chai Nat province, Kamphaeng Phet province, before passing through Tak province's Mae Sot district at 10:34 a.m. Wang had been in communication with Jiajia throughout the journey and was sending her his location details. At about 11 am, contact with Wang was lost with the last location shown to be at the Thai–Myanmar border. Subsequently, Wang was picked up by a grey Toyota Hilux Revo pickup truck.

Subsequent police investigations later revealed that the Toyota Hilux Revo pickup truck was owned by a Thai citizen who confessed to the police that he received instructions from a Karen militia soldier to pick Wang up from a supermarket in Mae Sot district. This truck however did not pass through the border checkpoint at the Thai-Myanmar Friendship Bridge. After being rescued, Wang in an interview stated that he originally thought that this trip was to use Thailand as a transit point to go to a third country for filming, and did not realize that he had entered Myanmar after crossing the Moei River. It was not until he was forcibly taken into another vehicle by armed personnel that he came to that realization.

== Detention in Myanmar ==
Wang was abducted by a telecommunications fraud group to a small-scale fraud park called "Apollo Park". According to Sing Tao Daily's report, the man responsible for the largest human trafficking organisation was in cooperation with the boss of Apollo Park to supply the latter with people lured to work there. The newspaper also quoted from a group chat content stating that they believed that some amongst them had deceived Wang into coming to Thailand. During his kidnapping, Wang was sold three times in four days between the syndicates in Myanmar.

Wang said in an interview post release that he knew there were three buildings in the park: the first building was a gathering place for new abductees, where 10 Chinese people gathered and where Wang was detained before being assigned to the second building; the "second building" was a large training centre where at least 50 Chinese people were imprisoned. During his imprisonment, he was forced to undergo two to three days of fraud training, which mainly involved text fraud and did not touch on voice or telephone fraud techniques. He was deeply afraid of this and worried that if he was not rescued, he would be forced to engage in fraud against Chinese people; and he said there was a "third building" where he would be sent to be forced to work illegally. He said that this building held victims from all over the world. In the park, he was forced to shave his head, and all people who were forced to work in the park had to do the same.

== Search and rescue ==
=== Requests for help from authorities ===
After Wang disappeared at the Thai–Myanmar border on January 3, his girlfriend, Jiajia, reported the case to the Shanghai police at 11:54 a.m, but was told by the Shanghai police that they had no right to take action because Wang had disappeared abroad. Jiajia then contacted the Chinese embassy in Thailand and the Chinese consulate-general in Chiang Mai, but they replied that they needed to confirm whether Wang was still in Thailand and that they needed to file a case in Thailand before they could take action. Jiajia then called the Thai police, but they were unreachable.

Wang's brother Wang Qin also went to two police stations in Shanghai to report the case. However the officers there told him that the case could only be opened after a decision had been made by Shanghai Municipal Public Security Bureau and that the decision would only be made after "a week the earliest, and a month the slowest". The Chinese embassy in Thailand and the Chinese consulate-general in Chiang Mai finally suggested that Jiajia should go directly to Mae Sot district to report the case to the local police.

=== Online help ===
On January 5, Jiajia posted a message on the Chinese social media network, Weibo, asking for help to locate Wang. The disappearance of Wang became viral online and attracted widespread attention in the Chinese film industry. Several notable artists and verified Weibo accounts, including Shu Qi, Yao Chen, Gong Jun, Gina Jin, Dong Chengpeng, Ma Tianyu, and Hu Lianxin posted messages of support, causing the related topic (Chinese: 演員星星在泰緬邊境失聯; lit. 'Actor Xingxing missing at Thai-Myanmar border') to be trending on Weibo. Artists with similar experiences as Wang had also reached out to Wang's family, including Xu Dajiu and Fan Hu. Xu Dajiu (徐大久), a Chinese actor, also narrowly escaped from a similar abduction, and confirmed that Wang would already be in Myawaddy. Another actor, Fan Hu (范虎), who was also in a similar situation, said that the fake crew was very familiar with the entertainment industry and its practices, and came across as professional in their conversational skills. In Fan's experience, after Fan had checked in at a hotel in Bangkok, he contacted the director listed for the work directly who told him that he was being scammed.

=== Rescue ===
On January 6, after arriving in Bangkok, Jiajia immediately went to the Chinese embassy in Thailand and the local police station to report the case, and officially opened an investigation into Wang's disappearance. The case attracted attention from the Thai authorities. That night, Thai television channel Channel 7 released a statement that Wang had been found. However, Tak Province Police Chief Major General Samrit Ekamol claimed in a report that preliminary investigations showed that Wang went to Myanmar voluntarily and was not kidnapped, threatened or forced.

Initial negotiations to secure release of Wang in exchange of money were rebuffed by the crime syndicate who held him, stating that they needed manpower, not money. On January 7, after negotiations between the Thai, Myanmar officials and Karen National Army, Wang was handed over at the Thai-Myanmar Friendship Bridge. According to reports, Karen National Army deputy commander Major Tin Win (Note: Given by Thai sources as Major Maung Win) said that Wang had told him that he was going to Myanmar to visit his relatives in Shwe Kokko.

After crossing the border back into Thailand, with his head shaven and wearing a white shirt and shorts, he was interviewed by authorities at the Tak Province Immigration Checkpoint. During the interview, Wang recounted his experience of being abducted by the scam group to Apollo Park. Lieutenant General Thatchai Pitaneelabutr, Inspector General of the National Police, said that the rescue of Wang was the result of cooperation between China and Thailand. Wang subsequently arrived at Don Mueang International Airport at 7 p.m. the same day, and expressed his thanks to the police in English to the media present. At 10 p.m, he was further processed at the Thailand Victim Identification and Referral Centre in Don Muang.

On January 11, Wang returned to China.

== Investigation and aftermath ==
=== Recruitment methods ===
Southern Weekly reported in January 2025 that more than ten other actors were recently invited to work in Thailand, nine of them via two WeChat accounts connected to people in the entertainment industry. Actors interviewed by the newspaper said recruitment notices circulated in actors’ WeChat groups in December 2024 with varying descriptions of the proposed productions. The users of the accounts claimed to be artist directors or casting coordinators. The newspaper could not confirm if the account holders themselves posted the messages or if overseas organizations were using their accounts. Southern Weekly also noted that people trafficked into scam operations could themselves be forced to recruit additional victims.

=== Arrests and prosecution ===
Apollo Park's boss was eventually captured and held by authorities. On January 17, 2025, the human trafficking criminal group that was luring Chinese with fake job opportunities was being investigated and 12 people in connection to the group had been arrested jointly by Thai and Chinese authorities in their respective jurisdictions. On January 25, a key suspect returned to China following cooperation between China and Thailand authorities. In February 2025, 10 Chinese nationals, in connection to the scam operations, were repatriated from Thailand to China. On August 19, 2026, it was reported that 17 members of a Myanmar-based human trafficking syndicate were charged for luring Chinese citizens overseas and selling them to scam compounds by Shanghai prosecutors. The charges included trafficking women, illegal detention, robbery and kidnapping. It was unclear if the earlier 10 who were repatriated were among these 17. Among their victims was Wang Xing.

=== Other rescues ===
Authorities had turned their attention to other cases after the publicity of this case. On January 10, 2025, two Chinese women were rescued after being abducted on December 27, 2024. On January 17, 2025, it was reported that several other Chinese nationals had been rescued as well. According to HK01, Yang Zeqi's family posted a message for help on Weibo on the evening of January 8, saying that Yang had lost contact at the Thai–Myanmar border since December last year, and his disappearance was highly similar to Wang's disappearance. Yang was subsequently found at the border and returned home on January 17, 2025.

=== Crackdown of scam parks ===
On February 5, the Thai authorities cut the supply of electricity, internet services and fuel to five areas in Myanmar, including areas controlled by Karen National Army and Democratic Karen Benevolent Army (DKBA). Despite the cuts in power supply, some scam parks continued operations with electrical power generators. It was reported that the DKBA would no longer allow scam call operations in the areas they control. By February 13, it was reported that up to 8,000 workers in the scam parks would be deported as they are being forced closed.

Subsequently, UNODC stated that under the regional law enforcement pressures, the operations were being displaced and dispersed into other countries such as Timor-Leste, Pacific Island states, and parts of Africa. Other possible countries include Malaysia, Indonesia, and the Philippines where smaller venues such as apartment blocks, hotels, resorts, and small jungle compounds may be used instead of large scam parks to create a decentralised network for a greater evasion of authorities.

== Impact ==
Although the Thai government said it would properly handle the matter to avoid negative impacts on the tourism industry, Wang's disappearance not only attracted great attention from the Chinese public, but also had an impact on some people who intended to travel to Thailand. Many netizens expressed concerns about the safety of traveling to Thailand, and some even canceled their booked trips to Thailand. As a result of the case, Thai Lion Air reported that 40 chartered flights between Thailand and China would be cancelled during the Lunar New Year holiday period, reducing the number of flights to 200.

Due to the safety issues of Chinese citizens traveling to Thailand caused by Wang's disappearance, Hong Kong singer Eason Chan decided to cancel the Bangkok stop, originally to be held on February 22 at the Impact Arena, of his ongoing Fear and Dreams world tour. Ming Pao reported that several screenshots circulated on Chinese social media platforms were found to be from posts posted by several people who claimed to work in the scam park. These posts revealed that the manager of a scam park planned to arrange for his subordinates to disguise themselves as concert spectators to lure fans who went to Thailand to watch the concert into the scam park. In addition, the plan also included sending male employees disguised as drivers to directly transport fans there. Chinese actor Zhao Benshan's performance on February 22 would also be postponed due to "force majeure and safety concerns".

The kidnapping has brought global media attention to the organised crimes and human trafficking in the region. Victims' families would also appeal for the return of their relatives, with at least 1,500 possible victims details collated in a list. Rising safety concerns have led to an increase in travel cancellations. Thai officials sought to reassure Chinese tourists after the case. In a televised appearance after Wang's return to Thailand, an officer asked him to say in Chinese that Thailand was safe and that he would return.

== Reactions ==
=== Thailand ===
Thai prime minister, Paetongtarn Shinawatra, said the authorities would take appropriate measures to properly handle the matter and ensure that Thailand's tourism industry was not affected.

=== China ===
On January 7, Ministry of Foreign Affairs of China spokesperson, Guo Jiakun pointed out that the Chinese embassies and consulates abroad had received requests for help from the relatives of the parties involved and were in close contact with them. They were actively verifying the situation and carrying out relevant work. China will continue to pay attention to the development of the incident and guide the Chinese embassies and consulates abroad to properly handle the follow-up matters.

On the same day, the Actors Committee of China Federation of Radio and Television Associations also issued a statement on its WeChat public account platform, stating that it had noticed that "many actors were deceived by suspected fraud organizations to go abroad on the pretext of filming TV dramas and other jobs", resulting in their "personal and property safety being greatly damaged".

At a press conference on January 10, Ministry of Public Security spokesperson Zhang Ming stated that China would fully launch international law enforcement cooperation and "relentlessly pursue and crack down on" the strongholds of overseas fraud gangs in order to completely destroy these strongholds and to hunt down fugitives involved in major fraud cases.

On January 11, after Wang returned to China, the Chinese embassy in Thailand published an article reminding Chinese citizens coming to Thailand not to fall for the "high-paying job" trap. It also reminded Chinese citizens entering Thailand that they must apply for the relevant visa in advance if they want to work locally; and that Chinese citizens who enter Thailand without a work visa are not allowed to engage in illegal work or other non-tourism activities in Thailand.

== See also ==
- List of kidnappings
- List of solved missing person cases (2020s)
