= Sex trafficking in Myanmar =

Human Trafficking for Sexual Exploitation and Slavery in Myanmar

Sex trafficking in Myanmar is human trafficking for the purpose of sexual exploitation and slavery that occurs in the Republic of the Union of Myanmar. Myanmar is primarily a source and transit country for sexually trafficked persons.

Sex trafficking victims in the country are from all ethnic groups in Myanmar and foreigners. Myanmar citizens, primarily women and girls, have been trafficked for sexual exploitation to other countries in Asia and beyond. They are forced into prostitution, marriages, and or pregnancies. Victims of sex trafficking are physically and psychologically harmed. They contract sexually transmitted diseases from rapes, and abuse and malnutrition are common. Some women and girls are tortured and or murdered.

Sex trafficking and exploitation is spread throughout all levels of Myanmar society. Male and female perpetrators in Myanmar come from diverse backgrounds. A number of traffickers are members of or facilitated by criminal organizations. Some government officials, troops, and police, as well as foreigners, have been complicit in sex trafficking in Myanmar.

The magnitude of sex trafficking in Myanmar is difficult to know because of the lack reporting and data, the secretive nature of sex trafficking crimes, and other factors. The enforcement of sex trafficking laws and investigating and prosecuting of cases have been hindered by conflict, political instability, land confiscation, poor border management, corruption, and indifference. The government of Myanmar has not made significant efforts in reducing sex trafficking. The internal conflict in Myanmar has caused an increase in sex trafficking. Myanmar armed forces operations' in several areas of the country continue to displace many Rohingya and members of other ethnic groups, making them vulnerable to sex trafficking.

== Victims ==
Myanmar women and children are sex trafficked in and out of all the administrative divisions of the country.

Myanmar women and girls are sex trafficked into China, Thailand, Cambodia, Laos, Malaysia, and other countries throughout the world. A number of women are drugged during the ordeal. Victims' documents and passports, if in their possession, are stolen. They are forced in marriages or brothels, and unfree labour in homes or on farms. Many are tied or locked up and abused.

Women who escaped and made it to the Chinese police were often jailed and deported, while their traffickers and buyers remained free. Victims face stigma in their communities and sometimes from their families. Some victims get abducted and sex trafficked again.

== Perpetrators ==
The traffickers are often part of criminal organizations. Some are government officials, military officers and enlisted men, or police. The perpetrators are sometimes the victims' family members or friends.

== Anti-sex trafficking efforts ==
The government has made some efforts in combating sex trafficking, but these are still lacking. Myanmar police are using the country's anti-money laundering law to dismantle the financial network that supports the crime.

== Corruption ==
Corruption and impunity have hindered the country's anti-trafficking efforts. Some police have demanded bribes in order to return victims to their families.

== Government response problems ==
The Myanmar government has been criticized for its response in reducing sex trafficking.

Coordination between police in Myanmar and in China is poor.

== Non-governmental organizations ==
Eden Ministry Myanmar reaches, rescues, and restores sex trafficked victims in the country. It is supported by the United Nations Trust Fund for Victims of Human Trafficking.

Other nongovernmental organizations disseminate anti-sex trafficking pamphlets and social media messages.
