= Rassolov Ilya Mikhailovich =

Russian scientist (born 1975)

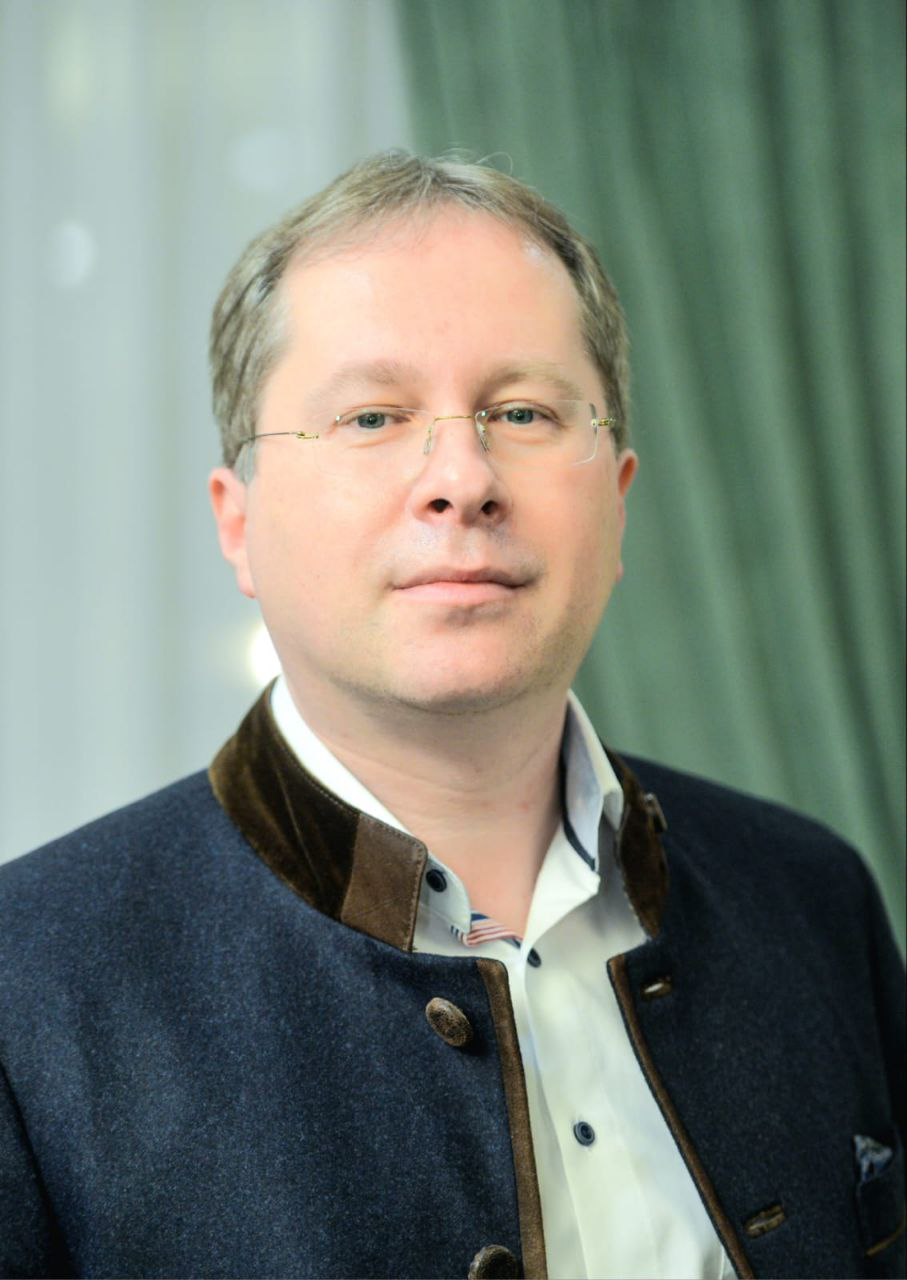
- Born: February 25, 1975 (age 51); Moscow
- Occupations: scientist, writer, lawyer, public figure
- Scientific career
- Fields: Information theory, Information law, Theory of law and management, Information security, Genome, Cosmology

Rassolov Ilya Mikhailovich (Russian: Рaссóлов Илья́ Михáйлович, born 25 February 1975 in Moscow) is a Russian scientist, lawyer, writer, specialist in Information law, PhD in law, and professor.

Author of a new concept of Internet law for Russian legal science (broadly defined as Cyber law).

He has a number of scientific works on Digital law, Cyber law, artificial intelligence, information security and genome.

== Career ==
Rassolov Ilya has held several academic positions throughout his career, including teaching and conducting research in various aspects of information technology law. His work involves examining the legal and technological challenges posed by the digital age, particularly issues related to internet law, information law, and information securitys.

He has also contributed to the academic community by working on issues related to legal informatics and cyber law.

Since 2025 Head of the Department of Information Law and Legal Regulation of Artificial Intelligence at the Russian State University for the Humanities.

== Scientific research and teaching activities ==
Ilya Rassolov is a professor at several Russian and European universities.

From 2009 to 2024 he served as the head of the Department of Information law at several Russian universities.

Author of the first master's program in Russia «IT-Law» at the Kutafin Moscow State Law University.

Ilya Rassolov holds a number of patents for inventions and certificates of intellectual property results.

=== Scientific contributions ===
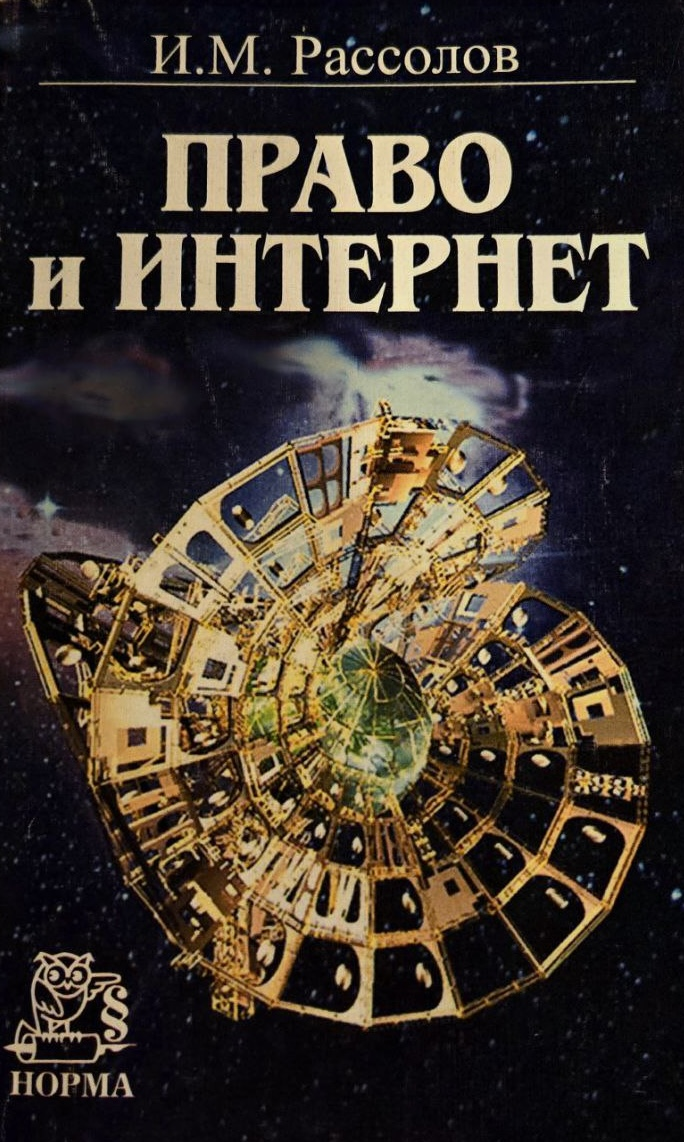
I.M. Rassolov Law and the Internet. Theoretical problems.1st ed. 2003.

Ilya Rassolov is the author of the first concept of Cyberspace law (Internet law) for Russian legal science. He proposed a new approach to the theoretical problems of the interaction between law and cyberspace as social phenomena. Outlined the fundamental principles and conditions for the operation of positive law in cyberspace.

It is in the works of Ilya Rassolov that the concept of «network contracts» (smart contracts) was first examined in detail, and definitions were provided for «soft digital goods», «digital property», «digital footprint», as well as new mechanisms of footprint formation.

The textbook «Information Law» by Ilya Rassolov, published in 2010, was the first to define the subject of Information law (ten types of information relationships).

In 2019–2021, together with associate professor Svetlana Chubukova, they substantiated a new legal institution – the institution of legal support for genetic information
