= Internet fraud =

Fraud or deception using the Internet

Internet fraud is a type of cybercrime fraud or deception which makes use of the Internet and could involve hiding of information or providing incorrect information for the purpose of tricking victims out of money, property, and inheritance. Internet fraud is not a single crime but covers a range of illegal and illicit actions that are committed in cyberspace. Fraud is differentiated from theft since the victim is deceived into voluntarily providing the information, money or property to the perpetrator. Internet fraud is distinguished by the way it involves temporally and spatially separated offenders. Online fraud appears in many forms, ranging from email spam to online scams. Common cybercrimes involving internet fraud including social engineering, phishing, cryptocurrency frauds, and romance scams such as pig butchering scams. Internet fraud prevention efforts include Internet security measures and Internet safety initiatives.

In its 2025 Internet Crime Report, the FBI's Internet Crime Complaint Center (IC3) said it had received 1,008,597 complaints, with reported losses totalling $20.877 billion. In a 2018 study by the Center for Strategic and International Studies (CSIS) and McAfee, cybercrime costs the global economy as much as $600 billion, which translates into 0.8% of global GDP.

== Charity fraud ==
The scammer poses as a charitable organization soliciting donations to help the victims of a natural disaster, terrorist attack (such as the 9/11 attacks), regional conflict, or epidemic. Hurricane Katrina and the 2004 tsunami were popular targets of scammers perpetrating charity scams; other more timeless scam charities purport to be raising money for cancer, AIDS or Ebola virus research, children's orphanages (the scammer pretends to work for the orphanage or a non-profit associated with it), or impersonates charities such as the Red Cross or United Way. In recent years, there have been cases of scams being done by the people who started the charity.

A 2019 example of this was the head of the Long Island Charity, Wafa Abbound. Abbound was found guilty of stealing close to $1 million. She was charged with bank fraud, money laundering, and embezzling. There are many methods scammers will use. First, they will ask for donations, often linking to online news articles to strengthen their story of a funds drive. The scammer's victims believe they are helping a worthy cause. Once sent, the money is gone and the scammer often disappears, though many attempts to keep the scam going by asking for a series of payments. The victim may sometimes find themselves in legal trouble after deducting their supposed donations from their income taxes. United States tax law states that charitable donations are only deductible if made to a qualified non-profit organization.

The scammer may tell the victim their donation is deductible and provide all necessary proof of donation, but the information provided by the scammer is fictional, and if audited, the victim faces stiff penalties as a result of the fraud. Though these scams have some of the highest success rates, especially following a major disaster, and are employed by scammers all over the world, the average loss per victim is less than other fraud schemes. This is because, unlike scams involving a largely expected payoff, the victim is far less likely to borrow money to donate or donate more than they can spare.

== Internet ticket fraud ==
A variation of Internet marketing fraud offers tickets to sought-after events such as concerts, shows, and sports events. The tickets are fake or are never delivered. The proliferation of online ticket agencies and the existence of experienced and dishonest ticket resellers has fueled this kind of fraud. Many such scams are run by British ticket touts, though they may base their operations in other countries.

A prime example was the global 2008 Beijing Olympic Games ticket fraud run by US-registered "Xclusive Leisure and Hospitality", sold through a professionally designed website with the name "Beijing 2008 Ticketing". On 4 August it was reported that more than A$50 million worth of fake tickets had been sold through the website. On 6 August it was reported that the person behind the scam, which was wholly based outside China, was a British ticket tout, Terance Shepherd.

== Online gift card fraud ==
As retailers and other businesses have growing concerns about what they can do about preventing the use of gift cards purchased with stolen credit card numbers, cybercriminals have more recently been focusing on taking advantage of fraudulent gift cards. More specifically, malicious hackers have been trying to obtain information pertinent to gift cards that have been issued but not spent. Some of the methods for stealing gift card data include automated bots that launch brute force attacks on retailer systems which store them.

First, hackers will steal gift card data, check the existing balance through a retailer's online service, and then attempt to use those funds to purchase goods or to resell on a third party website. In cases where gift cards are resold, the attackers will take the remaining balance in cash, which can also be used as a method of money laundering. This harms the customer gift card experience, the retailer's brand perception, and can cost the retailer thousands in revenue. Another way gift card fraud is committed is by stealing a person's credit card information to purchase brand new gift cards.

== Social media and fraud ==
People tend to disclose personal information about themselves (e.g. birthday, e-mail, address, hometown and relationship status) in their social networking profiles. This personally identifiable information can be used by fraudsters to steal users' identities.

The problem of authenticity in online reviews is a long-standing and stubborn one. In one incident in 2004, Amazon's Canadian site accidentally revealed the true identities of thousands of its previously anonymous U.S. book reviewers. One insight the mistake revealed was that many authors were using fake names in order to give their own books favorable reviews. Also, 72% say positive reviews lead them to trust a business more, while 88% say that in "the right circumstances", they trust online reviews as much as personal recommendations.

While scammers are increasingly taking advantage of the power of social media to conduct criminal activity, risk managers and their insurance companies are also finding ways to leverage social media information as a tool to combat insurance fraud. For example, an injured worker was out of work on a worker's compensation claim but played a contact sport on a local semi-professional sports team. Through social media and internet searches, investigators discovered that the worker was listed on the team roster and was playing very well.

A UK woman was scammed in a "romance fraud" online as per the local police. The woman in her 50s reportedly lost her inheritance worth £320,000 taken over from her parents who later disowned her following the loss. The perpetrator met the victim on a dating website in 2019 after she lost her husband. He first took £68,000 in the name of customs fees and then asked her to directly pay £200,000 to his translator to secure his contractors and store his equipment, totalling the money lost to £320,000.

== Counterfeit postal money orders ==
According to the FBI, on April 26, 2005, Tom Zeller Jr. wrote an article in The New York Times regarding a surge in the quantity and quality of the forging of U.S. postal money orders, and its use to commit online fraud. Counterfeiters will conduct these scams through emails or chat rooms. If a person is trying to sell or give away an item of theirs, counterfeiters will make them believe that they are related to auction sites such as eBay. As of right now, there is no way to figure out how much money is being taken through these fake orders, the United States Postal Service believes that it is in the millions. The people who are targeted the most are those who are smaller retailers who operate through the internet or everyday people who sell or pay for items on the web.

Many companies like UPS and Federal Express have started to collaborate with the United States Postal Service to begin surveilling money postal orders. This way they can spot the real from the fake, however this is easier said then done, so they advocate users to be cautious when making a money postal orders. Arrests have taken place, between 2004 and 2005, 160 counterfeiters were arrested. Many of these arrested were caught in the process of cashing in the money they have stolen. In the United States, the penalty for making or using counterfeit postal money orders is up to ten years in jail and/or a $25,000 fine.

== Call forwarding fraud ==
Call forwarding scams involve a fraudster tricking the victim into dialing a specific phone number, which then reroutes all incoming calls and text messages the victim receives to the scammer's device. Scammers in-turn intercept bank messages and OTPs, while the victim remains unaware.

== Purchase fraud ==
Nina Kollars of the Naval War College explains an Internet fraud scheme that she stumbled upon while shopping on eBay.

A fraudster uses the internet to advertise non-existent goods or services. Payment is sent remotely but the goods or services never arrive. The methods these scammers use are they will give these fake products very low prices, they will want to make payments through electronic funds transfers, and they will want to do it right away. Payments will not be conducted through PayPal or credit cards. These services are too secure and will cause issues for the scammers.

=== Subscription traps ===
A form of internet fraud in which users, while providing personal and payment details to access a service (such as credit matching), are unknowingly enrolled into a recurring paid subscription.

In Kazakhstan, this model has been used by a number of online platforms presenting themselves as credit brokers. After a bank card is linked, regular charges are made for "informational services," although no actual financial assistance is provided.

== See also ==
- Advance-fee scam
- Business logic abuse
- Carding (fraud)
- Credit card fraud
- Digital arrest scam
- Email fraud
- Employment scams
- FBI
- Forex scam
- Fraud
- Hijacked journals
- Mail and wire fraud
- Online pharmacy
- Pharming
- Pig butchering scam
- Romance scam
- Scam center
- Sick baby hoax
- Chinese Scam Victims Abroad

== Sources ==
- Legend, Therza (1 January 2018). "CYBER FRAUD: How to be aware, to protect yourself and your business". Podiatry Review. 75 (1): 32–34. Gale A524380313.
- Lin, Kan-Min (September 2016). "Understanding undergraduates' problems from determinants of Facebook continuance intention". Behaviour & Information Technology. 35 (9): 693–705. doi:10.1080/0144929X.2016.1177114. S2CID 5975706.
