= Scam center =

Human trafficking and fraud enterprises

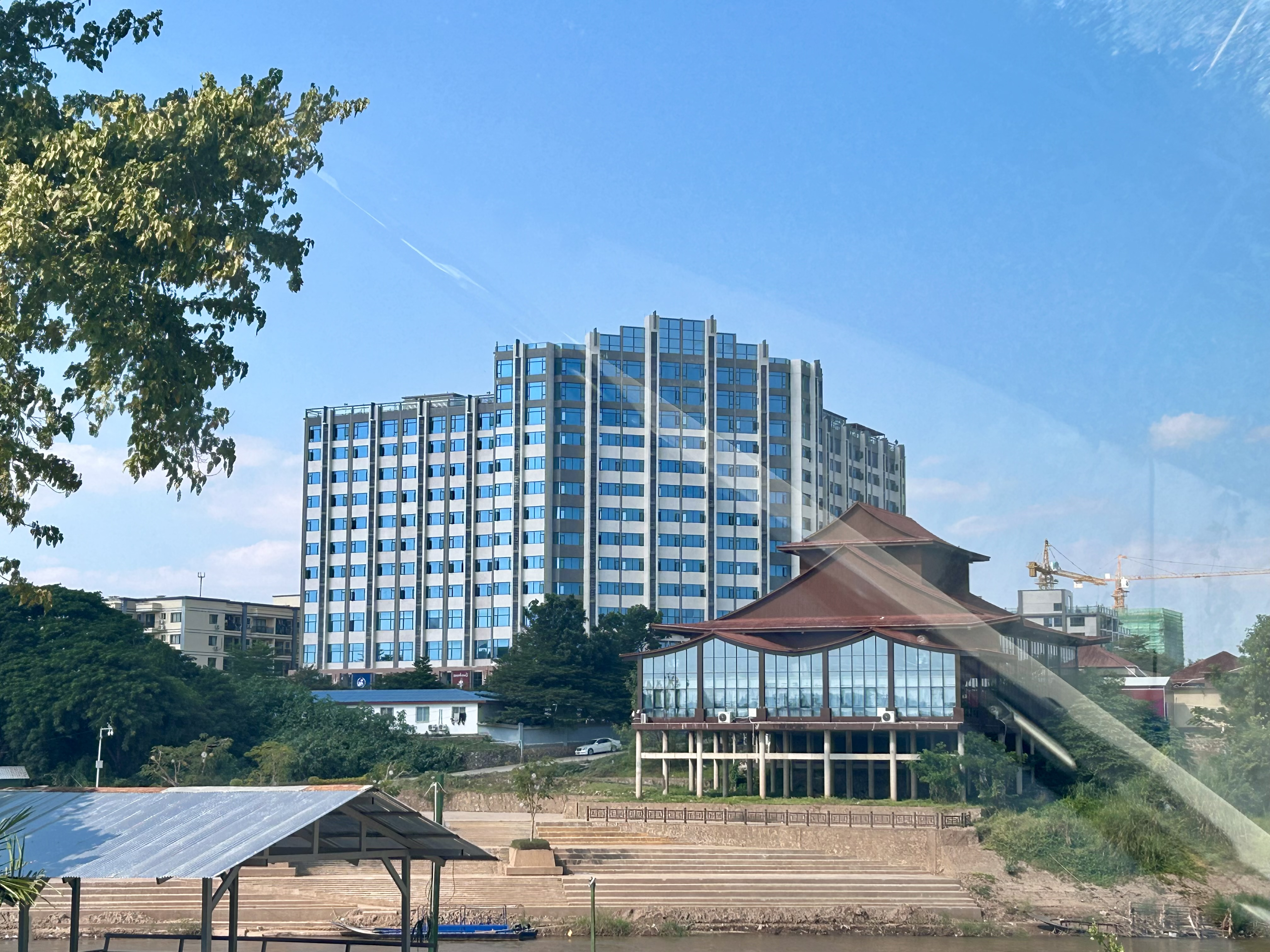
Scam center in Shwe Kokko, Myanmar

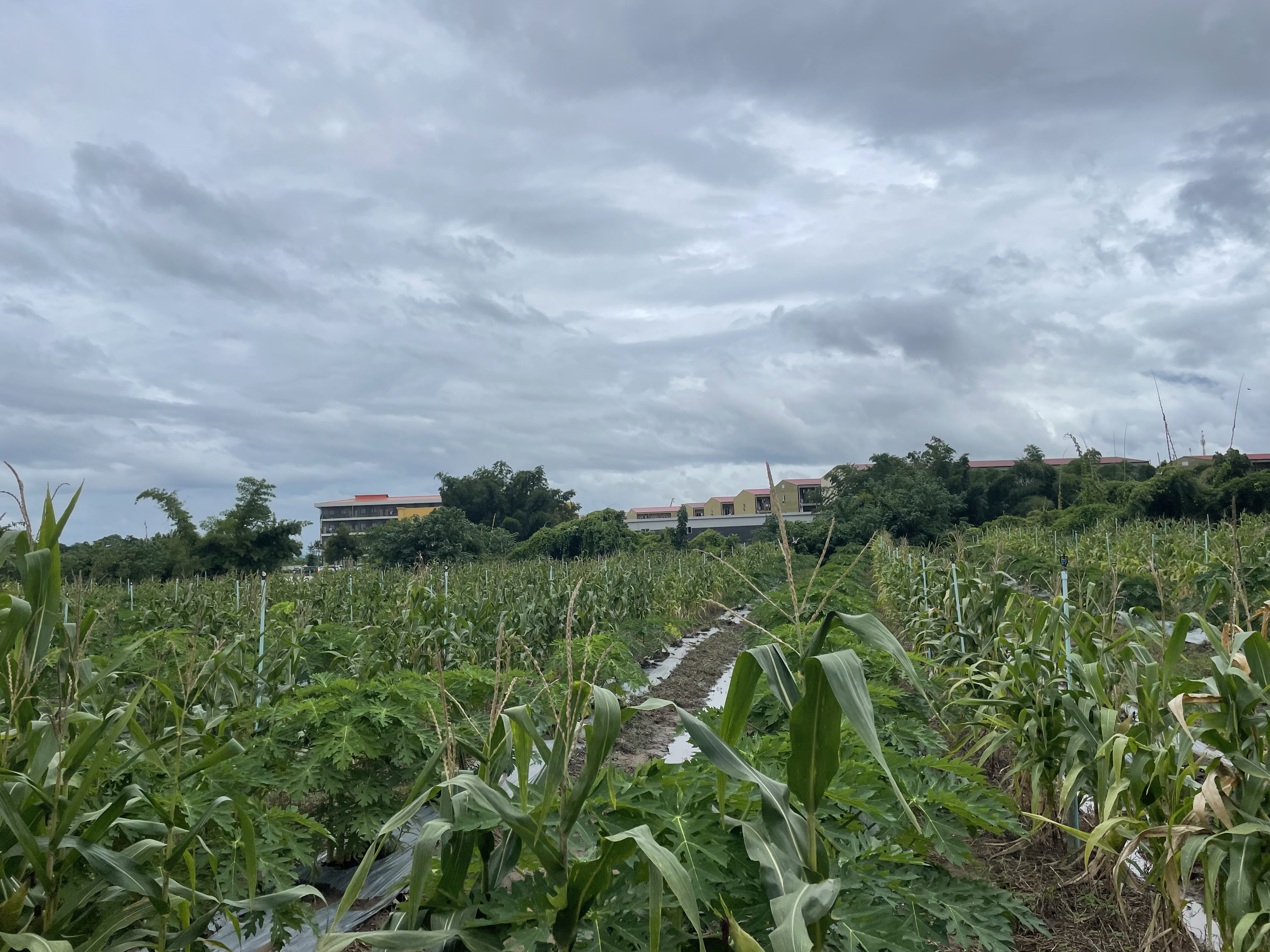
KK Park, a scam center in Myawaddy, Myanmar

A scam center, fraud factory, fraud park, scam factory, scam compound, scam hub, scam park, fraud center, fraud compound, or fraud hub is a collection of large fraudulent organizations usually involved in human trafficking operations, generally found in Southeast Asia and usually operated by a criminal gang. Scam center operators lure foreign nationals to scam hubs, where they are forced into modern slavery, to scam internet users around the world into fraudulently buying cryptocurrencies, running scam-through-romance frauds (pig butchering scam), digital arrest scam (most common in India), or withdrawing cash via social media and online dating apps. Trafficked victims' passports are confiscated, and they are threatened with organ harvesting and forced prostitution if they do not perform well. Scam center operations proliferated in Cambodia, Laos, Myanmar, and other countries during the COVID-19 pandemic, and were further aided by the civil war in Myanmar.

== Nomenclature ==
The term fraud factory first appeared in a 2022 Sydney Morning Herald article about the Southeast Asian scams and human trafficking industry and was coined by Jan Santiago of the Global Anti-Scam Organization (GASO), a victims advocacy group, in describing scamming operations in the region.

The term was used by Kenya's Ministry of Foreign Affairs for the activity of trafficking victims to Asia where they use digital media to meet westerners and sell them cryptocurrencies. In Chinese, the term "fraud industrial park" (simplified Chinese: 诈骗园区; traditional Chinese: 詐騙園區; pinyin: zhàpiàn yuánqū; lit. 'fraud park zone'), sometimes shortened to 'park' (园区; 園區; yuánqū), has emerged in reference to these operations.

== Organization and ownership ==
Fraud factories are often operated by Chinese and Taiwanese criminal syndicates based in Southeast Asia. Those who willingly collude with the syndicates include Thai and Cambodian individuals. The gang's traditional revenue stream of gambling reduced during the COVID-19 pandemic and their activities increasingly focused on fraud factories thereafter to regain lost revenue.

== Human trafficking victims ==
Between August and late September 2022, the Kenyan embassy in Thailand facilitated the rescue of 76 trafficking victims from Myanmar and Laos. The victims were mostly Kenyan, and included Ugandans and a Burundian. The trafficked Kenyans were prevented from leaving unless they paid 1.2 million Kenyan shillings and were threatened with forced sex work and organ harvesting if they did not meet work performance targets. Some trafficking victims have returned to Kenya with broken limbs, from beatings by their captors. Two victims who spoke to the BBC were rescued by Awareness Against Human Trafficking. According to Kenya's foreign affairs ministry in November 2022, one Kenyan died after a botched organ harvesting operation linked to a fraud factory in Myanmar.

Vietnamese charity organization Blue Dragon reported in 2023 that trafficking victims forced to work in scamming operations in Myanmar were forced to sell their organs if they failed to meet quotas.

Myanmar is also an emerging destination for international labour trafficking, especially along its border areas. Victims in Myanmar include nationals from throughout Asia, including mainland China, Hong Kong, India, Indonesia, Malaysia, Nepal, the Philippines, Taiwan, and Thailand. Victims are lured by the false promise of high-paying jobs, and are trafficked through major cities like Yangon and Bangkok, and transit points like Mae Sot and Chiang Rai. They are then forced to work in "special economic zones" along Myanmar's borders, such as Shwe Kokko.

In late 2023, the United Nations Human Rights Office estimated that at least 120,000 people in Myanmar were trafficked there and are being held in online scam compounds. At least 100,000 people are being held in similar circumstances in Cambodia. Other criminal-owned enterprises were also being run in Laos, the Philippines and Thailand. In 2023, Chinese and Myanmar authorities collaborated to arrest over 57,000 individuals involved in cybercrime as part of China's attempt to halt Chinese scam victims abroad.

In May 2023, the Philippine Senate's Committee on Women, Children, Family Relations and Gender Equality conducted an inquiry into the proliferation of illegal activities involving foreign nationals, including human trafficking and racketeering, within scam hubs in various points of the archipelago. Senator Risa Hontiveros presented videos and reports of recent raids made by Philippine law enforcement agencies on a number of commercial and residential properties in Clark, Pampanga, that resulted in the rescue of 1,300 victims and the confiscation of over ₱180 million in cash. By August, the committee discovered that many of these scam hubs had been "hiring" more locals than foreign nationals.

In March 2024, more than 800 Filipinos and foreign nationals were rescued from a large scam hub in Bamban, Tarlac, after it was raided for alleged illegal activities that included crypto and love scams; the hub was legally registered as a Philippine Offshore Gaming Operator (POGO) firm. In August 2024, another 162 foreign nationals were rescued from scam hubs in Cebu illegally operating as POGOs. In January 2025, Chinese national Wang Xing was rescued from a scam center in Myanmar after his girlfriend publicized his case on the social network Weibo; he had been taken trafficked from Mae Sot, Thailand, and told the police that approximately 50 Chinese nationals were still being held at the same site where he had been detained.

== Operations ==
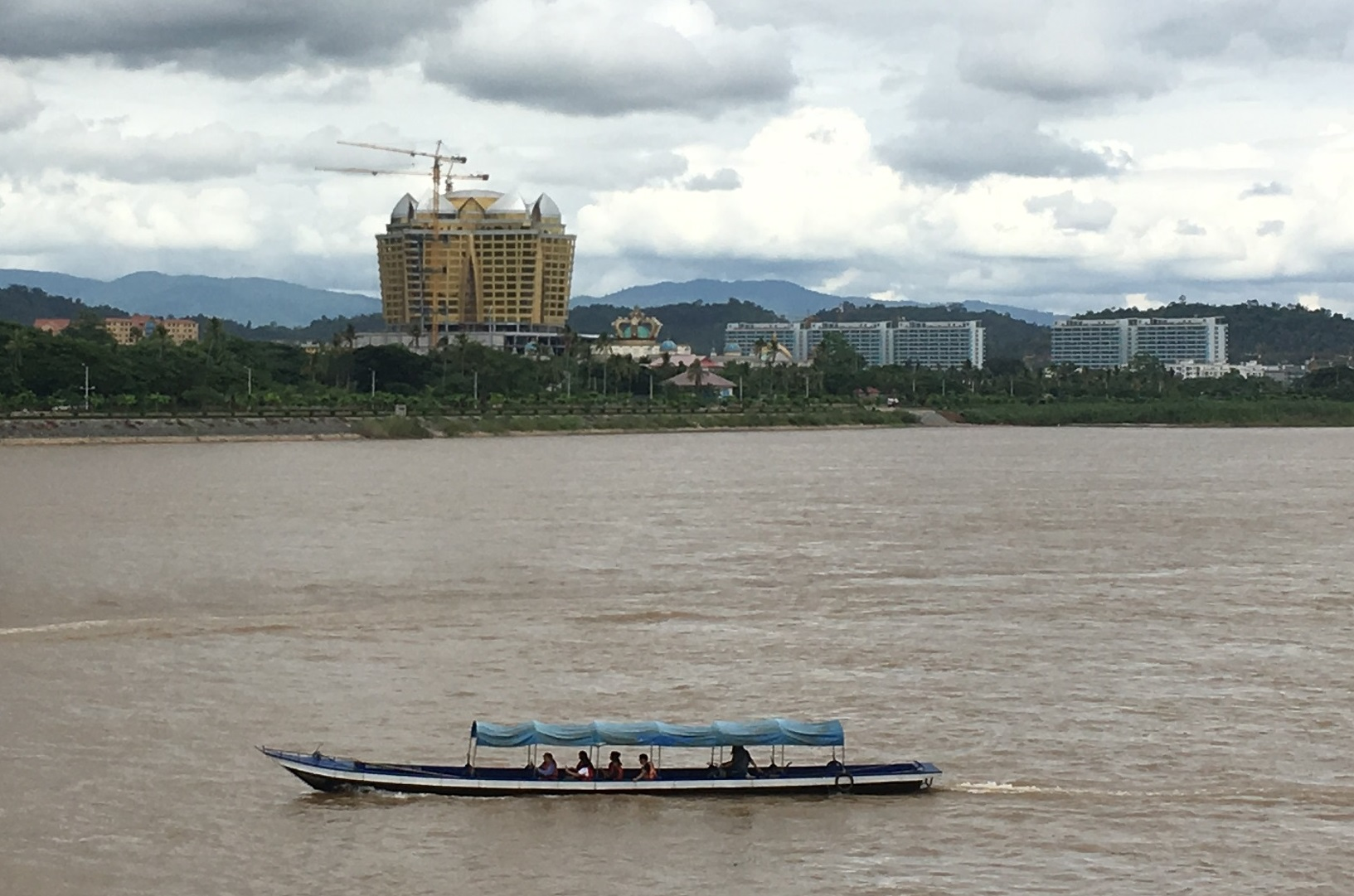
The Golden Triangle Special Economic Zone by the banks of the Mekong River

An anti-crime pact signed between Taipei and Beijing in 2009 led to more than 1,600 arrests of fraud suspects two years later, driving the remaining Taiwanese crime syndicates to countries in Southeast Asia.

Following the COVID-19 pandemic, there was an increase in the number and activities of scam centers throughout Southeast Asia.

In 2022, BBC News reported the locations of fraud factories as being in Laos and Myanmar, notably in Kachin where the Kachin conflict is occurring, a factor that makes rescues difficult. In 2022, The Japan Times reported that factories which initially started operations in Cambodia later switched locations to Laos, and that victims were held in special economic zones in Laos and Myanmar, specifically in Myawaddy, as well as casinos in Cambodia, particularly in Sihanoukville. The trafficked victims are lured with job offers, with the BBC reporting one victim having traveled to Thailand for a job before being driven to Laos.

Scam center workers are trained to create online social media and dating personas, which they use to build up trust with westerners and engage in fake romance scams, with the goal of encouraging the westerners to buy cryptocurrencies. The targets of the bait and switch cyber crime were predominantly US citizens. The process of fraudulently building up trust with victims online in order to sell them cryptocurrencies is known as "pig butchering".

During the Myanmar civil war, the Three Brotherhood Alliance launched Operation 1027 against the Myanmar military regime on 27 October 2023, with one of the intended goals being to eradicate scam centers in the Kokang Self-Administered Zone along the northeastern border with China, which had grown frustrated with the Myanmar government's lack of response against fraud factories. On 5 January 2024, the alliance fully captured the city of Laukkai in Kokang from the Myanmar military, and soon more than 40,000 people involved in Kokang's fraud factories were returned to China. Analyst Jason Tower called their operation "extremely successful" in eradicating scam centers from Kokang, although some syndicates were able to move their operations to Cambodia, Laos, and Myanmar's Kayin State. By March 2024, Brigadier General Zaw Min, a former Regional Operations Command (ROC) chief of Laukkai, was imprisoned by Myanmar's military government for his alleged role in online scam operations, and was later given a death sentence in July.

After increased internet service provider (ISP) blocking of VPNs in Myanmar, Starlink usage has increased in Myanmar, despite the service being unauthorized under Myanmar's Telecommunications Law. In February 2025, Thailand cut off internet services to three regions of Myanmar on the border between the two countries, due to the high number of scam centers there. Starlink devices have since become even more important to the syndicates that run them.

In 2024, Rappler reported that many in the Philippine media as well as government had been unaware that a large number of scam hubs in the Philippines had been operating in the country under the legal cover of Philippine Offshore Gaming Operator (POGO) licenses that were issued by the Philippine Amusement and Gaming Corporation; although POGO licenses were first issued in 2003, they flourished during the presidency of Rodrigo Duterte. A 2024 congressional investigation of scam and trafficking operations by a Tarlac POGO hub led to the arrest of Bamban mayor Alice Guo and her alleged sister and sister-in-law, Shiela Guo and Cassandra Ong, as well as a manhunt for Duterte's former spokesperson, Harry Roque, who has been on the run after questions on his sudden wealth led to questions about his role in a Pampanga POGO hub, identified as Lucky South 99, that was also managed by Cassandra Ong.

According to Wired, "at least eight scam compounds based around the Myanmar-Thailand border region" use Starlink for their Internet connection either wholly or in part.

In March 2024, the head of Interpol estimated that the combined revenues of Southeast Asian organized crime networks were $2 to $3 trillion per year, with a typical criminal organization making $50 billion per year. A United States Institute of Peace study, meanwhile, gave the "conservative estimate" that, as of the end of 2023, $64 billion was stolen per year by criminal syndicates involved in scamming and illegal gambling. In the Mekong countries, the stolen funds amounted to $43.8 million, almost 40% of the combined formal GDP of Laos, Cambodia, and Myanmar. The significant share of this money that is passed on to the ruling elites in these countries gives them a strategic interest in protecting the scamming industry.

According to American government estimates, Americans lose about ten billion dollars annually to scam centers based in Southeast Asia.

In July 2026, the United Nations Office on Drugs and Crime estimated that scam offences across East Asia, Southeast Asia, Australia and New Zealand had caused losses of between US$88.3 billion and US$114.1 billion during 2025. Its assessment found that scam-centre networks were increasingly using cryptocurrency, encrypted communications, generative artificial intelligence and deepfake technology, while shifting into smaller, offshore or underground operations in response to law-enforcement raids.

== Defensive criminal actions ==
Scam compounds are able to continue operating even though their locations are known, by bribing local law enforcement and politicians. As of 2024, organizations had allegedly harassed at least one researcher, using deep fakes to impersonate his father over phone and video chats, after stealing his phone number.

== Common locations ==
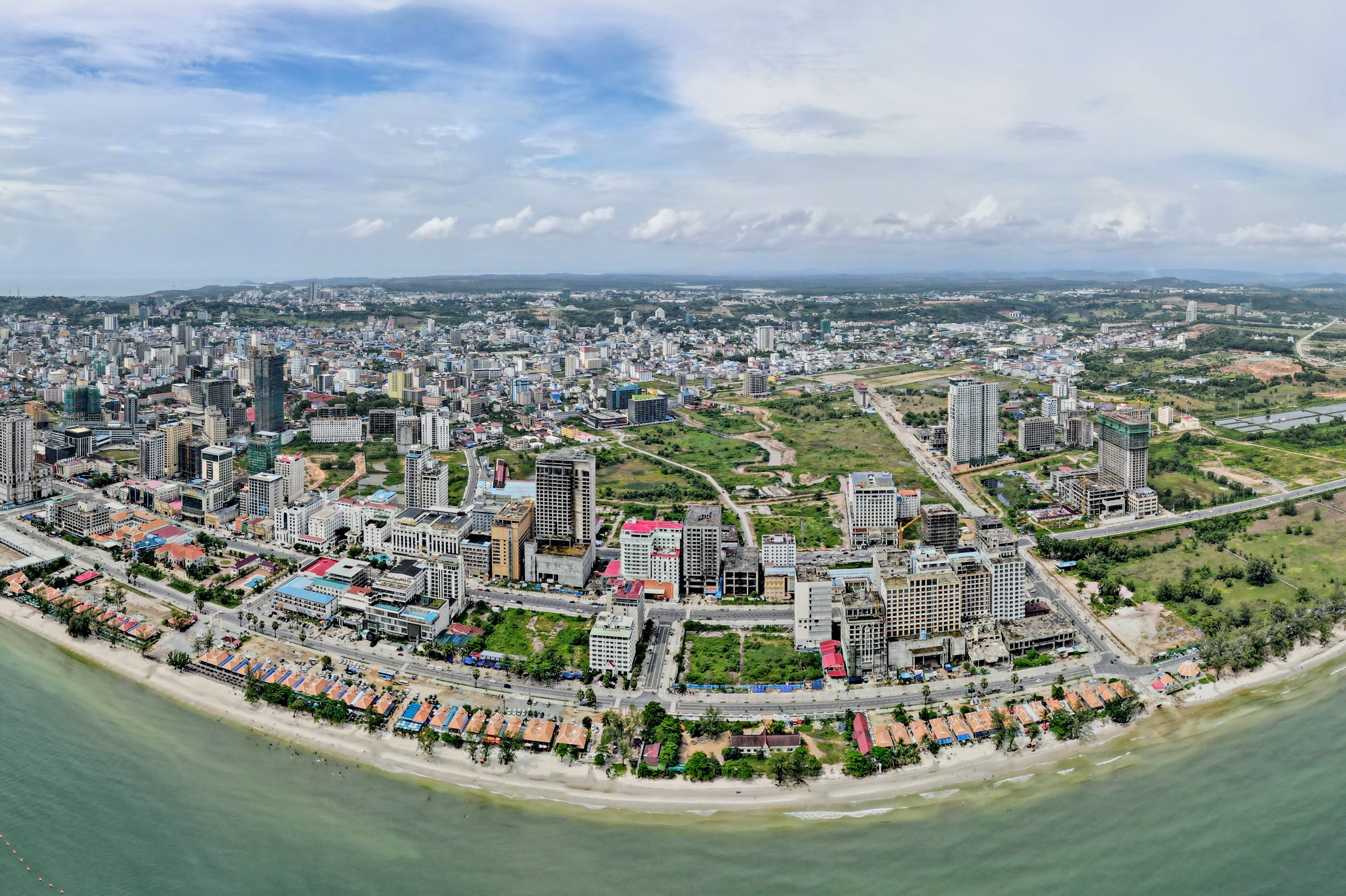
Sihanoukville, Cambodia

Cambodia, Laos, and Myanmar in Southeast Asia are reported to host some notable scam centers. These countries are particularly vulnerable due to dysfunction in their governments and law enforcement agencies. Below are some known common locations for scam centers, according to The Diplomat:

- Cambodia:
  - Sihanoukville
  - Poipet
  - Bavet
- Laos:
  - Golden Triangle Special Economic Zone
- Myanmar:
  - Laukkai (on the border with China)
  - Myawaddy (on the border with Thailand) and nearby:
    - KK Park
    - Shwe Kokko
  - Mong La (on the border with China)

== International reactions ==
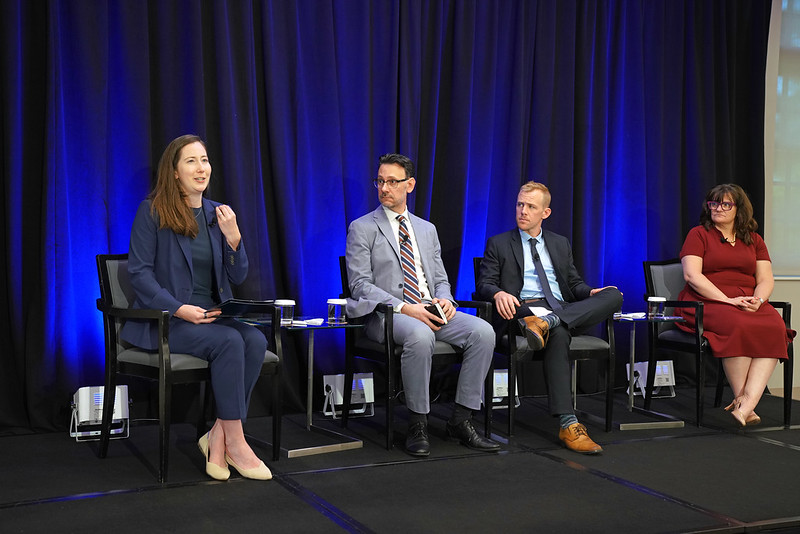
United States Institute of Peace discussing industrial-scale scam compounds in 2024

Instances of Taiwanese fraud suspects being unilaterally deported to China from other countries have drawn criticism by Taipei. Fraud convicts in Taiwan as of 2016 receive more lenient sentences than in China.

In March 2021, the Criminal Investigation Bureau of the Chinese Ministry of Public Security released the National Anti-Fraud Center app, which advertises that it can maintain telecommunications network security by blocking suspicious content and creating channels for reporting online fraud and raising awareness for fraud prevention. In November 2023, China issued arrest warrants for junta-aligned Ming Xuechang, and three other Ming family members for their involvement in online scamming operations. Ming later committed suicide. The other three were captured by Burmese authorities and handed over to China. 39 people involved in the Ming syndicate were sentenced in Zhejiang Province. 11 were sentenced to death.

In August 2024, the secretary of the Philippines' Department of Migrant Workers said that Philippine authorities will "get the statements of the [Filipino] victims [of the fraud factories in Laos] to pinpoint who recruited them [...] in the Philippines and file the necessary charges."

In October 2025, during the ASEAN Summit in Kuala Lumpur, the President of South Korea and the Prime Minister of Cambodia agreed to establish a joint task force to combat online scam networks that disproportionately targeted South Korean nationals. The task force was intended to include law-enforcement collaboration and intelligence sharing to address increasingly transnational online fraud and related crimes affecting citizens of both countries.

During the 2025 Cambodian–Thai border crisis, the Royal Thai Army bombed scam centers in Cambodia.

In November 2025, Japan publicly pledged support to Cambodia in its efforts to combat online scam networks and technology-based fraud. During a meeting on November 12 between Chhay Sinarith, head of the Secretariat of the Commission for Combating Online Scams (CCOS), and Japanese Ambassador to Cambodia Ueno Atsushi, both sides agreed to enhance cooperation in security cooperation, information sharing, capacity building, and broader collaborative actions to address the transnational nature of online scams. Ambassador Ueno commended Cambodia's commitment to tackling scam operations and said Japan would continue cooperation in these efforts.

== See also ==
- No More Bets, a 2023 Chinese crime thriller film about people trafficked into a scam center

General:

- Slavery in the 21st century
- Cryptocurrency and crime
- List of confidence tricks
