= No. 8 Park =

Building complex in Cambodia

- ៨ park
- Alternative names: Mansion No. 8 Wansheng Commercial City; Munch Commercial City, Legend Park; Huione Park
- Etymology: The name is generally believed to be associated with the adjacent National Road 8 of Cambodia; the number "8" also carries an auspicious meaning in Chinese culture.

General information
- Status: Investigated and seized by judicial authorities
- Type: A gated commercial-residential complex; authorities and international media have identified it as having served as a base for large-scale telecommunications fraud operations.
- Location: Tboung Wat Village, Krabau Commune, Kanhchriech District, Prey Veng Province
- Coordinates: 11.6153512°N 105.7866903°E
- Current tenants: None; after being sealed off, the park was closed by the authorities and monitored 24 hours a day.
- Named for: National Highway 8
- Construction started: 2023
- Completed: Reports indicate that some facilities were put into operation while still under construction; at the time of the media visit, certain structures remained unfinished.
- Opened: Operations began in 2025; Cambodian online media outlet Thmey Thmey, citing officials, reported that the compound was expected to commence online scam activities around early 2025.
- Closed: Authorities conducted a sweep from early to mid-February 2026; on April 3, 2026, the investigating judge carried out a search and formally seized the property.
- Owner: The registration and ultimate control of the property remain under investigation. The registered owner is Brandon Luo; two other owners, both nationals of China, remain at large.
- Affiliation: Prince Group, Huione Group

Technical details
- Floor count: Multiple multi-story buildings and villas
- Floor area: Total floor area as stated in the construction permit exceeds 620,000 square meters

Design and construction
- Developer: The operating company is Legend Innovation. Eang Soklim is listed as a director/front person. According to authorities, he is currently being held at Phnom Penh’s PJ Prison, and the case remains under judicial proceedings.
- Known for: In March 2026, the UK government imposed sanctions on what it described as one of the largest identified scam compounds in Cambodia, noting that it could house approximately 20,000 trafficked workers

Other information
- Number of rooms: 168 buildings (55 large structures and 113 villas), comprising a total of 4,707 rooms
- Approximately 20,000 to 28,000 individuals are involved in the trade or have been trafficked Reports indicate that the complex is equipped with access control gates, perimeter fencing, CCTV, and a large-scale network server room

No. 8 Park ( Khmer: ៨ park), also known as No. 8 Mansion, Meun Chey Commercial City (Khmer: មជ្ឈមណ្ឌលពាណិជ្ជកម្មម៉ឺនជ័យមជ្ឈមណ្ឌល ពាណិជ្ជកម្ម ម៉ឺនជ័យ), Legend Park or Huione Park, is a large enclosed complex located in Kom Chay Myit district, Prey Veng province, Cambodia, adjacent to National Highway 8 and the Meun Chey International Border Checkpoint. According to the local authorities, the park was initially declared as a commercial and residential integrated development project, covering an area of about 120 hectares. It was planned to include office buildings, dormitories, shopping malls and restaurants. There were also reports that there was a casino in the park. The entire park was described as a closed "city within a city".

When the government of the United Kingdom sanctioned Legend Innovation in March 2026, it listed No. 8 Park as one of the largest scam centers in Cambodia at the time, and said that the park could accommodate about 20,000 trafficked workers. Different sources have different figures on the number of people in the park. Most Chinese and English media reported about 20,000 people; Cambodian online media Thmey Thmey quoted officials as saying that 28,000 foreigners were found during the crackdown.

The park is operated by Legend Innovation, with Eang Soklim as the nominal director. The investigation agency indicated that the company was related to the network of Prince Group founder Chen Zhi and former chairman of Huione Group, Li Xiong. Thmey Thmey quoted Hai Makara, a member of the secretariat of the Special Committee for Combating Tech Fraud in Cambodia, as saying that the land of the park was held by Prince Group and the infrastructure was invested by Huione Group, with the two parties sharing the profits in a 50/50 ratio; however, the relevant ownership structure has not yet been confirmed by company registration information or court judgment.

The Phnom Penh Post quoted Cambodian authorities as saying that, based on intelligence provided by the Ministry of Public Security of China, the Federal Bureau of Investigation, and the fugitive, the authorities launched an operation to raid the park in February 2026; Cambodian media BTV News and Thmey Thmey said that the raid was completed in mid-February and the park was officially sealed off by the pre-trial judge on 3 April 2026. Eang Soklim was subsequently detained by the Phnom Penh judicial authorities, and the British government also imposed sanctions on him and Legend Innovation. Chen Zhi was repatriated to China in January 2026.

== Naming and location ==
The blockchain intelligence analysis agency Elliptic pointed out that the number "8" in the park may be related to the park's proximity to Cambodia's National Highway 8, as well as the traditional concept that the number represents good fortune in Chinese culture. The park also has several names, with the official Khmer language and Cambodian media more often using names such as "Meun Chey Commercial City". In addition, the complex is also known as Legend Park. The park is operated by Legend Innovations, and because the Huione Group once had a presence in the park, it is also known as "Huione Park".

The park is located in Tboung Wat Village, Klong Chay Myitkyina District, Prey Veng province, Cambodia, covering an area of approximately 120 hectares. It is adjacent to the Vanseong International Border Checkpoint and the Cambodia–Vietnam border, and is also adjacent to National Highway 8.

== Construction ==
Construction of the park began in 2023. Prey Veng Governor Sou Somalin said that the project was initially declared to the local authorities as a residential and mixed development project, which the authorities believed at the time was expected to boost economic activity in the local and surrounding areas. Cambodian independent news agency Voice of Democracy cited documents obtained by the monitoring organization Cyber Scam Monitor, indicating that the relevant departments issued three building permits in July 2024 and March 2025, approving the construction of hundreds of buildings with a total floor area of more than 620,000 square meters.

The project took about two years to complete, and was constructed in phases and used while under construction. Some of the earlier completed buildings have been put into use, while the later buildings and those near the road are still under construction. The Khmer Times and BTV News reported that about 7,000 foreigners had moved into the park in 2024, and the number increased to nearly 20,000 by 2025. Thmey Thmey quoted officials as saying that the project was completed in 2024 and online fraud began to appear around the beginning of 2025.

After the authorities launched an investigation in February 2026, when the media visited the park, no one was there. Some unfinished buildings and a large amount of building materials could still be seen on site.

== Park and facilities ==
No. 8 Park is centered around a central artificial lake. The park is large in scale and has various facilities such as offices, residences, commerce and entertainment. It forms a relatively closed "city within a city" pattern. The park has 168 buildings, including 55 densely distributed multi-story buildings and 113 villas, with a total of 4,707 rooms, mainly used for office space and accommodation. The park is surrounded by walls and multiple entrances and exits. Different areas and passages inside are equipped with access control gates. The main roads and public spaces are also equipped with a large number of closed-circuit television monitoring devices. In addition, there is a large network room in the park. The cabinets are equipped with a large number of optical fibers and dedicated communication lines to support the computer equipment and network communication in the park.

The park has a variety of living and commercial facilities, including large canteens, supermarkets, convenience stores, as well as Chinese restaurants, barbecue and noodle restaurants, and entertainment venues such as nightclubs and KTVs. In terms of leisure and medical facilities, there is a casino in the central area. Many shops in the park use Chinese signs, including the "Golden Bay Entertainment City" gaming entertainment facilities, as well as medical service venues such as "Golden Bay Clinic" and pharmacies, and commercial facilities such as foot massage and health clubs.

== Structure and operational ownership ==
The park was operated by Legend Innovation Co., Ltd., which was registered in Cambodia. The director was Eang Soklim, a Cambodian national, who was about 39 years old when he was arrested. According to The Cambodia China Times, the official documents it obtained showed that Eang Soklim was the person in charge of the park, and there were two other registered owners, Brandon Luo and Lin He Jiang. The documents also stated that the property belonged to a company affiliated with the Prince Group. BTV reported that the development of the park involved the above three people. Two of the owners, who were Chinese nationals, were at large. Eang Soklim was identified as a Cambodian nominee and had been ordered by the court to be detained in Phnom Penh PJ Prison (Judicial Police Prison/Phnom Penh Capital Prison).

As for the behind-the-scenes rights arrangement of the park, Haima Kala, a member of the secretariat of the Cambodian Special Committee for Combating Tech Fraud, said that the 120 hectares of land were held by the Prince Group, while the infrastructure was invested by the Huione Group, with the two parties sharing the profits in a 50/50 ratio. The actual behind-the-scenes controllers of the project pointed to Chen Zhi, the founder of the Prince Group who was accused of leading a transnational criminal network, and Li Xiong, the former chairman of the Huione Group, nicknamed "Boss Xi".

Elliptic's investigation revealed that the business registration contact number for Legend Innovation in Cambodia was publicly used by Cambodia Heng Xin Real Estate, a subsidiary of Prince Group, which was sanctioned by the United States and the United Kingdom. Eang Soklim also attended Prince Group's annual meetings and charity events on several occasions and had social interactions with Ing Dara, a director of Prince Group who was also sanctioned. The agency also pointed out that there was a physical store of Huione Pay in the park, which was called "Bank No. 8" on the signboard, and Huione Logistics was also located in the park. During the liquidity crisis of Huione Pay in December 2025, the property management of the park issued a notice stating that merchants who refused to accept the payment method would be expelled.

== Criminal operations and internal management ==
According to the Khmer Times and BTV, about 7,000 foreign nationals entered the park in 2024, and the number increased to nearly 20,000 in 2025, with the majority being from China, Pakistan, India and Nepal. Thmey Thmey quoted officials as saying that 28,000 foreign nationals were found during the raid in February 2026, with the majority being from China, and also from Vietnam, India, Bangladesh, Pakistan and Cambodia. The British Foreign, Commonwealth and Development Office stated that workers were often lured into the park under the pretext of legitimate work, then imprisoned and forced to engage in online fraud; related reports also mentioned fraudulent investment and emotional fraud methods. The Cambodian side stated that "about 20,000 people voluntarily left afterward".

There was a room in the park with the sign of "Commercial Affairs Department of Singapore Police Force" on it, which was reported to be used to impersonate law enforcement officers during video calls. The United Daily News reported that eight sets of foreign police uniforms were seized during the raid, along with Chinese slogans such as "Performance is dignity, prove your value with performance" and a document titled "Reward and punishment system of Office 103", which included fines of US$20 to US$50 for being late or leaving early, US$20 for obtaining a list but not making a phone call, and fines of US$200 and above for disobeying management. Several media outlets also recorded the slogan "Please don't pretend to work hard, because results won't play along with your act". The whiteboard and notebooks had percentages, amounts, and words such as "training plan" and "reward" on them.

Elliptic indicated that since its launch in December 2025, the Chinese gambling platform "8 Entertainment", which is associated with the park’s merchant directory and Telegram promotion, has received approximately US$12 million in cryptocurrency payments from related cryptocurrency addresses; in January 2026, it identified 10 merchants in the park who received approximately US$393,000 in Tether. The agency also cited examples: some addresses associated with fraud cases or black market trading platforms and sellers such as "Potato Guarantee" and "Xinbi" had made payments to catering merchants in the park. When the UK sanctioned "Xinbi", it stated that the platform provided services such as stolen personal information and satellite internet equipment, and indicated that its service targets included parks like Park 8.

== Sanctions, crackdowns, seizures and judicial procedures ==
After the United States and the United Kingdom imposed sanctions on Prince Group in October 2025, Cambodia arrested Chen Zhi in January 2026 and handed him over to China. Cambodia stated that it revoked his Cambodian citizenship because his acquisition of Cambodian citizenship was illegal. Elliptic pointed out that after Chen Zhi’s arrest, panic broke out in some of the fraud parks. Shortly after the agency published its investigation on No. 8 Park on February 4, the park began to be evacuated and cleared out. Another report on 9 February indicated that the park’s personnel had to evacuate by 13 February.

The operation to clear out No. 8 Park began in early February 2026. The Phnom Penh Post quoted Cambodian authorities as saying that the operation was based on intelligence provided by the Ministry of Public Security of China, the Federal Bureau of Investigation, and people who fled the park. During the operation, several suspected organizers and managers were arrested, and about 20,000 people subsequently left the park. BTV said that the provincial command launched the operation in early February and completed the clearing in mid-February. The United Daily News reported that during the operation, 3,779 computers, 11,585 mobile phones, 56 mainframes, 35 servers and 8 sets of foreign police uniforms were seized, as well as passports and other items.

The pre-trial judge conducted a search on 3 April 2026, and formally sealed off the entire park. The park was subsequently sealed off and placed under 24-hour surveillance. The seized information equipment was transported to Phnom Penh for storage, while the above-ground structures and other assets within the park may be confiscated by the court in accordance with the law.

Eang Soklim has been ordered by the court to be detained in Phnom Penh PJ Prison, while the Khmer Times reported that he was being held in Bachok Prison. BTV reported that two other registered owners of Chinese nationality are still at large and that Cambodia is cooperating with foreign law enforcement agencies to pursue them, but the report did not disclose their names. Li Xiong’s Cambodian nationality was also revoked and he was transferred to China by Cambodia on 1 April 2026. The Cambodia China Times later quoted Yang Weilin, Vice Minister of Public Security, as saying that Chen Zhi, Li Xiong and Liu Ren are all the ringleaders of the case who have been arrested.

On 26 March 2026, the government of the United Kingdom sanctioned Legend Innovation, Eang Soklim and the cryptocurrency platform Newcoin, and froze related properties in London. The Organized Crime and Corruption Reporting Project reported that the sanctioned individuals also included Hu Xiaowei, Chen Zhi’s long-term partner, Li Tian, the deputy in charge of managing the overseas fund network, and Wang Xiaoyan, the wife of Zhu Zhongbiao, the head of Jinbei Group, as well as many other core associates of Prince Group. The U.S. Department of State announced restrictions on the entry of 32 people into the United States, most of whom were related to Prince Group; the Taipei District Prosecutors Office of Taiwan indicted 62 people and 13 companies in related money laundering cases.

== Aftermath ==
On 21 September 2026, ahead of the "International Conference on Combating Online Fraud" on 23 to 24 September held in Phnom Penh, the Cambodian Ministry of Information, together with the Special Committee on Combating Tech Fraud, arranged for media to enter No. 8 Park, which had been sealed off. Reporters from multiple media outlets participated. The Phnom Penh Post pointed out that the authorities’ opening of the park was one of the measures to demonstrate the work on combating online fraud, and was also seen as part of improving Cambodia’s international image and tourist numbers, which had been damaged by online fraud.

Prey Veng Governor Sou Somalin stated that the project was initially submitted to the local authorities by the developer as a mixed-use commercial and residential development project, and the local government believed that the project would help promote economic development. He also stated that the local administrative authorities had no right to investigate such private parks. The Khmer Times quoted Sou Somalin as saying that no victims reported the case at the time, and it was only after the central government requested an investigation of collective living facilities that the authorities discovered the abnormal situation in the park. Voice of Democracy quoted scholar Seng Vannly as saying that a 120-hectare park involves a large amount of water, electricity, network services and personnel entry and exit, so the claim that he was "completely unaware" of the situation in the park is hard to believe, and he believes it is necessary to investigate whether administrative negligence or corruption is involved. He also pointed out that the approximately 20,000 people in the park should not be regarded as criminals, and some of them may have been deceived or forced to stay in the park.

The Diplomat believes that the crackdown was more intense than similar operations in the past, but the accountability targets were less business people with close ties to the ruling elite, and that the meetings were intended to reshape the government's image. The Standard quoted experts as saying that some criminal gangs have moved to more dispersed locations such as guesthouses, residences and coffee shops, and that the success of the operation still depends on whether the masterminds and the flow of funds involved in the criminal activities can be traced.
