= Prince Group transnational criminal organization case =

International criminal investigation involving Prince Holding Group

Prince Group Transnational Criminal Organization Case
- The U.S. Department of the Treasury's map of the "Prince Group Transnational Criminal Organization."
- Founded: Around 2015
- Founder: Chen Zhi; Hu Xiaowei
- Years active: 2015–present
- Territory: British Virgin Islands; Cambodia; Cayman Islands; China; Cuba; Hong Kong; Isle of Man; South Korea; Laos; Mauritius; Myanmar; Singapore; Taiwan; Palau
- Activities: Crimes related to online gambling; Large-scale cryptocurrency scams (known as "pig-butchering scams"); Human trafficking and forced labor; Torture and violence perpetrated within scam compounds; Transnational money laundering; Conspiracy to commit telecommunications fraud

The Prince Group case is an international investigation of the Cambodian organization Prince Holding Group, its founder Chen Zhi, and affiliated organizations. United States and United Kingdom agencies have accused the Prince Group of operating large-scale scamming operations in Cambodia and Myanmar, enabled by human trafficking and forced labor. Workers, many from China, were lured with false promises of employment and forced to run online "pig butchering" scams in which victims were tricked into investing in cryptocurrency. Funds resulting from the scams were laundered by gambling and cryptocurrency mining operations controlled by the Prince Group.

Chinese authorities had been investigating the Prince Group since around 2020. Between 2020 and 2022, the judicial system of China accused Prince Holding Group and its affiliated network of obtaining more than ¥5 billion renminbi in illegal profits through illegal gambling. On 14 October 2025, the United States Department of the Treasury announced that Prince Holding Group and Chen Zhi, were suspected of being involved in large-scale cryptocurrency fraud, human trafficking and transnational money laundering.

The U.S. Treasury Department characterized the Prince Group as a "Prince Group Transnational Criminal Organization" and imposed unprecedented sanctions on 146 individuals and entities, including Chen Zhi, which was regarded as the most extensive financial sanctions action taken by the United States in Southeast Asia. At the same time, the U.S. federal prosecutor published the indictment against Chen Zhi in the U.S. District Court for the Eastern District of New York, accusing him of planning and leading a huge "cyber fraud empire" with charges including felonies such as wire fraud conspiracy and money laundering conspiracy. The investigation pointed out that the organization's main operating method was to set up fraud parks in Southeast Asian countries such as Cambodia and Myanmar, to traffic and detain laborers on a large scale, and to force them to engage in "pig butchering" scams under the threat of violence, defrauding victims around the world of billions of dollars. The proceeds of their crimes were then laundered through several seemingly legitimate businesses under the Prince Group, such as Prince Bank, cryptocurrency mining, real estate and casinos.

This case led to the largest seizure of crypto assets in history by the U.S. Department of Justice, which seized 127,271 bitcoins (worth approximately US$15 billion) controlled by Chen Zhi; at the same time, the British authorities also froze more than £100 million pounds of his real estate in London. Because Chen Zhi had deep advisory and business relationships with many key figures in Cambodian politics, especially members of the family of Cambodian Senate President and former Prime Minister Hun Sen, this case was not only regarded as an important milestone in the global fight against cybercrime, but also had a serious impact on Cambodia's international reputation and financial system. Chen Zhi has now been arrested and extradited back to China for further processing.

== Background ==
=== Chen Zhi ===
==== Biography ====
Chen Zhi (born 16 December 1987) is the director and chairman of Prince Group. He was born in Lianjiang County, Fuzhou, Fujian, China. Chen dropped out of school after finishing the second year of junior high school. He ran a small internet cafe in Fuzhou. According to Radio France Internationale, he renounced his Chinese citizenship. He moved to Cambodia in 2011 and began investing in real estate in Phnom Penh when the local market was still in its infancy. On 16 February 2014, he officially became a Cambodian citizen through investment immigration. He also holds citizenship in Vanuatu and Cyprus. (Note: Although the U.S. Department of Justice initially stated that Chen Chih held British citizenship, this claim was denied following verification by British authorities; the Department of Justice subsequently removed the reference to his British citizenship from the relevant press release.) He has a Bachelor of Business Administration degree from the National University of Management of Cambodia. He has lived in Singapore, Taiwan, the United Kingdom and other places. He was married to Li Caiyun.

==== Connections in Cambodian politics ====
Chen Zhi's rise to prominence is closely linked to the connections he has built in Cambodian politics. He has donated large sums of money through Cambodian leaders, such as providing scholarships for students, donating to the Red Cross, and providing assistance in purchasing vaccines during the COVID-19 pandemic in 2019. He was appointed by royal decree as an advisor to several key high-ranking Cambodian leaders, including Cambodian Interior Minister Sar Kheng, National Assembly President Heng Samrin, Cambodian Prime Minister Hun Sen, and current Cambodian Prime Minister Hun Manet. This position is unpaid but gives him the equivalent of a vice minister. Chen Zhi was conferred the title of Oknha (ឧកញ៉ា) by the Cambodian government in February 2016, and was further promoted to Neak Oknha (អ្នកឧកញ៉ា) in July 2020. Since 2020, he has been Hun Sen's private advisor and has accompanied him on many overseas trips. According to the The Cambodia Daily, he was also the actual charterer of Hun Sen's executive plane. In addition, the Cambodian government presented 25 valuable watches to leaders of various countries during the Seventeenth East Asia Summit in 2022, each worth more than US$20,000, totaling more than US$500,000; these watches were manufactured by Prince Watches, a subsidiary of Prince Real Estate under the Prince Group.

=== Prince Group ===
Chen Zhi's "Base of Operations" in Hong Kong at 68 Kimberley Road

Prince Group is a multinational conglomerate headquartered in Cambodia. According to its official website, the group's core business areas include "real estate development, financial services and consumer services". Prince Group has a very wide business scope, covering real estate development, financial services (including Prince Bank), hotels, casinos and retail supermarkets, and its senior executives also have huge assets around the world. In September 2025, Habanos S.A., the world's largest Cuban cigar brand, submitted its latest equity structure documents at the request of the Gothenburg police in Sweden. The documents show that the company has actually been indirectly controlled by Prince Group through Allied Cigar Corporation Limited registered in Hong Kong. It is reported that Prince Group has made a profit of about HK$2 billion from the investment in just five years since the acquisition was completed.

==== Source of wealth ====
According to Agence France-Presse, despite being a billionaire, the source of Chen Zhi's wealth remains unclear. In 2015, he founded Prince Group and quickly transformed it into a well-known brand that can be seen everywhere on the streets of Cambodia. In 2018, Amiga Entertainment, owned by Chen Zhi, applied to open an account at the Cayman National Bank in Meng Island, but was rejected. The reason was not revealed until 2019 when the bank was hacked: Prince Group refused to disclose the source of its funds. Amiga Entertainment claimed that its parent company was an online casino company, Ableton Prestige Global Limited, and director John Cottin also said that the company was actually owned by Chen Zhi and his wife, Li Caiyun. Chen Zhi's side explained that he initially received a US$2 million loan from his uncle around 2011 to establish Hengxin Real Estate Company, but when the Cayman National Bank asked for the name of his so-called uncle and the source of his wealth, they did not reply. According to an interview with a former employee of Prince Group by Radio Free Asia, it was revealed that Amiga Entertainment was used as a money laundering tool to cover up large-scale fund transfers between Southeast Asia and Meng Island. The employee pointed out that once the funds were transferred into Amiga Entertainment's account in Moe Island, they would flow to the company's senior management.

==== Overseas business disputes ====
Chen Zhi holds a 37.5% stake in Grand Legend International Asset Management Group registered in Palau. The company acquired the development rights to Engebelas Island with a 99-year land lease and undertook hotel and resort projects with an investment amount three times the country's economic output. Reuters reported in April 2025 that Prince Group leased land in Palau's Kayanel State and around the country's airport, only a few hundred meters from U.S. military facilities, and was criticized by U.S. Ambassador to Palau Joel Ehrendreich.

In 2018, Prince Group established its headquarters near the Presidential Office Building in Taipei, Taiwan, and operated under the name of a "foreign company" to circumvent the investment restrictions imposed by the Ministry of Economic Affairs on mainland China. Its business covers real estate investment, financial advisory and investment immigration programs, and it once attracted Taiwanese investors to visit Cambodia with a promise of an annual return of 6%. Taiwanese prosecutors said that Prince Group used Taiwanese people to launder money in Taiwan through online gambling and underground money exchange in order to cover up and disguise the proceeds of crime.

The group's Chinese cadres were refused entry by Taiwan's National Immigration Agency due to their suspicious identities and whereabouts. Therefore, they approached Kuomintang legislators Lin Szu-ming and Lee Te-wei, hoping that the two would assist them in entering the country. Lin Szu-ming claimed that he did not assist in lobbying, and Lee Te-wei did not respond.

==== The rise and fall of the Prince Group and Sihanoukville ====
Prince Group's main wealth accumulation before 2019 came from Cambodia's rapidly developing online gambling industry. Prince Real Estate, a subsidiary of Prince Group, invested heavily during this period, transforming Sihanoukville from a declining seaside resort town into a gambling center mainly for Chinese customers. In March 2017, Chen Zhi and Shao Ken jointly established Jinbei Investment Co., Ltd. According to the group's website, the company's investment in Cambodia's tourism industry reached US$300 million. At that time, Shao Ken's father was serving as Minister of the Interior and held great power; in August 2017, Shao Ken succeeded his father and took over the Ministry of Interior. Although Prince Group and Jinbei Group are nominally independent companies, they are closely related, so much so that the Chinese authorities directly regarded Jinbei as a "subsidiary" of Prince Group in judicial documents, but Prince Group denied this claim. In the late 2010s, casinos in Sihanoukville generally adopted an operating model that relied on Chinese customers, namely, setting up online gambling websites, but these websites violated Chinese law. In 2019, Prime Minister Hun Sen announced a ban on the online gambling industry under pressure from China, citing deteriorating security. Coupled with the COVID-19 pandemic and China's travel restrictions, Sihanoukville declined rapidly, but Prince Group was not significantly impacted.

== Prince Group's illicit activities ==
According to Radio Free Asia, after 2019, Prince Group transformed from online gambling to telecommunications fraud and built the "Golden Technology Park" in Cherey Tom, Kandal Province, Cambodia. The park is accused of being involved in human trafficking, torture and forced labor. Several local residents and former employees of the park told the media that the park was surrounded by a 10-foot-high concrete wall and barbed wire. The entrance was guarded by uniformed security guards. The actual operation was different from the publicly claimed industrial park. The park was engaged in illegal activities such as online fraud, extortion and sexual exploitation. Witnesses said that if workers tried to escape from the park, they would be chased and beaten or electrocuted. Sometimes they were even hit by vehicles and forcibly brought back. Most of the detainees were Vietnamese, Chinese and Malaysians. They were mainly forced to engage in fraud work. Some women were forced to film pornographic videos or engage in sex work. There was also a punishment area in the park. It is said that those who disobeyed or had low work efficiency were detained on the "B1" floor and abused.

The park was listed on the property distribution map of the official website of Prince World Real Estate Group, a subsidiary of Prince Group. Although Prince Group spokesperson Gabriel Tan said that the park was built for customers and had nothing to do with the company, Cambodian business registration information shows that the park's parent company, Jin Yun, is operated by Indara, a businessman closely related to Prince Group, who also serves as a director in several Prince Group companies. In addition, media investigations have pointed out that another company under Prince Group, Hengxin Real Estate, is also involved in human trafficking and fraud activities. According to the judgment of the Wangcang County Court in Sichuan Province, China, one of the illegal online gambling sites cooperating with Prince Group is located in Chiretom. According to the investigation results of Radio Free Asia and Al Jazeera, Prince Group's online fraud and human trafficking activities have extended to multiple parks, and some victims were tortured and forced to pay ransoms before being released.

The U.S. Department of Justice indictment shows that Chen Zhi directed the company to establish and operate at least ten fraud facilities in various parts of Cambodia. These facilities were specifically designed to reach more potential victims, and Chen Zhi personally supervised their operation. His associates were accused of having access to millions of mobile phone numbers and setting up so-called "phone farms" to operate call center fraud. Two of these facilities were equipped with 1,250 mobile phones and controlled approximately 76,000 social media accounts for carrying out fraudulent operations. Internal documents from Prince Group also included techniques for building close relationships with victims and advised employees to avoid using "overly beautiful" female profile pictures to make the accounts appear more authentic. Chen Zhi once ordered that workers who resisted should be "beaten, but not killed."

In addition, according to the diagram published by Chainalysis, Prince Group operated a Bitcoin mining business in Laos under the name of "Warp Data Technology", and transferred a large amount of mined Bitcoins to Chen Zhi's wallet through the Cambodian money laundering hub, Huiwang Group. This mining plan was coordinated with the "pig butchering" scam operated by the group, inducing victims to invest in fictitious cryptocurrency platforms, and then laundering money through more than 100 shell companies. According to the US Office of Foreign Assets Control's investigation of the four Bitcoin addresses controlled by Chen Zhi, these addresses have accumulated more than US$1.77 billion in Bitcoins in the past two and a half years.

== Investigation and actions ==
=== China ===
Since the mid-to-late 2010s, the rapid expansion of the online gambling industry in Sihanoukville, Cambodia, coupled with the involvement of Chinese gangs in usury, extortion, and violence, has led to a deterioration of local security, with a large number of Chinese citizens becoming the main victims. Since most casinos operate online platforms targeting Chinese gamblers, violating Chinese laws, the Chinese authorities have expressed serious concern about this. In 2019, as the economy of Sihanoukville declined, a document from the Wangcang County People's Court in Sichuan pointed out that the Prince Group continued to grow by being involved in large-scale illegal businesses. China has been investigating the Prince Group since 2020 and has maintained close communication and coordination with Cambodia.

In 2020, the Beijing Municipal Public Security Bureau established the "5.27 Special Action Group" to investigate the Prince Group, which was accused of being a Cambodian transnational online gambling group. Court documents show that since 2016, many Chinese citizens have cooperated with relevant personnel of the Cambodian Prince Group to establish online gambling companies targeting the Chinese market, set up multiple subsidiaries in Phnom Penh, Sihanoukville and other places, operated online gambling applications, and profited by manipulating the wins and losses of gamblers through the back-end. The group operated covertly through strict internal regulations and laundered money through underground banks and cryptocurrency transfers, continuing to operate businesses that the Hun Sen government had banned in 2019. The court also revealed in the judgment that the group employed hundreds of so-called "money mules" to transport bank cards between China and Cambodia to circumvent the capital control that each person in China can only carry US$50,000 out of the country per year. In 2022, the court ruled that since 2016, the Prince Group's illegal gambling revenue exceeded RMB 5 billion. The judgment described the Prince Group as a "notorious transnational online gambling criminal gang". Several employees or associates of Prince Group involved in money laundering and gambling activities have been tried and convicted in China. However, the group's founder, Chen Zhi, and senior members did not appear in the court's judgment.

Chen Zhi was arrested by Cambodia on 6 January 2026. On 7 January 2026, The Cambodia China Times reported that Chen Zhi had been arrested in Cambodia and extradited to China for investigation. On 1 April, Li Xiong, a key member of the Prince Group, was extradited from Phnom Penh, Cambodia to China. On 17 June, China's Ministry of Public Security stated that, with the assistance of relevant Cambodian departments, the police extradited Liu Ren, an important member of Chen Zhi's criminal group, from Phnom Penh, Cambodia back to China.

=== United States and United Kingdom ===
In 2022, the Federal Bureau of Investigation (FBI) broke up a Chinese money laundering network in New York City, in which 259 American victims were defrauded of US$18 million by fraudsters associated with the Jinbei Group.

On 14 October 2025, the governments of the United Kingdom and the United States simultaneously announced sanctions against Prince Group and 146 individuals and entities, including its chairman Chen Zhi, cutting off their connection with the U.S. financial system and accusing them of operating "one of the largest transnational criminal organizations in Asia" and involving crimes such as forced labor, telecommunications fraud and cryptocurrency money laundering. The U.S. Department of the Treasury stated that Prince Group mixed illicit proceeds with legitimate economic activities in Cambodia by setting up companies in the British Virgin Islands, Cayman Islands, Mauritius, Taiwan, Hong Kong and Singapore. Companies involved in the Prince Group transnational criminal organization case, including Jinbei Group, Jinfu Resort World and Byex Exchange, were also sanctioned. The sanctions announcement also pointed out that Prince Group had cooperation with Rose Wang, a member of an organized crime group in Palau, who "is the vice-president of Palau’s Overseas Chinese Federation, which may conduct unofficial diplomacy for China".

Regarding asset recovery, the U.S. Department of Justice stated that this operation was the largest cryptocurrency seizure operation in the department's history. Law enforcement successfully seized approximately 127,271 bitcoins from uncustodial wallets controlled by Chen Zhi through tracking on-chain data and technical means. The value of the bitcoins at the time exceeded US$15 billion. The assets are currently held by the U.S. Department of Justice. The UK's Foreign, Commonwealth and Development Office also simultaneously froze Chen Zhi and his millions of pounds in assets and real estate in London. The U.S. authorities emphasized that they will continue to cooperate with international partners to combat the increasingly rampant cross-border fraud activities in Southeast Asia. The case was investigated by the United States District Court for the Eastern District of New York in Brooklyn. Prosecutor Joseph Nocella Jr. stated that Chen Zhi led "one of the largest investment fraud cases in history" and was suspected of using political influence and bribery to protect his business in multiple countries. The group's fraudulent activities caused billions of dollars in losses to victims worldwide and caused "unspeakable suffering." If convicted, Chen Zhi faces up to 40 years in prison.

==== Cryptocurrency confiscation operation ====
According to an investigation by crypto analytics firm Elliptic, the seized Bitcoins originally came from a Bitcoin mining company called LuBian, which has operations in both China and Iran. LuBian once controlled approximately 6% of the global Bitcoin hashrate, but in December 2020, hackers stole 127,426 Bitcoins (worth approximately US$3.5 billion at the time), which then disappeared in early 2021. The investigation revealed that the hackers exploited a vulnerability in the company's algorithm for generating cryptographic keys through brute-force attacks. After the incident, LuBian spent over US$40,000 trying to offer a reward for the return of the funds. The stolen Bitcoins were transferred back to a new wallet in June 2024, and it wasn't until the U.S. Department of Justice released its indictment that it was revealed that these funds were actually linked to Prince Group and its chairman, Chen Zhi. The indictment lists 25 Bitcoin addresses and indicates that these seized Bitcoins were previously held by Chen Zhi, and were the very addresses from which LuBian's Bitcoins were "stolen." The indictment alleges that Chen Zhi was involved in telecom fraud and money laundering conspiracy, and points out that Prince Group converted criminal proceeds into "clean" Bitcoin through its seemingly legitimate corporate network (including cryptocurrency mining business), one of which is LuBian.

== Aftermath ==
Just one day after the U.S. and UK announced joint sanctions against Prince Group, on the night of 15 October 2025, several companies in the "Chinatown" industrial park in Sihanoukville, Cambodia, announced their dissolution, and thousands of foreign employees were forced to evacuate that night.

On 17 October 2025, following the announcement of the sanctions imposed on Chen Zhi, Prince Bank, a subsidiary of the Prince Group, experienced a large-scale run on deposits. A large number of people rushed to the branches to withdraw money, and some branches suspended services due to a shortage of funds. As Prince Bank occupies an important position in Cambodia's financial system, it triggered market panic. On 19 October, the National Bank of Cambodia issued a statement announcing the activation of the depositor protection mechanism and providing "unlimited emergency liquidity support" to stabilize the financial order.

== Reactions ==
=== international ===
The Taipei City Investigation Division of the Ministry of Justice Investigation Bureau has seized 26 luxury vehicles belonging to the Prince Group.

- Cambodia: Thuch Sokhak, Cambodia's Deputy Spokesperson for the Ministry of the Interior said that Cambodia is willing to cooperate with relevant countries in accordance with the legal framework after receiving a formal request for judicial cooperation and confirming that the evidence is sufficient, so as to avoid being seen as protecting the persons involved. However, he also emphasized that the Cambodian government has not yet accused Prince Group or its chairman, Chen Zhi, of the criminal acts alleged by the United States and the United Kingdom, and said that the company's business activities in Cambodia comply with all legal provisions. He added that he hopes that the United States and the United Kingdom can provide strong and consistent evidence to support their accusations, but reiterated that Cambodia's principle is not to protect any lawbreakers.
- Hong Kong: The Hong Kong Police Force froze more than HK$2.7 billion in assets of Prince Group in November 2025, and no one has been arrested yet. The Securities and Futures Commission and the Hong Kong Stock Exchange said they would not comment on individual cases. In May 2026, the High Court approved the Department of Justice's application for a restraining order against 42 individuals including Chan Chi and the company, freezing a total of HK$8.938 billion in assets, including deposits, properties and stocks.
- Singapore: The Monetary Authority of Singapore has confirmed that it has launched an investigation into companies in the country that are associated with Prince Group.
- South Korea: The South Korean government imposed sanctions on Prince Group for its involvement in kidnapping, torture and murder, and discovered that the group had an office in Sunhwa-dong, Jung District, Seoul. Kookmin Bank and four other South Korean banks have frozen Prince Group's deposits. Lee Ok-won, chairman of the Financial Services Commission of South Korea, told the National Assembly that the Commission would swiftly impose sanctions on Prince Group. Just before the U.S. and UK announced sanctions against Prince Group, a South Korean university student was kidnapped and tortured to death by a Cambodian criminal group, which sparked outrage among the South Korean public. As a result, the South Korean government dispatched a task force led by Vice Foreign Minister Kim Jin-ah and National Security Advisor Wi Sung- lok to Cambodia to assist in the rescue and repatriation of South Korean citizens who were forced to participate in fraud, and issued a "black alert" level travel ban on parts of Cambodia.
- Taiwan: Chang Jung-hsing, Director-General of the National Police Agency, revealed that Taiwan has taken the initiative to contact the Federal Bureau of Investigation regarding this case. The case is currently being investigated by the Taipei District Prosecutors Office of Taiwan. The Taipei City Investigation Office of the Investigation Bureau of the Ministry of Justice seized 26 luxury cars of various types belonging to the Prince Group, worth more than NT$400 million.
- United Kingdom British Foreign Secretary Yvette Cooper said that "The masterminds behind these horrific scam centres are ruining the lives of vulnerable people and buying up London homes to store their money", She pointed out that Britain and its American allies will "taking decisive action to combat the growing transnational threat posed by this network – upholding human rights, protecting British nationals and keeping dirty money off our streets." Minister of State for the Home Office David Hanson also condemned the move, saying "Fraudsters prey on the most vulnerable by stealing life savings, ruining trust, and devastating lives. We will not tolerate this."
- United States: U.S. Attorney General Pam Bondi said at a press conference: "Today’s action represents one of the most significant strikes ever against the global scourge of human trafficking and cyber-enabled financial fraud,." John Eisenberg, Assistant Attorney General for National Security Division, described Prince Group as "a criminal enterprise built on human suffering." FBI Director Kash Patel said in a statement: "Today the FBI and partners executed one of the largest financial fraud takedowns in history." Christopher Raia, Assistant Director in Charge of the FBI's New York Field Office, pointed out that Chen Zhi had been "forcing thousands to serve as trapped accomplices and targeting countless others for their wallets".

=== Prince Group ===
Prince Group claims that the claim that it has been a major source of funding for the ruling party in Cambodia is defamatory. Radio Free Asia attempted to contact Chen Zhi for an interview after the Wangcang County People's Court in Sichuan ruled against Prince Group, but was unsuccessful. Prince Group spokesman Gabriel Tan responded to the court's ruling, claiming that the company was a victim of identity theft and that someone was impersonating him to carry out illegal activities. Tan told Radio Free Asia that the company's "main focus is on investment and development in Cambodia" and that it was not involved in the allegations of money laundering activities in Singapore, Cuba, or Meng Island.

Following the joint announcement by the United States and the United Kingdom of sanctions against Prince Group and 146 individuals and entities, including its chairman Chen Zhi the BBC News and Agence France-Presse contacted Prince Group for comment but received no response.
