= Li Xiong (Huione Group) =

Chinese criminal and businessman

- 李雄
- Citizenship: China; Cambodia (Naturalized in 2018; revoked on 31 March 2026)
- Occupations: Businessman, former corporate executive
- Years active: 2015–2025 (Period of alleged criminal activity)
- Known for: Control of the Huione Group, Huione Pay, and Panda Commercial Bank; implicated in transnational telecommunications fraud and money laundering via the dark web
- Title: Chairman of Huione Group; Chairman and Controlling Shareholder (holding a 62% stake) of Huione Payment; Chairman of Pangda Commercial Bank
- Partners: Chen Zhi (Prince Group), Hun To (Business partnership and shareholding)
- Status: Case under investigation (compulsory criminal measures have been taken)
- Allegiance: Prince Group (alleged to be a core element)
- Criminal charges: Crime of opening a casino, crime of fraud, crime of illegal business operation, crime of covering up and concealing criminal proceeds
- Capture status: Arrested and repatriated to stand trial
- Wanted by: Ministry of Public Security

Details
- Span of crimes: 2015–2025
- Country: Cambodia, China
- Locations: Phnom Penh and Prey Veng Province in Cambodia, including "Compound 8" (Huione Compound)
- Targets: Victims of global online scams; funds involved in transnational telecommunications fraud and money laundering in Southeast Asia
- Date apprehended: 27–28 March 2026 (Rented accommodation in Phnom Penh, Cambodia); Officially escorted back to China on 1 April 2026

Li Xiong (Khmer: លី សុង, Chinese: 李雄) is a Chinese criminal and businessman who obtained Cambodian citizenship in 2018, which was later revoked in 2026. He was the chairman of Huione Group, a shareholder of Huione Pay PLC, and the chairman or president of Panda Commercial Bank. According to the liquidation agency report, he held approximately 62% of Huione Pay's shares. The Ministry of Public Security of China has accused Li Xiong of being a core member of the Chen Zhi's Prince Group, suspected of operating casinos, fraud, illegal business operations, and concealing and covering up the proceeds of crime; a spokesperson for Cambodia's Ministry of Interior said that the accusations involve the period from 2015 to 2025, and that most of the cases occurred in China.

The Huione Group has been accused by regulatory agencies in the United States and other countries of being involved in the transfer of funds from fraud activities and cybercrimes in Southeast Asia. The Financial Crimes Enforcement Network of the United States Department of the Treasury has listed Huione as a major money laundering concern, stating that the group received at least US$4 billion in illegal proceeds between August 2021 and January 2025, including proceeds from fraud and funds related to North Korean hackers. China has identified Huione Group as belonging to the Prince Group system; the U.S. authorities have imposed sanctions on Prince Group and Huione respectively, but have not publicly confirmed the subordinate relationship between the two.

Huione Payment's Cambodian business license was revoked in 2024. Subsequently, the company experienced shutdowns, bank runs, and users demanding repayments. The National Bank of Cambodia stated that it was difficult to directly recognize users' claims under the Banking Law and suggested that the matter be handled through judicial procedures. Pangda Commercial Bank was also subsequently revoked and entered liquidation proceedings. Cambodia's independent media, CamboJA News, quoted the Cambodian Ministry of Interior as saying that Li Xiong was arrested in a rented house in Phnom Penh from 27 to 28 March 2026. His Cambodian citizenship was revoked on 31 March and he was escorted back to China from Phnom Penh by a working group from China's Ministry of Public Security on 1 April. The case is still under investigation and Li Xiong has been subjected to coercive measures.

== Biography and business network ==
Li Xiong was originally a citizen of China, and naturalized as a Cambodian citizen in 2018. The public security authorities of China reported that he had served as the chairman of Huione Group and listed him as a core member of Chen Zhi's criminal group; the U.S. authorities imposed sanctions on Prince Group and Huione-related entities respectively.

A report published by the liquidation firm Reachs & Partners shows that Li Xiong holds about 62% of the shares of Huione Payment. Related reports also indicate that he once served as the chairman or chairman of Huione Payment. Hun To, the cousin of Cambodian Prime Minister Hun Manet, later admitted that he held about 30% of the shares of Huione Payment and was listed on the company's online business registration list of directors; Hun To issued a statement saying that he did not participate in the actual operation of the company and had never received any profits, dividends or remaining funds after liquidation.

Li Xiong also attended public events of Pangda Commercial Bank as chairman or chairman, and his identity was also reported in the media. Huione's subsidiaries are involved in payment, e-commerce and cryptocurrency businesses, and also provide acquiring services for daily consumption in Cambodia; on the other hand, the Financial Crimes Enforcement Network of the United States Department of the Treasury and other agencies have alleged that the group and its affiliates were used as channels for transferring and laundering illegal funds such as proceeds from fraud in Southeast Asia.

== Criminal charges and money laundering investigation ==
The public security authorities of China have alleged that Li Xiong is a core member of Chen Zhi's criminal gang and have reported that he is suspected of operating casinos, fraud, illegal business operations, and concealing and covering up the proceeds of crime. A spokesperson for the Cambodian Ministry of Interior stated that the allegations involve cases from 2015 to 2025, most of which occurred in China; the above allegations are all made by the relevant authorities and the cases are still under investigation.

In 2025, the Financial Crimes Enforcement Network of the U.S. Treasury Department listed Huione Group as a major money laundering target, stating that the group received at least US$4 billion in illegal proceeds between August 2021 and January 2025, with the funds originating from Southeast Asian fraud parks and funds related to North Korean hackers. The New York Times reported that Huione's affiliated companies, in addition to providing legitimate financial services such as daily acquiring, were also accused of providing customized money transfer services and operating an online platform for criminals and money launderers to find trading partners Elliptic, a blockchain intelligence analysis agency, as saying that by the spring of 2025, the transaction amount facilitated by the online platform alone had reached nearly US$27 billion, but some of these transactions may involve legitimate activities. An investigative report by HK01 indicated that Huione's “Huione Guarantee” and “Haowang Guarantee” had sold dummy accounts through channels such as Telegram, and called Huione one of the world's largest dark web trading platforms.

Another investigation report linked Huione Payment, Huione Logistics and Pangda Commercial Bank to "No. 8 Park" in Prey Veng Province, Cambodia. Cambodian data shows that the park was completed in 2023 and a large number of foreigners entered from 2024. By 2025, the number of people reached nearly 20,000, mainly from China, Pakistan, India and Nepal. The United Kingdom subsequently sanctioned Legend Innovation, the park's operating company, and pointed out that the park was related to Prince Group and was one of the largest fraud parks in Cambodia.

== Criminal charges and extradition ==
The National Bank of Cambodia revoked the business license of Huione Payment in September 2024. Subsequently, the company entered liquidation proceedings, which were completed on June 19, 2025, according to The Cambodia China Times. Further reports indicated that the company was subsequently deregistered by the Cambodian Ministry of Commerce and was no longer a legal business entity. A report by the liquidation firm Reachs & Partners stated that the liquidation of Huione Payment was completed in October 2025. After repaying creditors, the company still had more than US$1.1 million in net cash, which was distributed to "the actual shareholders responsible for the company's past operations." Hong Du later stated that he did not receive any of the remaining funds after the liquidation. In December 2025, Huione Payment announced the suspension of operations, and there were cases of runs and users demanding payment. The National Bank of Cambodia stated that since the company's license has been revoked, the liquidation and deregistration process has been completed, and cryptocurrency trading is prohibited in Cambodia, it is impossible to confirm the user's claims under the Banking and Financial Institutions Law, and suggested that the matter be handled through the courts. Pangda Commercial Bank was subsequently deregistered by the National Bank of Cambodia in February 2026 and ceased all business operations. It was then liquidated under the supervision of a designated institution.

According to CamboJA News, citing the Ministry of the Interior, Cambodia took action at the request of China, and said that the action had been in preparation for several months. Li Xiong was arrested in a rented house in Phnom Penh on 27 to 28 March 2026, and the legal proceedings were subsequently handled by China. The Royal Decree issued on 31 March 2026, revoked his Cambodian citizenship. On 1 April 2026, a working group from the Ministry of Public Security of China, with the assistance of Cambodia, escorted Li Xiong back to China from Phnom Penh. China said it had taken coercive measures against him and the case was still under further investigation. Footage from official media of China showed him being escorted off the plane in handcuffs by police officers.
