= Pig butchering scam =

Type of investment fraud

- Simplified Chinese: 杀猪盘
- Traditional Chinese: 殺豬盤
- Literal meaning: Killing pig plate
Transcriptions
Standard Mandarin
- Hanyu Pinyin: Shā zhū pán

A pig-butchering scam or romance baiting scam is a form of online relationship and investment fraud in which perpetrators cultivate fake romantic or social relationships with victims before persuading them to invest money, often in fraudulent cryptocurrency schemes. Such scams are common on social media and dating apps, and often involve catfishing, investment fraud, and romance scams.

== Modus operandi ==
Pig-butchering scams involve engaging unsuspecting people online, cultivating trust, and persuading victims to invest, often in fraudulent cryptocurrency schemes that may use fake websites designed to resemble legitimate trading platforms and sometimes provide apparent initial returns to create a false sense of legitimacy.

Contact begins with unsolicited telephone calls with extended or repeated contact, fake profiles on dating apps, or romantic interest from strangers, all with requests for personal information with the aim to financially profile the target. After gaining the victim's trust, the scammer offers too-good-to-be-true rates of return on trades or investments using genuine-looking but fraudulent websites or apps. The scammer may pressure the victim to invest quickly, offer extravagant gifts which require the release of money, claim difficulties in withdrawing funds from supposed investment returns, and give inconsistent or vague details about the investment. A scammer will often try to isolate their victim by monopolizing their attention away from loved ones, who may otherwise realize the victim is falling prey to a scam.

Perpetrators are typically victims of a fraud factory, where they are lured to travel internationally under false pretenses, trafficked to another location, and forced to commit the fraud by organized crime gangs.

== History ==
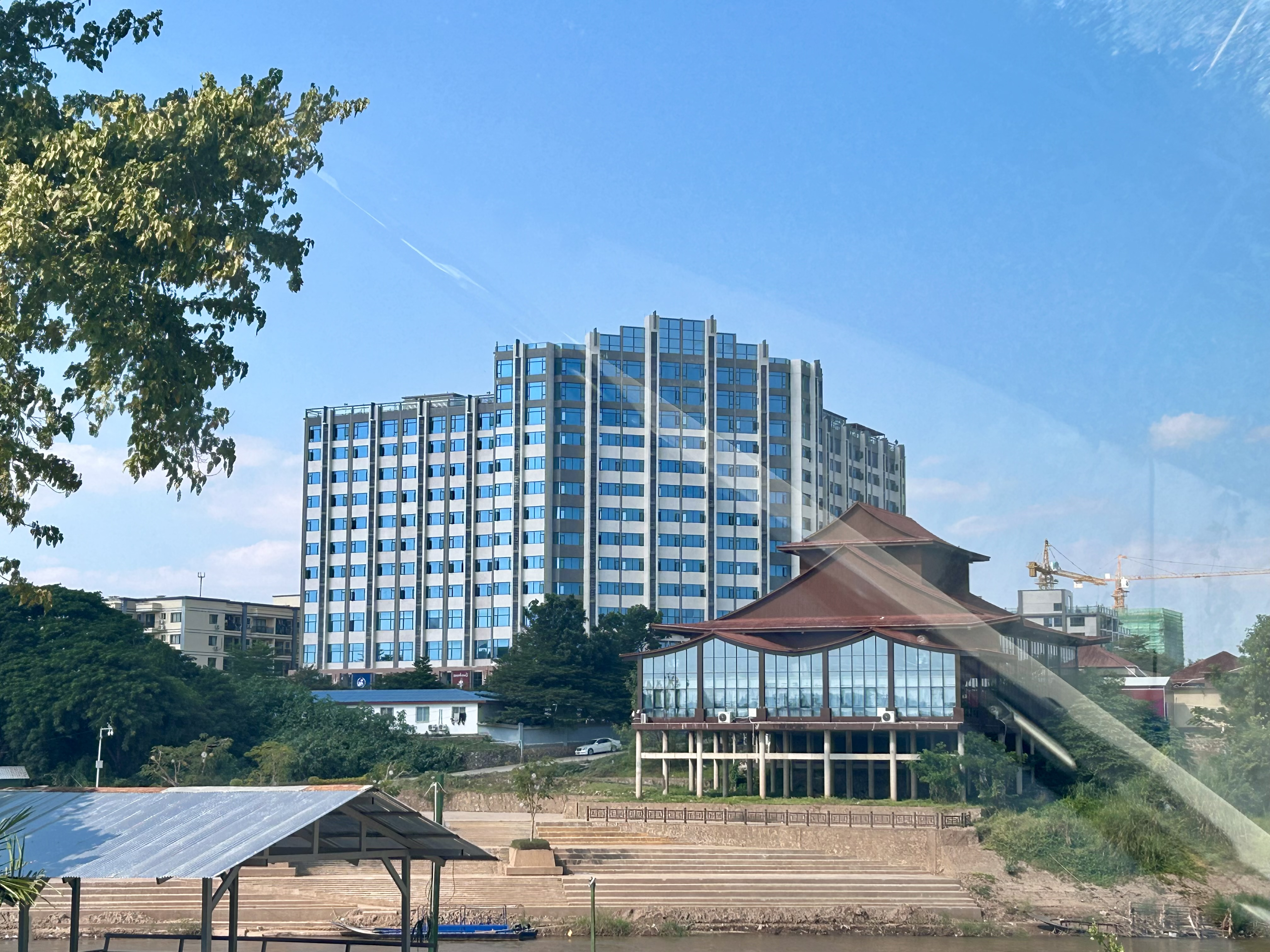
A scam center in Shwe Kokko, Myanmar, where perpetrators of pig-butchering scams are held against their will

Pig-butchering scams originated in 2016 or earlier as a regional scam in China, originally finding their victims on same-sex dating sites before expanding to opposite-sex dating sites as well. The term "pig butchering" arises from an analogy comparing the initial phase of gaining the victims' trust to the fattening of pigs before slaughtering them.

The modus operandi later spread throughout Southeast Asia at the height of the COVID-19 pandemic. In Sihanoukville, Cambodia—once a prosperous gambling town—many local gambling gangs transformed casinos into scam operation centers performing pig-butchering scams. This was likely a result of a lack of casino attendance on account of the COVID-19 pandemic and the Cambodian government cracking down on commercial gambling. Many operations are also run from areas of Myanmar which are outside central government control because of the ongoing civil war, with one important hub being the town of Myawaddy in Kayin State, near the border with Thailand. According to the UN Human Rights Office, hundreds of thousands of people have been trafficked and are trapped in scam centers in Cambodia and Myanmar, with other operations being run from Laos, the Philippines and Thailand. Many of the groups that run pig-butchering scams are overseas Chinese criminal syndicates based in Southeast Asia, who traffic ethnic Chinese and others into fraud factories and force these people to commit the fraud.

Pig-butchering scams gained international momentum through the exploitation of online dating apps and social media platforms. Scammers crafted elaborate fake identities to establish romantic or emotional connections with victims, thus marking a departure from conventional financial scams by integrating psychological manipulation. This early phase of these scams primarily targeted local populations but quickly expanded as digital connectivity grew.

The scams evolved significantly with the integration of sophisticated techniques, including the creation of fake online investment platforms and the use of social engineering. A key aspect of this evolution was the use of cryptocurrency for transactions, which appealed to scammers due to its difficulty to trace and recover. The scams' globalization can be attributed to the increased ubiquity of digital interactions and the rising popularity of cryptocurrencies, which provided a new avenue for such fraudulent activities on a global scale.

Some law enforcement agencies and online safety groups refer to the practice as romance baiting. In 2024, Interpol recommended the use of that term, considering pig butchering to be unhelpfully stigmatizing, and likely to deter victims from coming forward.

== Impact ==
=== Financial losses ===
Chainalysis estimated that cryptocurrency fraud totaled about US$12.4 billion in 2024, and reported that pig-butchering scams grew year over year. In October 2023, 12% of Americans using dating apps reported having experienced exposure to this type of fraud, up from 5% in 2018.

=== Cases of pig butchering ===
The 2023 failure of Heartland Tri-State Bank in Elkhart, Kansas, United States, may have been tied to a pig-butchering scam; CEO Shan Hanes was discovered to have embezzled $47 million from the bank in an attempt to secure funds. Hanes was charged in federal court with embezzlement in February 2024 and pleaded guilty in May 2024. He was later sentenced to 24 years in prison.

== Countermeasures ==
The IRS has issued warnings about the rising prevalence of these scams, particularly targeting U.S. taxpayers. The agency notes that losses often reach hundreds of thousands of dollars, with some victims losing as much as $2 million.

An important aspect of countering pig-butchering scams involves tracing stolen cryptocurrencies. This process is intricate due to the decentralized and pseudo-anonymous nature of cryptocurrencies, and requires specialized tools and knowledge. In 2022, for example, the FBI set up the Virtual Assets Unit, with the express remit of addressing cryptocurrency-based financial crime.

During the 2025 Cambodian–Thai conflict, Thai forces shelled scam centers in Cambodia.

In September 2025, the United States Department of the Treasury sanctioned a group of companies and individuals involved in operating scam centers in Myanmar and Cambodia.

In October 2025, the US Department of Justice indicted the Prince Group of Cambodia and its founder and chairman Chen Zhi on wire fraud conspiracy and money laundering charges related to operating at least ten scam centers in Cambodia. The Treasury’s Financial Crimes Enforcement Network identified Cambodia-based Huione Group as a "primary money laundering concern" and proposed measures intended to restrict its access to the U.S. financial system, citing cyber scams and heists. Businessman Hun To, cousin of Cambodian Prime Minister Hun Manet, has been identified as a director of Huione Pay within the group. Elliptic described Huione Guarantee as a Telegram-based marketplace widely used by online scammers, and Telegram later said it had blocked Huione Guarantee in 2025.

In January 2026, Chen was arrested by Cambodian authorities and extradited to China on the latter's request. Later in the same month, they took into custody Ly Kuong, a casino and real-estate tycoon, and charged him with scam-related crimes. Following these arrests, thousands of workers were released from scam compounds across Cambodia. More than 2,750 Indonesian workers sought embassy support to return home in the days following this.

== Consequences ==
The scam typically combines elements of romance and investment fraud, and often involves the gradual building of a relationship with the victim, leading to significant financial losses. Victims are lured into investing in fake opportunities, particularly with cryptocurrencies, and end up losing large sums of money. The psychological impact is equally severe, as victims not only face financial ruin but also the loss of what they perceived as a genuine, intimate relationship. Psychology Today reported that these types of scams are particularly insidious because they play on both the financial aspirations and emotional needs of individuals, leaving victims feeling betrayed, embarrassed, and reluctant to discuss their experience with others or report it to authorities.

== In popular culture ==
The 2023 Chinese movie No More Bets is a crime drama based on interviews with real victims of the scams. It garnered attention and success in China, bringing the scams and the issues related to them to the forefront of public discourse. The movie highlights the plight of the numerous low-level scammers who are themselves victims of coercion, having been lured from their homes by promises of stable employment, only to find themselves trapped and forced into committing these scams.

== See also ==
- Advance-fee scam – Type of confidence trick fraud
- Romance scam – Confidence trick using romantic intentions
- Internet fraud – Fraud or deception using the Internet
- Social engineering (security) – Psychological manipulation in information security
- Cryptocurrency and crime
