= Liu Ren =

Chinese criminal, businessman and former overseas Chinese leader

- 劉忍
- Born: 1977 (age 48–49); Liugouzhuang, Shaba Village, Huangwan Town, Lingbi County, Anhui, China
- Citizenship: China
- Occupations: Businessman, Overseas Community Leader
- Years active: Since 2000
- Organizations: Jinbei Group; Golden Bay 3, Sihanoukville (identified by Cambodian media as having one of the major shareholders); President of the Anhui General Chamber of Commerce in Cambodia (reported to have held the position since the Chamber's establishment in 2015, through 2026); Overseas Member of the Anhui Provincial Committee of the Chinese People's Political Consultative Conference
- Known for: Identified by the Chinese side as a key person in charge of the Jinbei Group; Identified by the Chinese side as a key operative of the Chen Zhi criminal syndicate (associated with the Prince Group transnational criminal organization).
- Partners: Alleged to be acting under the direction of Chen Zhi (Prince Group)
- Status: Compulsory criminal measures have been taken; the case is currently under investigation.
- Conviction: None (Not yet sentenced)
- Criminal charges: Telecommunications and internet fraud, the operation of online gambling, illegal detention, and intentional injury; Sing Tao Daily and Cambodian media, citing local law enforcement, further indicated that the cases also involve money laundering, human trafficking, kidnapping/extortion, and weapons—details that were not included in the notification provided by the Chinese side in June.
- Capture status: Arrested in Cambodia and repatriated to China
- Wanted by: Ministry of Public Security (dispatched a task force to escort [the individual] back to the country)
- Comments: After Chen Zhi was apprehended in January 2026, Liu Ren left the country (reportedly for Malaysia) before subsequently returning to Phnom Penh.

Details
- Span of crimes: 2016 – 2026 (arrested and brought back)
- Country: Cambodia; according to the Chinese side, the victims include citizens within the territory of China.
- Locations: Huangshan International Building, Phnom Penh (place of arrest); Sihanoukville (Location of the investment/industrial park mentioned in the report)
- Targets: The Chinese side alleges the recruitment of citizens within China for gambling and the execution of telecommunications fraud.
- Date apprehended: Arrested in Phnom Penh, Cambodia, on 5 June 2026; Handed over and escorted out of Cambodia on 10 June 2026

Liu Ren (Khmer: លីវ យិន, Chinese: 刘忍; born 1977) is a Chinese criminal, businessman and former overseas Chinese leader. Liu served as a key member of the Prince Group, and also established Jinbei Group.

Liu was orn in 1977 in Anhui. He went to Cambodia to do business in 2000. Initially, he engaged in small commodity trade, and later gradually expanded into catering, real estate and construction. It is reported that he purchased a lot of land and made investments in Phnom Penh and Sihanoukville. Since 2015, Liu served as the president of the Anhui General Chamber of Commerce in Cambodia and was appointed as an overseas member of Anhui Provincial Committee of the Chinese People's Political Consultative Conference. He was involved in the activities of local Chinese business associations.

According to a report from the Ministry of Public Security of China, Liu was identified as a key member of Chen Zhi's transnational criminal group. The Chinese side stated that Liu participated in the establishment of Jinbei Group under the instruction of Chen in 2016. In the early stage, he mainly operated multiple online gambling platforms and recruited Chinese citizens to participate in gambling. Since 2020, he has been operating a telecommunications fraud park in Cambodia, involving telecommunications network fraud with particularly large sums of money, and is suspected of illegal detention and intentional injury. The Cambodian law enforcement investigation pointed out that his related group was suspected of engaging in human trafficking, kidnapping and arms smuggling. Cambodian media reported that after Chen Zhi was arrested in January 2026, Liu Ren went to Malaysia, then returned to Cambodia, and was arrested in Phnom Penh on 5 June 2026. On 10 June 2026, he was transferred and escorted back to China for investigation.

== Early life and career ==
Liu Ren was born in Liugouzhuang Village, Shaba Village, Huangwan Town, Lingbi County, Anhui, China, in 1977. In 2000, he went to Cambodia to do business. Initially, he mainly traveled between Cambodia and Yiwu in Zhejiang, engaging in the wholesale and retail of daily necessities such as toothbrushes and toothpaste. Later, he opened a restaurant in the local area and expanded his business to the construction engineering and real estate sectors. It is reported that he purchased a number of lands in Phnom Penh and Sihanoukville and gradually became a well-known businessman in the local Chinese community.

After the establishment of the Anhui General Chamber of Commerce in Cambodia in 2015, Liu Ren served as its president; subsequent reports also referred to him as president. According to the Sing Tao Daily, he had assisted in receiving official delegations from various levels of China to Cambodia on many occasions, and served as an overseas member of the Anhui Provincial Committee of the Chinese People's Political Consultative Conference. For many years, he participated in related activities as a leader of overseas Chinese businessmen; the report also pointed out that he had been reported by name by outsiders on many occasions in recent years, and was accused of being involved in controlling a large transnational criminal group.

== Fugitive status, arrest and repatriation ==
According to Cambodian media reports, Liu left Cambodia during Chen Zhi’s arrest in Phnom Penh and his transfer to China in January 2026. The Khmer Times reported that Liu went to Malaysia to avoid arrest and then returned to Phnom Penh.

On 5 June 2026, the Sing Tao Daily reported that Liu was taken away by local law enforcement at the Huangshan International Building in Phnom Penh. The Khmer Times quoted Cambodia’s anti-cyber fraud department as saying that law enforcement took action on the 47th floor of the Huangshan International Building near Diamond Island in the Chamkarmon district of Phnom Penh that day, arresting Liu and other suspects from China involved in the case, and seizing mobile phones, computers and other items allegedly used for online fraud and extortion.

The Khmer Times quoted an official from the General Department of Immigration as saying that the Cambodian National Police handed Liu over to the Chinese side on 10 June 2026, and that Chinese personnel took him away from Cambodia by chartered plane that night. On 17 June 2026, China's Ministry of Public Security and China Central Television issued a notice and escort footage, indicating that Liu had been taken into custody in accordance with the law and the case was under further investigation. The same notice also stated that the Ministry of Public Security had deployed more than ten provinces and cities, including Shanxi, Shandong, Hunan, Chongqing, Sichuan, Guizhou, and Gansu, to carry out investigations in response to the telecommunications network fraud cases involving China in Cambodia.

== Hired murder case ==
In 2024, an unidentified individual using the online alias "Major" (also known as "Brother Tai") posted a recruitment notice on Telegram offering a reward of ¥300,000 renminbi for the abduction of self-media personality Huijian (real name Wu Kai). Wu had previously published articles on his personal WeChat public account detailing the illegal activities of Liu, including using casinos for violent loan sharking, beating a renovation company owner to death, extorting protection money from shops, operating a telecom fraud industrial park, and engaging in armed transnational criminal activities. In November 2024, Zhao Bing, hired by Liu, gathered more than ten people and traveled to Daya Bay District, Huizhou, to abduct Wu, demanding that Major increase the reward to ¥1 million renminbi. The group eventually took Wu to Dingnan County, Jiangxi, where they beat him in a grassy area on a mountain before abandoning him there. His body was discovered by local villagers two days later. Within half a month of the incident, more than ten people involved in the case were apprehended or surrendered. In December 2025, the Huizhou Intermediate People's Court issued a first-instance judgment on the case, finding the main culprit Zhao Bing guilty of intentional injury and sentencing him to death with a two-year reprieve. More than ten other defendants were sentenced to prison terms ranging from eight years to one year and three months. Some of the defendants appealed, but their appeals were rejected by the Guangdong Provincial Higher People's Court in August 2026. As of the time the case was disclosed by the media, Major was still at large.
