= Hu Xiaowei =

Sanctioned individual (TCO)

- 胡小偉
- Born: Hu Xiaowei; May 1982 (age 44); Suqian, Jiangsu, China
- Other names: Chen Xiaoer/Chen Xiao'er (陳小二); Wu An Ming (胡晏銘); Hu Shi (胡石); Hu Echo
- Citizenship: China; Cambodia (naturalized in 2020); Cyprus; Saint Kitts and Nevis
- Alma mater: Suqian High School; Chongqing University (Graduated in 2005)
- Occupation: Businessman
- Years active: 2007–2026
- Organizations: "Knight Attack Group"; Prince Group
- Known for: Described by the U.S. Department of the Treasury as the "number two" figure in the Prince Group, with Chen Zhi reportedly regarding him as his "big brother."; Listed by the UK as a long-term associate of Chen Zhi
- Title: Advisor to the President of the National Assembly of Cambodia (reportedly equivalent to ministerial rank)
- Term: From 2022 (source for end date not specified)
- Board member of: Hailian Engineering Investment Co., Ltd. (registered in Hong Kong in 2011 under the name Chen Xiao'er); Chairman of Jiuxi Yun (Chongqing) Financial Leasing Co., Ltd.; Tokuten Shoji Ltd. (Tokyo; Representative Director)
- Partners: Chen Zhi
- Convictions: Japan: Offenses Related to False Registration of Residence and Immigration Control (Summary Procedure)
- Criminal charges: China: Crime of illegal business operations (online gambling via unauthorized private servers) and crime of illegally intruding into computer information systems; fled following the incident.; US and UK: Links to the Prince Group’s transnational fraud, money laundering, and related criminal networks.; Japan: Causing a public official to make a false entry and uttering the false document; violation of the *Immigration Control and Refugee Recognition Act*.
- Penalty: Fine under Japan's summary procedure (reported by World Journal to be approximately ¥100,000 renminbi)
- Capture status: Arrested in Osaka, Japan, on June 14, 2026; subsequently reported to have left Japan and been sent to the United States.
- Wanted by: United States: Targets of Sanctions by the Department of the Treasury's Office of Foreign Assets Control; United Kingdom: Targets of Sanctions by the Foreign Office and the Home Office; Singapore: Subject of an investigation by the Singapore Police Force (reports indicate the individual had already left the country prior to the operation in October 2025)

Details
- Country: Cambodia; China; Hong Kong; Singapore; Japan; United Kingdom
- Date apprehended: June 14, 2026 (Osaka City, Osaka Prefecture, Japan)
- Imprisoned at: United States

Notes
- Hu also holds a Hong Kong identity card; The Straits Times further reported that he holds a Hong Kong passport.

Hu Xiaowei (Chinese: 胡小伟; born 1 May 1982), also known by the aliases Chen Xiaoer, Wu An Ming and Hu Shi, is a Chinese criminal, hacker and businessman who was affiliated with the Prince Group. He holds a passport from China, Cambodia, Cyprus and Saint Kitts and Nevis, and a Hong Kong identity card.

Born in Suqian, Jiangsu, China, Hu was involved in cases related to the "Knight Attack Group" network private server and illegal intrusion into computer systems in China in his early years. The Ministry of Public Security of China listed the case as a key case for supervision in 2010. When the case was closed in May 2011, reports indicated that other people involved in the case had been arrested, while Hu had fled the country, eventually moving to Cambodia in 2016. Subsequently, Zhang Gangyao, a former senior executive of the Prince Group, told the Organized Crime and Corruption Reporting Project that Hu had brought Chen Zhi, the main culprit in the Prince Group case, into the online gambling industry, and Chen Zhi called Hu "Big Brother"; the United States Department of the Treasury described Hu as the "second-in-command" of the Prince Group, while some Japanese media called him the "strategist". The U.S. sanctions document indicated that Hu established and supervised multiple related entities outside Cambodia, involving aviation, real estate and Hong Kong finance businesses. Since 2011, Hu has been engaged in business activities in Hong Kong under different aliases. In 2018, he took over a Hong Kong listed company as "Chen Xiaoer" and became its chairman; reports indicate that he subsequently purchased properties in Hong Kong and the United Kingdom and owned multiple aircraft through a Hong Kong company. In 2022, he was appointed as an advisor to Heng Samrin, the President of the National Assembly of Cambodia.

The United States and the United Kingdom have listed Prince Group as a transnational criminal organization since October 2025 and imposed sanctions on related individuals and entities. Hu was already on the U.S. sanctions list under the alias "Chen Xiaoer" at that time, and the United Kingdom and the United States subsequently announced several of his aliases and related companies. The Hong Kong High Court has frozen the assets of Chen Zhi, Hu Xiaowei and Li Tian, totaling approximately HK$8.9 billion; Singapore Police Force have frozen hundreds of millions of assets during their investigation of the Prince Group case and stated that they had seized Hu's bank and securities accounts in Singapore. On 14 June 2026, Hu, who holds a "highly skilled professional" residence status in Japan, was arrested in Osaka for allegedly submitting a false immigration declaration. He was later arrested again for allegedly violating the Immigration Control and Refugee Recognition Act and was fined by the Japanese authorities through a summary procedure. According to Japanese media reports, he left Japan on 29 July 2026 and was extradited to the United States.

== Early life ==
Hu Xiaowei was born in Suqian, Jiangsu in 1982. He studied at Suqian Middle School in Jiangsu in his early years and donated money to his alma mater in 2016. In 2005, after graduating from Chongqing University, he stayed in Chongqing and worked as the marketing manager of Internet data center business in a local electronics company. In early 2007, Cai Wen, the main culprit in the "Knight Group" private server and illegal computer intrusion case, rented a server from the company where Hu worked, and the two became acquainted.

== Criminal career ==
=== The "Knight Attack Group" (2008–2011) ===
In November 2008, Cai Wen was wanted online by the Xiantao City Public Security Bureau in Hubei for suspected illegal business operations. He then fled to Chongqing and recruited Hu to resume the advertising agency business of the private server of The Legend of Mir 2. The report indicated that after the two reorganized their business, they bribed the computer room with anti-attack capabilities. The computer room managers of "Data China" and "Qunying Network" cut off the network cable of the designated server according to the instructions, forcing the publishing station that was unwilling to hand over the advertising agency rights to stop operating. Cai Wen and Hu also set up four private server advertising publishing stations on their own. Hu confessed to the Huangshi police in Hubei that in the second half of 2009, the daily amount of money coming in and out of "Knight" reached hundreds of thousands of renminbi. The Times Weekly called Cai Wen and Hu the two "big brothers" of the gang. The report later indicated that Chen Zhi was a member of the group, but was not included in the list of 19 core arrest targets announced in 2011. Zhang Gangyao, a former senior executive of the Prince Group, told the Organized Crime and Corruption Reporting Project that Hu had brought Chen Zhi into the online gambling industry.

At the end of 2009, Chen Rongfeng, an informant from the audit department of Shanda in Shanghai, intervened in the incident. According to the confessions of Gao Yunwu and others, the person in charge of the server room, since January 2010, the profits from the publishing station were split 20% each by Chen Rongfeng and Gao Yunwu, and the remaining 60% were split equally by Cai Wen and Hu. From January to November 2010, Cai Wen and Hu transferred a total of about ¥18 million renminbi to Gao Yunwu. Chen Rongfeng claimed that he later obtained relevant authorization from Shanda through "Qiancun Network" and participated in the profit sharing after Hu took over the publishing station. Shanda denied the existence of "legalization of private servers". Some insiders also claimed that the authorization was actually set up to crack down on private server publishing stations. After the task force launched a crackdown, the gang was accused of illegally profiting more than ¥100 million renminbi in a short period of time. The police also seized assets involved in the case, such as a villa in Huixing Town, Chongqing, an office building in the Fortune Center in the Northern New Area, and many luxury cars. The report indicated that prior to the Chongqing case, the organization had been investigated in Xiantao, Hubei and Gaoyou and Danyang, Jiangsu. However, Cai Wen and Hu, among other members involved in the case, were granted bail after paying bail of ¥5 million renminbi, ¥10 million renminbi, and ¥10 million renminbi respectively during the three investigations.

On 6 September 2010, the Cyber Security Protection Bureau of the Ministry of Public Security issued an instruction to the Chongqing Municipal Public Security Bureau's Cyber Security Corps regarding the case of the "Knight Attack Group" suspected of illegally intruding into computer systems, and listed the case as a key case for supervision. When the case was closed on 30 May 2011, it was reported that a total of 19 suspects were brought to justice, while Hu had fled abroad; HK01 later reported that Chen Zhi also fled with Hu after the incident.

=== Escape from abroad and overseas business networks (2011–2025) ===
After fleeing in 2011, Hu obtained Cambodian, Cypriot and Saint Kitts and Nevis passports, as well as a Hong Kong identity card, and engaged in business activities under aliases such as "Chen Xiaoer", "Hu Yanming" and "HU Shi". In the same year, he registered Hailian Engineering Investment Co., Ltd. in Hong Kong under the alias "Chen Xiaoer" and a resident identity card from Suqian, Jiangsu. In 2016, he moved to Cambodia. Hu's links to the gaming industry also put him into contact with Century Huatong. Wang Ji, the chair of Century Huatong, owned 51% of the Ningxia-based Zhenao Network, a company dissolved in 2017 where Hu was a director. In August 2018, he acquired a Hong Kong listed company under the alias "Chen Xiaoer" and became its major shareholder, while also serving as its chairman and CEO; in 2020, he changed his registration to "Hu Yanming", and sold all his shares in April 2021. In August 2020, a Cayman Islands limited partnership fund in which he participated purchased approximately 1.194% of the equity of Evergrande Property, which was not yet listed at the time, for HK$1 billion. In addition, he established a biotechnology company in Beijing in August 2016 under his real name and established a charitable foundation in Hong Kong in November 2018 under the same name; subsequently, he changed his name to "HU Shi" and registered with a Cypriot passport in the foundation's director information. The foundation was deregistered in January 2024; in July 2024, a Hong Kong businessman who had served as a director of the foundation with Hu acquired all the equity of the Beijing company through his company.

In terms of aviation business, the report indicated that Hu had registered companies such as "Nine Seal Cloud No. 1" to "No. 10" in Hong Kong and purchased French Dassault Falcon 8X, American Gulfstream G650ER, and several Airbus A319 and A320 aircraft through related companies. Some of these aircraft were leased to Cambodia Airways, a subsidiary of Prince Group. Gulfstream G650ER with registration number N9527C has carried former Cambodian Prime Minister Hun Sen on several occasions. In February 2023, during the flight of Falcon 8X with registration number T7-CLN from Manila to Dubai, Philippine Senator Grace Poe stated in the Congress of the Philippines that there were problems with the documents of some people on board, and that the aircraft was allowed to leave the country without completing the pre-flight inspection. She also questioned whether the incident might involve human trafficking.

In terms of property investment, Hu purchased a detached house in Ting Kau, Tsuen Wan, Hong Kong in 2018 under the name "Chen Xiaoer" through a company. After changing his name to "Hu Yanming" in 2020, he mortgaged the property to pay for a batch of jewelry worth about HK$130 million. After settling the relevant amount in 2025, he sold it for HK$62 million. In March 2022, he purchased a mansion near Holland Park in London for £30 million under the name "Hu Yanming". In the same year, he purchased a sports field at Imperial College London for £3.5 million through a British Virgin Islands company. In 2020, he obtained Cambodian citizenship. In 2022, he was appointed as an advisor to Heng Samrin, the President of the National Assembly of Cambodia. It was reported that the position was equivalent to a ministerial level.

=== Sanctions due to involvement in the Prince Group (2025–2026) ===
In 2025, many governments described Prince Group as a transnational criminal organization involved in fraudulent parks, forced labor and money laundering, and said that people trafficked to the relevant parks were forced to engage in investment fraud activities such as pig butchering scams. The United States Department of the Treasury listed Hu as the "second-in-command" of Prince Group and said that Chen Zhi called him "big brother"; the British government said that Hu was Chen Zhi's long-term partner and that he participated in Prince Group's financial network under multiple aliases. On 14 October 2025, the U.S. Treasury Department's Office of Foreign Assets Control and the British government simultaneously imposed sanctions on Prince Group and its related persons and entities; Hu was listed on the U.S. list at that time as "Chen Xiao Er" and was ranked at the top of the published list because of the alphabetical order of surnames. After Chen Zhi was arrested in Cambodia in January 2026 and repatriated to China, the United Kingdom added Hu and his aliases to the list of sanctioned entities on 26 March 2026, alleging that he participated in the operation of the Prince Group under three other aliases. On 23 June 2026, the United States imposed sanctions on nine individuals and 26 entities, and announced that the real name of "Chen Xiaoer" was Hu; the United States stated that he controlled British Virgin Islands companies such as Eagle Fortitude, Leisure Focus, and Future King, as well as Hong Kong entities such as Dongrong Wealth and Dongchu Securities. He Haoming, Jiang Jiaan, and Li Hui were also included in the sanctions list. The United States also stated that Dongrong Wealth had received millions of US dollars, and the relevant funds were assessed as possibly coming from victims of cryptocurrency investment fraud.

In May 2026, the Hong Kong High Court, in accordance with the Organized and Serious Crimes Ordinance, issued a restriction order on the assets of approximately 42 individuals and companies, including Chen Zhi, Hu, and Li Tian, at the request of the Department of Justice. The order involved approximately HK$8.93 billion, including bank deposits, properties, and shares of listed companies. Subsequent reports indicated that the restricted entities overlapping with the US sanctions list included some of the "Nine Clouds" aircraft leasing companies, Dongchu Securities, and Dongrong Wealth. On 23 June 2026, the Singapore Police Force stated that it was investigating Huand his associated company Future Oasis, and indicated that the authorities had seized his bank and securities accounts in Singapore in January 2026. The assets related to Qiu Dong (Qiu Wei Ren) mentioned in the report included real estate and bank accounts. Both individuals left Singapore before the relevant operations were launched in October 2025. Singapore authorities have reportedly seized or restricted more than S$600 million in cash and assets in connection with the Prince Group investigation.

=== Arrest in Japan and extradition to the United States (2026–) ===
The report indicated that Hu had been frequently traveling to and from Japan for about three years and obtained a "highly skilled professional" residency status in November 2023. In October 2025, he re-entered Japan and subsequently resided in luxury hotels and apartments in Tokyo and Osaka, and served as the representative director of a trading company in Tokyo. On 14 June 2026, the Tokyo Metropolitan Police Department and other departments arrested Hu in Osaka. At the time, he held a Cypriot passport and used the identity "HU Shi". The report indicated that the police discovered his whereabouts through CCTV footage from luxury hotels. Police said that in April 2026, he submitted a false relocation application to Chūō, Tokyo through two men of Chinese nationality, and was suspected of committing crimes such as making a public official submit false information; Hu said that he moved to the relevant address in order to obtain permanent residency and that the relevant procedures were handled by an agent.

On 5 July 2026, Hu was arrested again for allegedly violating the Immigration Control and Refugee Recognition Act. The Asahi Shimbun reported that he handed his residence card to a woman around 17 April, and then on 28 May another man took the card to Chūō Ward to register his seal; Chinese Television System and other reports said that the police believed one of his purposes was to obtain permanent residency in Japan. He denied some of the charges and said that he felt his life was threatened and wanted to find a safe place to live. Subsequently, Japanese media and the Organized Crime and Corruption Reporting Project reported that another man from Fujian had allowed Hu to stay temporarily and provided his company address as a contact address; the man said that he had nothing to do with the Prince Group and that Chinese authorities had issued an arrest warrant for Hu through Interpol because he was suspected of being involved in online gambling.

On 24 July 2026, Japanese prosecutors imposed a fine on Hu through a summary procedure; other reports indicate that the Federal Bureau of Investigation had contacted him through the Tokyo Metropolitan Police Department. According to Japanese media citing sources, Hu left Japan on 29 July and was extradited to the United States, where the subsequent investigation was conducted.
