= Wu Kai =

Chinese self-media creator

- 吴恺
- Born: February 2, 1974; Anqing, Anhui, China
- Died: November 11, 2024 (aged 50); Ganzhou, Jiangxi, China
- Cause of death: Beaten to death
- Known for: Anti-fraud activism

Wu Kai (Chinese: 吴恺; 2 February 1974 – 11 November 2024), also known online as Huijian, (Chinese: 徽剑) was a Chinese self-media creator.

Wu had become an anti-fraud activist online, publishing articles about telecommunications fraud in Southeast Asia, including Myanmar and Cambodia, in his WeChat account. In August 2024, Wu published articles accusing Liu Ren, a key member of the Prince Group in Cambodia and president of the Anhui Chamber of Commerce in Cambodia, of multiple criminal offenses. In October 2026 the Guangdong Provincial Higher People's Court made a criminal final ruling, revealing that Wu had been murdered by hired killers in November 2024.

== Biography ==
Wu Kai was born on 2 February 1974 Anqing, Anhui, China, with ancestral roots in Shexian County, Huangshan, Anhui. He worked in internet-related businesses in Shenzhen in his early years. In 2010, he founded Shenzhen Huijian Network Technology Co., Ltd., and served as the head of Nanshan Internet Industrial Park and Shenzhen Huishang Club. In 2012, he used the online name "Huijian" to expose the marital discord of real estate celebrity Wang Shi on Weibo, which was reported by media such as Global People and entered the public eye.

Wu had long exposed the inside story of telecommunications fraud in northern Myanmar and Cambodia through his WeChat public account, which had hundreds of thousands of followers. In August 2024, he publicly accused Liu Ren, an important member of the Prince Group in Cambodia and president of the Anhui Chamber of Commerce in Cambodia, of various crimes including being a casino loan shark, beating someone to death, extorting protection fees from shops, operating a fraud park, and engaging in armed transnational crimes. At that time, Liu denied the relevant accusations.

=== Murder ===
In mid-October 2024, Zhao Bing, one of the perpetrators, discovered through the instant messaging software Telegram that a person with the online name "Shaoxiao" (Chinese: 少校) posted a paid murder-for-hire task, with the reward eventually increasing to ¥1 million renminbi. The other party demanded that Wu be kidnapped, forced to reveal the source of his information, and compelled to delete the article exposing transnational criminal activities.

On the afternoon of 10 November 2024, Wu was abducted by several men in the Daya Bay Economic and Technological Development Zone of Huizhou, Guangdong. He was subsequently taken to Heyuan, Guangdong, and Ganzhou, Jiangxi, where he was beaten and forced to delete the articles. On the afternoon of 11 November, he was taken to a mountainous area in Dingnan County, Ganzhou, where he was kicked unconscious by Zhao, who sent a photo to Shaoxiao, and abandoned that night on a hillside beside a road in Longtang Town, Dingnan County. Zhao and his four accomplices split the ¥1 million renminbi reward. Two days later, at noon, villagers discovered his body and reported it to the police. On 29 December 2025, the Intermediate Huizhou City People's Court of Huizhou sentenced the principal offender Zhao Bing to death with a two-year reprieve for intentional injury, and the other participants were sentenced to prison terms. In August 2026, the Guangdong Provincial High People's Court upheld the original verdict in the second instance (final instance), but the overseas accomplice Shaoxiao had not yet been brought to justice; Zhao Bing handed Wu's mobile phone to a person named "Xie Yihui" arranged by Shaoxiao, and the judgment document showed that he was "at large".

On 27 October 2026, Jiemian News cited a criminal final ruling made by the Guangdong Provincial Higher People's Court to disclose that Wu had been murdered by hired killer in November 2024, his public account stopped updating, and at that time it was rumored that he was "arrested for extortion".
