= Chen Lip Keong =

Malaysian billionaire and businessman (1948–2023)

Yang Berbahagia Tan Sri Dato' Chen Lip Keong PSM DSSA DIMP JMN
- 曾立强
- Born: 22 July 1948; Kuala Lumpur, Federation of Malaya
- Died: 8 December 2023 (aged 75); U.S.
- Citizenship: Malaysia
- Education: MBBS
- Alma mater: University of Malaya
- Occupation: Businessman
- Years active: 1973–2023
- Known for: Founder of NagaCorp Ltd
- Title: CEO and Executive director of NagaCorp Ltd
- Spouse: Lee Chou Sarn
- Children: Chen Yiy Hwuan; Chen Yiy Fon; Chen Yepern

Chen Lip Keong (simplified Chinese: 曾立强; 22 July 1948 – 8 December 2023) was a Malaysian businessman with interests in integrated resorts, property and energy. Chen was known for founding the NagaWorld casino in Phnom Penh, the only integrated resort in Cambodia.

In 2022, Chen was the seventh-richest man in Malaysia.

== Early life and education ==
Chen was born in 1948 in Kuala Lumpur, the capital of Malaysia. Chen was of Chinese ethnicity. Chen grew up in Kinta Valley, Malaysia.

Chen graduated as a medical doctor from University of Malaya, but pursued a career in business.

== Career ==
Chen's career started as a medical doctor of general practice.

In 1994, Chen was the first to win the casino license from Cambodia.

Chen was the CEO of NagaCorp, parent company of NagaWorld casino resort complex in Phnom Penh. Chen also built Naga2, a twin tower. They are connected by NagaCity Walk, an underground shopping mall.

== Death ==
Chen Lip Keong died in the United States on 8 December 2023, at the age of 75.

== Honours ==
- Malaysia
  - Companion of the Order of the Defender of the Realm (JMN) (1990)
  - Commander of the Order of Loyalty to the Crown of Malaysia (PSM) – Tan Sri (1995)
- Pahang
  - Knight Companion of the Order of the Crown of Pahang (DIMP) – Dato'
- Selangor
  - Knight Companion of the Order of Sultan Salahuddin Abdul Aziz Shah (DSSA) – Dato' (1988)

== See also ==
- List of Malaysians of Chinese descent#Businesspeople
- NagaCorp
