= NagaCorp =

Cambodian gaming and hospitality company

NagaWorld in Phnom Penh

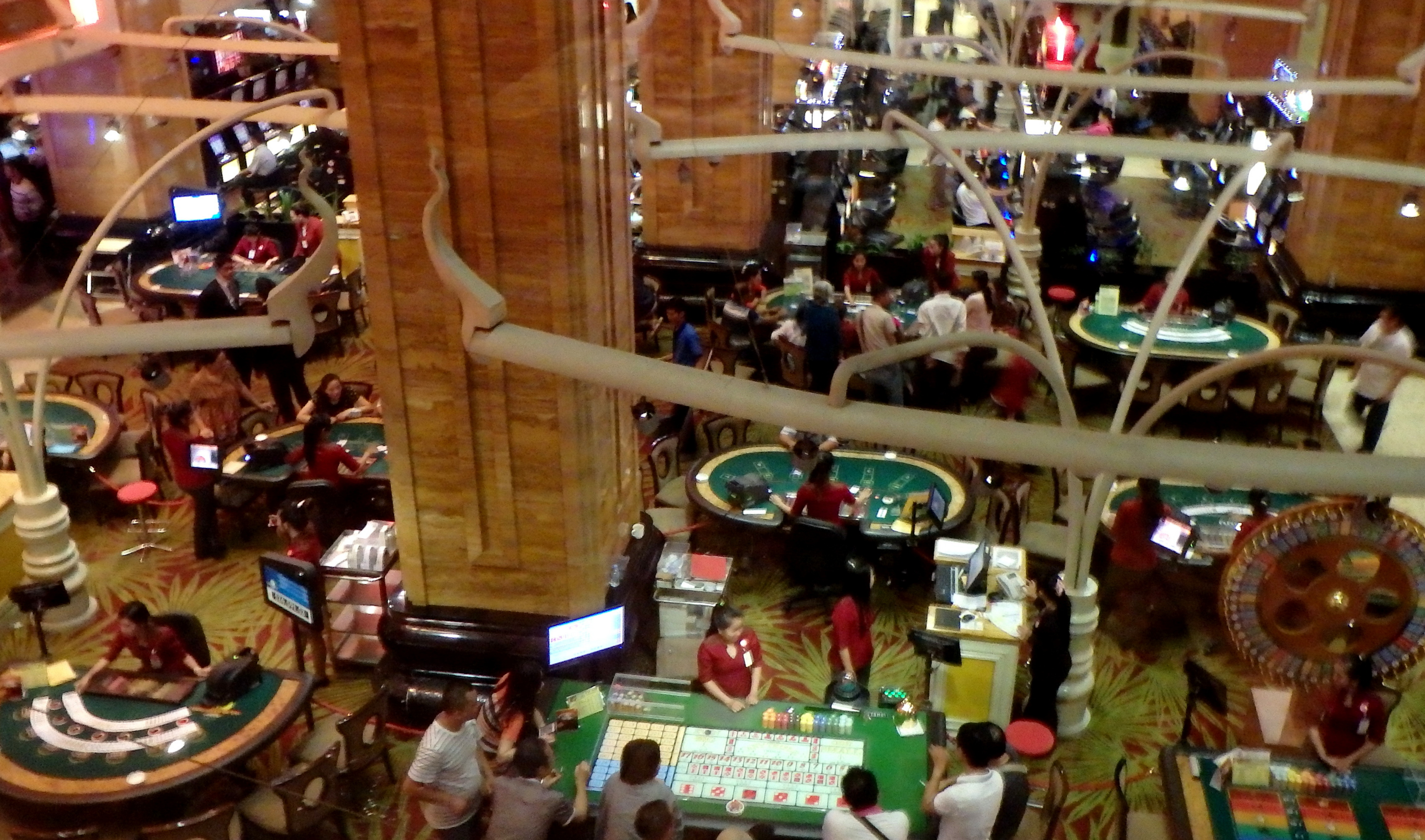
Nagaworld gambling floor in Phnom Penh

NagaCorp Ltd. (Chinese: 金界控股有限公司) (SEHK: 3918) is a Hong Kong-listed hotel, gambling and leisure company. Its Cambodian property, NagaWorld, is the country's largest hotel and gambling resort, and is Phnom Penh's only integrated hotel-casino entertainment complex. NagaCorp holds a 70-year casino licence in Cambodia which runs until 2065, and has a monopoly within a 200-kilometre (120 mi) radius of Phnom Penh (except the Cambodia-Vietnam border area, Bokor, Kirirom Mountains, and Sihanoukville) until 2045.

The Naga casino first opened on May 1, 1995 on a boat moored in the Mekong River in Phnom Penh. The casino moved to its current land-based facility in 2003. NagaCorp held its initial public offering on the Hong Kong Stock Exchange in 2006, making it the first gambling-related company to trade on the exchange, and the first company with operations in Cambodia to become publicly traded. Junket operator SunCity Group have a VIP Club located on Level 23 of Naga2 hotel tower in Phnom Penh.

The company is also developing a casino resort in Vladivostok, Russia.

== See also ==
- Gambling in Cambodia
- Chen Lip Keong
