= Huione Group =

Cambodian financial conglomerate

Huione Pay logo

Huione Group (Khmer: ហួយវ័ន គ្រុប, Chinese: 汇 旺 集团, romanized: Huìwàng jítuán) is a Cambodian financial conglomerate, headquartered in Phnom Penh. Some of its products and subsidiaries include Huione Pay (Chinese: 汇旺支付, romanized: Huìwàng zhīfù) (banking), Huione Guarantee (Chinese: 汇旺担保, romanized: Huìwàng dānbǎo) (an escrow and deposit service sometimes used as a grey market), and Huione Crypto (Chinese: 汇旺(加密货币)交易所, romanized: Huìwàng (jiāmì huòbì) jiāoyìsuǒ) (a cryptocurrency exchange). The company is linked to Cambodia's ruling Hun family, which includes the current prime minister, Hun Manet. His cousin Hun To is a major shareholder and director of Huione Pay.

== Money laundering charges ==
In July 2024, the blockchain analytics firm Elliptic linked Huione Guarantee to the sale of stolen data and money laundering services used to conduct illegal activities, such as the so-called pig butchering scam. In March 2025, the National Bank of Cambodia revoked Huione Pay's banking license. In May, the U.S. Department of the Treasury's Financial Crimes Enforcement Network found Huione Group to be a financial institution of primary money laundering concern and proposed to sever its access to the U.S. financial system. FinCEN reported that Huione Group laundered over US$4 billion in illegal funds from August 2021 to January 2025, including US$37 million from North Korean cyber heists and US$36 million from fraud scams. In May 2025, Telegram deleted thousands of channels used by Huione Guarantee and banned several accounts that had operated the marketplace. The marketplace, which had renamed itself Haowang Guarantee, then announced that it would cease operations. It has grown to become the largest criminal marketplace of all time, with transactions totalling more than $27 billion. In October 2025, FinCEN issued a final rule cutting Huione Group off from the U.S. financial system. It bars covered financial institutions from opening or maintaining correspondent accounts for the group.

In April 2026, Huione's former chairman Li Xiong was extradited to China to face money laundering charges. Chinese authorities described Huione as a subsidiary of Prince Group and Li as a key member of Prince founder Chen Zhi's "criminal gang".

In June 2026, FinCEN proposed amending its October 2025 final rule against Huione Group to also cover the Cambodia-based H-Pay Service PLC and any other successor entity. FinCEN said the change was meant to stop Huione Group from getting around its exclusion from the U.S. financial system.
