= Hun To =

Cambodian businessman

Neak Oknha Hun To
- ហ៊ុន តូ
- Occupation: Businessman
- Known for: Director of Huione Pay
- Parent: Hun San (father)
- Relatives: Hun Sen (uncle); Hun Manet (cousin)

Hun To (Khmer: ហ៊ុន តូ) is a Cambodian businessman. He is a cousin of Prime Minister Hun Manet and a nephew of former prime minister Hun Sen. He has been identified as one of the directors of Huione Pay, a payment services provider within Huione Group.

In Australia, he has pursued defamation actions concerning media coverage of alleged criminal activity and online scam networks, which he has denied. Australian media have also linked him to a criminal-intelligence investigation into heroin trafficking and alleged money laundering targeting Australia, which he denied.

== Business activities ==
=== Huione Group and related services ===
Hun To has been identified as one of three directors of Huione Pay, a Phnom Penh-based firm offering currency exchange, payments and remittance services; the company said his directorship did not include day-to-day oversight of operations.

Cryptocurrency worth more than US$150,000 was sent between June 2023 and February 2024 to a Huione Pay wallet from a wallet that two blockchain analysts said was used to deposit funds stolen in hacks attributed by the Federal Bureau of Investigation to North Korea's Lazarus Group. The Reuters investigation said it found no evidence that Hun To or the ruling family had any knowledge of the transactions, and cited statements from the National Bank of Cambodia that payment firms were not allowed to deal or trade cryptocurrencies and digital assets.

In 2024, Elliptic described Huione Guarantee as a large Chinese-language online marketplace operating across thousands of channels on Telegram and using an escrow-style model; it reported that the service was widely used by online scammers and that payments were commonly denominated in the USDT stablecoin. ABC News said Elliptic found listings on Huione Guarantee for money laundering services and “detention equipment”, alongside other services associated with scam operations.

In May 2025, the U.S. Treasury's Financial Crimes Enforcement Network issued a finding identifying Huione Group as a “primary money laundering concern” and proposed measures intended to restrict its access to the U.S. financial system, citing risks linked to cyber heists and “pig butchering” scams. In 2025, Telegram said it had blocked Huione Guarantee and another large Chinese-language marketplace; Elliptic estimated the two services had handled more than US$35 billion in transactions since 2021.

Thailand's cybercrime police have publicly said they traced financial flows from online gambling and call-centre scams to Huione Group and were examining a potential connection to a nephew of Hun Sen; the police commissioner declined to comment when asked whether the company was owned by Hun To.

=== Scam compounds, corporate registrations and politically connected networks ===
An Al Jazeera investigation into scam-compound abuses in Cambodia stated that corporate registrations listed Hun To as a director of multiple Heng He companies connected to the compound it examined.

A 2025 report by Humanity Research Consultancy on Cambodia's trafficking-linked cybercrime economy identified Hun To as a director of Huione Group and said companies under the Heng He Group listed him as a director; the report also discussed politically connected investment networks including Prince Group Holdings.

== Australia ==
=== Operation Illipango investigation ===
Operation Illipango, an Australian Crime Commission inquiry, investigated the shipment of heroin to Australia from Cambodia concealed in loads of timber and related allegations of money laundering, according to Australian media reporting published in 2012. The same coverage said investigators planned to arrest and question Hun To in Melbourne, but that his visa application was denied by the Australian embassy in Phnom Penh; Hun To denied the allegations and denied that his visa had been refused.

=== Parliamentary statements ===
In March 2023, Australian MP Julian Hill argued in the House of Representatives that Hun To and other politically connected Cambodian figures “should never again be granted visas to visit Australia”.

In the same parliamentary speech, Hill said that Australian police had sought to arrest Hun To in 2003 on suspicions of heroin trafficking into Australia concealed in loads of timber, and alleged that Hun To and his wife, Jackie Tai, later acquired millions of dollars' worth of property in Australia without a legitimate explanation for the source of their wealth. Hill also alleged that Hun To was involved in a range of illicit activities, including drug trafficking, illegal deforestation, animal trafficking, illegal gambling and human trafficking. Hill further said that, in 2008, Hun To was accused by two opposition party candidates of ordering his bodyguards to assault them in Cambodia, and that he had heard similar allegations about assaults on critics in Australia.

Hun To has denied allegations of involvement in trafficking and money laundering.

=== Defamation proceedings ===
In 2024, The Australian removed a 2022 article and published a clarification stating that it did not intend to make criminal allegations against Hun To and accepted his denials; UCA News reported the proceedings were resolved on a confidential basis.

Radio Free Asia reported in 2024 that Australia declined to renew Hun To's visa during the dispute and that he and his family held business and property interests around Melbourne.

In 2025, The Australian reported on a hearing in the Federal Court of Australia in which Al Jazeera appealed a ruling connected to a defamation action brought by Hun To over a documentary about human trafficking and slavery in Cambodia; the report said the network sought access to documents held by the Australian Federal Police relating to an investigation into international drug trafficking and associated money laundering, and that the AFP resisted disclosure on public interest grounds.

== Dispute with Heng Sithy ==
In January 2025, Radio Free Asia reported that Hun To threatened legal action against businessman Heng Sithy after Heng filed a complaint to Cambodia's justice ministry alleging that US$9 million had been taken from a Chinese investor in connection with promised support for a mining project; Hun To said the allegations were untrue and defamatory and said he was prepared to file a counterclaim.
