= Cambodia Airways =

Regional airline of Cambodia

Cambodia Airways Co., Ltd. ខេមបូឌា អ៊ែរវ៉េ

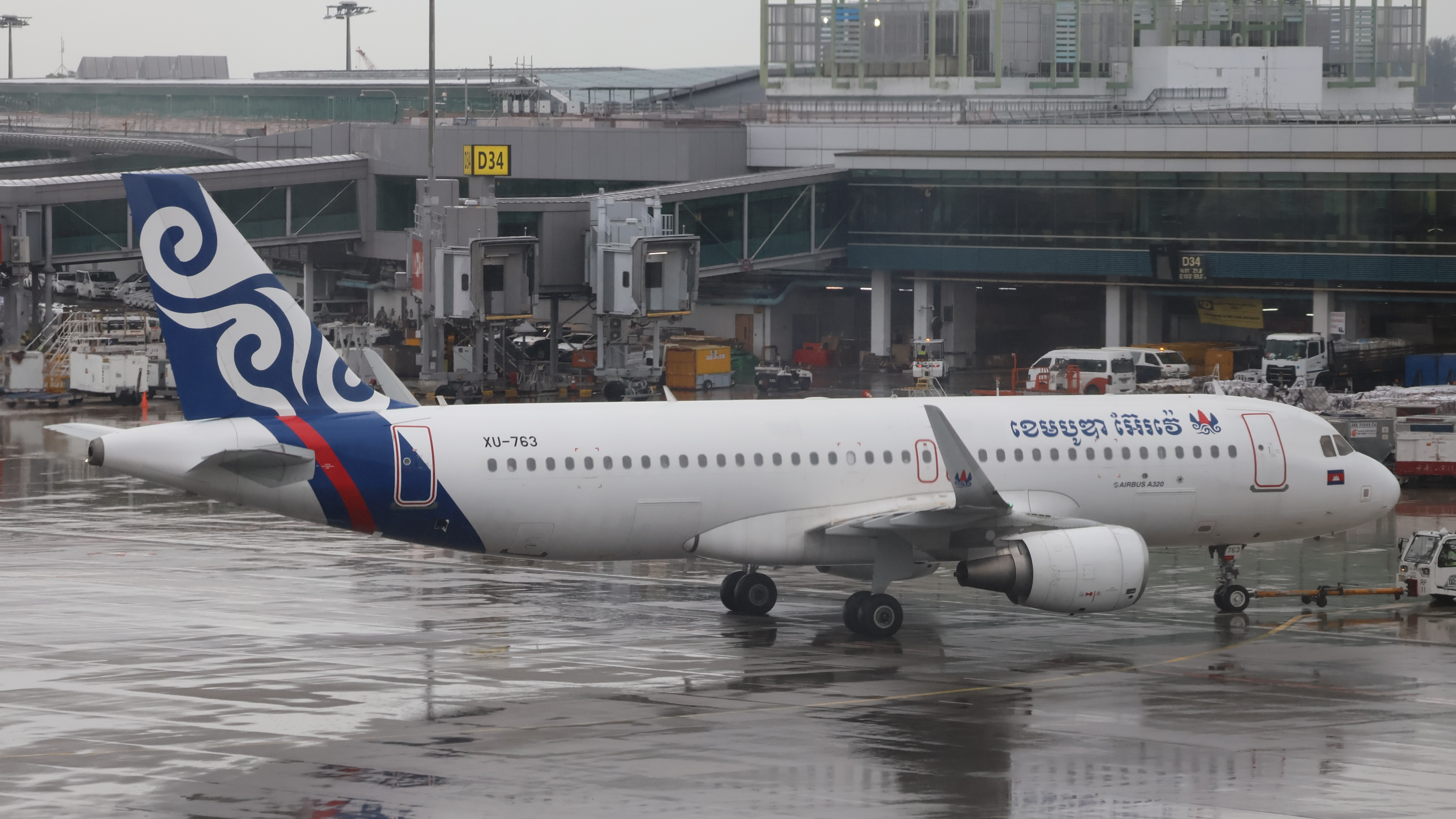
- An A320-200 of Cambodia Airways at Singapore Changi Airport
IATA	ICAO	Call sign
KR	KME	GIANT IBIS
- Founded: 11 September 2017; 9 years ago
- Commenced operations: 10 July 2018; 8 years ago
- Hubs: Techo International Airport
- Fleet size: 6
- Destinations: 19
- Parent company: Cambodia Airways Co., Ltd.
- Headquarters: Phnom Penh, Cambodia
- Key people: Edison Duan (chairman and CEO)
- Website: www.cambodia-airways.com

Cambodia Airways is an airline based in Cambodia. The company slogan is The Wings of Cambodia. Cambodia Airways has been linked in reporting to the Cambodian conglomerate Prince Holding Group.

As of January 2024, Cambodia Airways is the third largest airline in Cambodia by passenger traffic.

== History ==
Cambodia Airways was founded on 10 July 2018 by Chen Zhi, a naturalized Cambodian of Chinese descent, who has been charged by the U.S. Department of Justice with being "the mastermind behind a sprawling cyber-fraud empire", and was a part of Chen's Prince Group. Chen held the position of founding chairman in the airline until December 2023.

By the end of August 2019, Cambodia Airways serves eight routes from its hub in Phnom Penh to Siem Reap and Sihanoukville for domestic flights, and for the international ones are to Macau, Taipei and Taichung (both in Taiwan for charter flights), Bangkok (Suvarnabhumi Airport), and Fuzhou (Mainland China).

In 2024, Cambodia Airways filed for an initial public offering (IPO) on Nasdaq. The prospectus filed with the Securities and Exchange Commission stated that the company was incorporated in the Cayman Islands and listed Singaporean national Ng Hwa Kong as the company's chairman. Radio Free Asia described Cambodia Airways as a subsidiary of Prince International Airlines and as connected to Prince Holding Group.

== Destinations ==
As of September 2025, Cambodia Airways flies (or has flown) to the following destinations:

Country	City	Airport	Notes	Refs
Cambodia	Dara Sakor	Dara Sakor International Airport		
Cambodia	Phnom Penh	Phnom Penh International Airport	Airport Closed	
Cambodia	Phnom Penh	Techo International Airport	Hub	
Cambodia	Siem Reap	Siem Reap International Airport	Airport Closed	
Cambodia	Siem Reap	Siem Reap–Angkor International Airport	Hub	
Cambodia	Sihanoukville	Sihanouk International Airport		
China	Beijing	Beijing Daxing International Airport	Terminated	
China	Changsha	Changsha Huanghua International Airport		
China	Chengdu	Chengdu Tianfu International Airport		
China	Chongqing	Chongqing Jiangbei International Airport		
China	Fuzhou	Fuzhou Changle International Airport	Terminated	
China	Guangzhou	Guangzhou Baiyun International Airport		
China	Haikou	Haikou Meilan International Airport	Terminated	
China	Jieyang	Jieyang Chaoshan International Airport	Terminated	
China	Jinan	Jinan Yaoqiang International Airport	Terminated	
China	Nanjing	Nanjing Lukou International Airport	Terminated	
China	Nantong	Nantong Xingdong International Airport	Terminated	
China	Ningbo	Ningbo Lishe International Airport	Terminated	
China	Sanya	Sanya Phoenix International Airport		
China	Shenzhen	Shenzhen Bao'an International Airport		
China	Wenzhou	Wenzhou Longwan International Airport	Terminated	
Hong Kong	Hong Kong	Hong Kong International Airport		
Macau	Macau	Macau International Airport		
Maldives	Malé	Velana International Airport	Terminated	
Malaysia	Kuala Lumpur	Kuala Lumpur International Airport		
Malaysia	Penang	Penang International Airport	Terminated	
Palau	Koror	Roman Tmetuchl International Airport	Charter	
Russia	Vladivostok	Vladivostok International Airport	Charter	
Singapore	Singapore	Changi Airport		
South Korea	Muan	Muan International Airport	Terminated	
Taiwan	Taichung	Taichung International Airport	Terminated	
Taiwan	Taipei	Taoyuan International Airport	Terminated	
Thailand	Bangkok	Suvarnabhumi Airport		
Thailand	Ko Samui	Samui Airport	Terminated	
Vietnam	Da Nang	Da Nang International Airport		
Vietnam	Ho Chi Minh City	Tan Son Nhat International Airport		

=== Interline agreements ===
Since April 2020 Cambodia Airways has a partnership with Hahn Air.

== Fleet ==
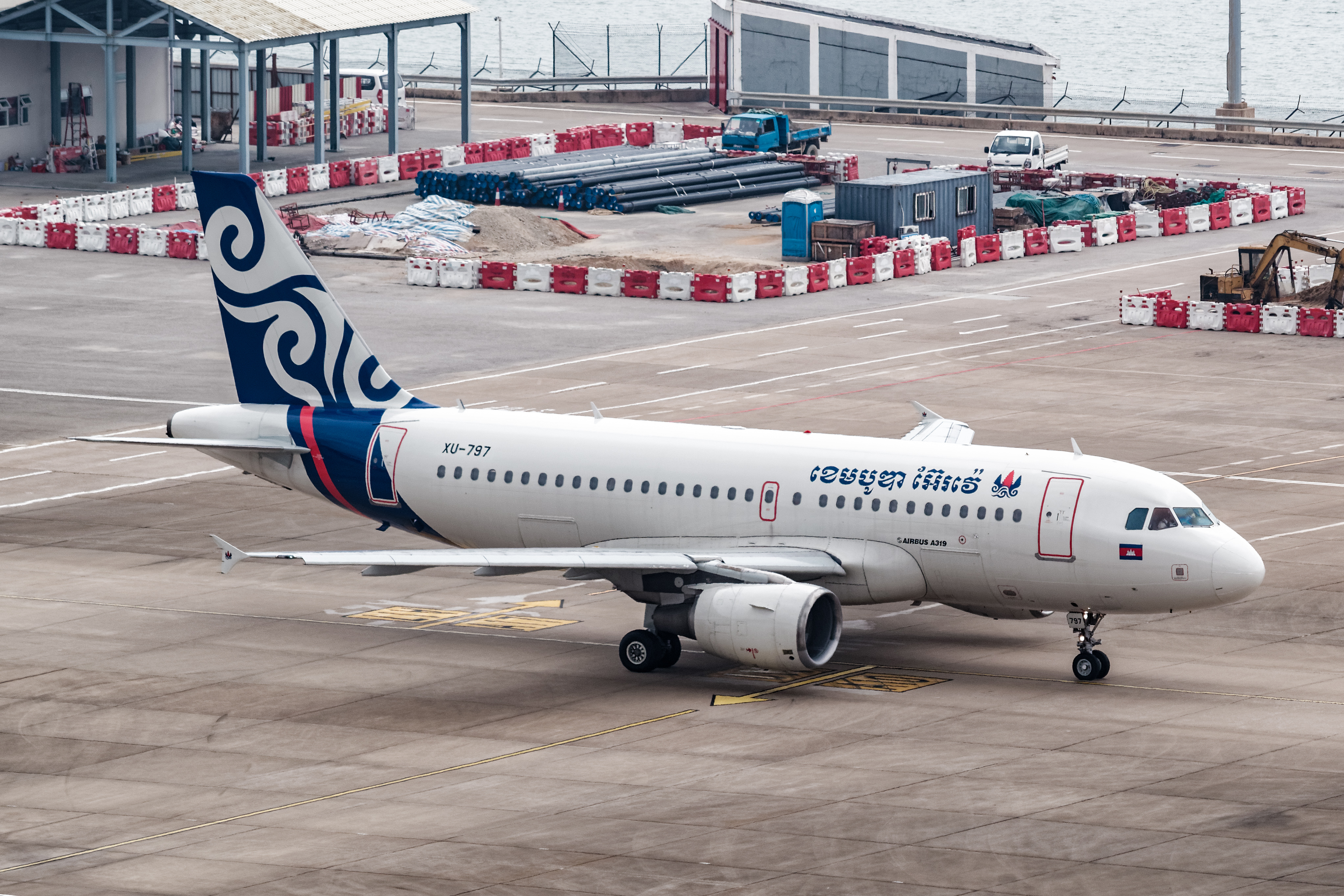
Cambodia Airways A319-100 at Macau International Airport (2018)

As of July 2026, Cambodia Airways operates the following aircraft:

Aircraft	In service	Orders	Passengers	Notes
Airbus A319-100	2	—	150	
Airbus A320-200	3	—	180	
ATR 72-600	1	1	70	
Total	6	1		
