= Gambling in Cambodia =

NagaWorld in Phnom Penh

Gambling in Cambodia is officially illegal under the 1996 Law on Suppression of Gambling, which outlawed all unauthorized forms of gambling and provided for penalties ranging from monetary fines to short prison sentences, although the Cambodian government's General Department of Prisons does not list gambling as one of the 28 offenses punishable by imprisonment.

The prohibition on gambling, which also extends to all forms of online gambling, only applies to Cambodian citizens. As of October 2015, there were 75 casinos catering to foreign tourists operating within Cambodia, providing an estimated US$29 million in revenue to the national government in the first nine months of the year and $2 billion in income for the casinos. Cambodian citizens are allowed to gamble through government sponsored gaming including five separate privately run national lotteries. Cambodians were also previously permitted to play the slot machines located in the nation's casinos, however due to complaints of violence related to gambling debts and widespread problem gambling, slot machines were banned in 2009.

Gambling as a popular pastime is ingrained in Southeast Asian culture in general and Cambodian culture in particular. Men who don't gamble are often viewed as not masculine. Consequently, despite the laws against citizens gambling, illegal gambling is widespread in Cambodia. The police forces in Cambodia, ruled by one of the most corrupt governments in the world, often look the other way as casinos freely allow locals to enter and provide private rooms for government and law enforcement officials, who oftentimes have a vested financial interest in the casinos, to conduct illegal gambling.

Extralegal activities are also widespread outside of the permitted casinos ranging from cockfights and card rooms to sports book (primarily regional football and Kun Khmer matches) and unauthorized lotteries. Most of these activities are controlled by organized crime and protected by bribes to law enforcement.

A number of societal issues plague Cambodia as a result of gambling, most notably gambling addiction.

== Casino industry ==
The Grand Diamond City casino at the Poipet Thai border checkpoint (destroyed in a fire in 2022)

In Cambodia, it is illegal for citizens to gamble. Only foreigners are allowed to bet in Cambodia's casinos. Border areas such as Poipet (Thai border with Cambodia) and Bavet (Vietnamese border with Cambodia) have numerous casinos allowing Thai and Vietnamese locals to gamble without the restrictions of their home countries.

Beginning in the late 1990s, Cambodia has been building a casino industry to capitalize on this, constructing casinos in border towns and popular resort areas and enticing foreign gamblers while officially prohibiting its own citizens from entering. In border towns such as Poipet, O Smach and Bavet there are "casino strips" located next to the border where nearby foreigners can visit for gambling. A visa is still required for most foreign citizens but ASEAN member citizens can generally enter visa free for a period of time.

In popular tourist resort areas, such as Koh Kong and Sihanoukville, casinos are open to anybody with a foreign passport and the largest casino in the country, Phnom Penh's NagaWorld Casino, which has exclusive gaming rights within a 200 kilometer radius of the capital, has plans to operate a charter service to fly in wealthy customers from China.

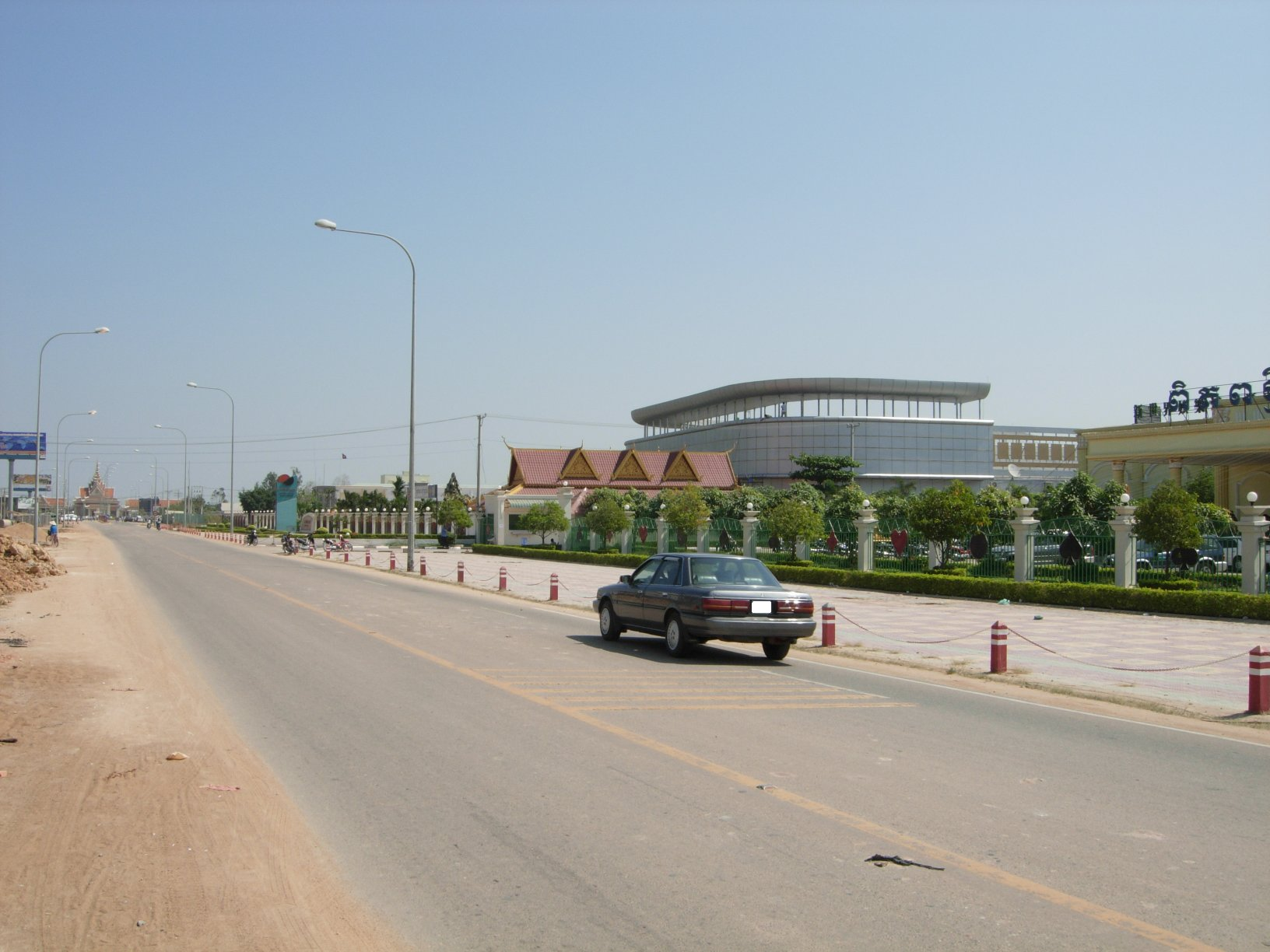
A Cambodian casino in Bavet at the Vietnamese border crossing

Cambodia's casino industry continues to grow. In 2011 US$20 million in tax revenue was generated. In 2014, 57 casinos provided an estimated $25 million in revenue to the national government, while in the first nine months of 2015, 75 casinos, with ten new establishments licensed in the third quarter alone, were responsible for $29 million in government revenue and $2 billion in income for casino owners, most of which are foreign investment companies.

The Law on the Management of Commercial Gambling (LMCG), promulgated in 2020, serves as the primary regulatory framework governing gambling activities in Cambodia. The law establishes a structured licensing system that permits both domestic and international operators to apply for casino licenses. The Commercial Gambling Management Commission of Cambodia (CGMC) is responsible for overseeing the licensing and regulatory enforcement of the gambling industry.

LMCG allows the issuance of licenses for land-based and integrated resort casinos. Online casinos licenses are an integral part of land-based casino licenses giving the venues the option to host online gambling in addition to their brick-and-mortar operations. Stand-alone online-only casino licenses are not issued.

Sihanoukville developed a significant online casino industry. Along with online casinos, Sihanoukville became a site for many online scam operations directed towards Chinese citizens. In 2018, Cambodia and China established a joint law enforcement partnership. In 2019, they opened the National Police's Anti-Technology Crime Division joint operations center in Phnom Penh. A day after the center's inauguration, more than 100 Chinese were arrested and deported from Cambodia to China to be prosecuted. Cambodia banned online gambling effective in 2020. Many of the Chinese gambling operators who left Cambodia after the ban did not return to China. Instead, many migrated to Karen State, Myanmar, in the Myanmar-Thai border region where they established gambling operations.

== Social issues ==
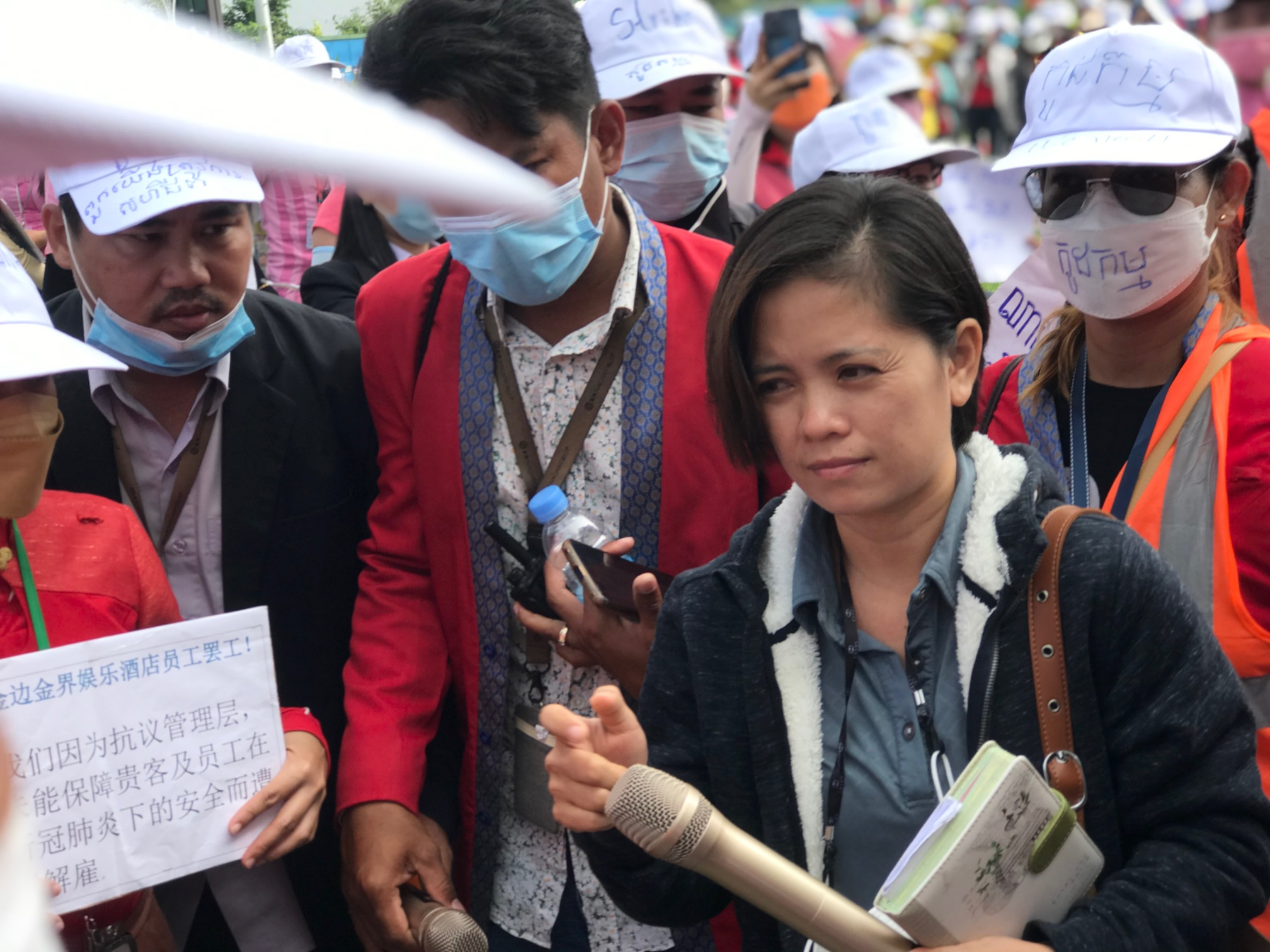
NagaWorld employees on strike in 2021

Cambodians often cite an old Khmer proverb lbaeng taeng vineah (Khmer: ល្បែងតែងវិនាស), "Gambling always destroys (life)", which reflects the variety of social problems revolving around gambling from which Cambodia suffers, including crime related to illegal gambling and repayment of debts, domestic disputes and, destructive gambling addiction which is a huge problem in Cambodia. Despite the official prohibition on citizens partaking in any form of unauthorized gaming, gambling is a significant part of Cambodian culture.

Gambling, usually in the form of card or dice games, is traditionally only socially acceptable during the weeks surrounding New Year celebrations. However, gambling continues year-round at every opportunity, in underground card houses, lotteries (both legal and illegal), sports book, online gaming, through unlawful entry into the casinos or even impromptu games on work breaks; there is even a game called chak teuk phliang in which Cambodians will bet, sometimes up to US$1000, on when and how much it will rain.

A foreign passport is required to enter a casino in Cambodia, providing a loophole that allows the many urban Cambodians with dual citizenship to legally gamble. The rural population and those that can't produce a foreign ID must bribe the local police to gain entry to legitimate casinos. Gamblers leaving casinos or other, less formal, illicit gaming venues have reported being forced to give up to two-thirds of their daily winnings to police in order to avoid arrest when caught.

There are little to no psychological services available to those addicted. Among Cambodian men, gambling, along with drinking and other such vices, is seen as a symbol conveying masculinity. Cambodian society has traditionally viewed problem gambling as a social problem rather than a medical problem, consequently, very few seek treatment from medical professionals. As of 2012, the nationwide treatment program, Transcultural Psychological Organisation, reported treating patients for disorders such as depression and drug addiction but had not treated a single patient for gambling addiction.
