= Khmer Times =

English-language newspaper in Cambodia

- Insight into Cambodia
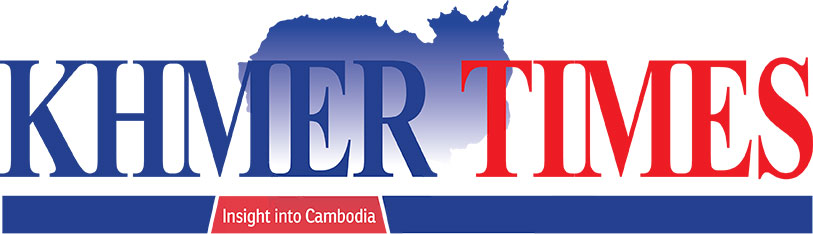

- A digital copy of the Khmer Times, dated 19 April 2021. Bearing an announcement above the main headline that the circulation of print edition has been temporary halted due to COVID-19 pandemic.
- Format: Print, online
- Owner: Mohan Tirugmanasam Bandam
- Founded: May 2014; 12 years ago
- Political alignment: pro-Cambodian People's Party
- Language: English
- Headquarters: Phnom Penh
- Country: Cambodia
- Website: www.khmertimeskh.com

The Khmer Times is a Cambodian English-language newspaper, launched in May 2014, and based in Phnom Penh, Cambodia, and owned by Malaysian national Mohan Tirugmanasam Bandam. The Khmer Times is one of a number of English language news outlets reporting on Cambodia, along with international news, for the Cambodian domestic English-speaking market, and also functions as an international portal for Cambodian sourced news and current affairs. In common with many other South-East Asian (ASEAN) countries, the news outlet operates under press rules that discourage western style editorialisation of the news, a format viewed in the West as 'restricted'.

The newspaper has been flagged by western media outlets as being strongly pro-CPP in its reporting and editorials. The outlet is regarded in Cambodia as a journal of record for expatriate residents and English-speaking Cambodians, locally enjoying a high degree of perception as having journalistic integrity.

In recent times, the paper was caught plagiarizing a 'letters to the editor' section. On investigation, it was shown that the paper had copied and pasted from 'The Mirror' and changed 'Malaysia' to 'Cambodia'
