= Chen Zhi (businessman) =

Chinese-Cambodian businessman (born 1987)

~~Neak Oknha~~ Chen Zhi
- 陈志
- Born: 16 December 1987 (age 38); Lianjiang County, Fuzhou, Fujian Province, China
- Citizenship: China (Note: Under Chinese nationality law, China does not recognize multiple nationality, but Cambodian nationality law allow Cambodians have multiple citizenship. Under Cambodian law, a person who obtain oknha title should have Cambodian citizenship. Therefore, Chen's oknha title was lost when his Cambodian nationality had been revoked. A press release published by the U.S. Treasury Department stated that Chen was renounced his Chinese citizenship, and a report stated that this incident occurred in 2014, but the Chinese Public Security Ministry still referred to him as a Chinese citizen in its announcement about Chen arresting.); Cambodia (revoked in 2025); Vanuatu; Cyprus
- Occupation: Chairman of Prince Holding Group
- Years active: 2015–2025
- Known for: Businessman
- Spouse: Li Caiyun

Chinese name
- Simplified Chinese: 陈志
- Traditional Chinese: 陳志
Transcriptions
Standard Mandarin
- Hanyu Pinyin: Chén Zhì
Eastern Min
- Fuzhou BUC: Dìng Cé
- Website: Prince Holding Group

Chen Zhi (Khmer: ចេន ហ្ស៊ី, Chinese: 陈志, born 16 December 1987), also known as Vincent Chen Zhi, is a Chinese-Cambodian convicted criminal, businessman and the chairman of the Prince Group. In October 2025, he was sanctioned by the US and UK governments for his involvement in the Prince Group transnational criminal organization case, alleging the group's leadership in multiple cryptocurrency scheme operations that defrauded several billions in US dollars.

== Early life ==
Chen Zhi was born into an ordinary family in Xiao'ao Town, Lianjiang County, Fuzhou, Fujian Province, China. He has an older brother who later went to Cambodia with him. His academic performance was mediocre, and he dropped out of school before finishing middle school. He started his own business by opening a "small internet cafe" in Fuzhou. Chen Zhi's fellow villagers said that he had worked as a network administrator in internet cafes in Guangdong and Jiangsu for two or three years. After that, he also did data trading and transmission, and opened a matchmaking website and a game dating website. A few years later, he left his hometown and went to Shanghai to make a living. Around the 2000s, Chen assembled a team to set up a private server for the MMORPG The Legend of Mir 2 and amassed his first fortune.

== Career ==
Chen Zhi went to Cambodia and invested in the real estate market in 2011. On 16 February 2014, he obtained Cambodian citizenship through an immigrant investor program. In 2015, he founded the Prince Holding Group, which later expanded into various fields such as banking, finance and tourism, becoming one of the largest business groups in Cambodia. The company established the "Prince Foundation" in 2015, and the total amount of donations has exceeded US$16 million. The group was headquartered in Sihanoukville as one of the earliest Chinese corporate entities, contributing to the city's economic shift as a seaside resort to a regional gambling centre, later branching out to Phnom Penh and Chrey Thum. Chen was publicly known for his philanthropy, contributing the equivalent of US$3,000,000 to Cambodia's COVID-19 vaccine purchases and funding scholarship programs with the Ministry of Education, Youth and Sport. The official website of the Prince Group stated that Chen Zhi also actively participated in charity work to help the local Cambodian community develop better. He has served as an advisor to the Ministry of Interior since 2017. In 2017, Chen also became the founding chairman of Cambodia Airways, a position he held until December 2023.

On 20 July 2020, he was awarded the honorary title of Neak Oknha. In 2021, Chen Zhi won the Best Entrepreneur of the Stevie Awards. He has deep connections with several senior Cambodian officials and has served as an advisor to Sar Kheng, Heng Samrin and Hun Sen.

It is still unclear how Chen Zhi accumulated such a huge fortune. Prince Group had been investigated by Chinese police between 2020 and 2022. In May 2020, the Beijing Municipal Public Security Bureau has set up a special task force to investigate Prince Group. Since then, seven different Chinese provincial courts have ruled that the various employees of Prince Group have committed gambling, illegal under both Cambodian and Chinese law, and money laundering crimes, but Prince Holding Group and Chen Zhi were not prosecuted at the time. The company claimed that it was the result of criminals impersonating "impersonation by criminal elements."

In 2021, a consortium led by Chen purchased a 50% stake in Cuba's largest cigar producer Habanos S.A.

According to U.S. authorities, Chen held citizenships of Cambodia, Cyprus, St Lucia and Vanuatu, and maintained residency in Cambodia, Singapore, Taiwan and the United Kingdom. After his extradition to China, both Chinese and Cambodian authorities ascribed his original Chinese citizenship to Chen.

== Sanctions and criminal charges ==
On 14 October 2025, the United States and United Kingdom took the largest action ever targeting cybercriminal networks in Southeast Asia. The U.S. Department of Justice indicted Chen Zhi on charges of fraud and money laundering. The U.S. Department of Justice accused Chen Zhi of being "the mastermind behind a sprawling cyber-fraud empire... a criminal enterprise built on human suffering". In a joint operation between the United States and the United Kingdom, approximately 127,271 bitcoins held by Chen Zhi were seized, then worth ~US$14 billion. At the same time, the U.S. Treasury Department added 146 individuals and entities associated with the Prince Group to the sanctions list. All of Chen Zhi's assets in the UK and 19 properties in London were frozen. Thailand and Singapore also began investigations into the Prince Group. In coordination with the U.S. sanctions, Singapore seized S$150 million in assets; Taiwan seized T$4.5 billion in assets and detained 25; Hong Kong seized HK$2.75 billion.

In January 2026, Cambodia stated that Chen had been arrested, stripped of his Cambodian citizenship, and extradited to China to face charges. On 1 April 2026, China Central Television reported that with the strong support of relevant Cambodian departments, China's Ministry of Public Security dispatched a working group and successfully extradited Li Xiong, a core member of Chen Zhi's criminal gang, from Phnom Penh, Cambodia back to China. The report stated: "This is another major achievement in law enforcement cooperation between China and Cambodia." On 16 May 2026, Cambodian authorities raided two Phnom Penh buildings linked to Chinese billionaire Chen Zhi, detaining 104 people, mostly Chinese nationals, for alleged online scams.

== See also ==
- Scam centers in Cambodia
