= Prince Group =

Cambodian holding company

Prince Holding Group
- Native name: Khmer: ព្រីនស៍ ហូលឌីង គ្រុប; Chinese: 太子集团控股
- Industry: Real estate development, financial services, consumer services
- Founded: 2015
- Headquarters: Plov Koh Pich, Phum 14, Tonlé Bassac Commune, Chamkar Mon District, Phnom Penh, Cambodia
- Key people: Chairman: Chen Zhi
- Subsidiaries: Prince Real Estate Group, Prince Huan Yu Real Estate Group, Prince Bank
- Website: princeholdinggroup.com (archived)

Prince Holding Group is a company based in Cambodia. Described as "one of Cambodia's largest conglomerates", the company has interests in various sectors such as real estate (Prince Real Estate Group), financial services (Prince Bank) and airlines (Cambodia Airways). In 2025, it and its chairman Chen Zhi were sanctioned by the United States and United Kingdom for their alleged role in operating scam centers and online fraud.

== History ==
The group was founded by Chen Zhi in 2015. The Prince Group invested heavily in Sihanoukville, which became a "Chinese casino boomtown", offering physical and online casinos targeted at the mainland Chinese market, where gambling is illegal.

In 2017, Chen and Prince Group co-founded the Jinbei Casino with Sar Sokha, a Cambodian politician who later became Deputy Prime Minister.

The businesses flourished until 2019, when online gambling was criminalized in Cambodia, followed shortly by the travel restrictions of the COVID-19 pandemic and the resulting collapse in inbound travel to Cambodia.

In 2021, Prince Group was given the Corporate Social Responsibility Model Award by China Finance Summit (CFS). In 2026, the United States and European Union sanctioned the Prince Group.

== Criminal charges ==
In May 2020, Beijing Municipal Public Security Bureau began investigating the Prince Group's connections to online gambling and money laundering. In July 2022, a court in Wangcang County, Sichuan alleged that the Prince Group had profited at least 2 billion Chinese yuan (US$700 million) from illegal gambling since 2016. A Prince Group spokesman denied the allegations, saying the Jinbei Group was unrelated and other entities were fraudulently impersonating the Prince Group.

Assets belonging to the group were frozen in October 2025 as part of an investigation by the Department of Justice into wire fraud and money laundering by Chen. These assets included 127,271 bitcoin (worth over $14 billion) and 19 properties in London. In the Eastern District of New York, the group's chairman was indicted and prosecutors filed a civil forfeiture complaint against the bitcoin. The Justice Department called the complaint the largest forfeiture action in its history. Hong Kong subsequently froze HK$2.75 billion (US$354 million) of assets tied to Prince Group, with Singapore seizing S$150 million (US$115 million) of Prince Group assets including six properties, 11 cars and a yacht.

In January 2026, Cambodia stated that Chen had been arrested, stripped of his Cambodian citizenship, and extradited to China with two others to face charges. The central bank of Cambodia also ordered the liquidation of Prince Bank.

In March 2026, the Taipei District Prosecutors Office indicted 62 people and 13 companies over their alleged roles in scam operations run by the Prince Group.

In April 2026, Huione Group's former chairman Li Xiong was extradited from Cambodia to China to face money laundering charges. Chinese authorities described Huione as a subsidiary of Prince Group and Li as a key member of Chen Zhi's "criminal gang".

In June 2026, the Singapore Police Force said it was investigating Hu Xiaowei and Qiu Wei Ren, both Chinese nationals, for alleged money-laundering offences connected to ongoing investigations into Prince Holding Group, its founder Chen Zhi, and related associates and companies. Police said Hu's associated company, Future Oasis Pte Ltd, was also under investigation, and that assets held across Hu's bank and securities accounts in Singapore had previously been seized in January 2026. The police added that Hu and Qiu had left Singapore before police operations began in October 2025 and were not in Singapore at the time of the announcement. Hu Xiaowei has been described by U.S. authorities as the "second-in-command" of Prince Group; the group's spokesperson has said Hu has never worked for the company and that ther was "no evidence of the US government’s unsupported allegations".

== Businesses and projects ==
Selected companies and branded projects associated with Prince Holding Group
Name	Business area
Prince Bank PLC (also known as Prince Finance PLC)	Banking and finance
Prince Real Estate Cambodia Group Co. Ltd. (also known as Prince Real Estate Group)	Real estate
Prince Huan Yu Real Estate Cambodia Group Co. Ltd.	Real estate
Prince Plaza Investment Co. Ltd. (Prince Plaza)	Retail and real estate
Prince Times Plaza Co. Ltd. (Prince Times Plaza)	Real estate
Prince Times Hotel Management Co. Ltd. (Prince Times Hotel)	Hospitality
Prince Yacht Club Cambodia Co. Ltd. (Prince Yacht Club)	Hospitality
Prince Seashore No.1 Co. Ltd. (Prince Seashore No 1)	Real estate
Prince Smart Garden Co. Ltd. (Prince Smart Garden)	Real estate
Prince Super Market Cambodia Co. Ltd. (Prince Super Market)	Retail
Jin Bei Group Co. Ltd. (also known as Jinbei Casino)	Gaming and hospitality
Golden Fortune Resorts World Co. Ltd. (also known as Golden Fortune Science and Technology Park)	Real estate and technology park
Warp Data Technology Lao Sole Co. Ltd.	Cryptocurrency mining
Grand Legend International Asset Management Group Co. Ltd.	Overseas investment
Prince Horology Vocational Training Center	Training and education
Prince Foundation	Philanthropy
Cambodia Airways	Aviation
