= Boeng Prolit =

Boeng Prolit បឹងព្រលិត
- Commune
- Interactive map of Boeng Prolit
- Country: Cambodia
- Province: Phnom Penh
- District: Prampir Makara
- Time zone: UTC+07:00 (ICT)

Boeng Prolit (Khmer: បឹងព្រលិត) is a commune (sangkat) in Prampir Makara District, Phnom Penh, Cambodia.

Melanie Brew of the Phnom Penh Post stated that it has an "L" shape, that it is "lush and leafy", and that it is in proximity to Boeng Keng Kang I (BKK1).

== Population ==
The population includes Cambodian, Chinese, Vietnamese, and other foreigners.

== Education ==
Brew stated that international schools in proximity include British International School of Phnom Penh, Home of English, ICan British International School, International School of Phnom Penh (ISPP), and Zaman International School.
