= Tuol Svay Prey II =

Tuol Svay Prey II ទួលស្វាយព្រៃទី២
- Quarter
- Interactive map of Tuol Svay Prey II
- Country: Cambodia
- Province: Phnom Penh
- Section: Boeng Keng Kang
- Time zone: UTC+07:00 (ICT)

Tuol Svay Prey II (TSPII, Khmer: ទួលស្វាយព្រៃទី២) is a quarter (sangkat) of Boeng Keng Kang Section (formerly of Chamkar Mon Section), Phnom Penh, Cambodia.

In 2008 the staff of the Phnom Penh Post wrote that the area, "on the edge of the city", had an "urban" atmosphere, that it was "close to everything" and that it had "a strong sense of community." The newspaper added that "there is not a whole lot to do in the area. Unless you want to drive, the action is fairly limited."

== Transport ==
Monireth Boulevard is to the northwest and Sihanouk Boulevard is to the northeast. The Phnom Penh Post wrote that those two roads, particularly during rush hour, can become congested.

== Education ==
There are no international schools in the community. According to the Phnom Penh Post, Singapore International School is the international school with the most proximity and that "Northbridge International School Cambodia is also very close." The publication described the British International School of Phnom Penh, Home of English, iCAN British International School, the International School of Phnom Penh (ISPP) and Zaman International School as being "slightly more distant".
