= Khan Chbar Ampov =

Chbar Ampov ច្បារអំពៅ
- District
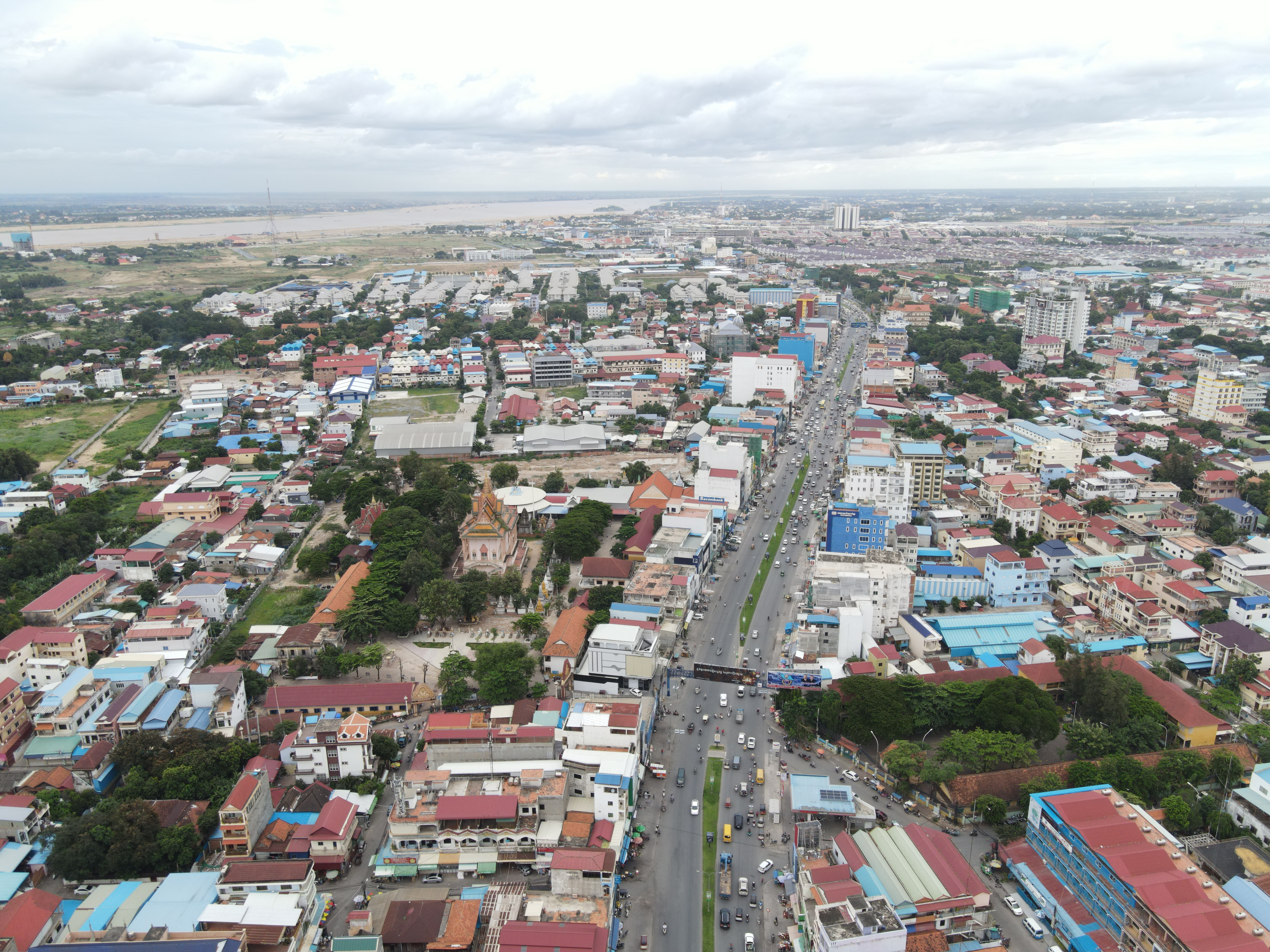
- Chbar Ampov Skyline

- Location of Chbar Ampov within Phnom Penh
- Coordinates: 11°31′22.08″N 104°58′1.199″E
- Country: Cambodia
- Province: Phnom Penh

Area
  - Total: 86.7 km^{2} (33.5 sq mi)

Population (2019)
  - Total: 164,379
- Time zone: UTC+7 (ICT)

Chbar Ampov (Khmer: ច្បារអំពៅ, Chbar Âmpŏu [cɓaː ɑmpɨw]; meaning "Sugarcane Garden") is a district (khan) in central Phnom Penh, Cambodia.

Formed in December 2013 by splitting eight communes from neighbouring Khan Mean Chey, Chbar Ampov is located on the east of Phnom Penh, and is separated from the city by the Bassac river.

== Administration ==
Chbar Ampov is subdivided into 8 Sangkats and 50 Villages.

| No. | Postal Code | Sangkat (commune) | Phum (villages) |
|---|---|---|---|
| 1 | 121201 | Chbar Ampov I | Preaek, Daeum Meakkloea, Daeum Ampil |
| 2 | 121202 | Chbar Ampov II | Daeum Chan, Kandal, Daeum Slaeng, Deum Chan I, Kandal I |
| 3 | 121203 | Nirouth | Ta Ngov, Boeung Chhuk, Russei Sraoh, Koh Norea, Ta Ngov Kandal, Ta Ngov Kraom, Deum Slaeng I |
| 4 | 121204 | Prek Pra | Chroy Basak, Preah Ponlea, Prek Ta Pov, Ou Andoung, Chrouy Basak Muoy, Ou Andoung Muoy |
| 8 | 121205 | Veal Sbov | Kdei Ta Koy, Veal Sbov, Svay Ta Ok, Prek Cheang Prum, Svay Ta Ok 1 |
| 5 | 121206 | Prek Aeng | Kbal Chroy, Ta Prum, Mittapheap, Tuol Ta Chan, Chong Prek, Roboah Angkanh, Mitakpheap 1, Chong Preaek 1, Roboah Angkanh 1 |
| 7 | 121207 | Kbal Koh | Chroy Ampil, Yok Bat, Prek Thum, Chrouy Ampil 1, Chrouy Ampil 2, Yok Bat 1, Preaek Thum 1, Preaek Thum 2 |
| 6 | 121208 | Prek Thmei | Campuh K'aek, Koh Krabei, Prek Thmei, Campuh K'aek 1, Koh Krabei 1, Prek Thmei 1 |

== Transport ==
Two bridges span the Bassac river to the capital in the district's north, and one bridge in the south connects to Takhmao Municipality.

The Monivong Bridge on National Road 1 connects Sangkat Cbhar Ampov I to Khan Chamcarmon, while the Koh Pich-Koh Norea Bridge which opened October 2023 links the nascent Koh Norea island development to Koh Pich in Sangkat Tonle Basak. The Cambodia-China Friendship Takhmao Bridge connects National Road 1 to National Road 2.

Construction of a fourth bridge, the Chak Angre Krom-Prek Pra Bridge (formerly named the Prek Talong bridge), was inaugurated in February 2024. The bridge will connect Sangkat Prek Pra to Chung Kong Boulevard in Sangkat Chak Angre Kraom, Mean Chey district. The boulevard will eventually extend from Chamkar Doung Road Khmer: ផ្លូវ ចំការដូង (២១៧) in Dangkao district to National Road 1 in Sangkat Veal Sbov, Chbar Ampov.

== Development ==
The growth of residential development in Khan Chbar Ampov has been significant since 2013. This area has transitioned from being predominantly rural and agricultural to a rapidly developing urban area. This transformation is part of the broader urban expansion seen across Phnom Penh, driven by economic growth and increasing urbanization.

This economic vitality has driven the demand for residential spaces, pushing developments further from the city center into districts like Khan Chbar Ampov. The area's appeal has been bolstered by relatively lower land prices compared to central Phnom Penh, attracting a diverse range of projects from affordable borey housing to condos and luxury estates by developers including Peng Huoth and BIC Development.

=== Koh Norea ===
Koh Norea, also known as Norea City, is an ongoing major urban development project located on an island at the confluence of the Mekong River and Bassac River in Phnom Penh, Cambodia. The $2.5 billion project is being developed by the Overseas Cambodia Investment Corporation (OCIC) with the aim of transforming the island into a thriving mixed-use riverfront district and landmark in Phnom Penh's real estate landscape.

==== Development Plans ====
OCIC's master plan envisions Koh Norea being developed into an ultra-modern mini-city featuring:

- Residential: High-end condominiums, villas, and apartment complexes
- Hospitality: Luxury hotels and a convention center
- Commercial: Shopping malls, office buildings
- Tourism: Marinas, parks, recreation facilities
- Infrastructure: Road bridges linking to mainland, electricity, water, and waste treatment facilities

The plans emphasize green building design and sustainable urban planning principles. If fully realized, Norea City would have the capacity for over 50,000 residents and workers.

==== History ====
Historically, the 125 hectare reclamation project Koh Norea was a towhead island. The island has appeared in the earliest French protectorate era maps of Phnom Penh from 1864 through to the early 20th century.

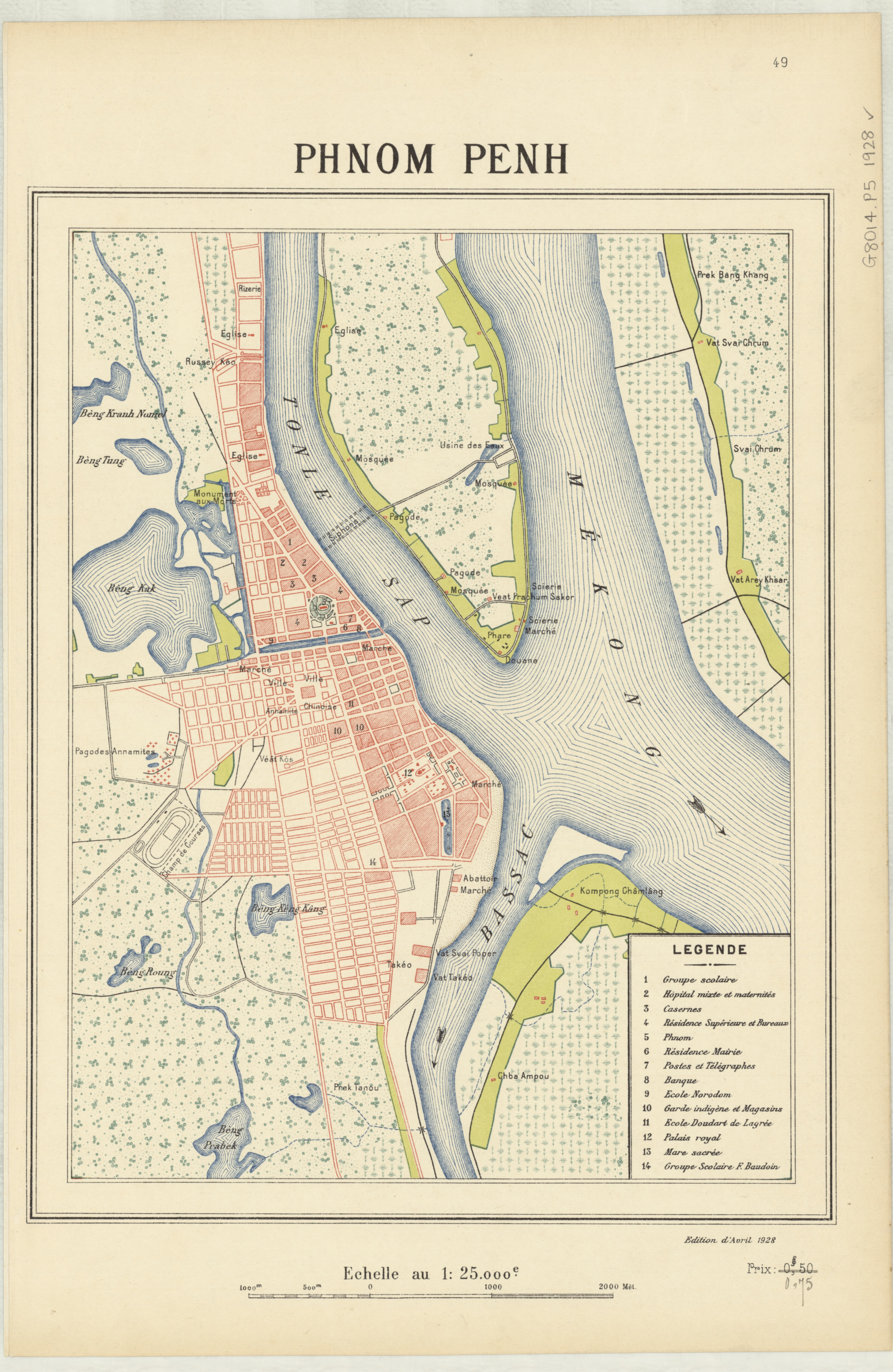
A map of Phnom Penh depicting Koh Norea, published in 1928 by Publié par le Service géographique de l'Indochine.

==== Controversy ====
While promising to create a modern eco-friendly riverfront district, the massive scale of the development has raised concerns from environmental groups and urban planners about potential negative impacts including:

- Environmental disruption to Mekong/Bassac river ecosystems
- Changes to river morphology, possibly leading to riverbank erosion downstream
- Insufficient urban infrastructure and public services
- Gentrification pressures on existing communities

== Education ==
Chbar Ampov has a growing number of private International and public state schools catering for the areas growing population.

Private schools include:

- British International School of Phnom Penh in Chong Prek, Sangkat Prek Aeng.
- DK SchoolHouse
- Southbridge International School Cambodia (SISC) within Peng Huoth's borey The Star Platinum Polaris I, in Sangkat Nirouth.
- CIA FIRST International School, Chbar Ampov in Beung Chhuk Village, Sangkat Nirouth
- Sovannaphumi School in Russei Sros Village, Sangkat Nirouth.
- Paññāsāstra International School (PSIS) in Deum Ampil, Sangkat Chbar Ampov I.
- BELTEI International School in Deum Ampil, Sangkat Chbar Ampov I.

== Images ==
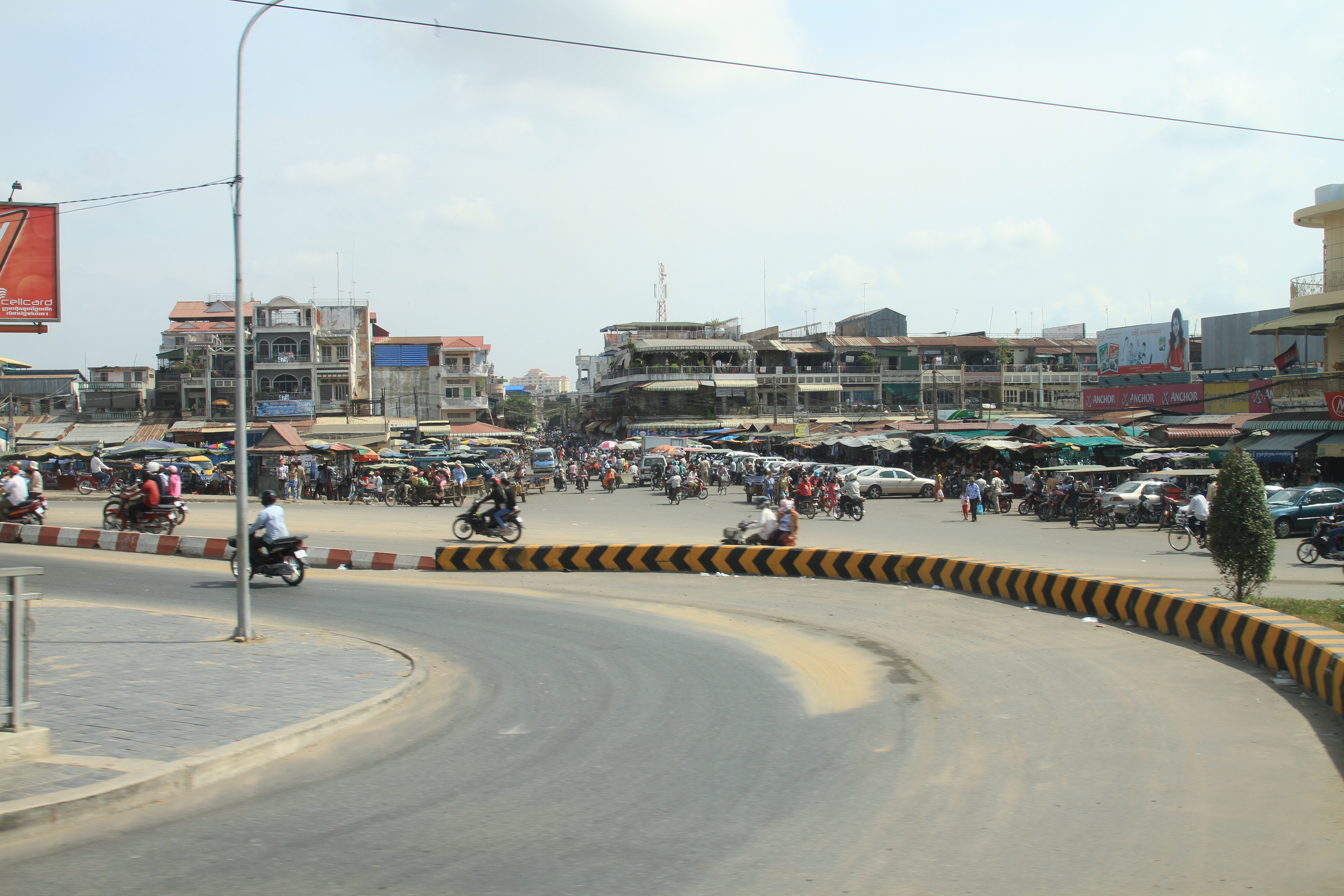
Sangkat Chbar Ampov Muoy
