= Boeng Keng Kang I =

Boeng Keng Kang I បឹងកេងកងទី១
- Quarter
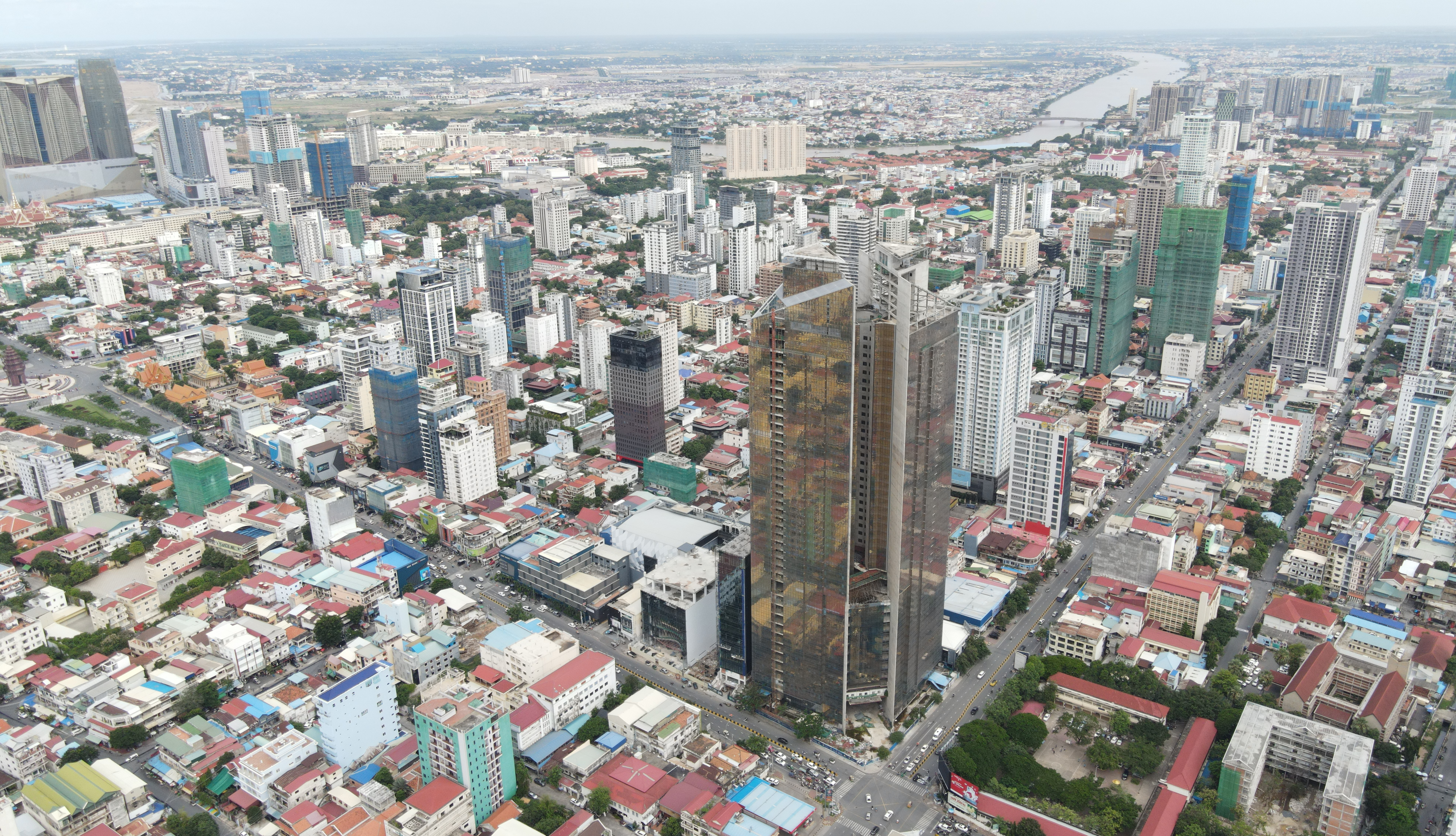
- Aerial View of Boeng Keng Kang I from North-West Side
- Interactive map of Boeng Keng Kang I
- Country: Cambodia
- Province: Phnom Penh
- Section: Boeng Keng Kang
- Time zone: UTC+07:00 (ICT)

Boeng Keng Kang I (BKKI; Khmer: បឹងកេងកងទី១) is a quarter (sangkat) in Boeng Keng Kang Section (formerly in Chamkar Mon Section), Phnom Penh, Cambodia.

It has the nickname NGOville due to the presence of non-governmental organizations. Melanie Brew of the Phnom Penh Post described it as a "hip, trendy area" in 2008. Brew added that "There is also a feeling for some that the area is a little bit too cosmopolitan or international and is divided or separated from the "real" Cambodia."

== Education ==
In regards to area international schools Brew stated they were "Some of the best schools in town".

Harrods International Academy has two campuses in Boeung Keng Kang I: the main campus and the early years campus. Additionally Home of English is also in the community. Brew stated that ICan British International School and Zaman International School are in proximity. The former campuses of British International School of Phnom Penh and International School of Phnom Penh (ISPP) were also in the community.
