= Harrods International Academy =

School in Phnom Penh, Cambodia

- Phnom Penh; Cambodia

Information
- Established: 2014; 12 years ago
- Head of school: Clark Stroupe

Harrods International Academy (HIA) is an international school in Phnom Penh, Cambodia, founded in 2014.As of 2025 Clark Stroupe is the Head of School. Its current campus finished construction circa 2019. It serves until grade 12. Harrods had used Class Dojo as its primary online learning platform, up until 2024. Currently, Harrods International Academy utilizes the Toddle online learning platform for the school's hybrid learning system.

There are eight campuses, but a new one opening, not all in Boeung Keng Kang District (these areas were in Chamkar Mon District until 2019): the main campus and the early year campus, both in Boeung Keng Kang I, and the Olympic Campus 1 in Toul Svay Prey 1.
