= Khan Mean Chey =

Mean Chey ខណ្ឌមានជ័យ
- District (Khan)
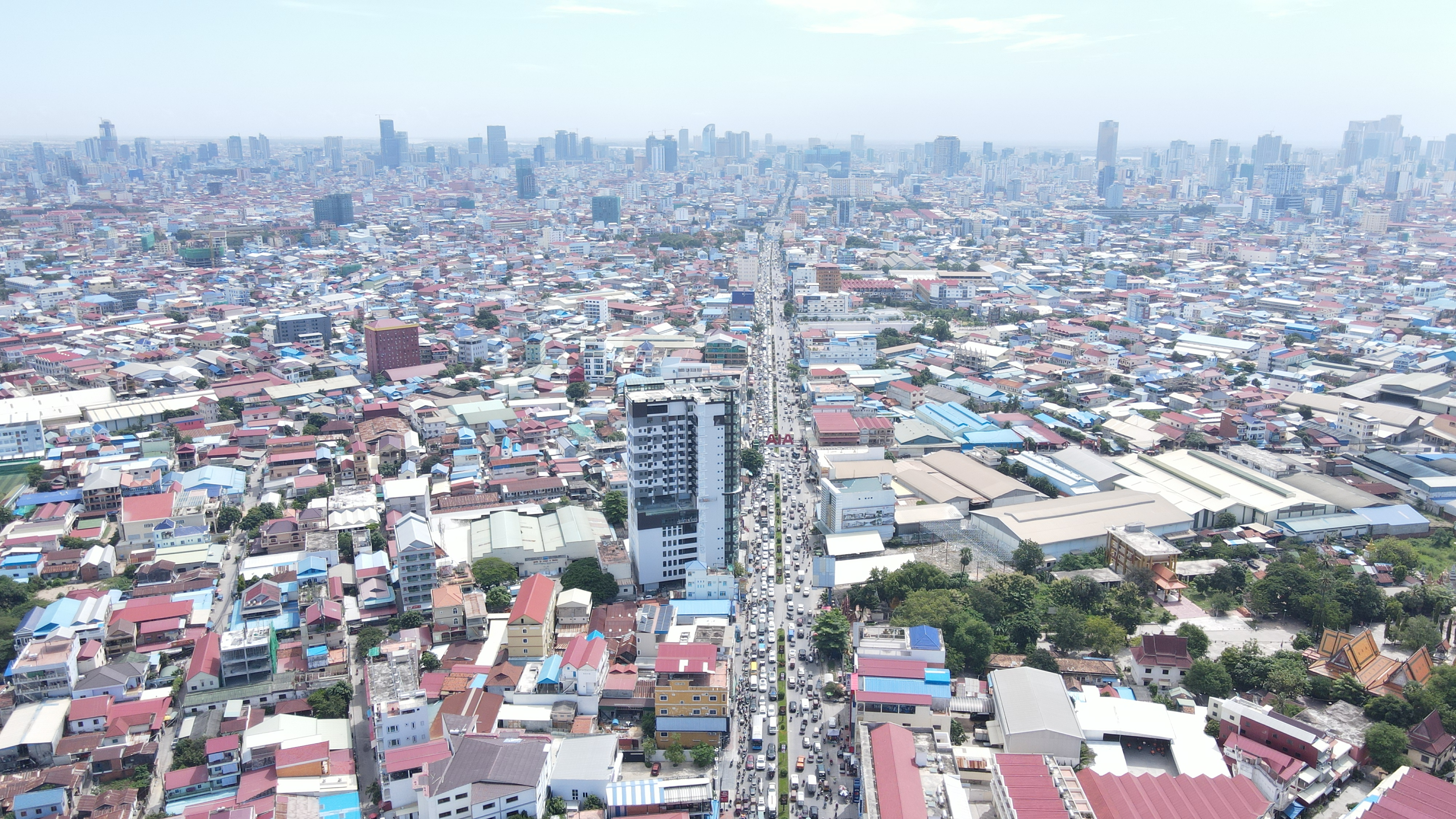
- Mean Chey Skyline

- Location within Cambodia
- Coordinates: 11°31′14″N 104°54′53″E
- Country: Cambodia
- Province: Phnom Penh

Area
  - Total: 29 km^{2} (11 sq mi)

Population (2019)
  - Total: ▼248,464
- Time zone: UTC+7 (Cambodia)
- Geocode: 1206

Mean Chey (Khmer: មានជ័យ, Méanchei [miəncəj], lit. "Victorious") is an administrative district (khan) located in the south-eastern part of Phnom Penh, Cambodia. As of 2019, due to boundary changes, its population decreased from 2008 but is the second most populous district of Phnom Penh.

== Administration ==
According to the 1998 census, Mean Chey consisted of eight Sangkats with a total population of 157,112; the population recorded by the 2008 census was 266,865.

In 2010 Khan Mean Chey was expanded by incorporating four communes from Kien Svay District, Kandal Province: Kbal Kaoh, Preaek Aeng, Preaek Thmei and Veal Sbov. In 2013, the latter four Sangkats, along with Chbar Ampov Ti Muoy, Chbar Ampov Ti Pir, Nirouth and Preaek Pra formed a new entity, Khan Chbar Ampov, taking Mean Chey's number of Sangkats to four. In 2016, Stueng Mean Chey was split in three separate Sangkats and Boeng Tumpun was split in two parts.

As of 2020, Mean Chey is subdivided into seven Sangkats (communes) and 59 Phums (villages).

Geocode	Sangkat (commune)	Phums (villages)
120606	Chak Angrae Leu	Prek Ta Kong, Prek Ta Nu, Prek Ta Kong I, Prek Ta Kong II, Prek Ta Kong III, Prek Ta Nu I, Prek Ta Nu II
120607	Chak Angrae Kraom	Tuol Roka, Prek Ta Long, Tuol Roka I, Tuol Roka II, Tuol Roka III, Prek Ta Long I, Prek Ta Long II, Prek Ta Long III
120608	Stueng Mean Chey 1	Mean Chey, Mean Chey I, Mean Chey II, Thmei, Trea, Trea I, Trea II, Trea III
120609	Stueng Mean Chey 2	Phneat, Damnak Thum, Damnak Thum I, Damnak Thum IV, Ruessei, Ruessei III, Prek Toal, Prek Toal I
120610	Stueng Mean Chey 3	Trea IV, Ruessei I, Ruessei II, Damnak Thum II, Damnak Thum III, Damnak Thum V
120611	Boeng Tumpun 1	Chamraeun Phal, Chamraeun Phal I, Chamraeun Phal II, Chamraeun Phal III, Chamraeun Phal IV, Sansam Kosal I, Sansam Kosal II, Sansam Kosal III, Sansam Kosal IV, Sansam Kosal V, Sansam Kosal VI
120612	Boeng Tumpun 2	Kbal Tumnob, Kbal Tumnob I, Kbal Tumnob II, Kbal Tumnob III, Tnaot Chrum, Tnaot Chrum I, Tnaot Chrum II, Tnaot Chrum III, Tnaot Chrum IV, Tnaot Chrum V, Tnaot Chrum VI

== Education ==
Since 2015 the campus of the International School of Phnom Penh (ISPP) is on Hun Neang Boulevard, in Mean Chey Section.

Home of English International School Prek Eng Branch is in Mean Chey Section.

National Institute of Business (NIB) is located Next to New Steung Mean Chey Market on Street 217 in Mean Chey Section. It was established in 1979.

== Buddhist temples ==
List of pagodas in Khan Mean Chey

- Wat Changkran Ta Prohm Steung Meanchey (Wat Steung Meanchey)
- Wat Sansam Kosal
- Wat Dombok Khpuos
- Wat Chak Angre Leu
- Wat Chak Angre Krom
- Wat Ang Porthi Nhean
- Wat Noun Mony
- Wat Samaki Raingsey

== Gallery ==
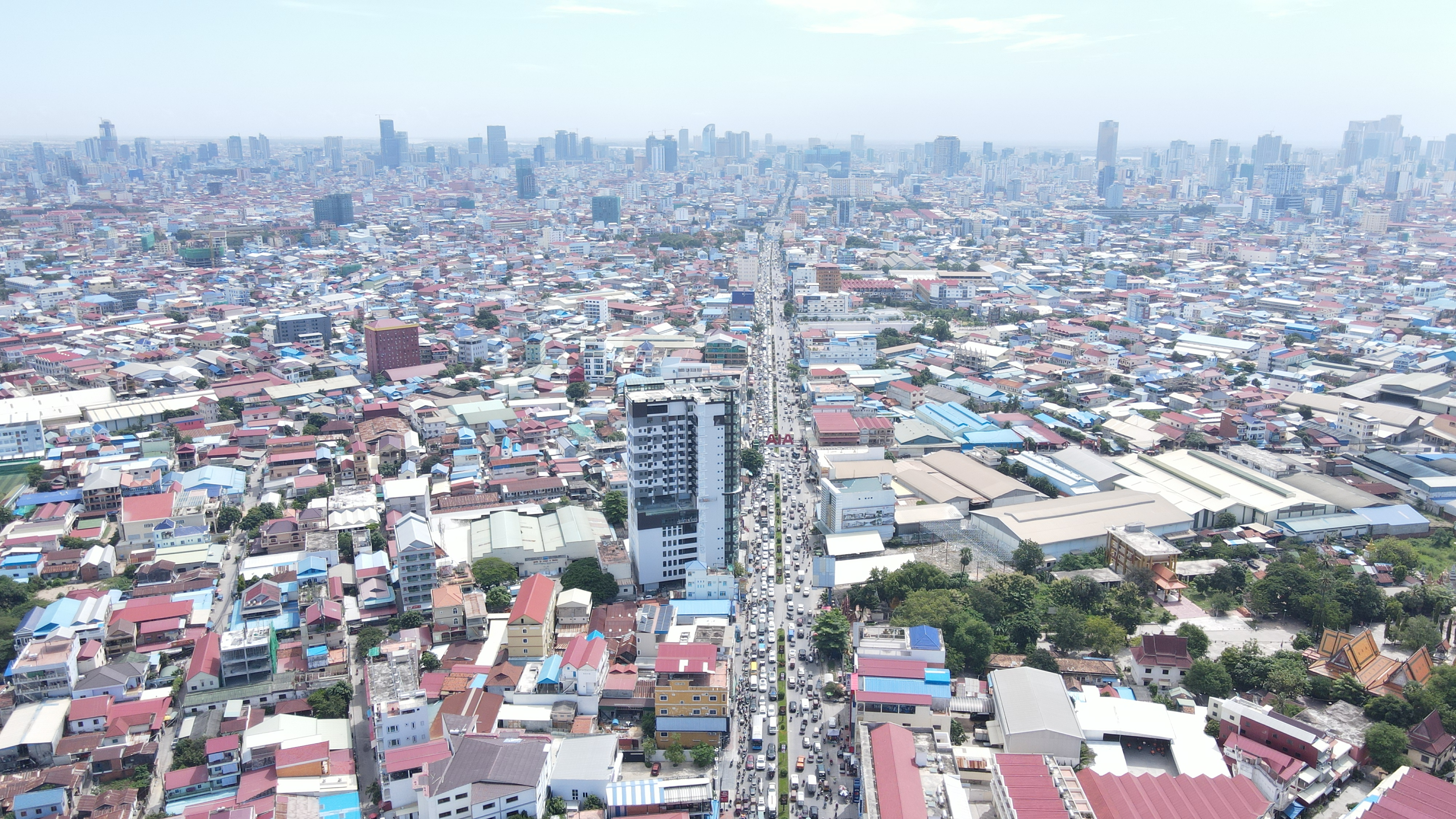
Mean Chey Skyline

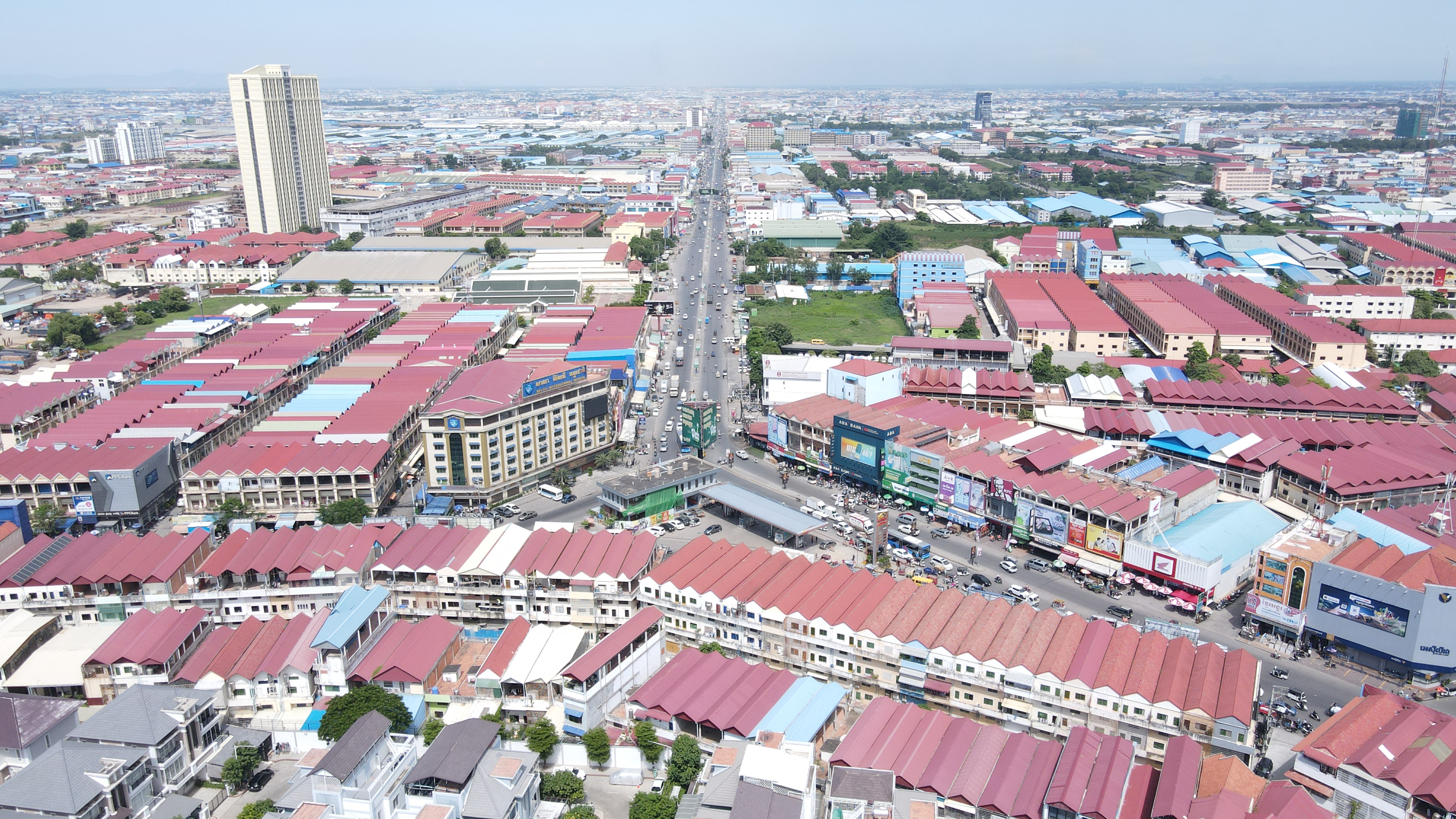
Veng Sreng Boulevard at Steung Mean Chey Junction

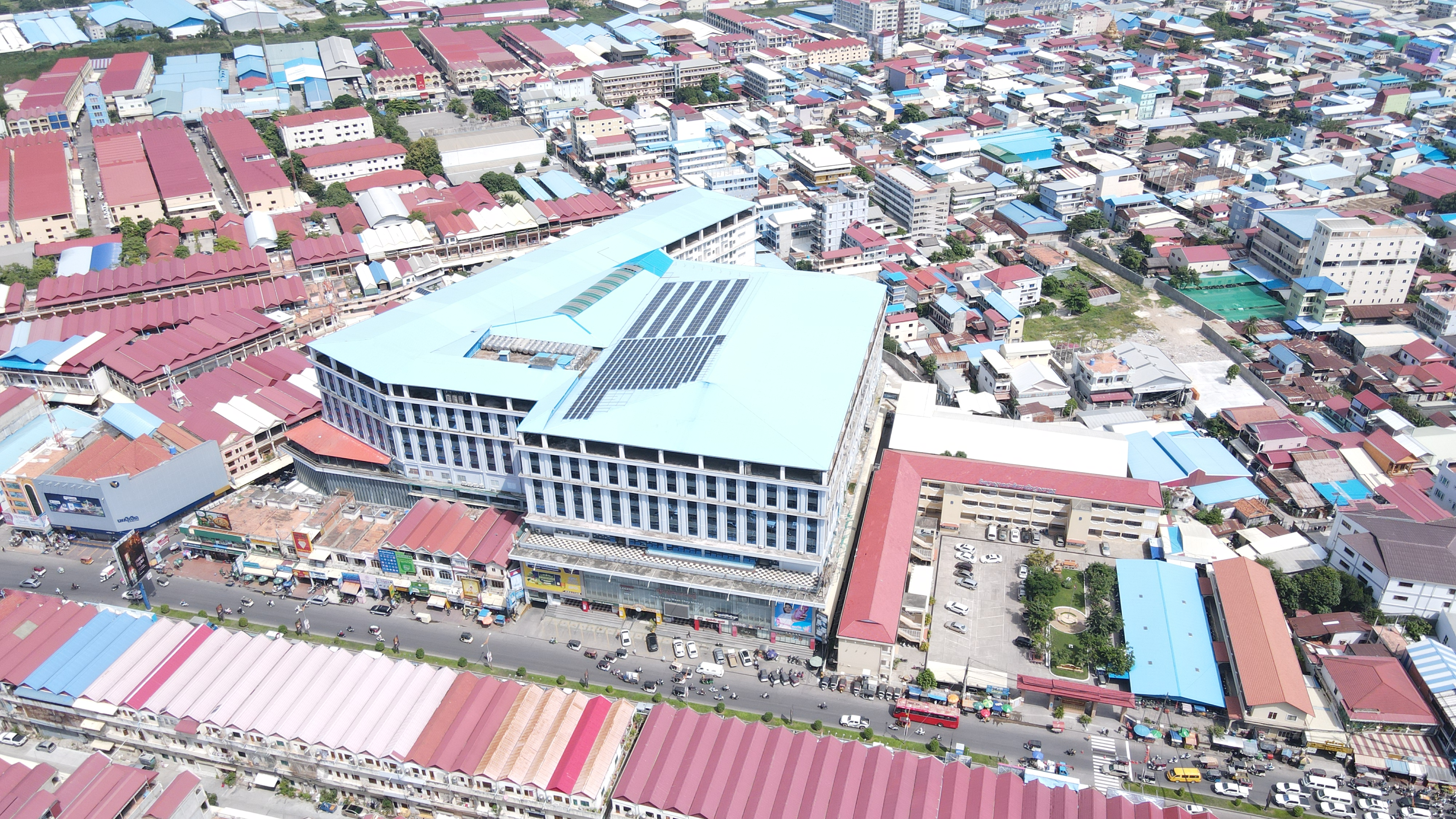
Aerial View of New Steung Mean Chey Market

New Steung Mean Chey Market in 2022

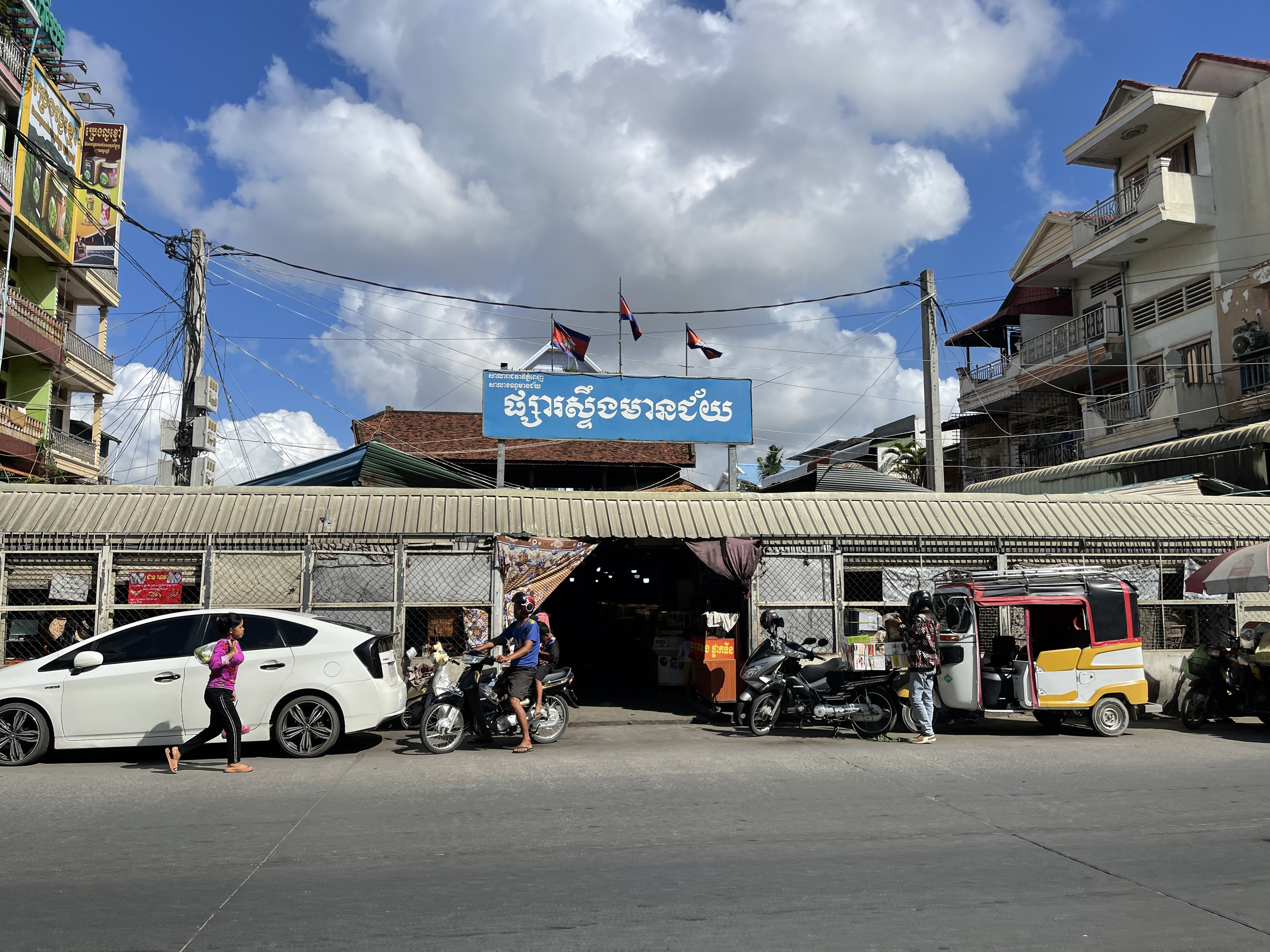
Steung Mean Chey Market

New Steung Mean Chey Market

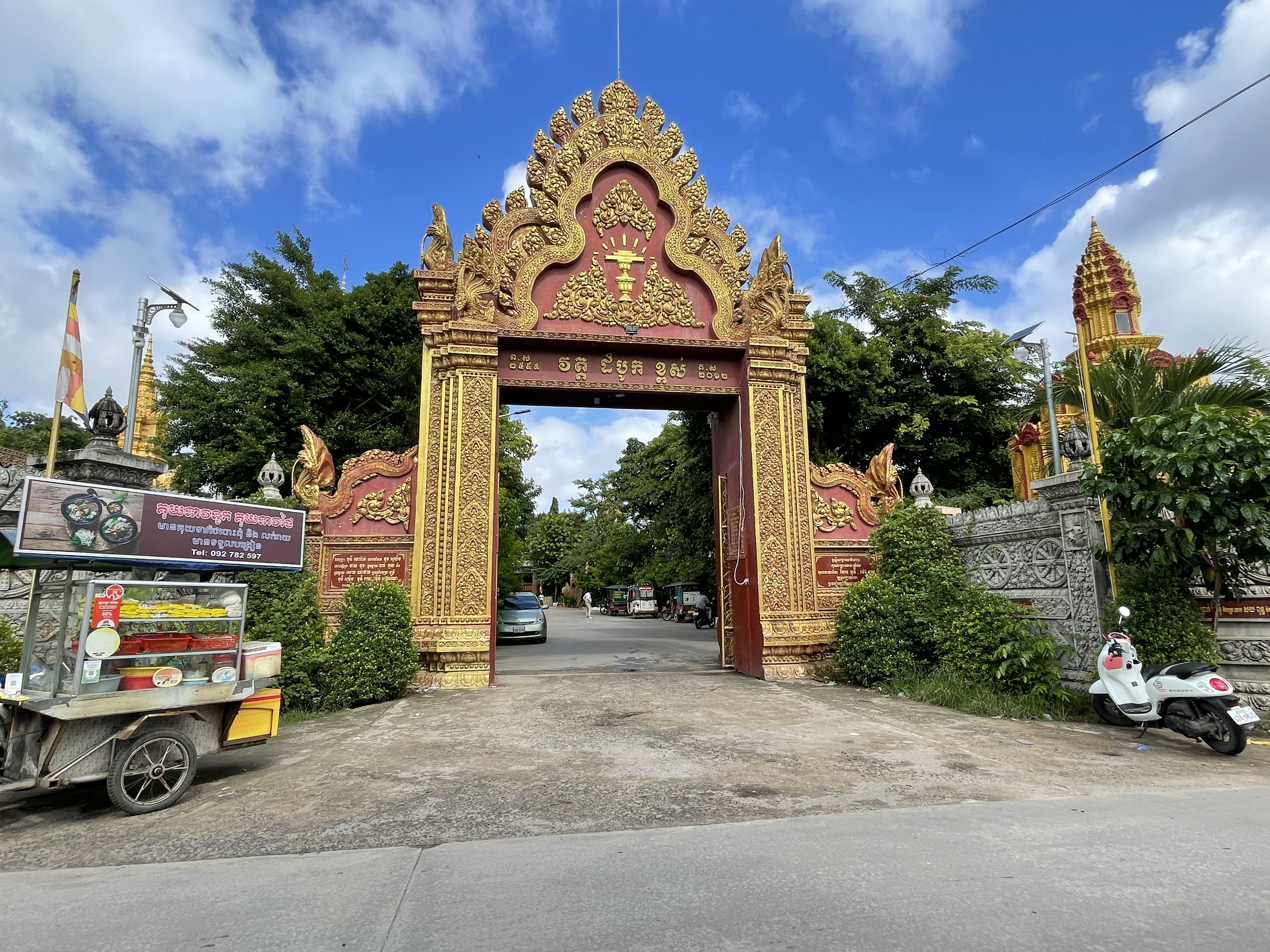
Wat Dombok Khpuos

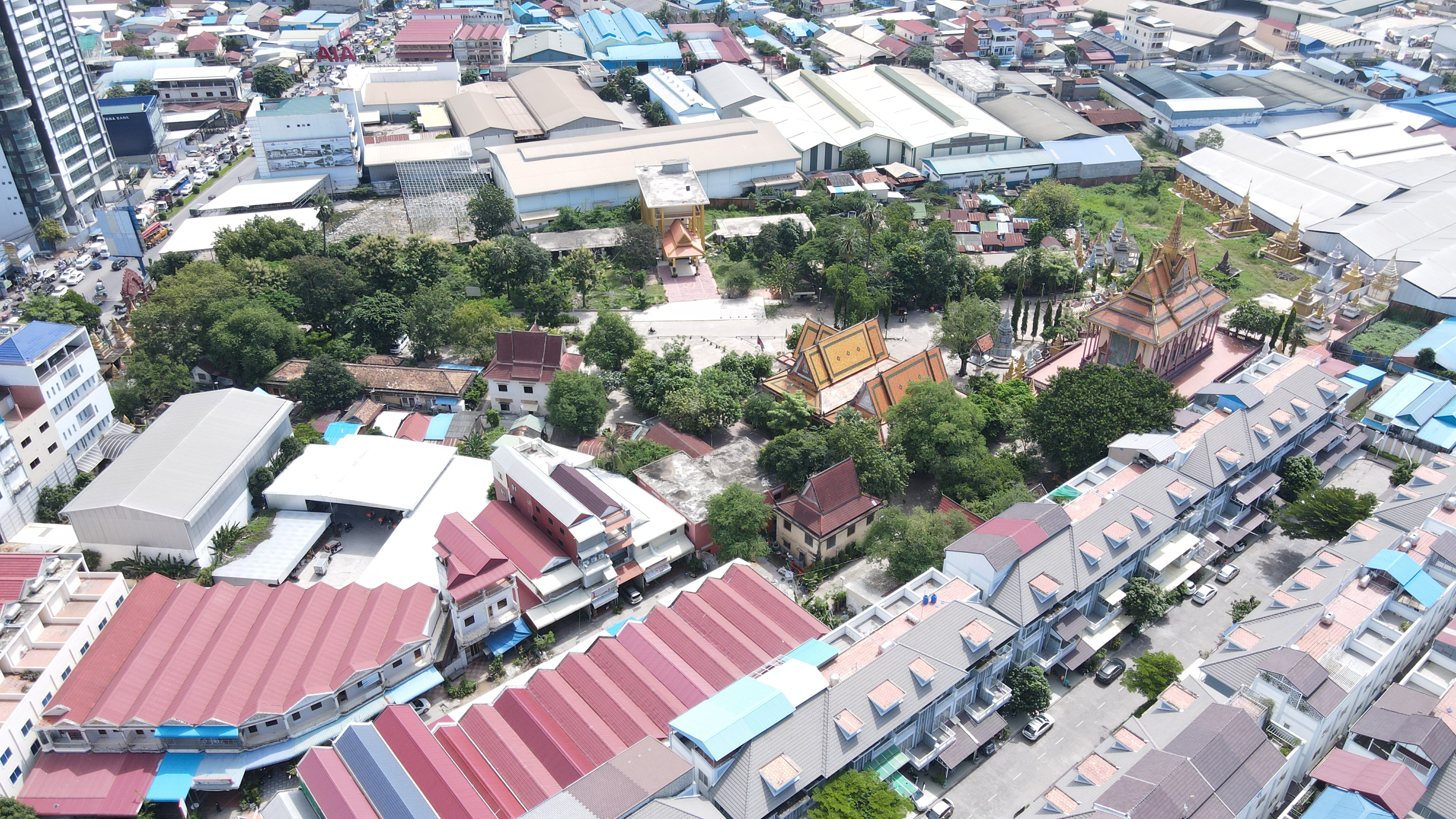
Aerial View of Wat Noun Mony

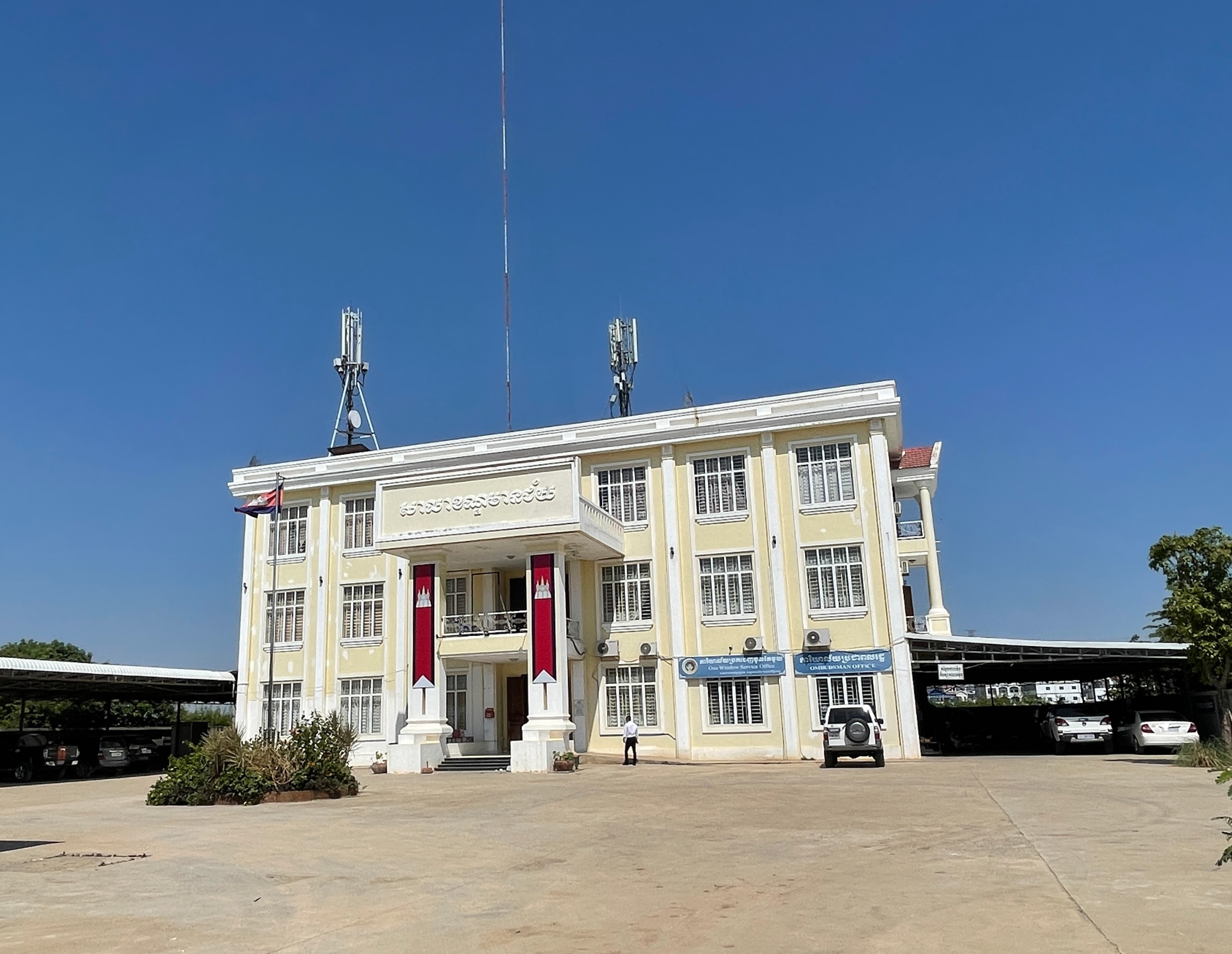
Mean Chey District Hall

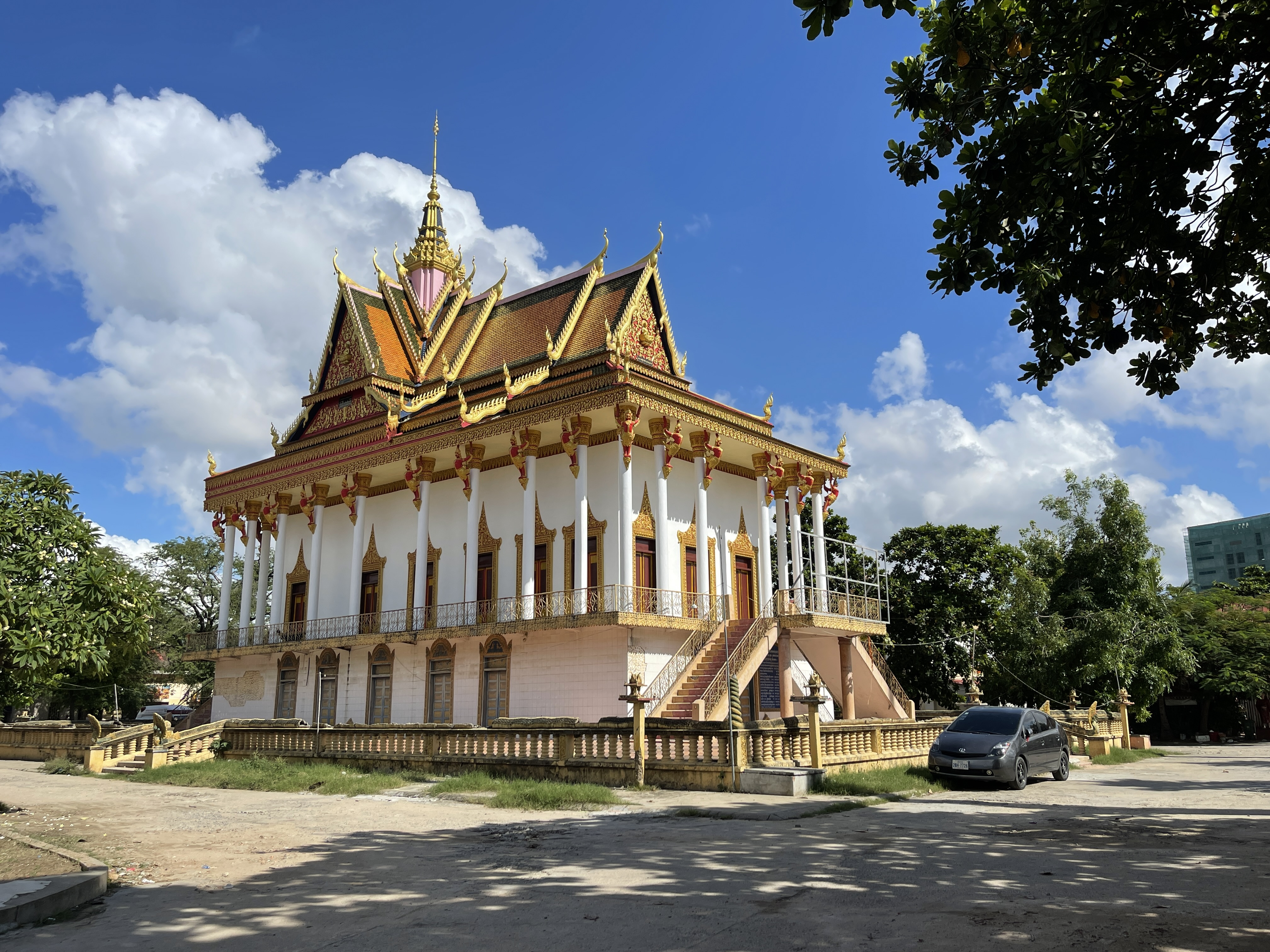
Temple of Wat Steung Mean Chey

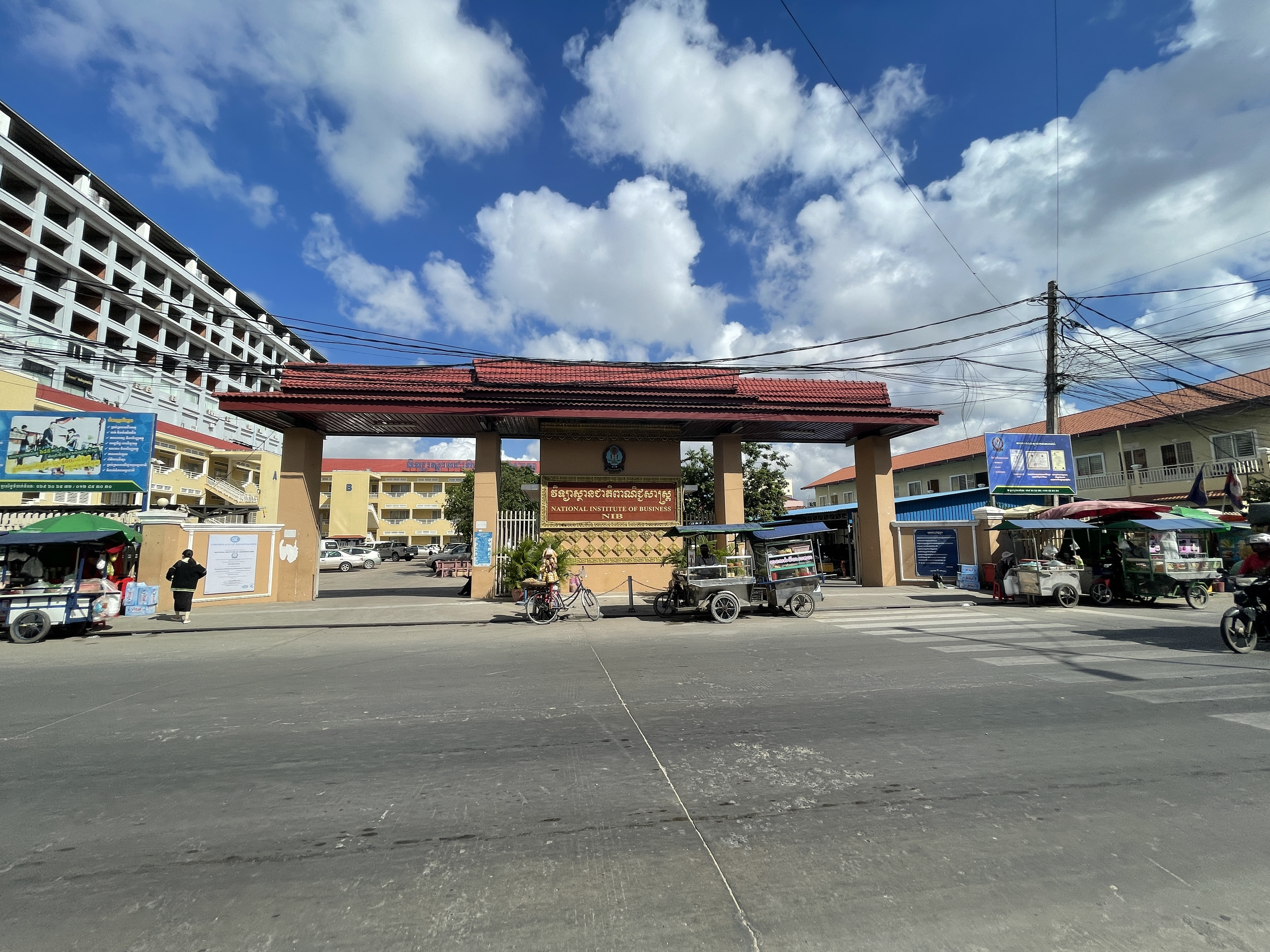
National Institute of Business (NIB)

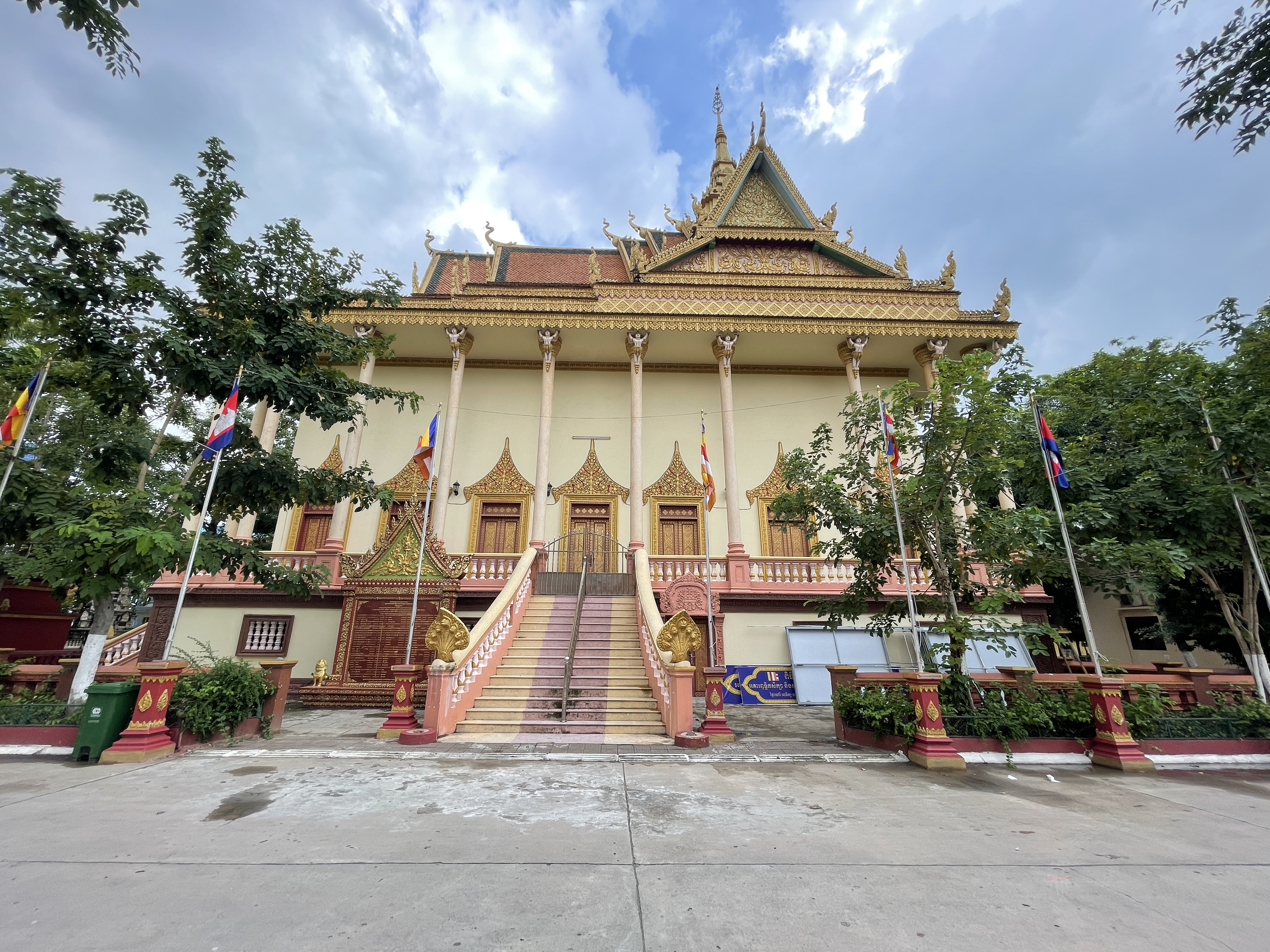
Wat Sansam Kosal
