= International School of Phnom Penh =

International School of Phnom Penh (ISPP)

Location
- Phnom Penh; Cambodia; 11°30′47″N 104°55′47″E

Information
- School type: Private, non-profit, co-educational.
- Motto: An IB World School Serving International Students in Phnom Penh
- Established: 1989
- Director: Eileen Niedermann
- Principal: Katie Ham (secondary school)
- Principal: Elizabeth Ford (elementary school)
- Website: http://www.ispp.edu.kh/

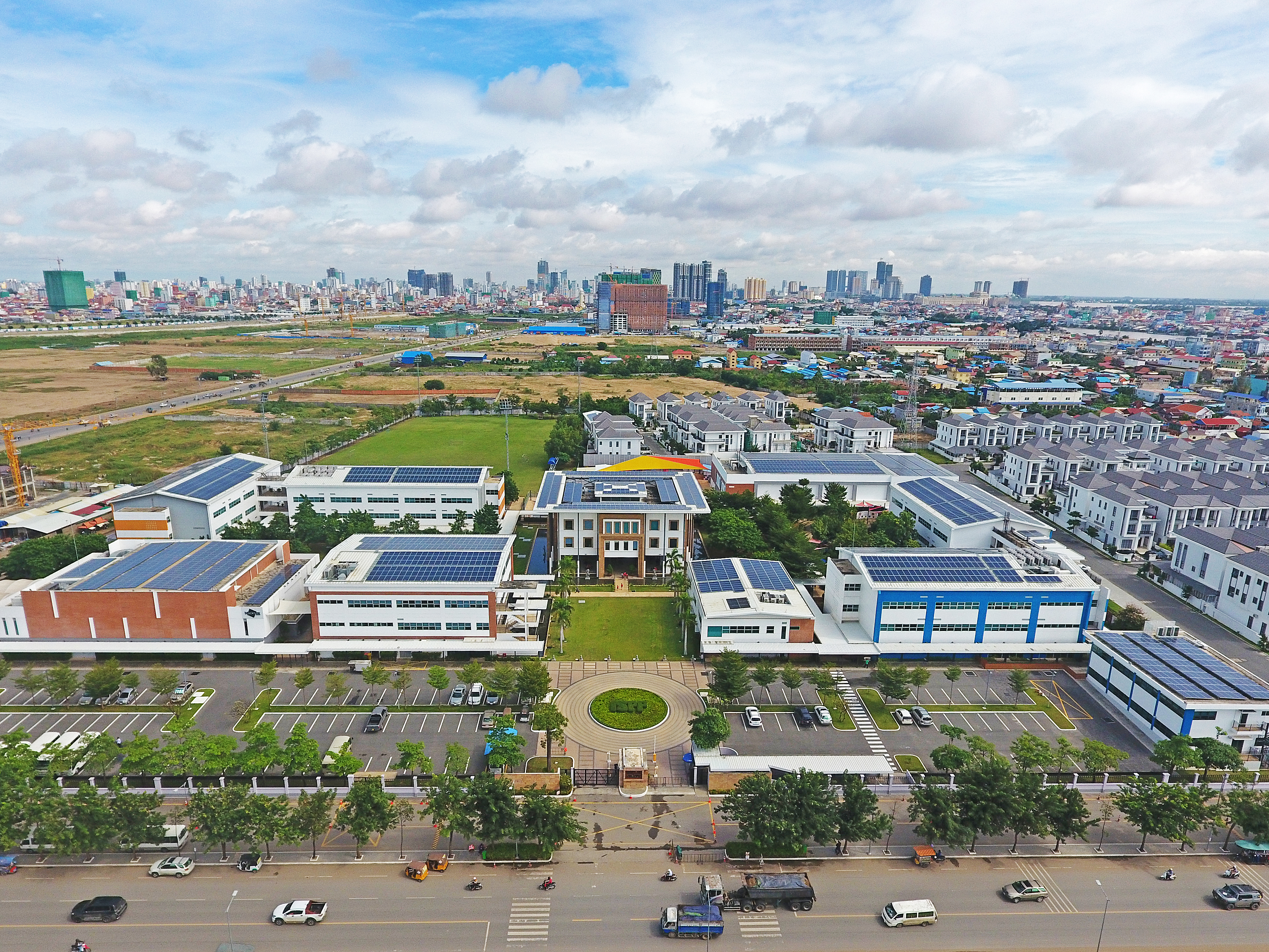
Aerial photo of ISPP International School of Phnom Penh

The International School of Phnom Penh (ISPP) is an international school located at the Mean Chey district in the city of Phnom Penh, Cambodia. It is a private, non-profit, English language, coeducational day school that offers educational programs starting at early years 1 through Grade 12. The school was founded in 1989. Around 900 students were enrolled for the year 2024 who represent 50 countries.

== History ==
ISPP was started in 1989 by a group of families working for NGOs (non-government organization). The first six students, aged three to seven, met part-time in a home taught by a parent.

In 1990, a villa was rented and ISPP took the first real steps to become a normal day school. A curriculum was developed and a Kindergarten to Grade 4 program was set in place. Student numbers gradually increased at the start of the school year reaching 11 pupils. ISPP's Charter was then written and approved, establishing it as a parent-owned and operated non-sectarian non-profit school.

By 1995, the full-time expatriate faculty numbered 14, and the student body 230. In February, following in-service training, the school developed an innovative approach to effectively meet the needs of the EAL learners at ISPP. A Biology laboratory was established for the secondary school along with the continued expansion of the Computer Lab and the Media Center.

Early in 1996, a formal learning support program was developed and a full-time learning support teacher was employed later that year. A strategic plan was also developed for the integration of technology into the ISPP curriculum. A technology committee was established to facilitate this plan.

In 1998 the school was a K–8 school with 30 students. That year Finansa Ltd had offered that ISPP take over a school owned by the company, International School of Cambodia (ISC), but according to the company, ISPP declined.

In 1998–99, the school presented for its final international accreditation with the Western Association of Schools and Colleges (WASC) following three years' provisional accreditation. The full accreditation visit took place in March 1999 and in May, the school was told that it had received a full 6-year accreditation at its first attempt. ISPP had then become the only fully internationally accredited school in Cambodia at the time.

In 1999–2000, the decision to become an IB World School was taken. The International Baccalaureate Organization carried out an authorization visit and approved the school as an IB Diploma school. In 2001, the school was also authorized to offer the Middle Years Programme of the IB. The authorization for the IB Primary Years Programme was given in September 2004.

During the academic year of 2004–05, the school was also accredited by the CIS and the WASC.

Finally, in 2009–10, the faculty produced a comprehensive self-study for the joint 5-year CIS/WASC/IB accreditation visit, which took place in April 2010. Subsequent accreditation visits have taken place in 2015 and 2021 to solidify ISPP's accreditation status with CIS, WASC and IB.

In 2014, the secondary school moved to a new, purpose-built campus south of the city centre. The elementary school joined in 2015, and both schools were housed on a single campus for the first time.

== Campus ==
Its current campus is on Hun Neang Boulevard, in Mean Chey Section.

The former campus of ISPP was in Boeung Keng Kang I, Chamkar Mon Section (now in Khan Boeng Keng Kang since 2019).

== Organization ==
The school operates under an agreement with the Royal Government of Cambodia through the Ministry of Education, Youth and Sport.

== Curriculum ==
ISPP is an International Baccalaureate World School, offering three IB programmes – Primary Years, Middle Years, and Diploma Programmes. The school's Early Years Programme (pre-kindergarten) is part of the PYP. Music, art, computer studies, physical education, swimming, and Khmer language classes are part of the curriculum for all grades. ISPP provides learning support, EAL support, and counseling services. The school runs an after-school program with a range of activities and language options. The School is fully accredited by the Western Association of Schools and Colleges and is a member of the Council of International Schools (CIS), European Council of International Schools (ECIS) and East Asia Regional Council of Overseas Schools (EARCOS).

The school year consists of 2 semesters, each of 2 terms, extending from early August to mid-December and from early January to early June.

== Faculty ==
There are approximately 110 faculty members. The faculty is multinational in makeup, with the majority coming from Australia, Canada, New Zealand, the United Kingdom, and the United States.

== Facilities ==
Since 2015, the school has been located completely on a purpose-built campus on Hun Neang Boulevard, Phnom Penh. The 6-hectare campus includes an Olympic-sized swimming pool, a 430-seat theatre, two libraries, a cafeteria and café, three basketball courts, and full-sized football pitches/sports fields. Classroom facilities include well-equipped science labs, music and art rooms, computer and media labs, and a design and technology workshop.

== Sports ==
The International School of Phnom Penh (ISPP) maintains a comprehensive sports program designed to promote physical fitness, teamwork, and personal growth among students. The school emphasizes participation, sportsmanship, and character development, encouraging students to learn from both successes and setbacks. ISPP’s sports philosophy focuses on student development, intercultural understanding, and community engagement alongside competitive achievement.

ISPP competes in both local and regional leagues. Previously, the school participated in the International Schools’ Sports Association Phnom Penh (ISSAPP), which organized seasonal tournaments for various sports. As of mid-2025, the school has joined PPAC8, a league where eight local schools compete with each other. Regionally, ISPP is a member of the Mekong River International Schools Association (MRISA), sending teams to multi-day tournaments in Southeast Asia, including Cambodia, Vietnam, Laos, and Thailand, where they have achieved multiple championship victories. These competitions provide opportunities for students to experience cross-cultural engagement and represent the school in friendly, structured competition.

The school offers a wide range of sports across grade levels. Secondary students (Grades 6–12) participate in team sports such as basketball, volleyball, and football (soccer), typically with separate junior and senior divisions for boys and girls. Teams are often organized into A and B squads, with training sessions twice weekly. ISPP also provides individual and recreational sports opportunities including cross country, track and field, badminton, and swimming. Elementary students (Grades 4–5) have access to beginner team sports, while younger students participate in the Young Athletes of Phnom Penh (YAPP) program, focusing on introductory sports activities such as T-ball and dodgeball.

ISPP has achieved notable success in competitive sports. In the 2023–24 school year, its teams, known as the Falcons, won seven MRISA championships and nine ISSAPP championships, marking one of the school’s most successful seasons. The swim team earned numerous age-group awards, broke school and meet records, and many students achieved personal bests. High levels of participation and parent/community involvement have contributed to ISPP’s thriving sports culture, with volunteers supporting events and students actively engaging in after-school athletic programs.

The school’s extensive facilities support these programs, including two basketball courts, full-sized sports fields, and an Olympic-sized swimming pool. In addition to competitive teams, the After School Programme offers recreational sports and activities designed to build skills, confidence, and social interaction outside formal competition.

=== Swimming ===
ISPP has a robust swimming program serving students from Grades 1 through 12. The program emphasizes skill development, water safety, and competitive readiness. Students interested in competitive swimming undergo assessments that evaluate proficiency in different strokes, endurance, and racing techniques. Competitive swimmers participate in local meets, previously organized by ISSAPP, and continue to compete in regional competitions through MRISA, where they have achieved multiple awards and set school records.

The school’s Olympic-sized swimming pool provides a professional environment for both training and competition. Training sessions focus on improving technique, stamina, and race strategy, and are integrated into the broader athletics curriculum. In addition to competitive swimming, ISPP offers recreational swimming opportunities through its After School Programme, promoting water confidence and fitness for students of all levels.

== Finances ==
For the 2025–26 school year, annual fees at the International School of Phnom Penh are as follows:

- Early Years 1 / PEY: US$9,558
- Early Years 2: US$11,680
- Kindergarten to Grade 5: US$23,300
- Grades 6–10: US$27,544
- Grades 11–12: US$29,533

One-time fees include a US$250 application fee and a US$3,500 entrance fee (Kindergarten to Grade 12). Early Years students pay a deposit of US$750 per year, credited toward the entrance fee upon entry to Kindergarten. An annual re-enrolment deposit of US$750 is also required.
