= Home of English International School =

Cambodian private school

- Phnom Penh; Cambodia

Information
- Established: 1993; 33 years ago
- Founder: Judy Tan; Steve Billington

Home of English International is a private school in Phnom Penh, Cambodia, established in 1997. Originally started by founders Steve Billington and Judy Tan in Indonesia 1993, the 1997 Asian financial crisis forced them to move to Cambodia where the school has continued to grow.

Home of English International, driven by their motto "a place where people care," regularly donates to charities, orphanages, and also sponsors a school in Kampong Speu (town).

It has four campuses: two are in Boeng Keng Kang 3 Sangkat in Boeng Keng Kang Section: the Head Office and the Play School/Kindergarten. Additionally there is the Toul Kork Branch in Sen Sok Section and the Prek Eng Branch in Mean Chey Section.
