= Paragon International School (Cambodia) =

- សាលារៀនអន្តរជាតិផារ៉ាហ្គន
- Phnom Penh; Cambodia

Information
- Type: Private
- Motto: Learn Today for a Better Tomorrow!
- Established: 1997
- Enrollment: 1,100
- Website: www.paragonisc.edu.kh

Paragon International School (Formerly Zaman International School) is a private bilingual international school in Cambodia's capital, Phnom Penh. Paragon ISC is certified by the Cambodian Ministry of Education, is a Council of International Schools accredited school, and is accepted by the University of Cambridge International Centre.

== History ==
Paragon International School was founded in 1997 by Atilla Yusuf Guleker and is certified by the Cambodian Ministry of Education. It is CIS (Council of International Schools) Accredited.

From 1997 to 2005 the school was housed in two purpose-converted buildings situated in a central location in street 71 off Mao Tse Toung Boulevard near the junction with Monivong Boulevard.

Paragon ISC High School is located in a distinctively modern building next to the Russian Embassy, in Sangkat Tonle Bassac. The Kindergarten and Primary campuses as well as the Paragon University are in the Toul Kork region of city.

== Campuses ==
Paragon International School is one of Cambodia's independent international schools and has an enrollment of over 1,100 students.

== Academics ==
Paragon International School is a day school, offering courses designed for students aged four to eighteen years who seek an international education in Phnom Penh.

Facilities at Paragon ISC Secondary Campus include: basketball and volleyball courts, a football field, a library, a dormitory, physics, biology, and chemistry laboratories, a computer lab, a theater, classrooms, an art room, music room, and a cafeteria all situated on a 7600 m^{2} campus.

== See also ==
- Zaman University
