= British International School of Phnom Penh =

International school in Phnom Penh, Cambodia

Information
- Established: 1995
- Age: 2 to 18
- Language: English
- Website: https://www.bispp.edu.kh/

British International School of Phnom Penh is an international school in Sangkat Prek Eng, Khan Chbar Ampov, Phnom Penh, Cambodia.

It was formerly in the Boeung Keng Kang I area of Phnom Penh.

It was established in 1995.
