= Tonlé Bassac (commune) =

Tonlé Bassac ទន្លេបាសាក់
- Commune
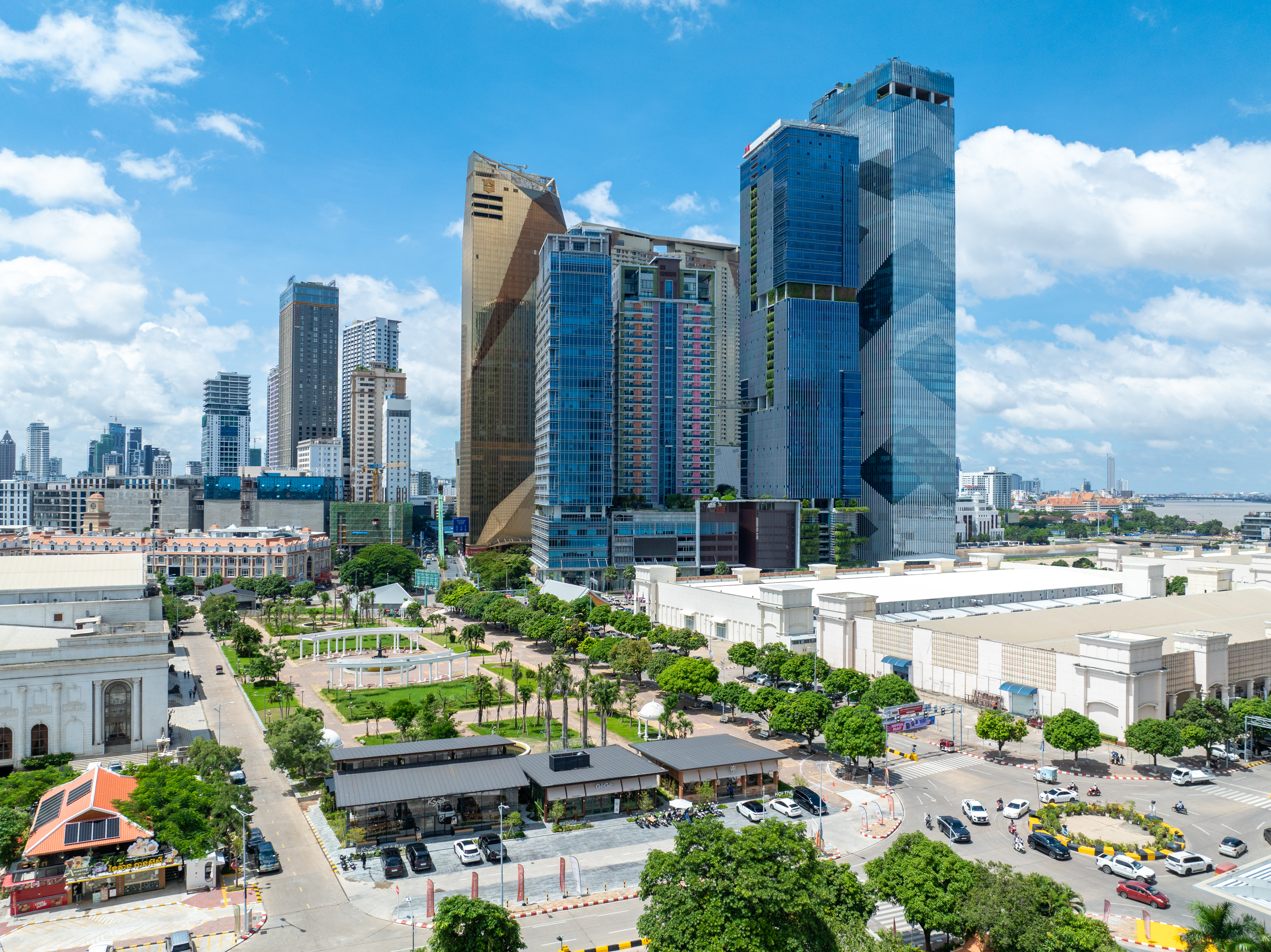
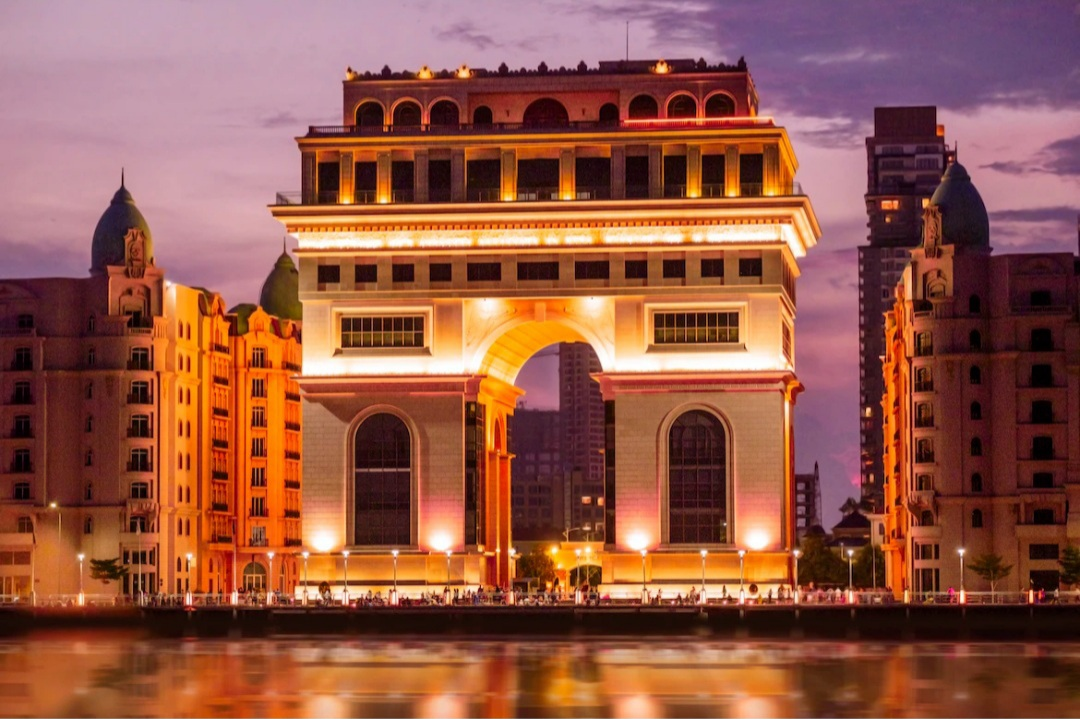
- From Top to Bottom: 1.Tonle Bassac Koh Pich CBD: 2. National Assembly of Cambodia; 3. Tuol Sleng Genocide Museum; 4. Nagaworld Gaming Complex; 5. Koh Pich - The Elysée; 6. Mekong River Cruise
- Interactive map of Tonlé Bassac
- Country: Cambodia
- Province: Phnom Penh
- District: Chamkar Mon

Area
  - Total: 4.66 km^{2} (1.80 sq mi)

Population (2019)
  - Total: 29,998
- Time zone: UTC+07:00 (ICT)

Tonlé Bassac (Khmer: ទន្លេបាសាក់) is a commune (sangkat) of Chamkar Mon District in Phnom Penh, Cambodia. Lying beside the Bassac River, the area has become a hub of development projects in the last decade, drawing comparisons with Marina Bay, Singapore.

Today, Tonle Bassac is known as the Embassy Zone of Phnom Penh with at least 20 countries and the United Nations basing their Cambodian embassies there. Tonle Bassac is also the site of most Cambodian ministries including Cambodia's National Parliament, the National Assembly.

Tonle Bassac is also renowned for having its own island, Koh Pich (Diamond Island). Koh Pich is a 100-hectare island and has been transformed into a high-end real estate and central business district in Phnom Penh, Cambodia. It is also known as the Green Lung of Phnom Penh where numerous parks and its waterfront promenade cater to different ground and water sports.

The area of Tonle Bassac is home to some of the tallest buildings in Cambodia such as The Peak, The Bridge, The Morgan Towers and others.

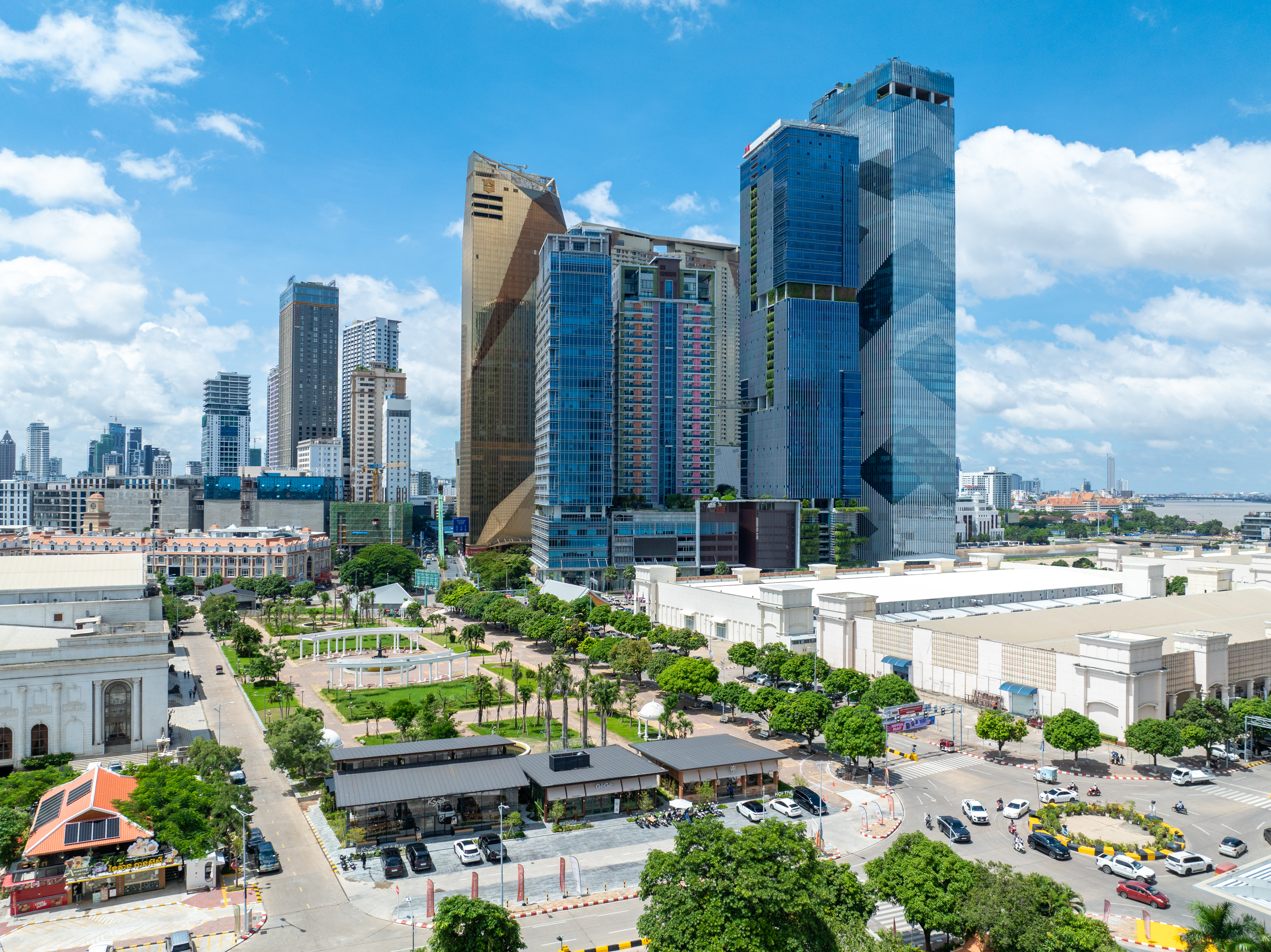
Koh Pich Central Business District (CBD)

Tonle Bassac serves as a major upscale commercial, diplomatic, and high-end real estate hub housing key government ministries, foreign embassies, luxury skyscrapers, and popular lifestyle and nightlife districts.

== Geography ==
The area extends from the banks of the Bassac River in the east, to National Highway One in the south, across to Monivong Boulevard in the west, and Samdach Preah Sihanouk Boulevard in the north. The area is home to the Phsar Kapko market and various cultural boutiques and modern restaurants.

== Planned developments ==
- The $2 billion, 560m (1,837 ft) Thai Boon Roong Twin Tower World Trade Center
- Naga 3. Further expansion of the NagaWorld Integrated Complex, Naga 3 is poised to add more non-gaming facilities, retail space and hotel room to the Complex.

== Entertainment ==
NagaWorld, Phnom Penh, Cambodia

=== NagaWorld Integrated Resort ===
Tonle Bassac is home to the NagaWorld Integrated Resort. It is the only premium luxury casino in Cambodia and is the only casino in Phnom Penh. NagaWorld holds the sole monopoly rights in Phnom Penh until 2045.

Naga 1 first opened its doors in 1995, followed by the completion of Naga 2 in 2017. Together, the integrated NagaWorld complex spans roughly 2 million square feet and offers 1,658 elegant rooms and suites.

The property boasts lavish public and VIP gaming halls, more than 20 dining and nightlife venues, two exclusive all-suite spas, Cambodia’s pioneering underground duty-free shopping arcade, and a wide array of entertainment options—including the impressive 2,000-seat NABA Theatre located within Naga 2.

The venue also offers ultra-premium meeting facilities equipped with top of the line technology. This includes one of the nation’s largest hotel convention spaces—a pillarless ballroom capable of seating over 1,000 delegates. The venue has previously hosted large-scale MICE delegations such as Cambodia-ASEAN Business Summit, International CSR & Sustainability Summit and others.

NagaWorld Key Specifications:

- Total event space: 2,900 square metres
- Meeting rooms: 7 meeting rooms, with capacity for 1,960 delegates
- Grand Ballroom: A pillarless ballroom spanning over 1,100 square metres, capable of hosting 1,600 delegates conference-style or 700 guests for banquets
- Largest convention space: Cambodia’s largest hotel convention spaces, accommodating more than 1,000 delegates
- Theatre: A sophisticated, state-of-the-art 2,000-seat NABA Theatre
- Accommodation: 1,658 luxurious rooms and suites

Naga 3 is currently being planned. Naga 3 is projected to further expand non-gaming facilities, retail space and hotel rooms in the NagaWorld Integrated Resort.

=== Bassac Lane ===
Bassac Lane is known for its nightlife. Lined with speakeasy bars, music venues, and clubs, the area gets busy after sunset. Visitors and locals gather along the street for craft cocktails and live music across various genres. This area also has a large selection of restaurants serving different cuisines.

== Shopping ==
Aeon Mall Phnom Penh

=== Aeon Mall Phnom Penh ===
AEON Mall Phnom Penh, Cambodia’s first large-scale modern shopping complex, officially opened on June 30, 2014. Situated along Sothearos Boulevard in the heart of Phnom Penh, the 68,000-square-meter mall houses around 190 shops and dining outlets, an AEON department/grocery store, a major cinema, and a variety of family-friendly entertainment facilities.

=== The Bridge Lifestyle Mall ===
Located in Phnom Penh’s Tonle Bassac district, The Bridge Lifestyle Mall is a key retail hub within The Bridge mixed-use development. Operated by the well-known Mall Company, the five-story complex spans 30,000 square meters and offers a wide variety of shopping and lifestyle experiences. Visitors can explore fashion boutiques, electronics and home goods stores, health and medical services, entertainment venues, as well as numerous dining and beverage options.

Standing at 45 storeys tall (154 metres), The Bridge is a striking landmark in central Phnom Penh. The development features a five-level retail podium topped by two distinctive tower blocks, seamlessly connected through iconic twin skybridges that provide convenient access to the full array of amenities within the complex. This integrated development is home to Residential units (Condos, Penthouses), Soho units and retail commercial spaces.

=== Noro Lane Boutique Mall ===
Chip Mong Noro Mall, located in Phnom Penh’s Tonle Bassac district, is a boutique lifestyle destination designed for the middle to upper-middle retail segment. Covering 7,900 square meters, the mall features an Organic Supermarket, F&B outlets, select retail shops, and a Cinema Complex for entertainment.

=== The Peak Integrated Development ===
Rising 55 storeys above Tonle Bassac (236 metres), The Peak is a freehold mixed-use landmark spanning approximately 12,609 square meters. The development comprises two residential towers and a commercial tower—home to offices and a hotel—set atop a five-level retail podium.

Across its two towers, The Peak offers 1,014 residential units and 250 office spaces. In 2023, the city welcomed its first Shangri-La Hotel within the complex, featuring more than 300 rooms.

The retail podium, managed by the Bluebell Group, brings over six decades of expertise as Asia’s leading brand distributor. With a network of more than 150 brand partners, Bluebell operates across 10 markets including Japan, China, Hong Kong, Macau, Taiwan, South Korea, Singapore, Malaysia, Cambodia, and Australia.

== Culture ==
Tonle Sleng Genocide Museum

Tonle Bassac is a well-known cultural hub with traditional Khmer architecture buildings and temples. Tonle Bassac hosts some of Cambodia's best known cultural and memorial sites, attracting numerous international and domestic tourists to the area.

=== Tonle Sleng Genocide Museum ===
Tonle Bassac is home to the Tuol Sleng Genocide Museum which commemorates the Cambodian genocide during the Khmer Rouge Regime. The site is a former secondary school that had been turned into an internment facility known as Security Prison 21[b] (S-21) by the Khmer Rouge regime from 1975 until its fall in 1979. From 1976 to 1979, an estimated 20,000 people were imprisoned at Tuol Sleng; it was one of between 150 and 196 torture and execution centers established by the Khmer Rouge and their secret police.

Independence Monument in Phnom Penh, Cambodia

=== Independence Monument ===
The Independence Monument (Khmer: វិមានឯករាជ្យ [ʋimiən ʔaekariəc]) in Phnom Penh, capital of Cambodia, was built in 1958 to memorialise Cambodia's independence from France in 1953. It stands on a roundabout in the intersection of Norodom Boulevard and Sihanouk Boulevard in the centre of the city. It is in the form of a lotus-shaped stupa, of the style seen at the temple at Banteay Srei and other Khmer historical sites.

Norodom Sihanouk Memorial, Tonle Bassac

=== Norodom Sihanouk Memorial ===
The Norodom Sihanouk Memorial, also called the Statue of King Father Norodom Sihanouk, is a monument commemorating former King Norodom Sihanouk located in Phnom Penh, Cambodia. The bronze statue is 4.5 meters tall and is housed under a 27 meter high stupa in the park east of the Independence Monument.

The statue is dedicated to Sihanouk's accomplishment on liberating the country on 9 November 1953 from the French colonialism.

== Koh Pich (Diamond Island) ==
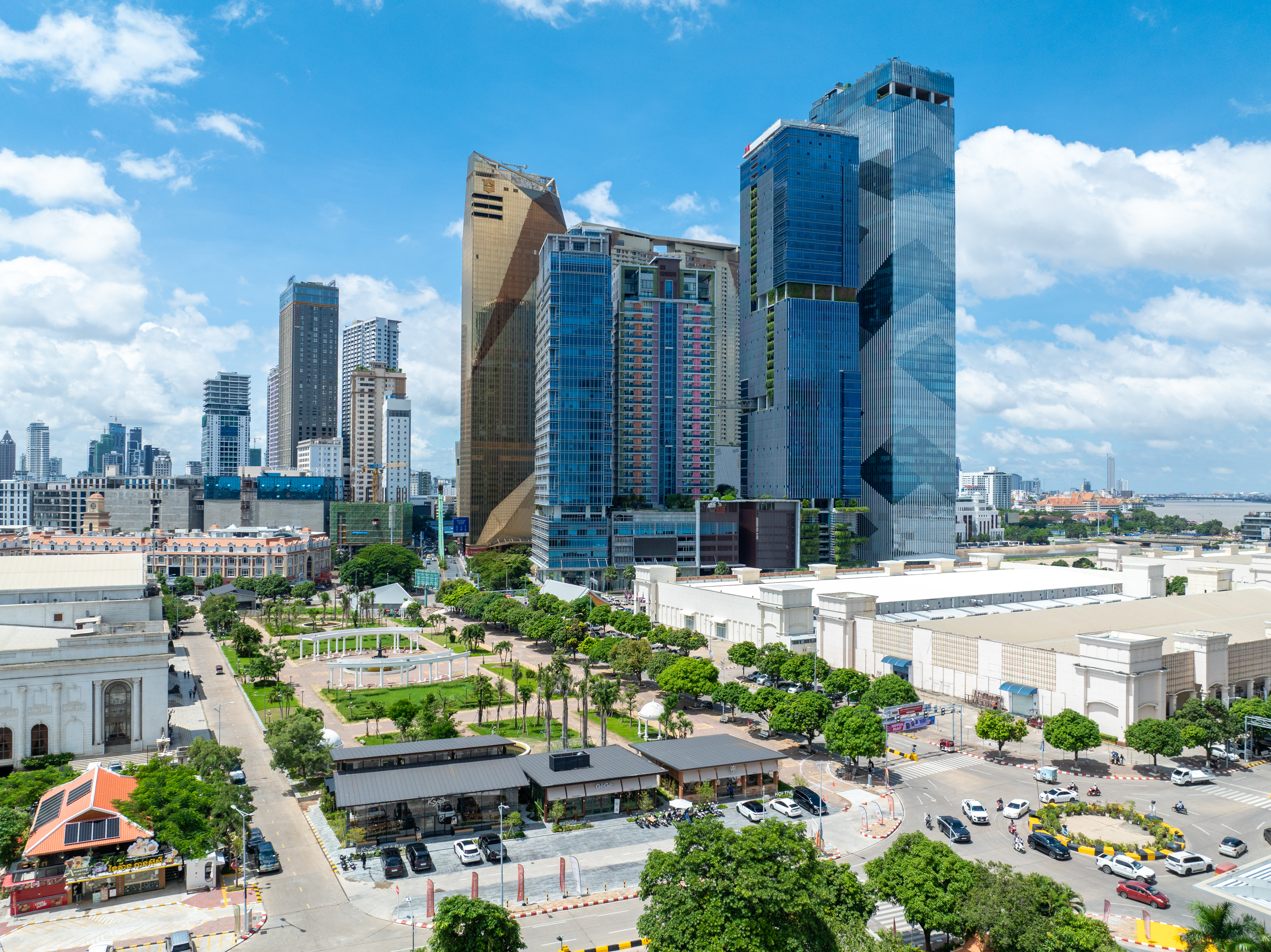
Koh Pich Central Business District (CBD)

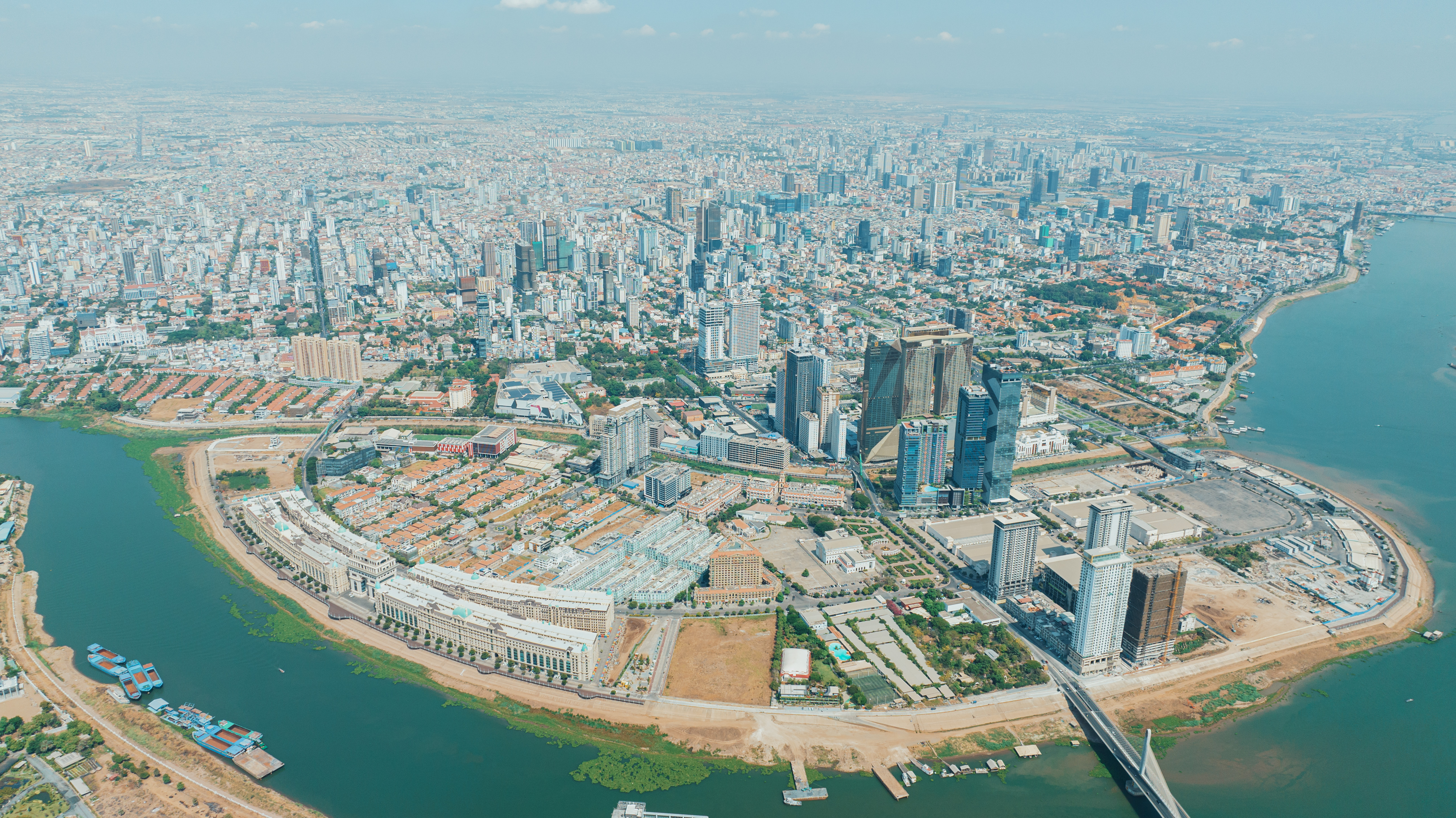
Drone view of Koh Pich and Downtown Phnom Penh

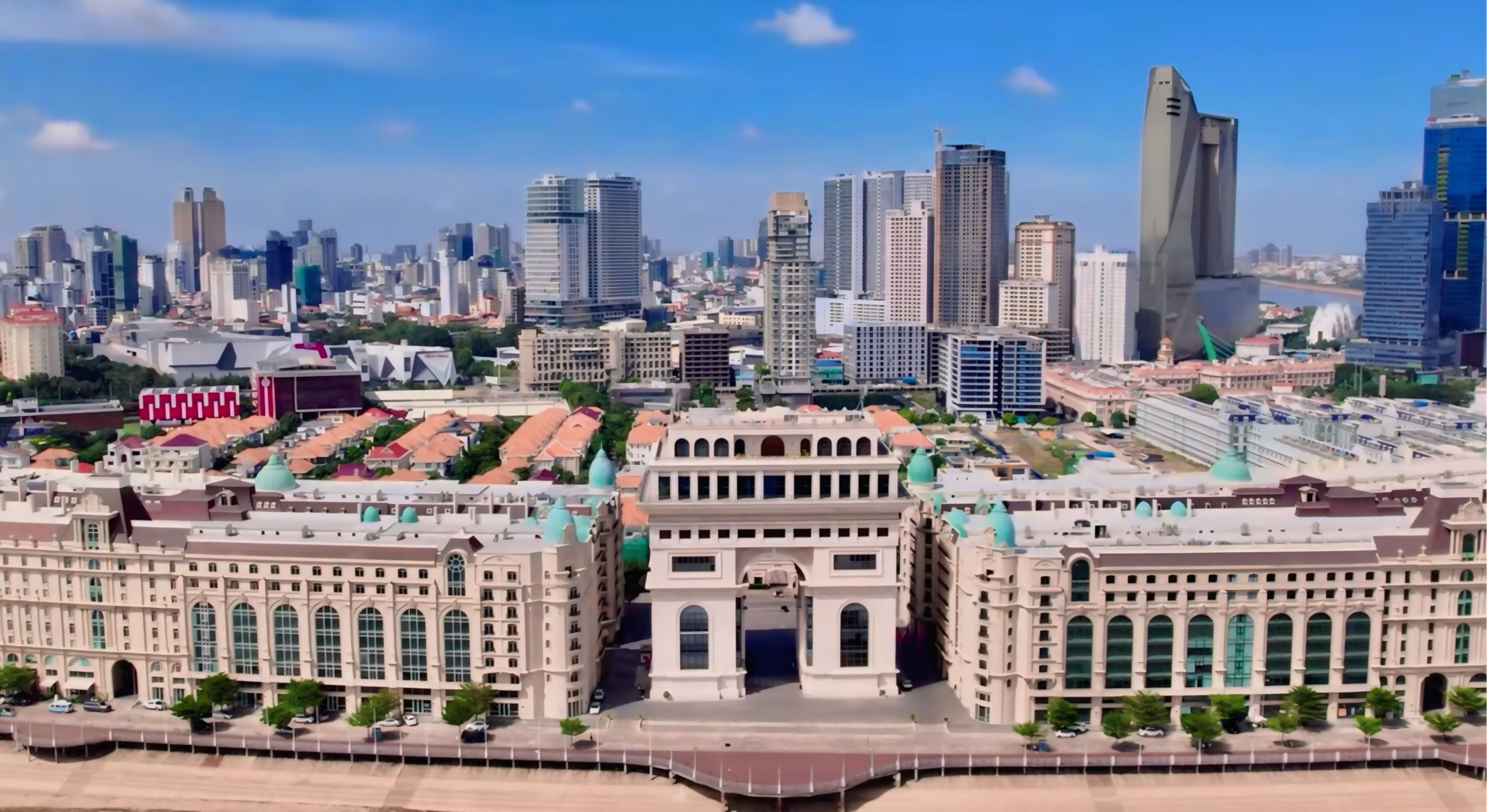
Koh Pich Skyline

Koh Pich (Diamond Island) has become one of Phnom Penh’s most developed and dynamic districts, a place where the city’s growth, lifestyle, and culture converge.

Redeveloped in 2006, Koh Pich has become a modern showcase of Cambodia’s evolving capabilities in urban development and large-scale infrastructure. Koh Pich is primarily master-planned by Overseas Cambodian Investment Corporation (OCIC) and they have spent over US$1.5 billion in developing Koh Pich's modern infrastructure.

Today, Koh Pich is home to more than 1,000 businesses, multiple international schools, a growing number of high-rise condominiums, and a rapidly expanding retail and lifestyle scene.

=== Koh Pich CBD ===
Numerous major multinational companies now operate in the district, including numerous Fortune 500 companies such as Unilever, Nestlé, DKSH, KPMG, Baker Tilly, Jotun, Legrand, AIA, Minebea, CMA CGM, Starbucks, and FoodPanda.

Complementing these global names, prominent local firms—such as Sok Siphana & Associates, AI Farm Robotics, KlapYaHandz, Orchid Hospital, and the Federation of Cambodian Startups—have also set up in Koh Pich, reinforcing its reputation as a business and innovation hub.

The area has also recently welcomed new retail entrants like BreadTalk, Koi Thé, and Kyō Shabu, further diversifying its lifestyle and entertainment offerings. These changes continue to attract businesses, residents, and visitors, solidifying Koh Pich’s role in Phnom Penh’s economic and social fabric.

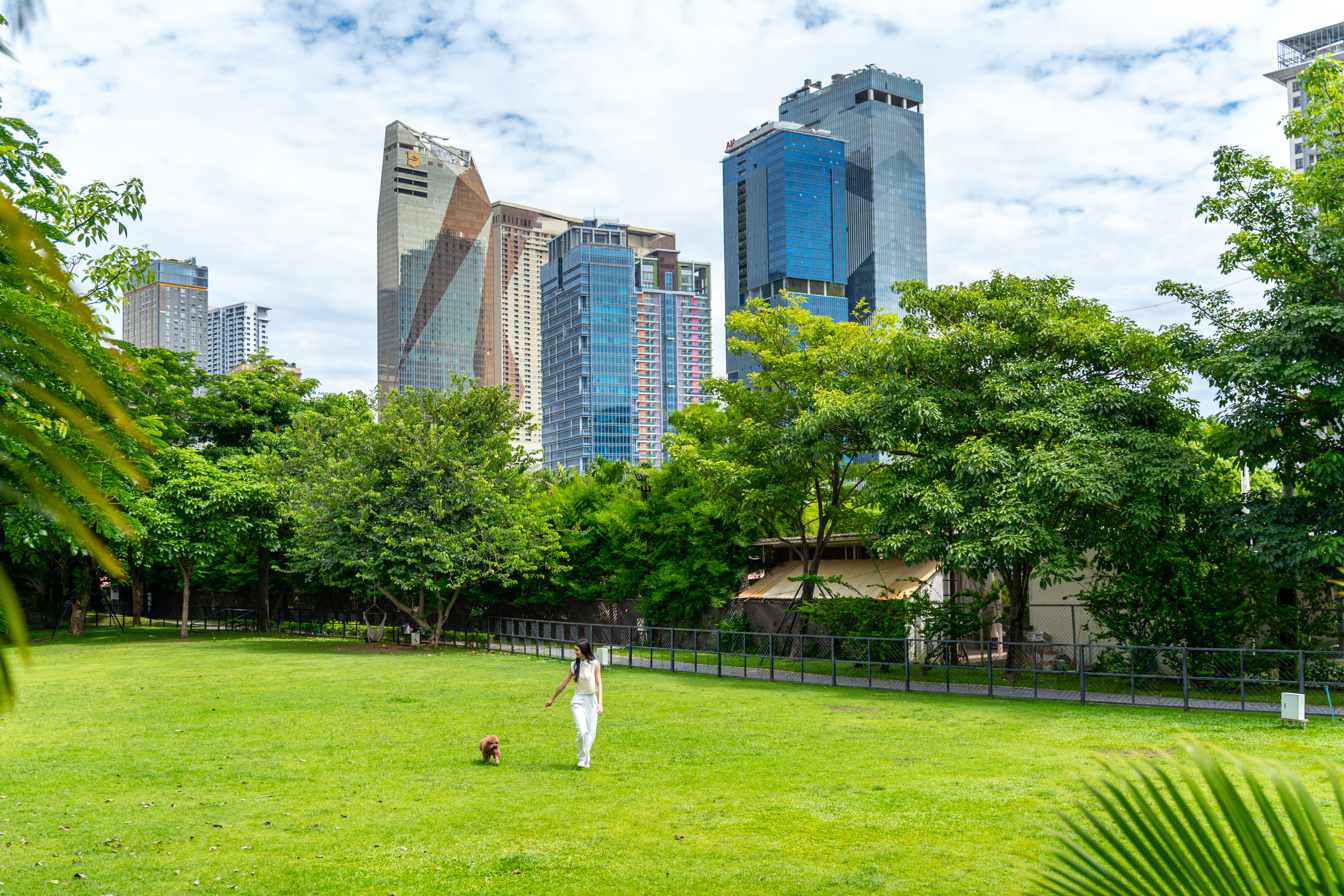
Koh Pich Central Park (Coconut Park)

=== Koh Pich Central Park ===
At the heart of Koh Pich lies the newly developed Koh Pich Central Park, a six-hectare green link by Overseas Cambodian Investment Corporation (OCIC) that connects the Swan Bridge with the landmark Koh Norea Bridge. Conceived as a people-centered, sustainable open space, the park embodies Phnom Penh’s ambition to integrate modern urban living with everyday community life.

Surrounding the park are Grade-A office towers—including GIA and Morgan Towers—alongside Connexion, Aquation, and upcoming premium residences such as Diamond Bay Garden. Collectively, this precinct supports more than 7,000 professionals and 15,000 residents, reinforcing its role as a vibrant living and business district.

=== Koh Pich Coconut Park ===
Coconut Park, set along the Bassac River, combines family-friendly attractions, sports facilities, dining options, creative hubs, and nightlife venues. It is quickly becoming a favorite destination for Cambodian families due to its lush green space and ammenities.

The park caters to diverse audiences: families enjoy its wide lawns, adventure playgrounds, splash zones, and creative workshops, while sports enthusiasts make use of the CIS Roller Dome—a modern indoor arena for roller skating, hockey, and community events.

The Mekong Zipline is a standout destination within Koh Pich. It offers panoramic views of Phnom Penh while ziplining across the Mekong River.

Its riverside restaurants and cafés create a lively daytime atmosphere, while evening entertainment transforms the park into one of Phnom Penh’s rising nightlife hotspots. This blend of daytime recreation and nighttime energy ensures steady visitor traffic and supports the district’s long-term commercial success.

Sports:

- Yoga Lawn
- Water Playground
- Mountain Biking Track
- Indoor Skate Park (Roller skating, Hockey, Ice Hockey, Synchronized Dance)
- Jet Ski
- Mekong Zipline

=== Koh Pich Treellion Park ===
Treellion Park, established in the late 1990s, was envisioned as a natural sanctuary where couples and young families could wander among statues celebrating love and wildlife.

Originally known as The Love Garden, it features at its heart a sculpture reminiscent of the Bayon temple’s four-faced towers, crafted by master sculptor Chantha ចន្ថា—renowned also for creating King Norodom Sihanouk’s statue at the Royal Palace. Master Chantha has also sculpted several unique statues within the park, drawing influence from Khmer culture.

Nestled near the river and away from the city’s bustling traffic, Treellion’s lush trees and shrubs provide a haven for rare bird species, making it a favored spot for bird watchers.

The Treellion Park is currently undergoing upgrading works as of August 2026 and is slated to re-open once complete.

=== Birdies Mini Golf ===
Launched in 2021, Phnom Penh’s first 18‑hole miniature golf course has quickly become a favorite spot for locals seeking both recreation and fitness in a lush, green setting. The mini-golf course is modelled after different worldwide locations such as African Safari, Holland Windmills and others for each hole.

The Birdies Mini Golf is currently temporarily closed for upgrading works as part of the Trellion Park project.

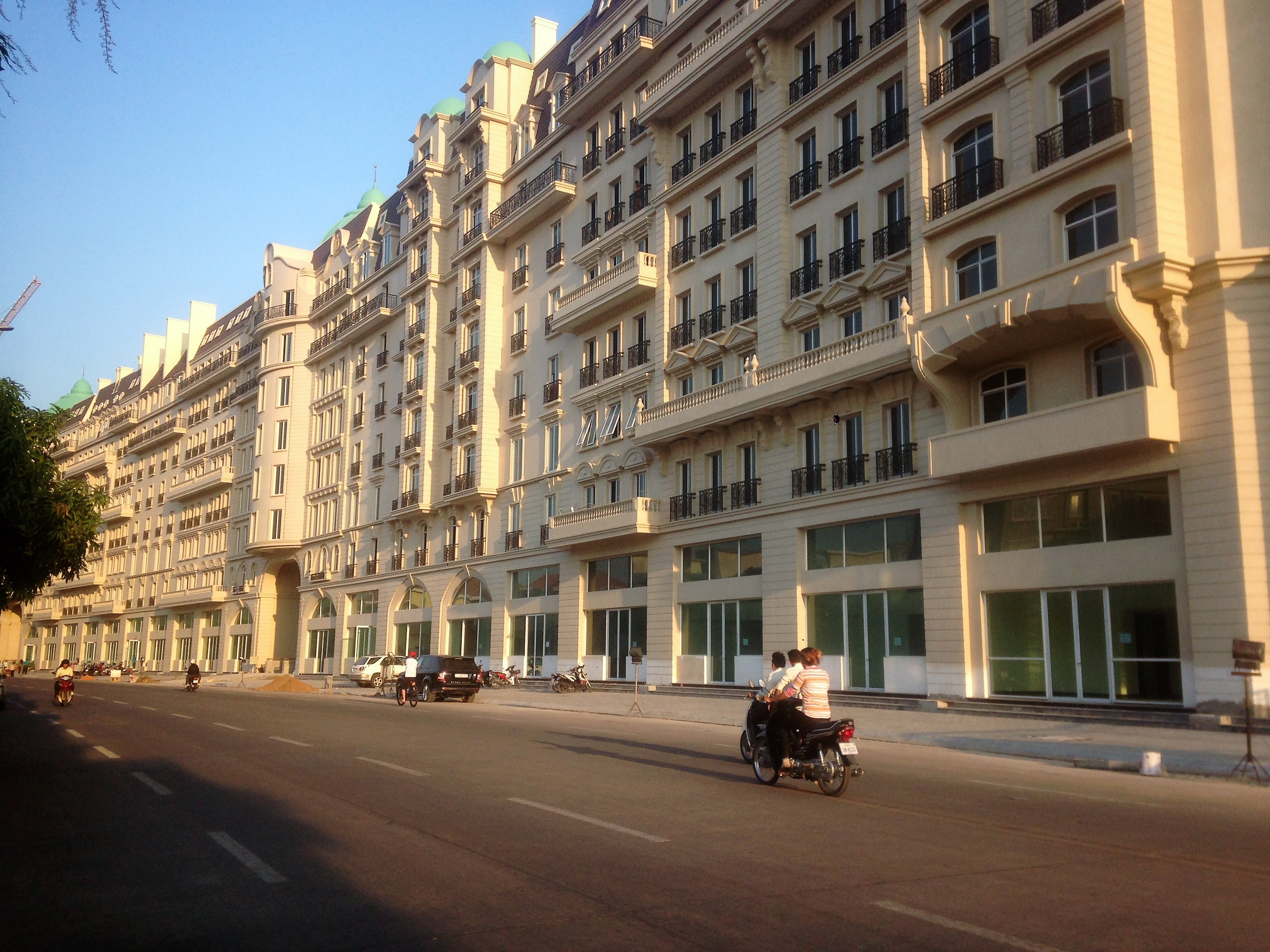
Koh Pich - The Elysee

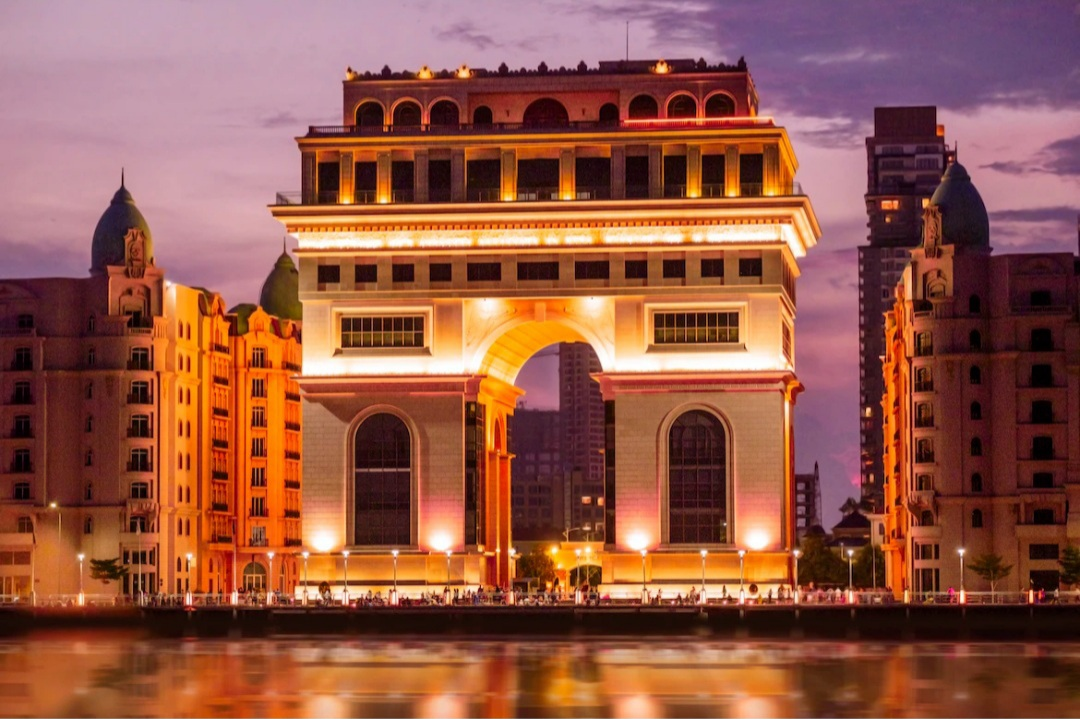
Koh Pich - The Elysee Nightview

=== Koh Pich - The Elysee ===
The Élysée on Koh Pich has emerged as a vibrant mix of health, leisure, and retail. Modelled after Paris, the street features French shophouses and buildings, wide boulevards, and an extended Bassac River walkway. The area combines regular riverside activity with lively events, making it a popular tourist destination. The area features popular up and coming cafes along the riverfront promenade.

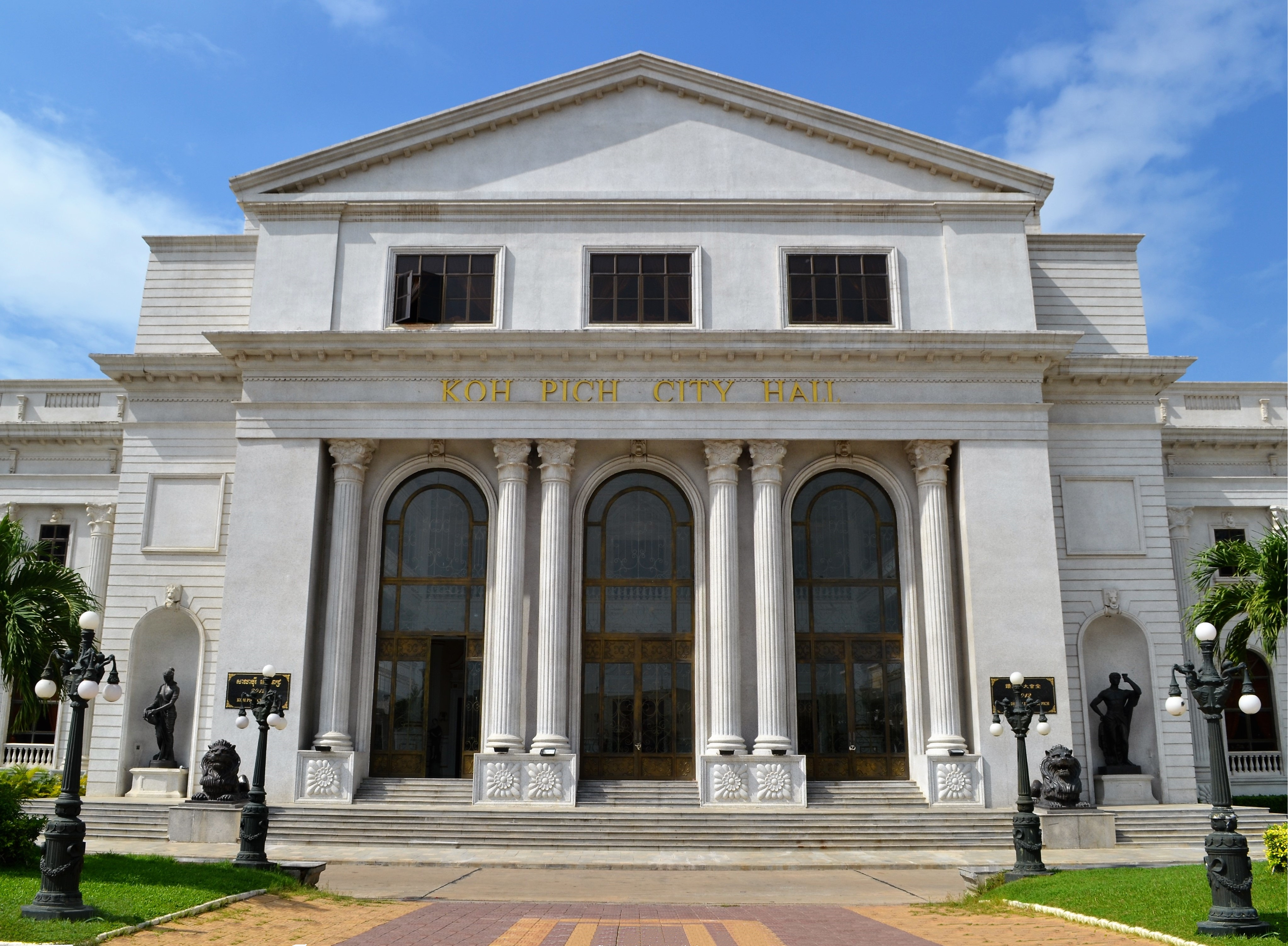
Koh Pich City Hall

Koh Pich City Hall - Interior

=== Koh Pich City Hall ===
Koh Pich City Hall is the latest addition to the island, it is a French neoclassical-inspired venue and covers over 2,800 square meters of indoor space. Serving both as an administrative center and a cultural icon, it has hosted major events, cultural exhibitions, concerts and conferences in recent years.

=== Koh Pich Theme Park ===
Koh Pich Theme Park is a mini-theme park targeting families and young children aged 4 to 12. It stands as one of the few traditional theme parks in Phnom Penh and offer fairground rides such as Ferris Wheel, Bumper Cars, Viking Ships and others at a reasonable rate.

Mekong Magic Cruise

=== Mekong Magic Cruise ===
The Mekong Magic Cruise, one of the newest vessels in Phnom Penh, departs daily from Koh Pich for a picturesque sunset excursion. The 90‑minute round trip crosses the Mekong, Tonle Sap and Four Faces Rivers, treating passengers to riverside scenes—stilt houses, fishing villages—alongside views of the Royal Palace and the new developments on Koh Pich (Diamond Island).

The cruise includes Khmer BBQ Buffet, Alcohol (beer and cocktails), and Tropical Fruits.

== Amenities ==
- Hospitals
  - Orchid Koh Pich Hospital
  - Orienda Chamkarmon Hospital
  - Khema International Polyclinic
- Hotels
  - The Bridge Club (4*)
  - Shangri-La, The Peak (5*)
  - Sofitel Phnom Penh (5*)
  - Anik Boutique Hotel (4*)
  - NagaWorld Integrated Resort (5*)
  - Steigenberger Hotel Phnom Penh (5*)
- Parks
  - Neak Banh Tuek Park
  - Wat Botum Park
  - Samdech Techo Hun Sen Park

== Embassies, United Nations and NGOs ==
Tonle Bassac is known as Phnom Penh's embassy zone with numerous countries and the United Nations basing their Cambodia operations in Tonle Bassac. Tonle Bassac is also particularly noted for its hub for ASEAN nations. With the exception of Timor Leste joining ASEAN in October 2025, all 9 other ASEAN nations have based their embassies in Tonle Bassac.

These countries include:

- ASEAN
  - Embassy of Singapore
  - Embassy of Brunei Darussalam
  - Royal Thai Embassy
  - Embassy of Vietnam
  - Embassy of Malaysia
  - Embassy of Indonesia
  - Embassy of Philippines
  - Embassy of Laos
  - Embassy of Myanmar
- Asia Pacific
  - Embassy of Japan
  - Embassy of Korea
  - Embassy of Australia
  - Embassy of Pakistan
  - Embassy of India
- Europe
  - Embassy of Germany
  - Embassy of Russia
  - Embassy of Turkey
  - Embassy of the Welsh
  - Embassy of Denmark
  - Embassy of the Czech Republic
  - Embassy of Bulgaria
- Middle East
  - Embassy of Kuwait
- United Nations
  - United Nations Development Programme (UNDP), Cambodia
  - United Nations Population Fund (UNFPA), Cambodia
  - Food and Agriculture Organization of the United Nations (FAO), Cambodia
  - United Nations Office for Project Services (UNOPS), Cambodia
  - Office Of The High Commissioner For Human Rights, Cambodia
- European Union
  - European Union in Cambodia Office

NGOs:

- Cambodian Center for Human Rights
- Cambodian League for the Promotion and Defense of Human Rights
- Teuksaat 1001 NGO Head Office
- CARE Cambodia
- Fauna & Flora International Cambodia

== Cambodia's National Assembly and Ministries ==
National Assembly of Cambodia

Tonle Bassac is home to Cambodia's National Assembly parliament and most Cambodian Ministries.

The full list can be found here:

- National Assembly
- Supreme National Economic Council
- Ministry of Foreign Affairs and International Cooperation
- Ministry of Interior
- Ministry of Planning
- Ministry of Environment
- Ministry of Culture and Fine Arts
- Ministry of Inspection
- Ministry of Agriculture, Forestry and Fisheries
- Ministry of Water Resources and Meteorology
- Ministry of Rural Development
- Ministry of Social Affairs, Veterans and Youth Rehabilitation

Other National Agencies:

- General Commissariat of the National Police
- Cambodia Living Arts

== Education ==
=== Universities ===
- Public Universities
  - Royal University Of Law And Economics
  - Phnom Penh University of the Arts
  - Royal School of Administration of Cambodia
  - Preah Sihamoniraja Buddhist University
- International Universities
  - Raffles International School
  - De Montfort University (First British University in Cambodia)
  - Paññāsāstra University of Cambodia

=== International Schools ===
- iCAN British International School – British curriculum for ages 2–11, located on Ke Nou Street in Tonle Bassac
- Canadian International School of Phnom Penh (CIS) – IB World School on Koh Pich offering Nursery to Grade 12, with a preschool campus in Bassac Garden City
- École Française Internationale (EFI) – French curriculum, preschool through middle school, also located on Koh Pich
