= Khan Boeng Keng Kang =

Section in Phnom Penh, Cambodia

Boeng Keng Kang ខណ្ឌបឹងកេងកង
- Section
- Location of Boeng Keng Kang within Phnom Penh

- Location within Cambodia
- Coordinates: 11°32′53″N 104°54′56″E
- Country: Cambodia
- Province: Phnom Penh

Area
  - Total: 4.1 km^{2} (1.6 sq mi)

Population (2019)
  - Total: 66,658
- Time zone: UTC+07:00 (ICT)
- Geocode: 1206

Boeng Keng Kang (Khmer: បឹងកេងកង [ɓəŋ keːŋkɑːŋ]) is a section (khan) in Phnom Penh, Cambodia. This khan was created on January 8, 2019, according to sub-decree 03 អនក្រ.បក by taking 7 quarters (sangkat) from Chamkar Mon Section. It has a population of 66,658.

== Administration ==
As of 2019, Boeng Keng Kang has 7 quarters (sangkat) and 55 villages (phum).

No.	Code	Quarter	Khmer	Villages
1	121301	Boeung Keng Kang I	បឹងកេងកងទី១	9
2	121302	Boeng Keng Kang II	បឹងកេងកងទី២	9
3	121303	Boeng Keng Kang III	បឹងកេងកងទី៣	9
4	121304	Olympic	អូឡាំពិក	5
5	121305	Tumnob Tuek	ទំនប់ទឹក	5
6	121306	Tuol Svay Prey I	ទួលស្វាយព្រៃទី១	7
7	121307	Tuol Svay Prey II	ទួលស្វាយព្រៃទី២	11
Total				55

== Education ==
Harrods International Academy has two campuses in Boeung Keng Kang I: the main campus and the early years campus.
