= Khan Chamkar Mon =

Chamkar Mon ខណ្ឌចំការមន
- District (Khan)
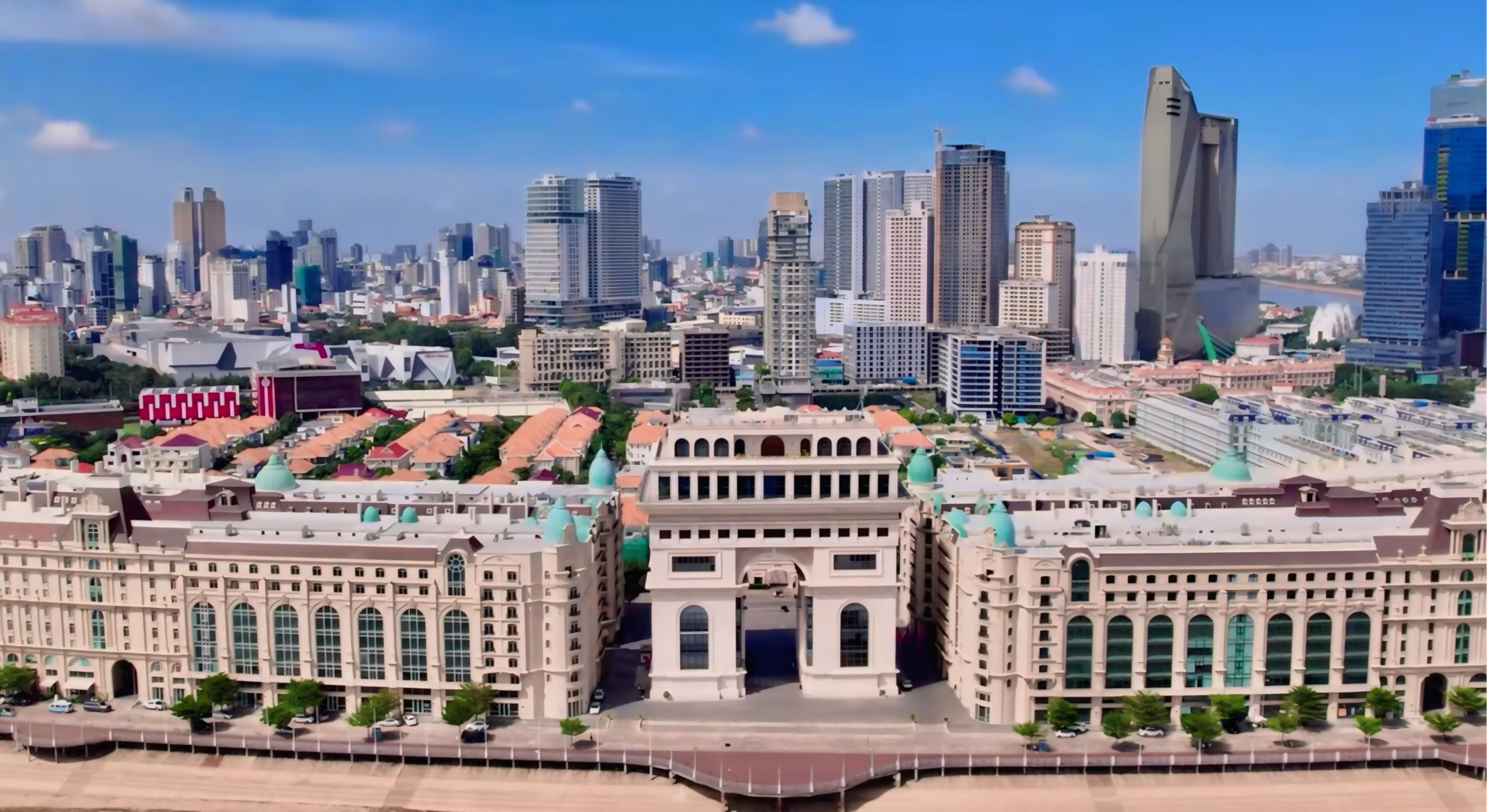
- Skyline of Koh Pich looking towards Chamkar Mon District

- Location of Chamkar Mon within Phnom Penh
- Coordinates: 11°32′36.246″N 104°55′26.793″E
- Country: Cambodia
- Province: Phnom Penh

Area
  - Total: 6.9 km^{2} (2.7 sq mi)

Population (2019)
  - Total: 70,772 ▼
  - Density: 10,000/km^{2} (27,000/sq mi)
- Time zone: UTC+7 (ICT)
- Postal code: 12300

Chamkar Mon (Khmer: ចំការមន, meaning 'Mulberry Farm') is the southernmost district in central Phnom Penh, Cambodia. The district has an area of 10.56 km^{2}. As of the 2019 census, its population was 70,772.

== Administration ==
Chamkar Mon was subdivided into 12 Sangkats and 95 Phums (villages).

No.	Postal Code	Sangkat (commune)	Phums (villages)
1	12301	Tonle Bassac	Phum1–Phum16
2	12302	Boeung Keng Kang I	Phum1–Phum9
3	12303	Boeung Keng Kang II	Phum1–Phum9
4	12304	Boeung Keng Kang III	Phum1–Phum9
5	12305	Boeung Trobaek	Phum1–Phum8
6	12306	Tumnob Teuk	Phum1–Phum5
7	12307	Phsar Daem Thkov	Phum1–Phum7
8	12308	Tuol Svay Prey I	Phum1–Phum7
9	12309	Tuol Svay Prey II	Phum1–Phum11
10	12310	Tuol Tompoung I	Phum1–Phum5
11	12311	Tuol Tompoung II	Phum1–Phum4
12	12312	Olympic	Phum1–Phum5

On January 8, 2019, according to sub-decree 03 អនក្រ.បក, 7 sangkats from Khan Chamkar Mon have been moved to a new khan, Khan Boeng Keng Kang.

No.	Code	Sangkat	Khmer	Number of Phum/Villages
1	120101	Tonle Basak	សង្កាត់ទន្លេបាសាក់	16
2	120109	Tuol Tumpung II	សង្កាត់ទួលទំពូងទី ២	4
3	120110	Tuol Tumpung I	សង្កាត់ទួលទំពូងទី ១	5
4	120111	Boeng Trabaek	សង្កាត់បឹងត្របែក	8
5	120112	Phsar Daeum Thkov	សង្កាត់ផ្សារដើមថ្កូវ	7
Total				40

== Education ==
The Canadian International School of Phnom Penh maintains its main campus on Koh Pich in Chamkar Mon Section and the Bassac Garden Preschool in the Chamkar Mon Section.

iCan British International School is in Tonle Bassac commune.

DK SchoolHouse is in the embassy district of Phnom Penh.

== Gallery ==
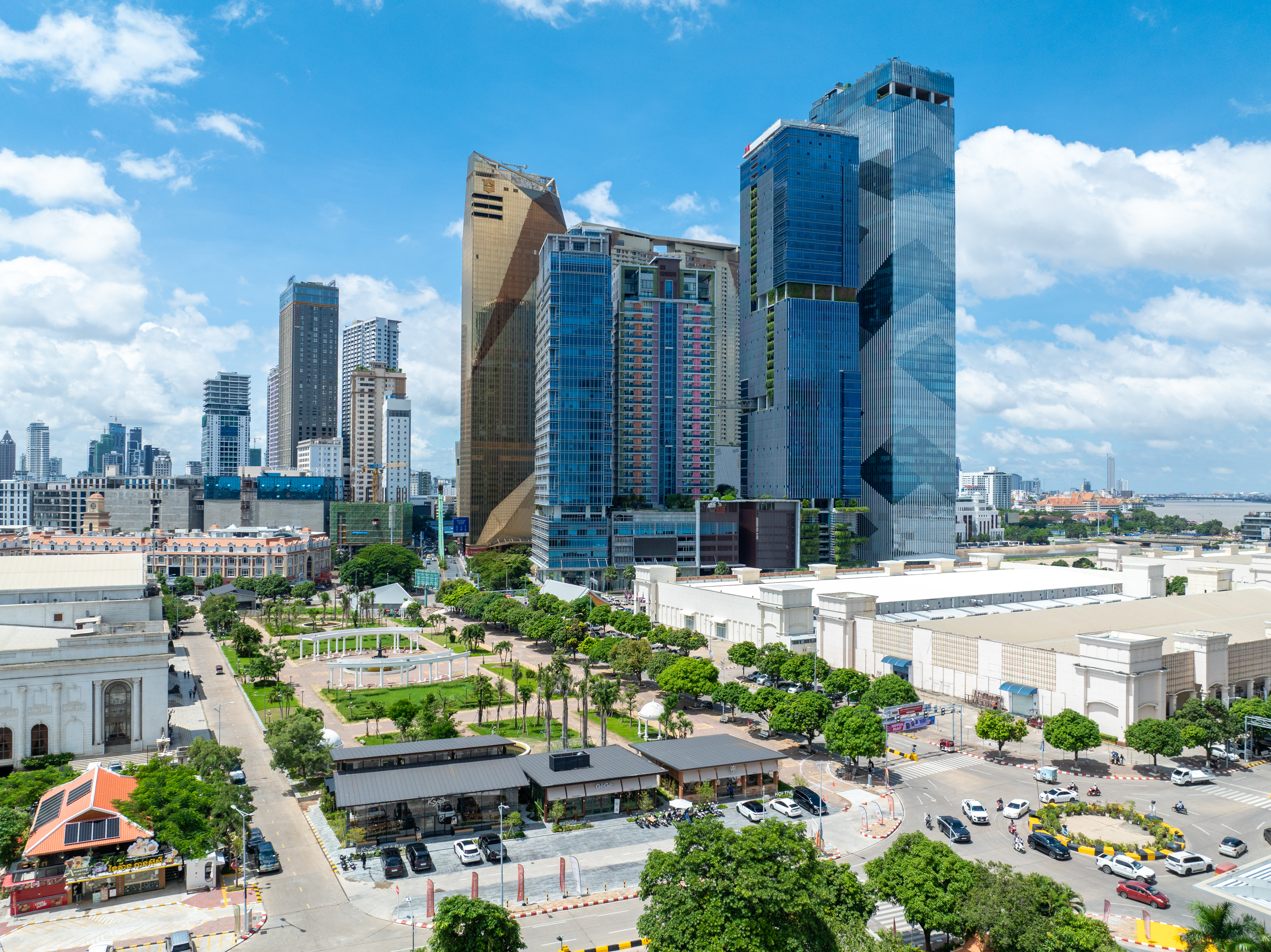
Koh Pich Central Business District

National Assembly Palace of Cambodia

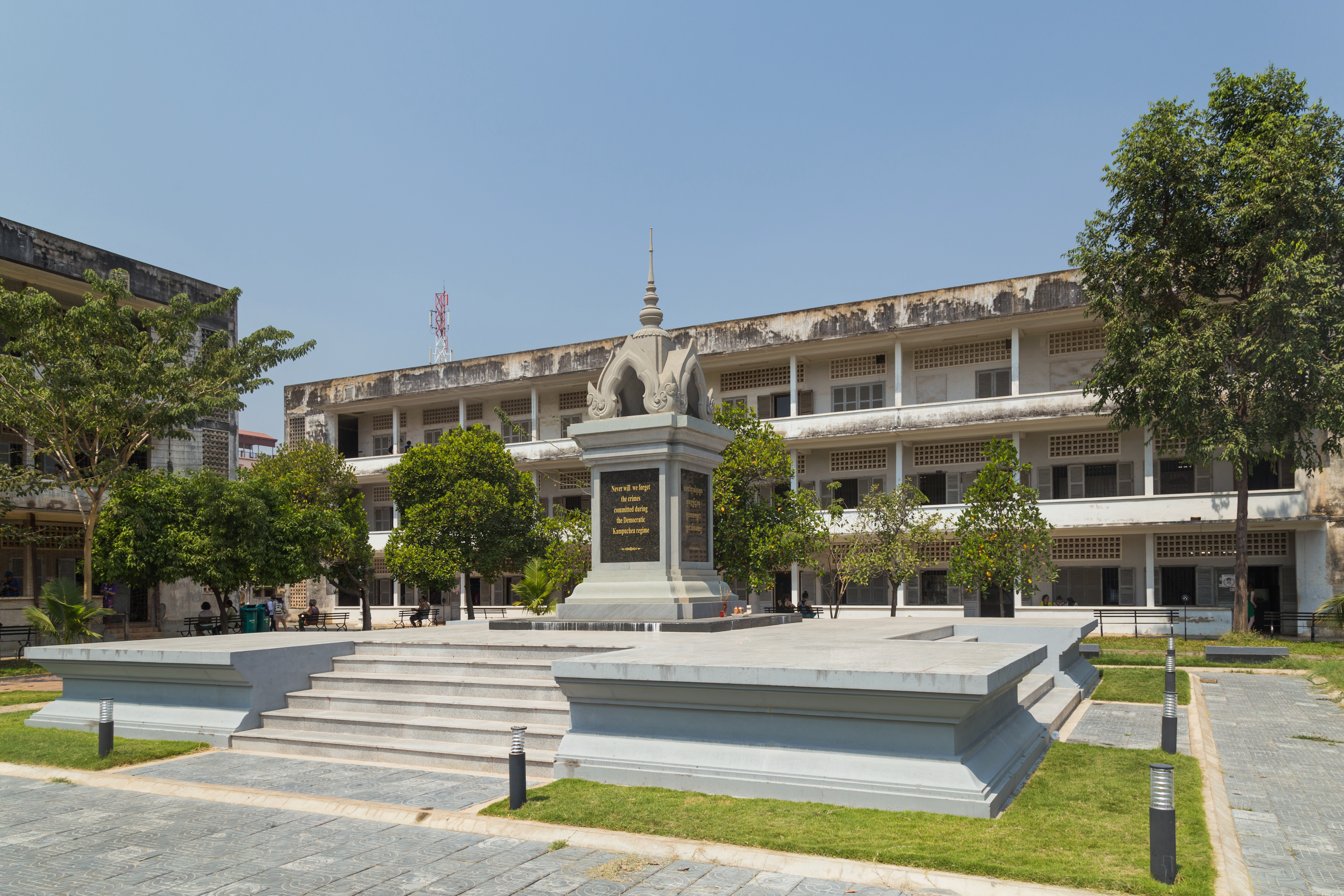
Tuol Sleng Genocide Museum
