= The Cambodia China Times =

News website in Cambodia

- Type: News website
- Owner: Cambodia China Media Group
- Founder: Ruan Zhiqiang
- Founded: February 5, 2018; 8 years ago
- Language: Chinese and Khmer
- Headquarters: 126E1, Charles de Gaulle Boulevard, Phnom Penh
- Country: Cambodia
- Website: cc-times.com

Chinese name
- Simplified Chinese: 柬中时报
- Traditional Chinese: 柬中時報
Transcriptions
Standard Mandarin
- Hanyu Pinyin: Jiǎnzhòng Shíbào

The Cambodia China Times is a news website in Cambodia, founded by Ruan Zhiqiang on 5 February 2018. Initially, it only provided Chinese language reports, but began offering Khmer language reports in 2020.

== History ==
The Cambodia China Times was a news media established by Cambodian Chinese Ruan Zhiqiang in January 2018. The news website was launched on 5 February 2018 and obtained a news website business license from the Cambodian Ministry of Information on 8 February 2018. It is the first new media established by Chinese Cambodians in Cambodia. The Cambodia China Times is aimed at the Cambodian Chinese community, focusing on the local Chinese community and Chinese language education, as well as China- Cambodia relations. In the early days, it only provided Chinese reports. On 26 July 2018, it launched a mobile application on Android and iOS platforms. On 2 September 2018, The Cambodia China Times cooperated with ASEAN Headlines News Agency to release articles to the international community through the news agency.

In February 2019, Pung Kheav Se's Canadia Group invested in The Cambodia China Times. On 18 November 2019, Pung Kheav Se’s The Commercial News and The Cambodia China Times merged to form the Cambodia China Media Group, with Ruan Zhiqiang serving as the group’s general manager. On 1 February 2020, a Khmer language branch was added. On 9 September 2020, the Android and iOS mobile applications for the Khmer language branch were launched. In mid-September, the mobile application was launched on the Huawei AppGallery. In July 2022, The Cambodia China Times established a branch in Preah Sihanouk province.
