= Canadia Bank =

Bank in Cambodia

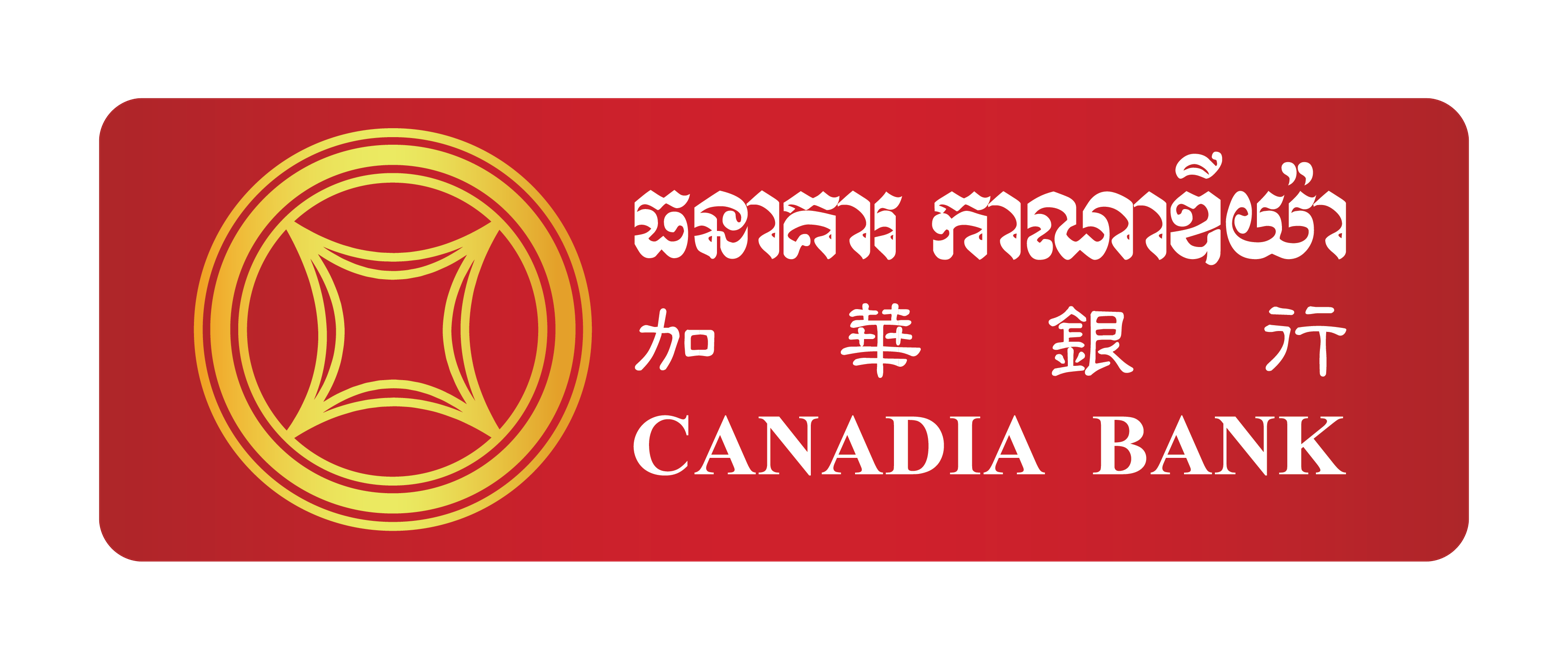

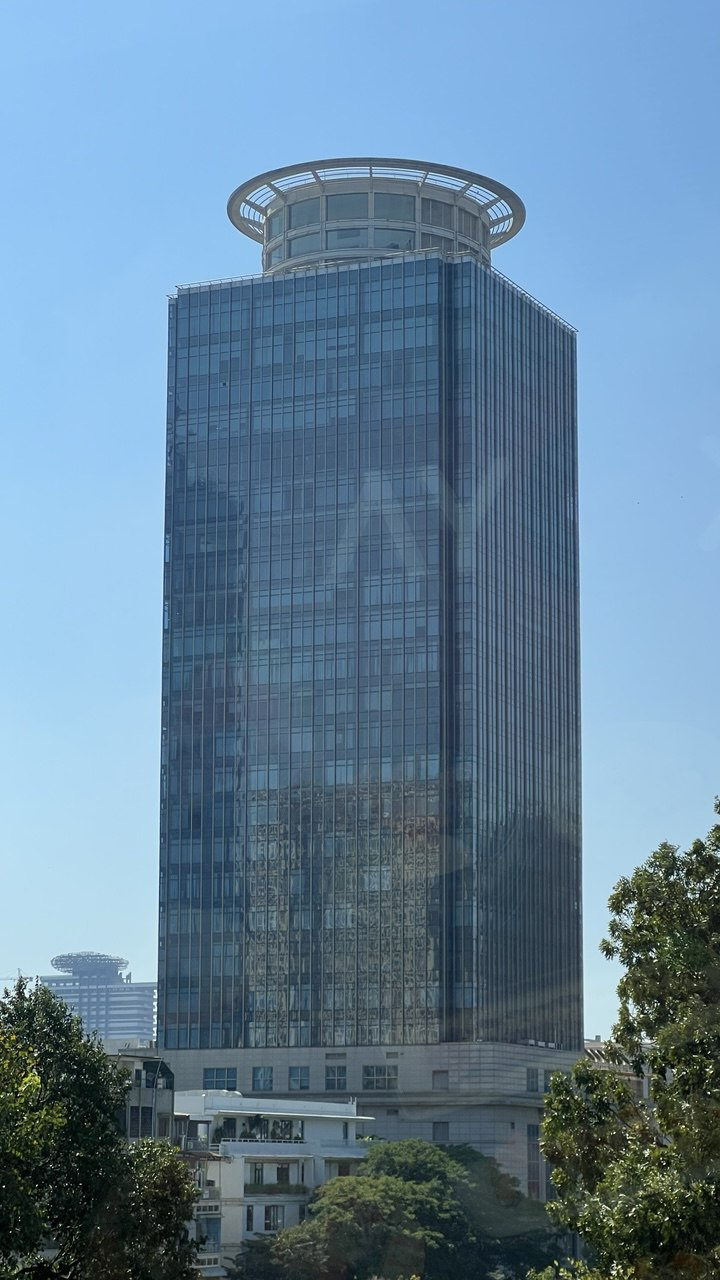
- Canadia Bank headquarters in Phnom Penh
- Native name: ធនាគារ កាណាឌីយ៉ា
- Company type: Private
- Industry: Banking and finance
- Founded: 11 November 1991; 34 years ago (as Canadia Gold & Trust Co., Ltd.)
- Founder: Pung Kheav Se (Chairman of the Board of Directors)
- Headquarters: Phnom Penh, Cambodia
- Number of locations: 72 branches (69 in Cambodia, 3 in Laos)
- Area served: Cambodia and Laos
- Key people: Dominic Mario Notario (CEO)
- Products: Financial services
- Revenue: ▲US$517 million (2024)
- Net income: ▼US$78 million (2024)
- Total assets: ▲US$8.622 billion (2024)
- Number of employees: 4,000+ (2025)
- Parent: Canadia Group (Canadia Investment Holding Plc.)
- Subsidiaries: Canadia Bank Lao; Canadia Securities
- Website: www.canadiabank.com.kh

Canadia Bank (Khmer: ធនាគារ កាណាឌីយ៉ា; Chinese: 加華銀行) is one of the largest local banks in Cambodia. The bank was established in 1991 and became privatized in 1998. It operates 69 branches across 25 provinces and the capital. Canadia Bank is one of Cambodia's Big Three banks, and is Cambodia's largest locally owned banking institution.

As of 2024, Canadia Bank has total assets of US$8.6 billion and Revenue of US$517 million, with net profit of US$78 million.

== History ==
Canadia Bank was established on 11 November 1991, as Canadia Gold & Trust Corporation Limited, under a joint-venture with overseas Cambodians and the National Bank of Cambodia. It was founded by Pung Kheav Se, a Cambodian businessman who serves as the bank's chairman of the board. The main activities were based on gold refining and issuance, banking services, and credit to local merchants.

On 19 April 1993, the institution was renamed "Canadia Bank Ltd.", and subsequently became "Canadia Bank Plc." on 16 December 2003, as a commercial bank registered under the Ministry of Commerce and the National Bank of Cambodia. Following its privatization in 1998, the bank expanded its operation within Cambodia. The bank operates branches across Cambodia and maintains relationships with 23 international correspondent banks.

As a subsidiary of Canadia Investment Holding, the bank is a member of Canadia Group, a diversified conglomerate which includes several well-known Cambodian companies, including Overseas Cambodian Investment Corporation (OCIC) which are the main developer and investor of Techo International Airport, Chroy Changvar Bay, Koh Pich, Norea City, and other projects within Cambodia.

Canadia Bank's SWIFT code is "CADIKHPP" or "CADIKHPPXXX".

== Milestones ==
- 11 November 1991 - Canadia Bank is established under the name "Canadia Gold and Trust Corporation Limited"
- 19 April 1993 - The name of the then corporation is changed to "Canadia Bank Ltd."
- 16 December 2003 - The name is changed from "Canadia Bank Ltd." to "Canadia Bank Plc."
- 2009 - Opening of Canadia Bank's new headquarters at Canadia Tower
- 2013 - Mobile Banking & Internet Banking launched
- 2018 - Total assets reached US$5 billion USD
- 2019 - Most profitable year on record with net earning exceeding US$122 million USD
- 11 November 2021 - Canadia Bank celebrates 30th year in Cambodia's market
- 5 February 2023 - Canadia Bank announces official launch of All-New Canadia Bank App for Mobiles
- 28 April 2025 – Recognized as Best Retail Bank in Cambodia by The Asian Banker for the fifth time

== See also ==
- List of Cambodia-related topics
- List of Banks in Cambodia

== Notes ==
- Canadia Bank Plc. "OCIC Annual Report 2005" (PDF). Archived from the original (PDF) on 27 September 2007.
- Sorya Shopping Center. "Partners". Archived from the original on 14 July 2007.
- Se, Pung Kheav. "Canadia Bank Plc.: Overseas Cambodian Investment Corp. (OCIC) Founder's Speech". Archived from the original on 27 September 2007.
- Xinhuanet, Cambodia Online. "Cambodia's Canadia Bank signs finance agreements with IFC, USAID". Archived from the original on 27 September 2007.
- "Canadia Bank opened office in Shanghai..." (Press release). Cambodia Commercial Bank (CCB). 11 January 2006. Archived from the original on 30 October 2006.
- "International Finance Corp granted Canadia Bank US$5 million in loans..." (Press release). Cambodia Commercial Bank (CCB). 10 November 2004. Archived from the original on 30 October 2006.
- "Canadia Bank will construct a USD15 million..." (Press release). Cambodia Commercial Bank (CCB). 3 August 2004. Archived from the original on 30 October 2006.*
