= Thierry Tea =

French-Cambodian businessman and investor

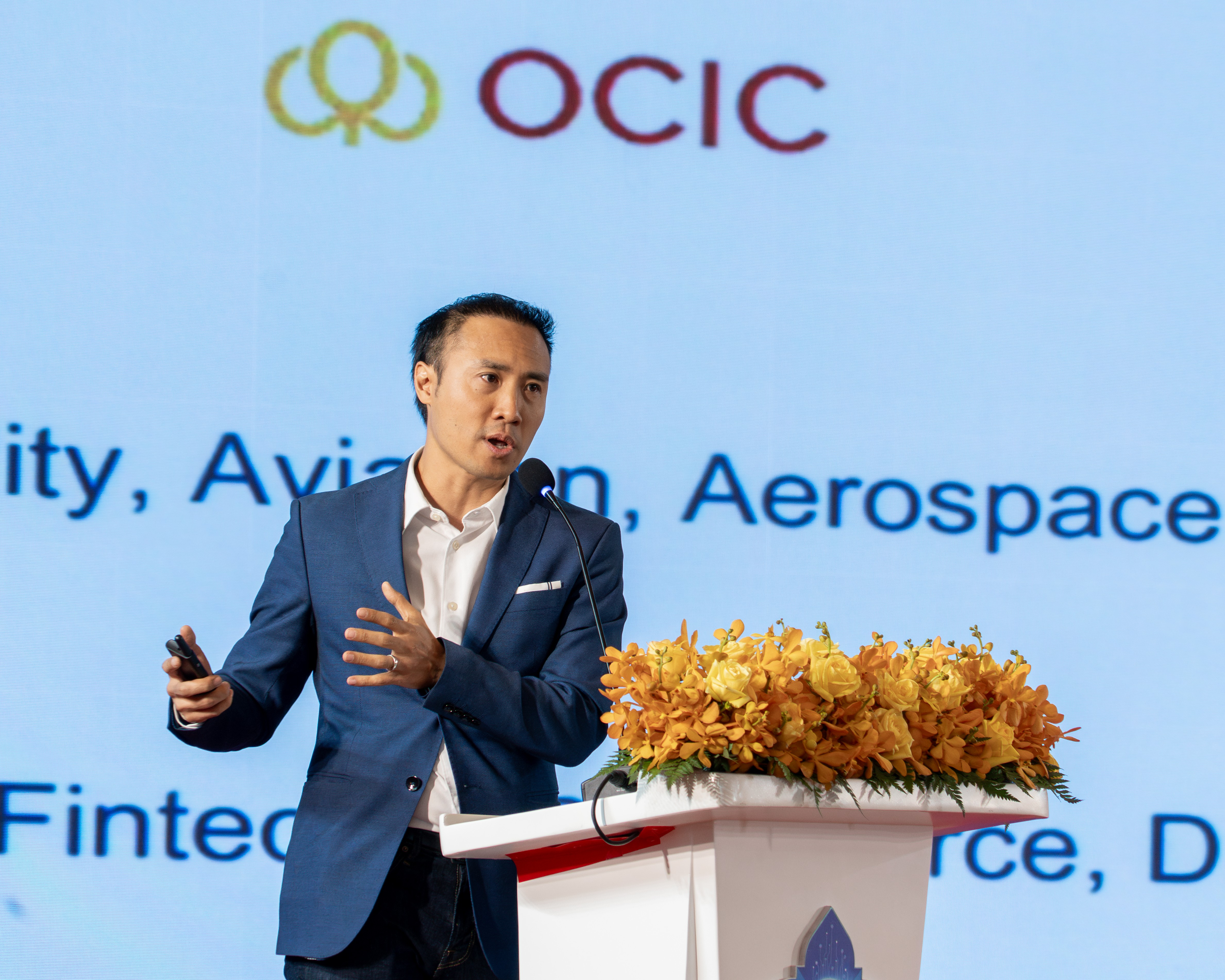
- Tea in 2025
- Born: 22 April 1981 (age 45); Paris, France
- Education: Harvard Business School; INSEAD; Drexel University
- Occupations: Entrepreneur, executive, investor
- Years active: 2003–present
- Title: Vice President of OCIC; Founder and CEO of PhilJets Group; Founder and CEO of Canadia Impact Fund Co. (CIFC)
- Board member of: Negocia Capital; Dara Ventures
- Spouse: Lynda Him
- Children: 3

Thierry Tea (born 22 April 1981) is a French-Cambodian entrepreneur and investor. He is the founder and CEO of PhilJets Group, a business aviation company based in the Philippines, and serves as Vice President of Cambodian family-owned conglomerate Overseas Cambodian Investment Corporation (OCIC). Tea has also been involved in initiatives across aviation, fintech, urban development, and private equity.

== Early life and education ==
Tea was born in Paris, France, to Cambodian parents of Teochew descent who resettled as refugees during the Cambodian Civil War. He grew up in Paris' Quartier Asiatique and pursued business studies in Singapore, later participating in an exchange program at Drexel University in the United States. He completed the Owner/President Management Program at Harvard Business School between 2020 and 2022 and undertook executive education programs at INSEAD Business School.

== Career ==
=== Airbus Philippines and Eurocopter ===
Tea began his career with Airbus Helicopters in Paris and later transferred to Singapore through the VIE program. In 2004, he joined Eurocopter Philippines and was named President and CEO in 2007, becoming one of the youngest executives in the Airbus network. He later served as Head of Airbus Group Philippines, overseeing major contracts including a $7 billion order by Philippine Airlines.

=== PhilJets Group ===
In 2013, Tea founded PhilJets Group, offering aviation services such as MRO, charter flights, and aircraft management. PhilJets acquired Zenith Air and gained AMO certification from the Civil Aviation Authority of the Philippines. The company briefly partnered with Grab to launch GrabHeli, an air taxi service in Manila. In 2017, the group has added a Bell 407GX helicopter to its fleets, marking its eighth aircraft and the first of its type available for charter in the Philippines. After the addition of Bell 407GX, The company ordered three Bell 505 helicopters through its parent company Starline Global Industries, adding to its fleet alongside an existing Bell 407GX as part of its fleet expansion in the Philippines and the Asia Pacific region.

=== Overseas Cambodian Investment Corporation ===
Since 2023, Tea has served as Vice President of Overseas Cambodian Investment Corporation (OCIC) in Cambodia. He works alongside the group’s executive leadership in advancing projects related to real estate, smart cities, public infrastructure, and innovation ecosystems. His work includes efforts to expand the reach of OCIC’s flagship developments such as Koh Pich, and overseeing collaboration with regional and international partners.

=== Other initiatives ===
Tea co-founded WeCube Inc., a digital startup ecosystem, and serves as Ambassador for La French Tech Philippines. He also leads Dara Ventures, which holds Cambodia’s franchise rights for brands such as Pandora and Bering. In addition, he launched Negocia Capital Investments to support private equity, trading, and advisory services.

== Awards and recognition ==
- 2009 – Appointed Foreign Trade Advisor (CCE) for France.
- 2010 – Named one of "People of the Year" by People Asia magazine for emergency aviation support during Typhoon Ondoy.
- 2025 – Featured in Cambodia Investment Review's Top 50 Leaders list.

== Personal life ==
Tea is married to Lynda Him, a French-Cambodian entrepreneur involved in rice trading. The couple has three children. Tea speaks French, English, Khmer, and Teochew.

== See also ==
- Airbus Helicopters
- Koh Pich
- Overseas Cambodian Investment Corporation
