= Independence Hotel =

Hotel in Cambodia

Independence Hotel by Dara
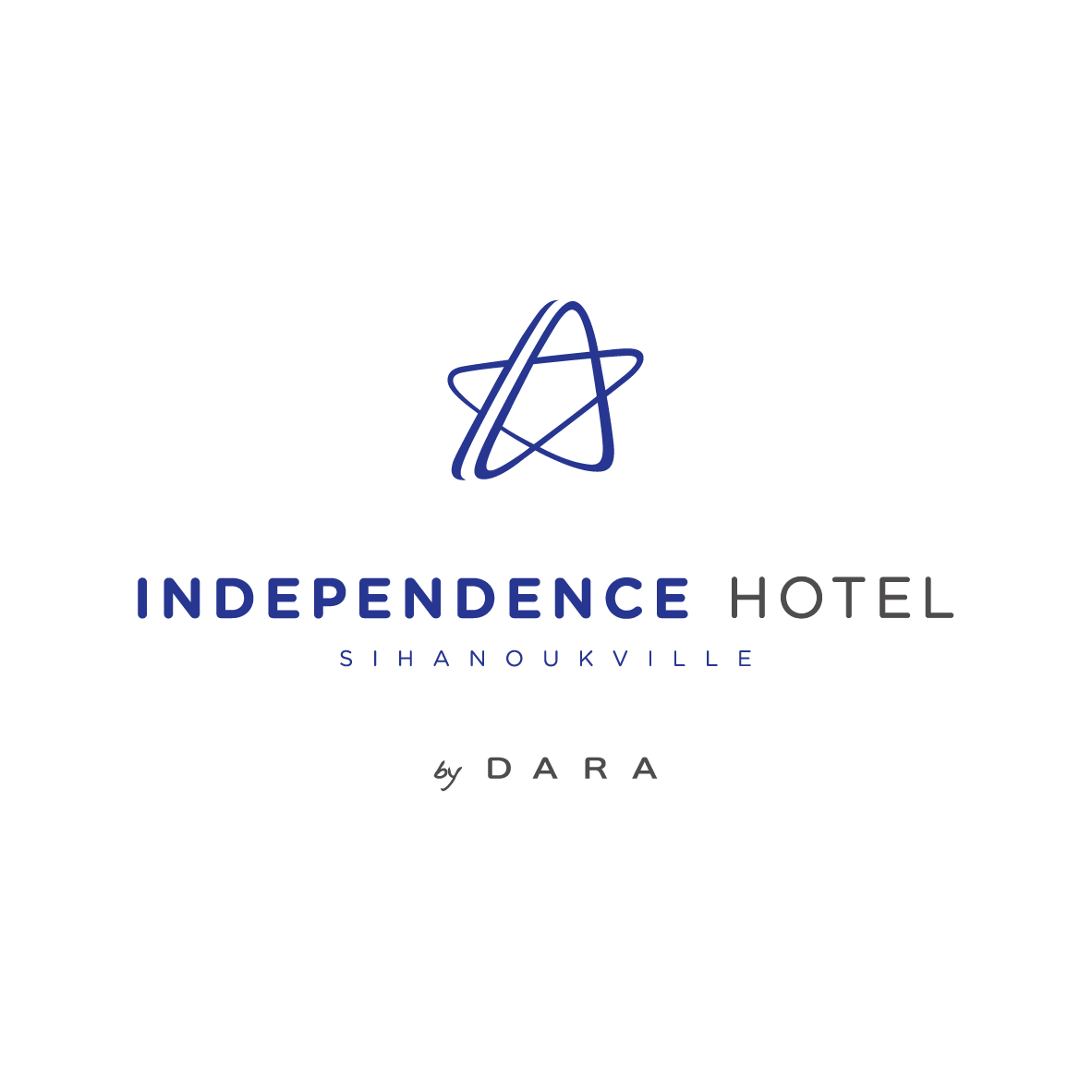

- Independence Hotel by Dara in 2010
- Interactive map of the Independence Hotel by Dara area

General information
- Location: Sihanoukville, Cambodia
- Coordinates: 10°37′03″N 103°29′42″E
- Opening: 1964; 62 years ago
- Owner: Overseas Cambodian Investment Corporation
- Management: Dara Hotels Group

Technical details
- Floor count: 7

Website
- Official Website

Independence Hotel by Dara, is a hotel in Cambodia. It is located 5km outside of Sihanoukville's city center. The hotel is part of the Dara Hotels Group chain based in Phnom Penh and a subsidiary of Overseas Cambodian Investment Corporation.

== History ==
The original hotel, completed in 1964, was designed by French architect duo Leroy and Mondet as a conscious landmark to demonstrate the country's optimism following independence from France. A large white edifice perched above the sea, the building was known locally as bprahm-bpel jawn, or "seven storeys", as it was by far the tallest in the country. During this time the hotel's guests included Catherine Deneuve and Jacqueline Kennedy, and the hotel served as a "show piece" for the Royal Family, with King Norodom Sihanouk taking responsibility for the hotel's original interior design.

The hotel fell into disuse as a hotel under the Khmer Rouge, who used it both for target practice and as a base for overseeing the port town of Sihanoukville, camping out in its empty corridors. Dissidents were also reportedly imprisoned in the clover-leaf shaped pool, which was roofed over with bamboo to form a rudimentary gaol.

Following the fall of Pol Pot, the hotel reopened in 1992 to house UNTAC forces who were seeking to assist in rebuilding the country, although it is said only half of the rooms were habitable. It later again fell into disuse, and was used as a hide-out for criminals and smugglers.

Independence Hotel was finally refurbished and then reopened as a three-star luxury hotel in 2007, following investment by Canadia Group. The Cambodia Daily reported, prior to the opening, that "Revamped, refurbished, its grisly memories buried under a new coat of paint, the historic building will once again represent a nation’s optimism."
