= Anvaya (organization) =

Cambodian Khmer organization

Anvaya is a Khmer association established in 2010 with a self-described mission to "bring together and support the returning movement of scattered Cambodians from overseas". Anvaya is an independent, non-political, non-profit organization. It is an active organization within Cambodia and in countries with a Cambodian population that has been scattered.

Anvaya has over 300 registered members, collectively called “Anvayiste” or "Diaspora", across the world.

== Origin of name and emblem ==
The name Anvaya (in Khmer script: អន្វយៈ) comes from the Sanskrit language and means family or lineage. The Anvaya's emblem is a set of three lotus flowers, each symbolizing one of the continents of the Diaspora (Europe, America, or Oceania) which together represent Cambodia.

== Creation ==
Anvaya was created in 2010 by Soreasmey Ke Bin, a French-Cambodian, and David Yim, a Cambodian-American. Upon returning to Cambodia in the early 2000s, they observed that Cambodians that wished to return to their roots had no kind of support system to help them. They then launched Anvaya as a free social network to gather people looking to return to their roots at regular events.

In 2013, Anvaya became a fully legal registered association established by Soreasmey Ke Bin, its founding president.

In 2013, Anvaya was legally registered as an association by its president, Soreasmey Ke Bin.

== Organization ==
Anvaya is managed by a steering committee of six directors, each of which are elected by 30 members of the permanent council of the association with a two-year mandate. As of August 2016, the president of the association is one of the original co-founders, Soreasmey Ke Bin.

== Mission ==
The main goal of Anvaya is to "ease the return of the Cambodian diaspora". Anvaya's four key objectives are to:

- Foster a sense of community among returnees through this social and professional network;
- Encourage and support overseas Cambodians in their effort to return;
- Inform overseas Cambodian about business, social and employment opportunities in Cambodia;
- Develop opportunities for overseas Cambodians to return, especially young professionals.

Anvaya aspires to catalyze and facilitate the rebirth of Cambodia through the collaboration and support of partners in the private sector, international institutions and government.

== Members ==
All the members of Anvaya originate from Cambodia and have lived among the Cambodian diaspora communities. They may be in Cambodia or overseas.

In March 2015, Anvaya had 300 members. Since the beginning of its official registration, Anvaya has counted on the support and the membership of leading characters of the Diaspora, such as the Cambodian society. Current prominent members include:

- Two Cambodian government ministers: Sun Chanthol, Minister of trade; and Dr. Ing Khantha Phavi, Minister of Women
- French-Cambodian film directors and producers, Rithy Panh, Davy Chou, and Visal Sok
- Artists like Peap Tarr, Fonki, the cartoonist Séra, and singers such as Tony Keo (Canadian) and Laura Mam (USA)
- Professional athletic members include Tep Rivihit, the general secretary of the Cambodian tennis federation and the N°1 Cambodian professional tennis player Kenny Bun (French), as well as French-Khmer football/soccer players Thierry Chantha Bin, and Boris Kok.
- Pily Wong, the former president of the French Chamber of Commerce, is an Anvaya counselor.
- Entrepreneur and investor Thierry Tea is the founder of the PhilJets Group and Agama Investments, People of the Year awardee in the Philippines, and also a Foreign Trade Adviser for France.
- The current president of Anvaya, Soreasmey Ke Bin, is also the secretary general of the French Chamber of Commerce

== Financing ==
The association is financed by donations and membership fees. In 2015 the French Member of Parliament, Thierry Mariani subsidized Anvaya on his diplomatic reserve.

== Activities ==
Anvaya has several types of activities to support their members in Cambodia and overseas, including:

- An Afterwork event every second Thursday for members residing in Cambodia,
- A monthly dinner revolving around Cambodian personalities from the government or from Cambodian society, including the French Ambassador, Mr. Jean-Claude Poimboeuf, the director Rithy Panh, the deputy Hun Many or the deputy from the opposition, Mu Sochua.
- Symposiums on the purpose of the Diaspora at the French Institute of Cambodia in July 2012 and April 2013,
- Khmer courses, both oral and literature, for Anvaya members in Phnom Penh,

Anvaya also holds regular cultural and sporting outings. Some examples include:

- Members accompanied Father François Ponchuaud to recall the events of April 1975,
- Treks and outings in the forest such as tree planting or environmental-site cleaning projects to support community development.

Anvaya furthermore has a football team in Phnom Penh, called Anvaya Keila, which may be replicated in Lyon (France). Besides this, some Anvaya members are distinguishing themselves in different sport competitions (tennis, half-marathon etc....)

== Relationship with authorities ==
Although Anvaya is non-political, it keeps a strong open dialogue with Cambodian authorities within the government. For example, in October 2012, Anvaya went to the Royal Palace to pay tribute to the King Father Norodom Sihanouk. Anvaya was invited to this time of remembrance by Prince Norodom Ranariddh to be present in the capacity of an element of the civil society. A MOU was signed in March 2014 with the Cambodian Olympic Committee in which Anvaya was to recruit athletes from Diaspora for future sporting events such as the SEA Games and the Olympic games.

In November 2013, Anvaya signed an agreement with the French Embassy to build a memorial for the victims of the Khmer Rouge. The monument was designed by Ing Séra, a French-Cambodian artist. The project was recognized by the Extraordinary Chambers in the Courts of Cambodia as a meaningful reparation for Khmer Rouge victims. The construction started in summer 2015, a first piece has been installed in June 2017, and the official inauguration is planned for October 2017.

== Anvaya Reatrei ==
In March 2015, Anvaya organized its first Gala known as Anvaya Reatrei. This event gathered more than 150 people and awarded the "Members of the Year". Rithy Panh was awarded "Best Director", and Thierry Chantha Bin was awarded "Best Athlete". The French-Cambodian Borany Mam was awarded the best activist for her association ASPK and their efforts to restore and protect the painting at the National Museum of Phnom Penh. Tony Keo, a Canadian singer, won an award for musical performance. American-Cambodian Chanda Hun won "Best Entrepreneur", and Peap Tarr won "Best Designer".
