= Phnom Penh stampede =

2010 crowd crush in Phnom Penh

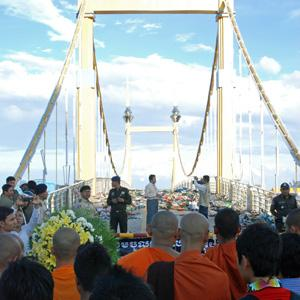
- Buddhist monks chant prayers for the dead at bridge
- Date: 22 November 2010
- Time: 21:30 local (14:30 UTC)
- Location: Diamond Gate Bridge; 11°33′22″N 104°56′22″E
- Deaths: 347
- Injuries: 755+

The Phnom Penh crowd crush occurred on 22 November 2010 when 347 people were killed and another 755 injured during a crowd crush (historically referred to as a "stampede") at the Water Festival celebrations on the Diamond Gate Bridge of Diamond Island, in Cambodia.

== Background ==
The incident occurred at the end of the three-day Water Festival to celebrate the end of the monsoon season and the semiannual reversal of flow of the Tonlé Sap River. Initial reports suggest that festival-goers had gathered on Koh Pich ("Diamond Island"), a spit of land stretching into the Tonlé Sap, to watch boat races and then a concert. Around four million people had attended the festival.

It was the third incident in the festival's history resulting in fatalities, though it was by far the worst; five rowers on a boat drowned in 2008, and another drowned in 2009.

== Incident ==
The crowd crush began at 21:30 local time (14:30 UTC) on a bridge across the river, though witnesses said that people had been "stuck on the bridge" for several hours before, and victims were not freed until hours after the crowd crush began. 347 people died, and upwards of 755 more people were injured, some seriously, and many local hospitals were pushed far beyond capacity by the influx of victims. At one point, the death toll had been listed as being 456, but on 25 November, the government decreased its official death toll to 347, based on the total put forth by Cambodian minister of social affairs Ith Sam Heng.

=== Cause ===
A witness said the cause of the crowd crush was "too many people on the bridge and...both ends were pushing. This caused a sudden panic. The pushing caused those in the middle to fall to the ground, then [get] crushed." While trying to get away, he said that people pulled down electrical wires, causing more people to die of electrocution. These claims were backed up by one of the doctors treating patients, who said that electrocution and suffocation were the primary causes of death among the casualties, though the government disputed the claims of electric shock.

A journalist from The Phnom Penh Post said that the crush had occurred due to police forces firing a water cannon into people on the bridge in an attempt to force them to move after it began swaying, which triggered panic.

Information Minister Khieu Kanharith said that the incident began when panic broke out after several people fell unconscious on the crowded island.

== Reaction ==
Cambodian Prime Minister Hun Sen said that "with this miserable event, I would like to share my condolences with my compatriots and the family members of the victims." He ordered an inquiry to be conducted and declared 25 November to be a day of mourning. The investigation was conducted by a special committee collecting witness testimony. Preliminary reports released on 24 November stated that the incident had been triggered by the swaying of the bridge, which caused panic.

The government said it would pay five million riel (US$1,250) to the families of each of the dead and a million riel ($250) to each of the injured. On 24 November, the government announced plans to construct a stupa as a memorial to those killed.

On 23 November, the day after the incident, around 500 Buddhist monks visited the site to chant prayers for the dead.
