= Khmer people =

Austroasiatic ethnic group

ជនជាតិខ្មែរ
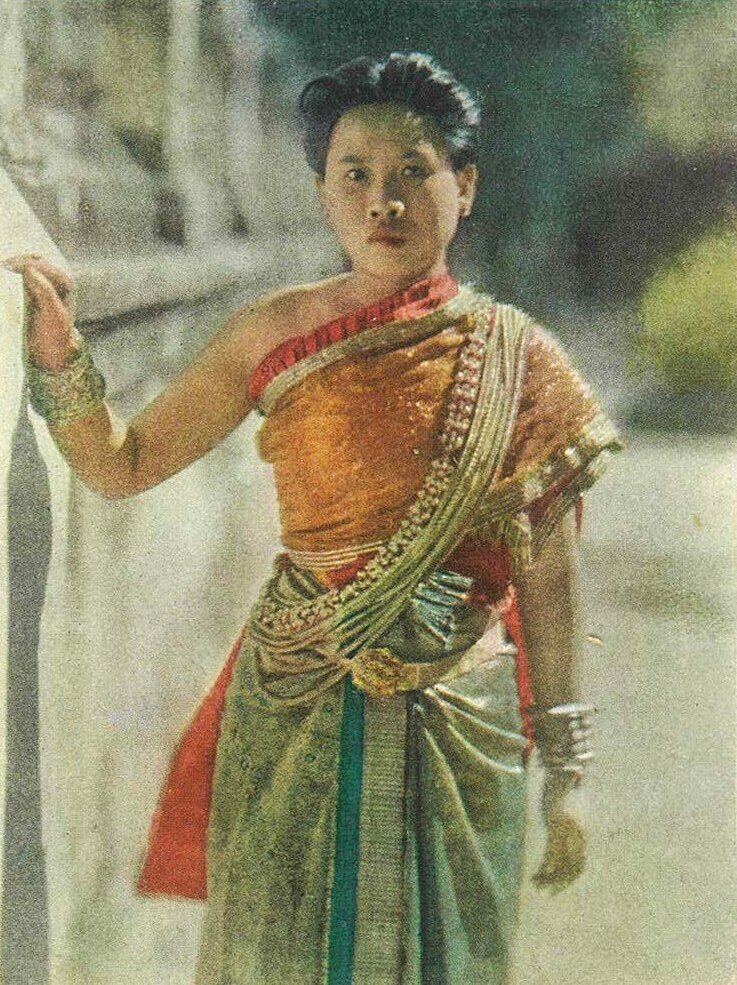
- Photo of a Khmer bride in traditional clothing featuring the sbai (ceremonial breast sash) and sampot sarabap (brocade silk skirt) draped as ka'at kbal neak ("folded like a naga head"), by Gervais-Courtellemont, published in 1928

Total population
- c. 19–21 million

Regions with significant populations
- Cambodia: 15,969,386
- Vietnam: 1,320,000
- Thailand: 1,146,685
- United States: 376,096
- France: 80,000
- South Korea: 65,002
- Australia: 57,096 (2021)
- Malaysia: 30,113
- Canada: 38,490
- Japan: 26,827 (2024)
- New Zealand: 11,514
- United Arab Emirates: 7,600
- Laos: 7,141
- Singapore: 3,224
- Switzerland: 3,000
- Belgium: 2,172
- Austria: 2,133
- Netherlands: 2,000
- Germany: 1,035
- United Kingdom: >1,560 (2021)
- Italy: 1,000
- New Caledonia: 1,000
- Sweden: 772
- Taiwan: 543–5,219
- Israel: 280 (2026)
- Denmark: 200
- Kuwait: 47
- Brazil: 35
- Philippines: 33
- Russia: 2–110

Languages
- Khmer

Religion
- Predominantly Theravada Buddhism; Hinduism and animism (historically); Christianity and Islam (minority)

Related ethnic groups
- Mon, Wa, other Austroasiatic peoples

The Khmer people (Khmer: ជនជាតិខ្មែរ, UNGEGN: Chǒnchiat Khmae, ALA-LC: Janajāti Khmaer [cɔn.ciət kʰmae]) are an ethnic group native to Cambodia. They comprise over 95% of Cambodia's population of 17 million. They speak the Khmer language, which is part of the larger Austroasiatic language family alongside Mon and Vietnamese.

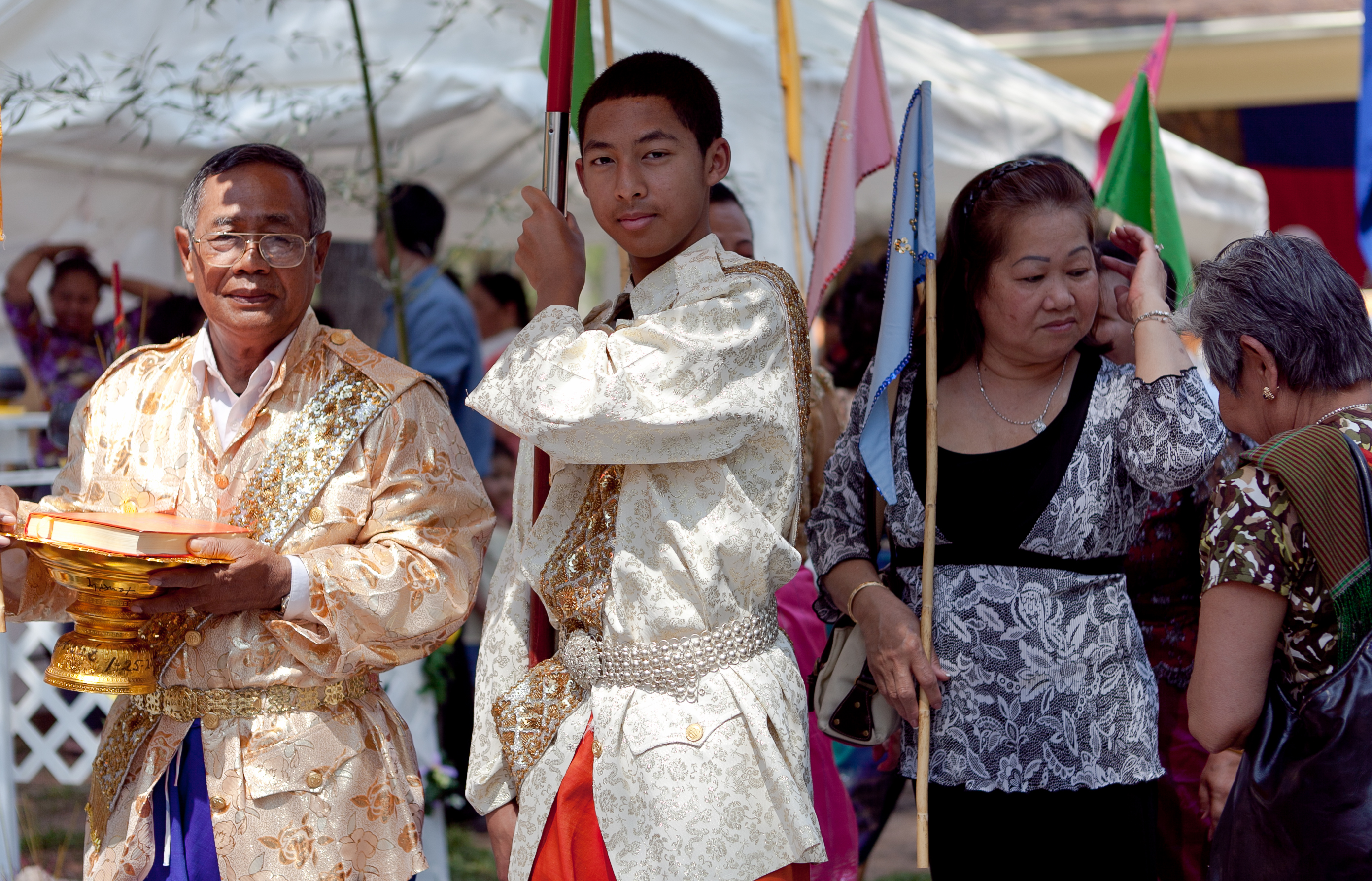
Khmer people in traditional Khmer attire during the new year

The majority of Khmer people follow Theravada Buddhism. Significant populations of Khmers reside in neighboring regions, including Northern Khmer communities in adjacent areas of Thailand and Khmer Krom communities in the Mekong Delta region of Vietnam. There are nearly one million Khmers in other diaspora communities, living mainly in the United States, France, and Australia.

Ethnic Khmers sometimes use a tripartite division to differentiate Khmers native to Thailand, Cambodia or Vietnam. Those native to Thailand are sometimes referred to as "Khmer Loeu" due to their location on the southern Khorat Plateau relative to those native to Cambodia, "Khmer Kandal" or "Khmer (Kang)knong" ("central Khmer"), while Khmer native to the lower Mekong Delta region of Vietnam are called "Khmer Krom" ("lower Khmer" or "southern Khmer"). In the Khmer language, a use of the term "Khmer Loeu" is in reference to the Northern Khmer people, not to be confused with the non-ethnic Khmer people which share the same term.

== Distribution ==
The majority of the world's Khmers live in Cambodia, the population of which is over 95% Khmer.

=== Thailand, Vietnam and Laos ===
Additionally, a large number of Khmer people live Thailand and Vietnam. In Thailand, there are over one million Khmers (known as the Khmer Surin), most of whom are located in Surin (Sorin), Buriram (Borei Rom) and Sisaket (Srei Saket) provinces. Estimates for the number of the Khmer population in Vietnam (known as the Khmer Krom) vary from the 1.3 million given by the government of Vietnam to seven million advocated by the Khmers Kampuchea-Krom Federation. There has been some Khmer migration into Laos, where Khmer communities reside in the southwestern tip of Laos, at the borders of Thailand and Cambodia.

Percentage of the total Khmer population in various provinces of Thailand
Province	1990	2000
Buriram	0.3%	27.6%
Chanthaburi	0.6%	1.6%
Maha Sarakham	0.2%	0.3%
Roi Et	0.4%	0.5%
Sa Kaew	—N/a	1.9%
Sisaket	30.2%	26.2%
Surin	63.4%	47.2%
Trat	0.4%	2.1%
Ubon Ratchathani	0.8%	0.3%

Percentage of the total Khmer population in various provinces of Vietnam
Province	2019
Sóc Trăng	30.18%
Trà Vinh	31.53%
Kiên Giang	12.26%

Percentage of the total Khmer population in various provinces of Laos
Province	2015
Champassak	0.95%

=== Western nations ===
Due to migration as a result of the Cambodian Civil War and Cambodian genocide, there is a large Khmer diaspora residing in the United States, Canada, Australia, and France.

== History ==
=== Origin myths ===
According to the Khmer legend noted by George Coedes in the 10th-century Baksei Chamkrong inscription of the Khmer Empire, the Khmers arose from the union of the sage Kambu Swayambhuva and the apsara ("celestial nymph") Mera. Their marriage is said to have given rise to the name Khmer and founded the monarchy of Cambodia.

A more popular legend known as Preah Thong and Neang Neak, reenacted to this day in the traditional Khmer wedding ceremony and taught in elementary schools, and also recorded in the Baksei Chamkrong inscription, holds that Cambodia was created when a merchant named Kaundinya I (commonly referred to as Preah Thong) married princess Soma, a Nāga (Neang Neak) princess. Kaundinya sailed to Southeast Asia following an arrow he saw in a dream. Upon arrival he found an island called Kok Thlok and, after conquering Soma's Naga army, he fell in love with her. As a dowry, the father of princess Soma drank the waters around the island, which was revealed to be the top of a mountain, and the land below that was uncovered became Cambodia. Kaundinya and Soma and their descendants became known as the Khmers and are said to have been the rulers of Funan, Chenla and the Khmer Empire. This myth further explains why the oldest Khmer wats, or temples, were always built on mountaintops, and why today mountains themselves are still revered as holy places.

=== Arrival in Southeast Asia ===
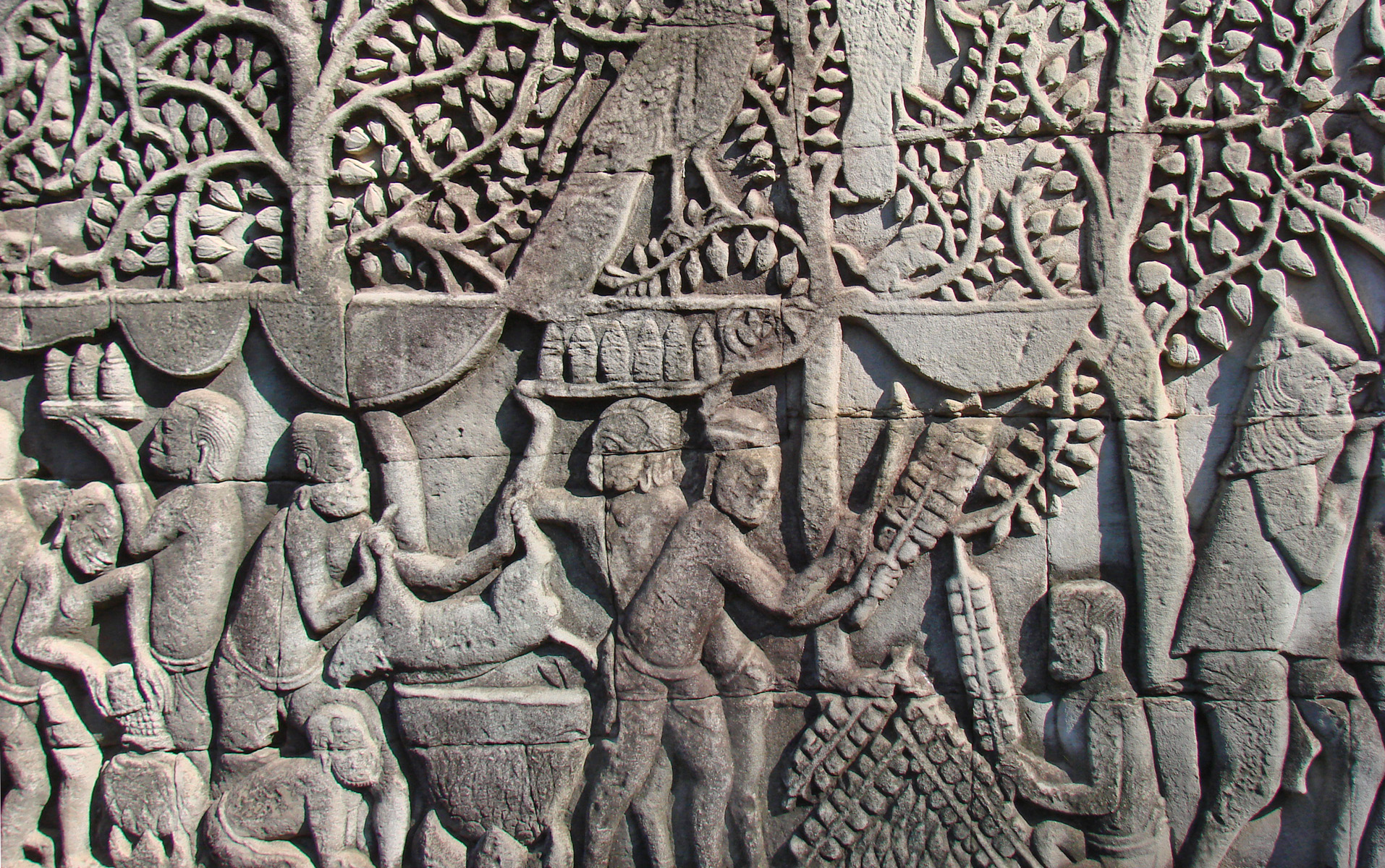
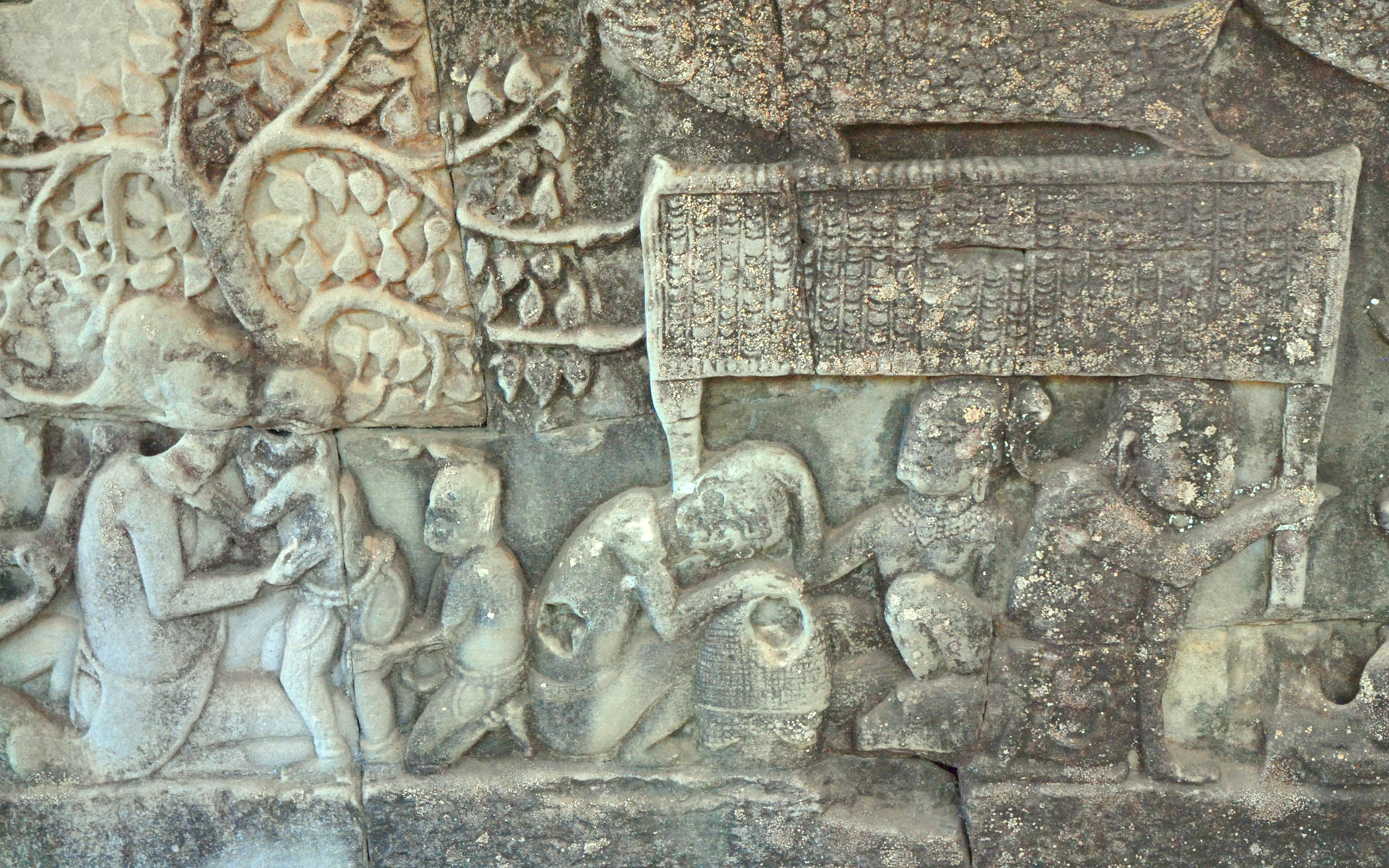
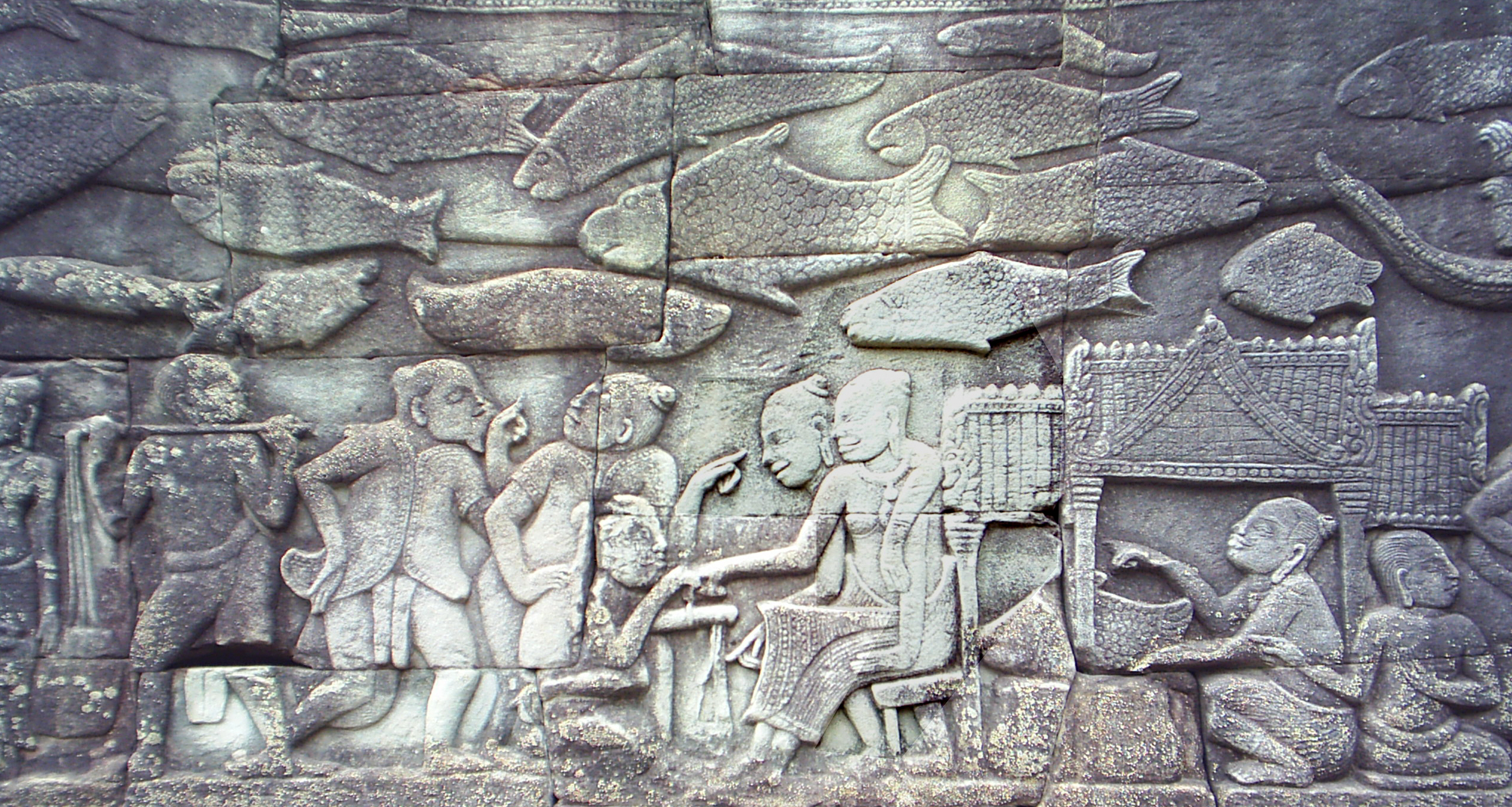
12th-century bas-relief from the Bayon temple showing Khmer daily life during the Khmer Empire

The Khmers, an Austroasiatic people, are one of the oldest ethnic groups in the area, having filtered into Southeast Asia from southern China, possibly Yunnan, or from Northeast India around the same time as the Mon, who settled further west on the Indochinese Peninsula and to whom the Khmer are ancestrally related. Most archaeologists and linguists, and other specialists like Sinologists and crop experts, believe that they arrived no later than 2000 BCE (over four thousand years ago) bringing with them the practice of agriculture and in particular the cultivation of rice. This region is also one of the first places in the world to use bronze. They were the builders of the later Khmer Empire, which dominated Southeast Asia for six centuries beginning in 802, and now form the mainstream of political, cultural, and economic Cambodia.

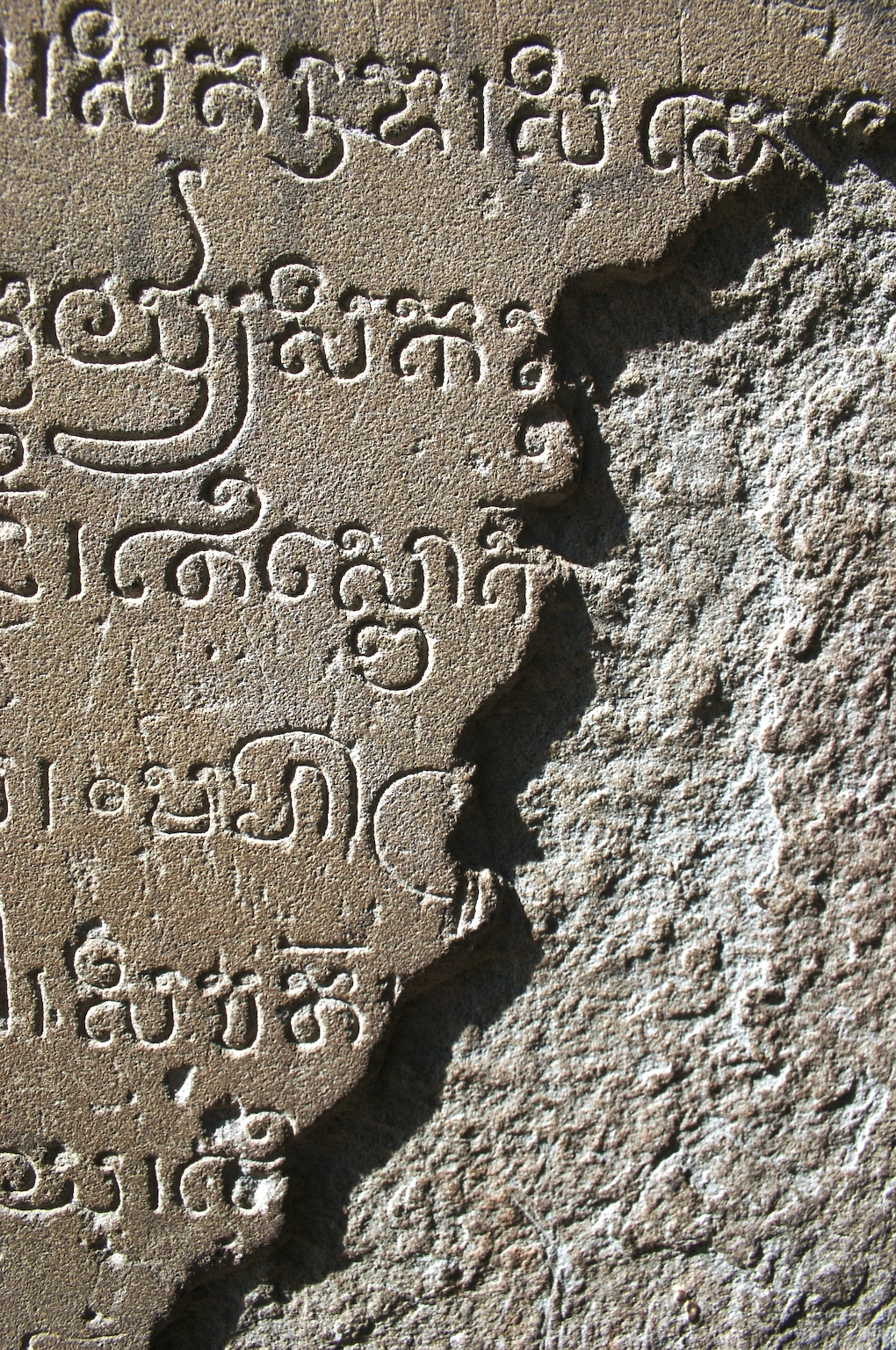
Ancient Khmer script

The Khmers developed the Khmer script, which in turn gave birth to the later Thai and Lao scripts. The Khmers are considered by archaeologists and ethnologists to be indigenous to the contiguous regions of Isan, southern Laos, Cambodia and South Vietnam. That is to say the Cambodians have historically been a lowland people who lived close to one of the tributaries of the Mekong River. The reason they migrated into Southeast Asia is not well understood, but scholars believe that Austroasiatic speakers were pushed south by invading Tibeto-Burman speakers from the north as evident by Austroasiatic vocabulary in Chinese, because of agricultural purposes as evident by their migration routes along major rivers, or a combination of these and other factors.

The Khmer are considered a part of the Indian cultural sphere, owing to them adopting Indian culture, traditions and religious identities. The first powerful trading kingdom in Southeast Asia, the Kingdom of Funan, was established in southeastern Cambodia and the Mekong Delta in the first century, although extensive archaeological work in Angkor Borei District near the modern Vietnamese border has unearthed brickworks, canals, cemeteries and graves dating to the fifth century BCE.

During the Funan period (1st–6th centuries CE) the Khmer also acquired Buddhism, the concept of the Shaiva imperial cult of the devaraja and the great temple as a symbolic world mountain. The rival Khmer Chenla Kingdom emerged in the fifth century and later conquered the Kingdom of Funan. Chenla was an upland state whose economy was reliant on agriculture whereas Funan was a lowland state with an economy dependent on maritime trade.

These two states, even after conquest by Chenla in the sixth century, were constantly at war with each other and smaller principalities. During the Chenla period (5th–8th centuries), Khmers left the world's earliest known zero in one of their temple inscriptions. Only when King Jayavarman II declared an independent and united Cambodia in 802 was there relative peace between the two lands, upper and lowland Cambodia.

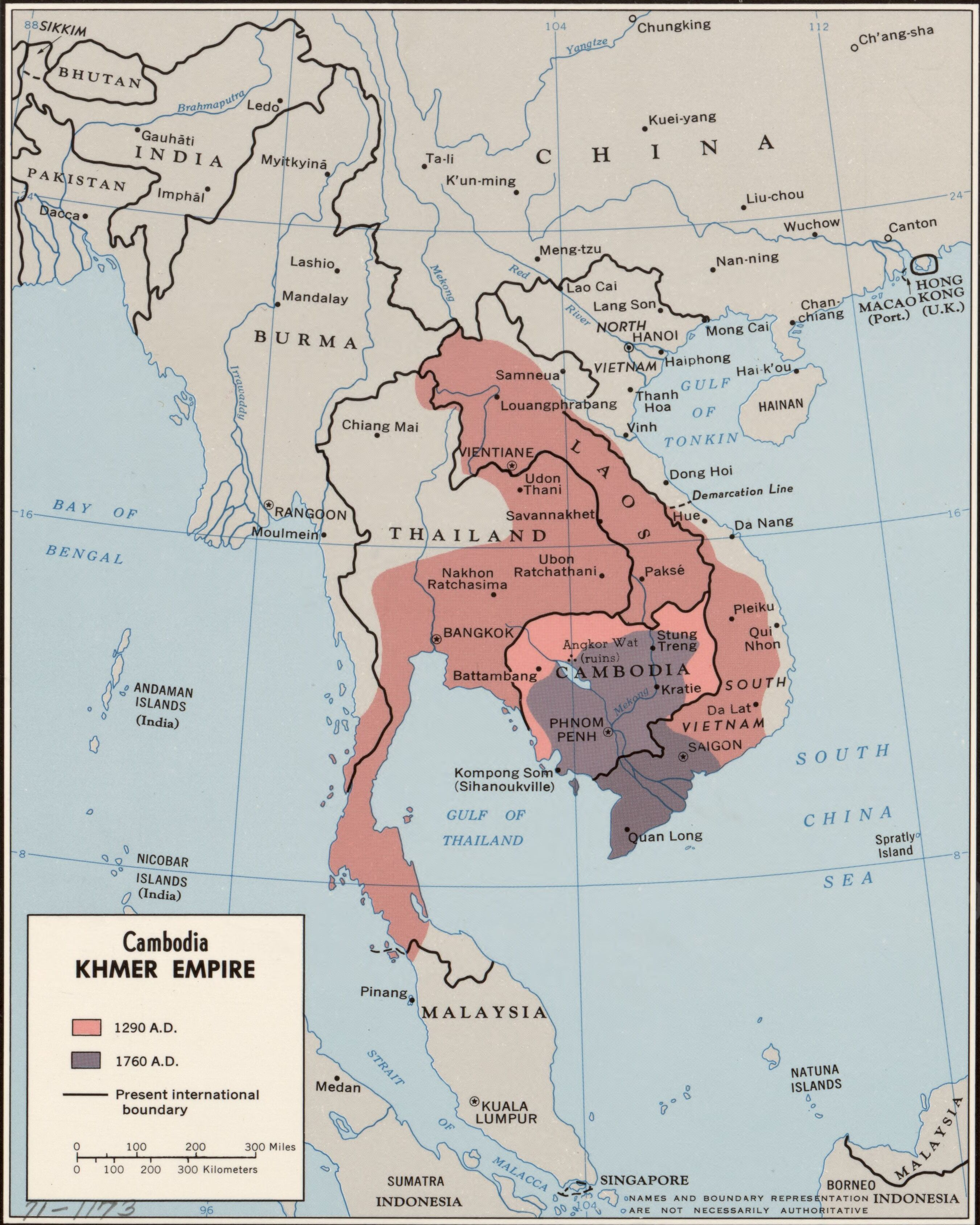
Map of South-east Asia showing Cambodia's territorial expansion from 1290 A.D. to present-day

Jayavarman II (802–830) revived Khmer power and built the foundation for the Khmer Empire, founding three capitals—Indrapura, Hariharalaya, and Mahendraparvata—the archeological remains of which reveal much about his times. After winning a long civil war, Suryavarman I (reigned 1002–1050) turned his forces eastward and subjugated the Mon kingdom of Dvaravati. Consequently, he ruled over the greater part of present-day Thailand and Laos, as well as the northern half of the Malay Peninsula. This period, during which Angkor Wat was constructed, is considered the apex of Khmer civilization.

=== Khmer Empire (802–1431) ===
The Khmer kingdom became the Khmer Empire and the great temples of Angkor, considered an archeological treasure replete with detailed stone bas-reliefs showing many aspects of the culture, including some musical instruments, remain as monuments to the culture of the Cambodia. After the death of Suryavarman II (1113–1150), Cambodia lapsed into chaos until Jayavarman VII (1181–1218) ordered the construction of a new city. He was a Buddhist, and for a time, Buddhism became the dominant religion in Cambodia. As a state religion, however, it was adapted to suit the Deva Raja cult, with a Buddha Raja being substituted for the former Shiva Raja or Vishnu Raja.

The rise of the Tai kingdoms of Sukhothai (1238) and Ayutthaya (1350) resulted in almost ceaseless wars with the Khmers and led to the destruction of Angkor in 1431. They are said to have carried off 90,000 prisoners, many of whom were likely dancers and musicians. The period following 1432, with the Khmer people bereft of their treasures, documents, and human culture bearers, was one of precipitous decline.

=== Post-empire (1431–present) ===
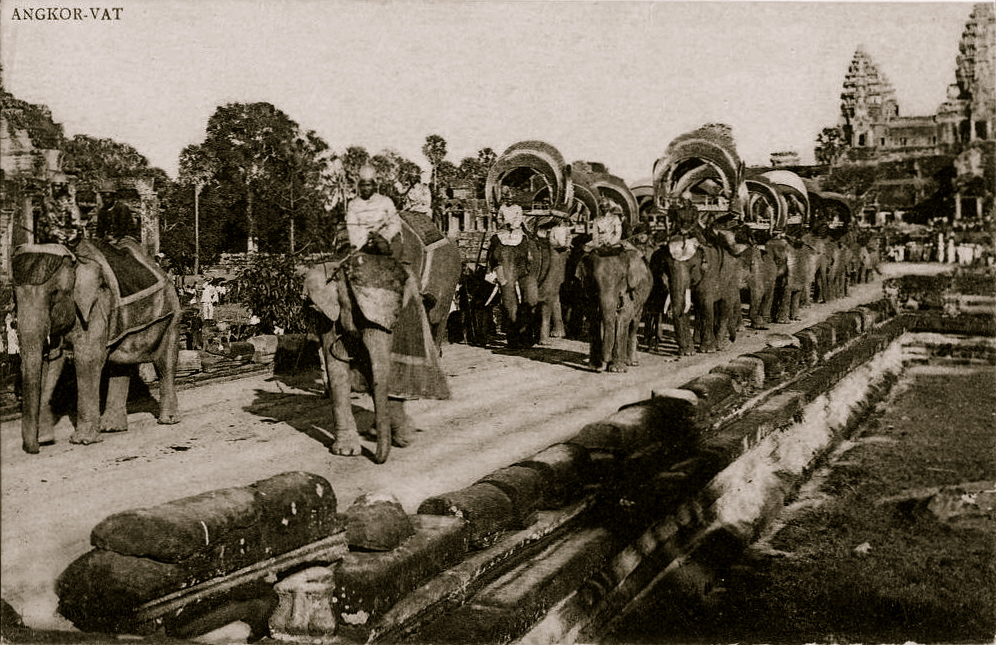
Angkor Wat in the 1900s

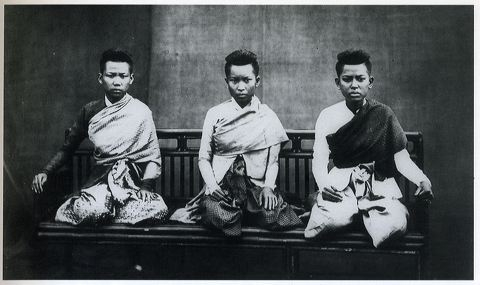
Upper-class Khmer women in the 1800s

In 1434, King Ponhea Yat made Phnom Penh his capital, and Angkor was abandoned to the jungle. Due to continued Siamese and Vietnamese aggression, Cambodia appealed to France for protection in 1863 and became a French protectorate in 1864. During the 1880s, along with southern Vietnam and Laos, Cambodia was drawn into the French-controlled Indochinese Union. For nearly a century, the French exploited Cambodia commercially, and demanded power over politics, economics, and social life.

During the second half of the twentieth century, the political situation in Cambodia became chaotic. King Norodom Sihanouk (later, Prince, then again King), proclaimed Cambodia's independence in 1949 (granted in full in 1953) and ruled the country until March 18, 1970, when he was overthrown by General Lon Nol, who established the Khmer Republic. On April 17, 1975, Khmer Rouge, who under the leadership of Pol Pot combined Khmer nationalism and extreme Communism, came to power and virtually destroyed the Cambodian people and their health, morality, education, physical environment, and culture in the Cambodian genocide.

On January 7, 1979, Vietnamese forces ousted the Khmer Rouge. After more than ten years of painfully slow rebuilding, with only meager outside help, the United Nations intervened resulting in the Paris Peace Accord on October 23, 1992, and created conditions for general elections in May 1993, leading to the formation of the current government and the restoration of Prince Sihanouk to power as King in 1993.

Pol Pot died on April 15, 1998, reportedly from heart failure. Sources speculate his death may have been a result of poisoning or even suicide. His death marked the formal end of the Khmer Rouge regime as a significant political and military force. However, a residual Khmer Rouge movement remained in Cambodia for almost two more decades, largely operating from remote jungle regions near the Thai border. Immediately, the post-Pol Pot years marked intense efforts to rebuild the country. Cambodia had suffered enormous loss of life, widespread trauma and a shattered infrastructure. The Cambodian government, now under the leadership of the Cambodian People's Party (CPP) and the monarchist Norodom Sihanouk, faced significant challenges.

== Culture and society ==
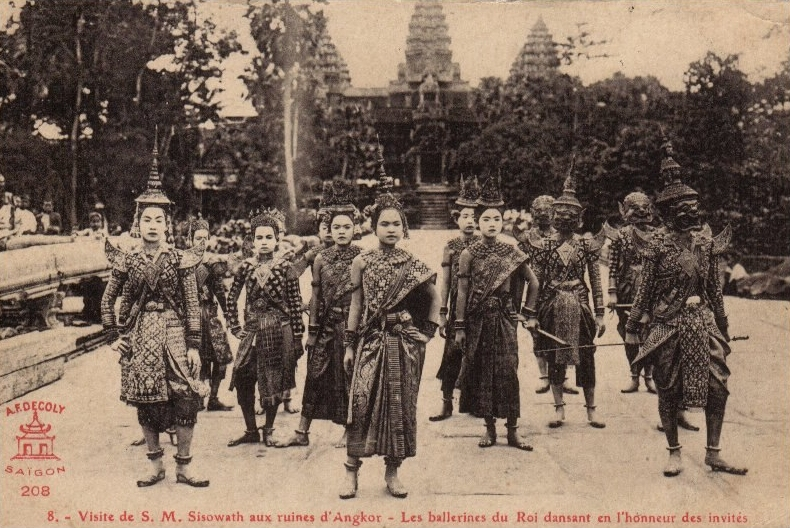
Khmer dancers at Angkor Wat, 1920s

The culture of the ethnic Khmers is fairly homogeneous throughout their geographic range. Regional dialects exist, but are mutually intelligible. The standard is based on the dialect spoken throughout the Central Plain, a region encompassed by the northwest and central provinces. The varieties of Khmer spoken in this region are representative of the speech of the majority of the population. A unique and immediately recognizable dialect has developed in Phnom Penh that, due to the city's status as the national capital, has been modestly affected by recent French and Vietnamese influence. Other dialects are Northern Khmer dialect, called Khmer Surin by Khmers, spoken by over a million Khmer native to Northeast Thailand; and Khmer Krom spoken by the millions of Khmer native to the Mekong Delta regions of Vietnam adjacent to Cambodia and their descendants abroad. A little-studied dialect known as Western Khmer, or Cardamom Khmer, is spoken by a small, isolated population in the Cardamom Mountain range extending from Cambodia into eastern Central Thailand. Although little studied, it is unique in that it maintains a definite system of vocal register that has all but disappeared in other dialects of modern Khmer. The modern Khmer strongly identify their ethnic identity with their religious beliefs and practices, which combine the tenets of Theravada Buddhism with elements of indigenous ancestor-spirit worship, animism and shamanism. Most Cambodians, whether or not they profess to be Buddhists or other faiths, believe in a rich supernatural world. Several types of supernatural entities are believed to exist; they make themselves known by means of inexplicable sounds or happenings. Among these phenomena are kmaoch ខ្មោច (ghosts), pret ប្រែត (comes in many forms depending on their punishments) and beisach បិសាច(monsters) [these are usually the spirits of people who have died a violently, untimely, or unnatural deaths]; arak អារក្ស (evil spirits, devils), ahp krasue, neak ta អ្នកតា (tutelary spirit or entity residing in inanimate objects; land, water, trees etc.), chomneang/mneang phteah ជំនាងផ្ទះ/ម្នាងផ្ទះ(house guardians), meba មេបា (ancestral spirits), and mrenh kongveal ម្រេញគង្វាល (little mischief spirit guardians dressed in red). All spirits must be shown proper respect, and, with the exception of the mneang phteah and mrenh kongveal, they can cause trouble ranging from mischief to serious life-threatening illnesses.

The majority of the Cambodians live in rural villages either as rice farmers or fishermen. Their life revolves around the Wat (temple) and the various Buddhist ceremonies throughout the year. However, if Cambodians become ill, they will frequently see a kru khmae (shaman/healer), whom they believe can diagnose which of the many spirits has caused the illness and recommend a course of action to propitiate the offended spirit, thereby curing the illness. The kru khmae is also learned in herb lore and is often sought to prepare various "medicines" and potions or for a magical tattoo, all believed to endow one with special prowess and ward off evil spirits or general bad luck. Khmer beliefs also rely heavily on astrology, a remnant of Hinduism. A fortune teller, called hao-ra (astrologists) or kru teay in Khmer, is often consulted before major events, like choosing a spouse, beginning an important journey or business venture, setting the date for a wedding and determining the proper location for building new structures. Throughout the year, the Cambodian celebrate many holidays, most of a religious or spiritual nature, some of which are also observed as public holidays. The two most important are Chol Chhnam (Cambodian New Year) and Pchum Ben ("Ancestor Day"). The Cambodian Buddhist calendar is divided into 12 months with the traditional new year beginning on the first day of khae chaet, which coincides with the first new moon of April in the western calendar. The modern celebration has been standardized to coincide with April 13. Dance occupies a central place for the Khmer people, one of its earliest records dates back to the 7th century, where performances were used as a funeral rite for kings. In the 20th century, the use of dancers is also attested in funerary processions, such as that for King Sisowath Monivong. During the Angkor period, dance was ritually performed at temples. The temple dancers came to be considered as apsaras, who served as entertainers and messengers to divinities. Ancient stone inscriptions describe thousands of apsara dancers assigned to temples and performing divine rites as well as for the public. The Khmer classical dance was placed in 2003 on the UNESCO World Heritage List.

Cambodian culture has influenced Thai and Lao cultures and vice versa. Many Khmer loanwords are found in Thai and Lao, while many Lao and Thai loanwords are found in Khmer. The Thai and Lao alphabets are also derived from the Khmer script.

== Genetics ==
The Khmer people share close affinities with Northeastern Tai-Kadai groups from Thailand. Cambodians and Mons are also cladal with Central and Southern Thais and Nayu and differ in terms of their South Asian ancestry and in regards to Nayu especially, Atayal ancestry. There is also evidence of genetic input from Kinh Vietnamese.

The genetic testing website 23andMe groups Khmer people under the "Indonesian, Khmer, Thai & Myanmar" reference population. This reference population contains people who have had recent ancestors from Cambodia, Indonesia, Laos, Malaysia, Myanmar and Thailand.

=== Immunoglobulin G ===
Hideo Matsumoto, professor emeritus at Osaka Medical College tested Gm types, genetic markers of immunoglobulin G, of Khmer people for a 2009 study. The study found that the Gm afb1b3 is a southern marker gene possibly originating in southern China and found at high frequencies across southern China, Southeast Asia, Taiwan, and parts of the Pacific Islands as well as among Kacharis and Ahoms of Assam, India. The study found that the average frequency of Gm afb1b3 was 76.7% for the Khmer population.

== See also ==
- Anvaya (organization)
- Cambodian cuisine
