= Pung Kheav Se =

Cambodian businessman

Lok Neak Oknha Pung Kheav Se
- ពុង ឃាវសែ
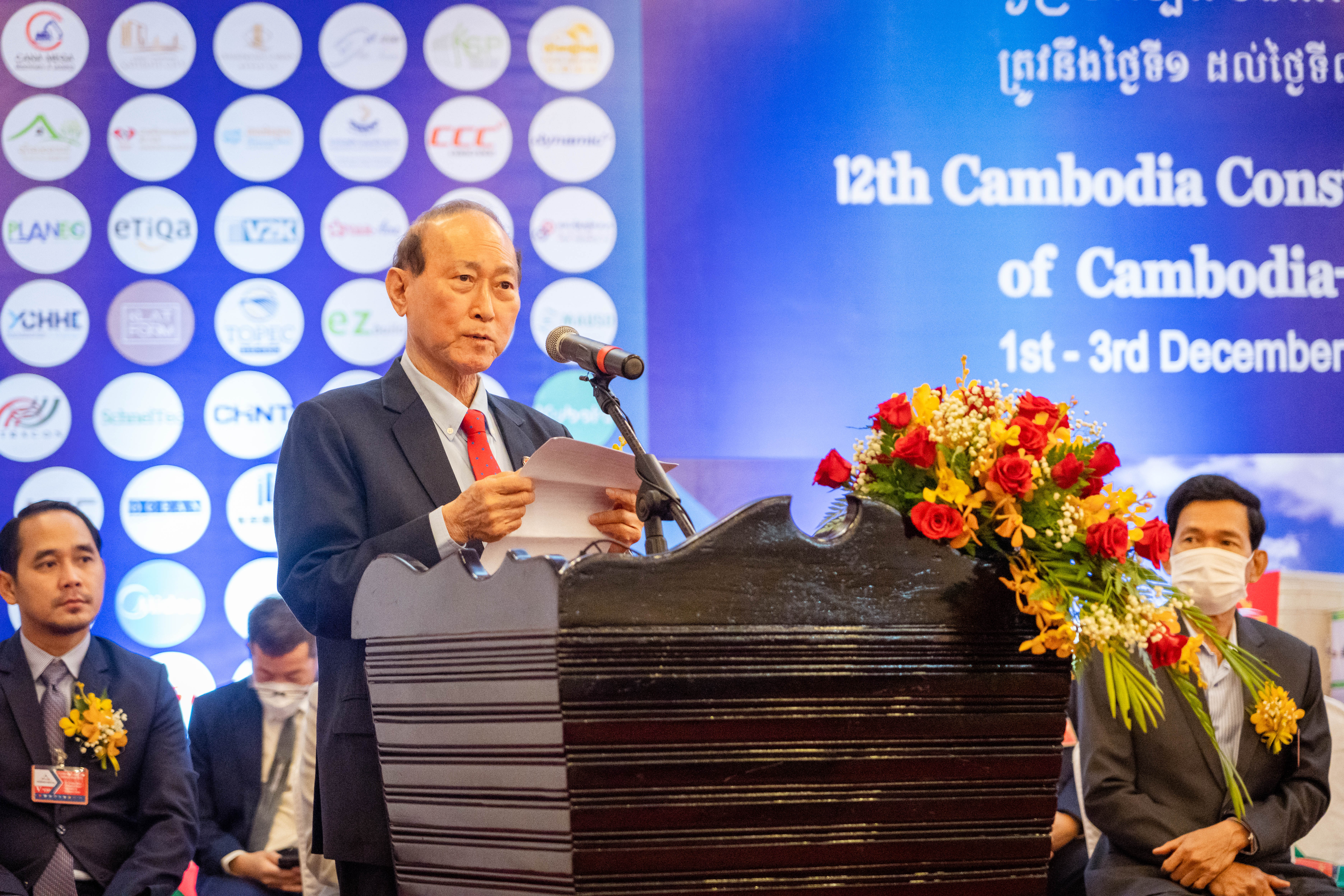
- Pung in 2022
- Born: 1948 (age 77–78); Cambodia, French Indochina
- Citizenship: Cambodia
- Education: Royal Academy of Cambodia (DBA)
- Occupations: Businessman, investor, philanthropist
- Years active: 1991–present
- Known for: Developing Techo International Airport
- Title: Chairman of Canadia Group
- Board member of: Overseas Cambodian Investment Corporation; Canadia Investment Holding; Cambodia Airport Investment Co., Ltd.; Canadia Bank

Chinese name
- Simplified Chinese: 方侨生
- Traditional Chinese: 方僑生
Transcriptions
Standard Mandarin
- Hanyu Pinyin: Fāng Qiáoshēng
- Website: OCIC

Pung Kheav Se (Khmer: ពុង ឃាវសែ), also known by his Chinese name Fang Qingsong (Chinese: 方侨生), is a Cambodian businessman, investor and philanthropist. He is the founder and chairman of Canadia Group, a multinational conglomerate which counts among its business entities Overseas Cambodian Investment Corporation and Canadia Investment Holdings. In addition, he founded Canadia Bank, one of Cambodia's oldest and largest commercial banks in terms of assets and net holding.

Since 17 January 2017, Pung Kheav Se has been the president of the Cambodian Chinese Association. He held the title of Lok Neak Oknha and served as a private advisor to Cambodian Prime Minister Hun Sen.

== Early life ==
Pung Kheav Se, also known by his Chinese name Fang Qiaosheng, was born in the late 1940s in Phnom Penh, Cambodia and is a Cambodian of Teochew descent. His father was a Cambodian overseas Chinese leader and a native of Puning, Guangdong. His parents named him "Qiaosheng" in the hope that he would "not forget his roots and remember that he is Chinese". Pung received education in Khmer, Chinese and French from a young age. After growing up, he worked as a manager in his father's company. With the country taken over by the Khmer Rouge in 1975, Pung fled to neighboring Thailand to seek refuge in a Thai refugee camp at the end of 1977. In May 1980, Pung soon secured a job as a salesman and later became a goldsmith in Montreal, Canada where he would spend the next eleven years of his life until his return to Cambodia in the early 1990s.

== Career ==
=== Early business career ===
Pung first worked as a salesman for eight months with the help of the immigration bureau. After that, he rented a small kiosk in a grocery shop in Montreal, Canada's Chinatown, and started his career as a goldsmith operating in the kiosk. At that time, Canada received a lot of Southeast Asian refugees, and most of the refugees bought goldware when they had savings, so Pung's goldsmith business was good. In 1986, Pung left the grocery store, rented an independent shop, and started a gold business. In 1988, Pung noticed that many Chinese Cambodians were remitting money to their relatives and friends in Cambodia, so he started a trust business and provided services such as remittances and money transfer. The remittance business continued to grow, and in 1990 it exceeded US$2 million.

=== Returning from Canada to Cambodia and founding Canadia Bank ===
Due to the large amount of remittance, Pung returned to Cambodia via Vietnam in January 1991. His uncle, Fang Bingzhen, was a senior advisor to Cambodian Prime Minister Hun Sen at the time. Through his uncle's introduction, he met with Chanto Chea, the Minister of Planning, and Cha Liang, the Governor of the National Bank of Cambodia. Afterwards, Pung decided to invest in Cambodia. Since he did not have enough funds to open a bank, he initially partnered with the government to establish a trust company. Canadia Gold & Trust Corporation opened on 11 November 1991. In order to raise funds to open a bank, he raised US$3 million from 100 fellow Canadians, of which his family's funds accounted for more than half. The company began offering financial services and issuance of gold coins. In the years that followed, Pung served as a longtime Chairperson of the Association of Banks of Cambodia and has since been renowned as Cambodia's banking pioneer and foremost financial magnate.

In 1993, the trust company was upgraded to Canadia Bank. In the same year, Pung founded The Commercial News. In 2000, the bank split into two companies: Canadia Investment Holdings and Overseas Cambodian Investment Corporation (OCIC). Since its inception and privatization in 1998, Canadia Bank has grown into one of the largest commercial banks in the Kingdom with total assets amounting to US$7.6 billion with a net profit of US$129 million as of 2021.

=== Overseas Cambodian Investment Corporation ===
With a diversified business interest, Pung's venture into non-financial services and solutions led to the creation of one of Cambodia's largest investment and development companies with various property development projects such as Sorya Shopping Center, Cambodia's first ever mall, Canadia Tower, the Kingdom's first skyscraper, Koh Pich, Chroy Changvar Bay. Other projects include Canadia Industrial Park, Phnom Penh Cultural Center, Folk Culture Village, Sihanoukville Independent Hotel and Canadia Garden. In March 2019, Pung and OCIC undertook the project of the 2,600 hectare Techo International Airport, one of the world's largest airports by land size. Since 2020, Pung's OCIC and its affiliates has invested an estimated US$5 billion in numerous public and social infrastructure projects throughout Cambodia with more projects in works such as Norea City, the Kong Sam Ol Overpass, the Russey Keo Bridge and Russey Keo Flyover, the Koh Norea Bridge and more to come.

=== Political activities ===
On 17 January 2017, Pung was appointed as the fifth president of the Cambodian Chinese Association, and was re-elected as the sixth president in 2022. On 25 December 2019, Pung was appointed as an advisor to the Cambodian Civil Society Alliance Forum, with an official position equivalent to a minister. In July 2023, Pung was granted the title of Oknha. On 26 Apriil 2024, Pung was granted the title of Lok Neak Oknha.

== Philanthropy ==
In 2020 and 2021, Pung made significant contributions in support of Cambodia's fight against COVID-19 by donating a total of US$8 million in the purchase of vaccines, support of general activities and the expansion of health-related facilities.

== Awards ==
In 2002, Pung was awarded the Mahaserey Vattanac Award by the His Majesty, the late Norodom Sihanouk, King-Father of Cambodia, and The Highest National Contribution Medal awarded by His Excellency, Prime Minister Hun Sen and presented by His Majesty, King Norodom Sihamoni of Cambodia in 2012. In November 2019, the Royal Academy of Cambodia awarded Pung an honorary doctorate in business management.
