= The Commercial News =

Chinese-language newspaper in Cambodia

- Type: Daily newspaper
- Format: Broadsheet
- Owner: Cambodia-China Media Group
- Founder: Pung Kheav Se
- Founded: December 17, 1993; 32 years ago
- Language: Chinese
- Headquarters: No. 126-130, Charles de Gaulle Boulevard, Phnom Penh
- Country: Cambodia
- Website: huashangnews.com (defunct)

Chinese name
- Simplified Chinese: 华商日报
- Traditional Chinese: 華商日報
Transcriptions
Standard Mandarin
- Hanyu Pinyin: Huáshāng Rìbào

The Commercial News is a Chinese-language newspaper in Cambodia, founded by Pung Kheav Se on 17 December 1993.

== History ==
During the Democratic Kampuchea period, all newspapers in Cambodia were shut down. After the Cambodian–Vietnamese War, the Khmer Rouge launced an insurgency, and only four new newspapers were established during the insurgency. In 1991, the United Nations established the United Nations Transitional Authority in Cambodia to oversee the 1993 Cambodian general election to end the insurgency. As the political environment in Cambodia gradually stabilized, Chinese Cambodians and Chinese businessmen who had previously left Cambodia gradually returned, and the local Chinese community had a demand for information. Pung Kheav Se noticed this demand and found seven media professionals to start The Commercial News. The newspaper bought a typesetting software called "Qitian Dasheng" from Thailand and hired local Cambodian women to learn Chinese input methods. The printing equipment was purchased by Pung Kheav Se from overseas printing companies, mainly old equipment that had been phased out. The founding date was 17 December 1993. It was the first Chinese newspaper after Cambodia ended its insurgency. The newspaper's mission was to "promote Chinese culture, facilitate business exchanges, serve overseas Chinese, and promote Cambodia-China friendship". The first president of the newspaper was Pung Kheav Se's wife.

The newspaper did not become self-sufficient until 1996, and its readers were mainly Chinese businessmen in Cambodia. In its early days, the newspaper had only 4 pages and was published every two days. Later, it increased to 8 pages and became a daily newspaper. Except for Sundays when it was closed, it was published from Monday to Saturday, with a circulation of about 3,000 copies. Nowadays, the daily newspaper has 12 pages, namely the front page, local page, overseas Chinese page, recreation page, digest page, entertainment page, local style page and advertising page. On Thursdays when students have classes, there is an additional 6-page "Chinese Campus" page, and on Fridays, there is an irregular fashion page. Among them, the sports page and recreation page are cooperating with China News Service, and the overseas Chinese page and health page are cooperating with Nanfang Daily. Since Cambodian universities do not have journalism majors, newspaper reporters are trained by the newspaper itself or hired from China. In August 2013, the newspaper began a long-term cooperation with the School of Journalism and Communication of Jinan University, providing internship opportunities. Most of the reports were translations of local English and Khmer newspapers in Cambodia. The newspaper had no news editing rules, but the editor-in-chief required that the articles be "good-looking" and "close to the people". At the same time, since the articles were mainly translations of already published news, the newspaper did not pay much attention to fact-checking. When the editor-in-chief encountered contradictory content during the review, he usually chose to delete it directly.

In May 2013, The Commercial News became the first Cambodian media to open a WeChat public account. The public account was operated by the newspaper's new media team, whose members were not former employees of the newspaper, but newly recruited college students. The public account developed rapidly, and the number of followers exceeded the number of newspaper subscribers by several times. The new media team and the newspaper team began to have conflicts over content release, operation methods and advertising revenue sharing. Finally, the head of the new media team resigned and refused to assist in upgrading the public account to a corporate public account, and the account was abandoned. Around the Spring Festival of 2015, the new head registered a new WeChat public account, "Huashang Media". Since WeChat could not verify Cambodian business licenses, the newspaper found a Chinese company to borrow its business license. On 11 November 2015, the newspaper's corporate public account was successfully opened, and the name "Huashang Media" was retained. In the same year, the new media team invested US$3,000 and spent three months making a news website and mobile application for the newspaper. Both were released in October.

In March 2014, the overseas edition of Nanfang Daily and The Commercial News joined hands to launch in Cambodia. In 2019, Guangxi Daily and The Commercial News cooperated to build the "Guangxi Cloud ASEAN (Cambodia) International Communication Liaison Station" in Phnom Penh, Cambodia. On 18 November 2019, The Commercial News and The Cambodia China Times merged to form Cambodia-Chinese Media Group, with Ruan Zhiqiang serving as the group's general manager. In July 2022, The Commercial News established a branch office in Preah Sihanouk province. Currently, The Commercial News is a member of the Global Business Newspaper Alliance and the World Chinese Media Cooperation Alliance.
