= Canadian International School of Phnom Penh =

Private international school in Phnom Penh, Cambodia

- សាលាអន្តរជាតិកាណាដា
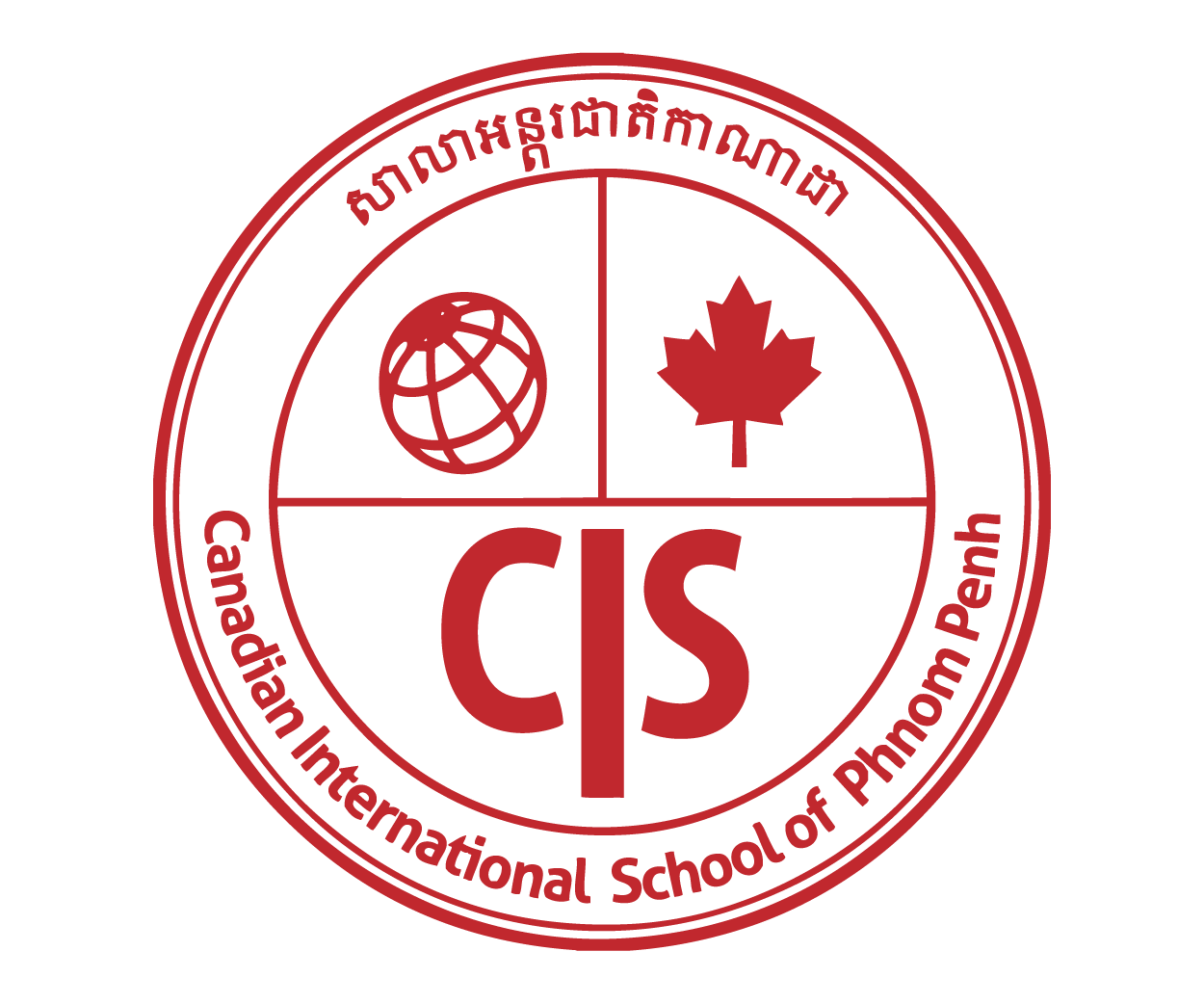

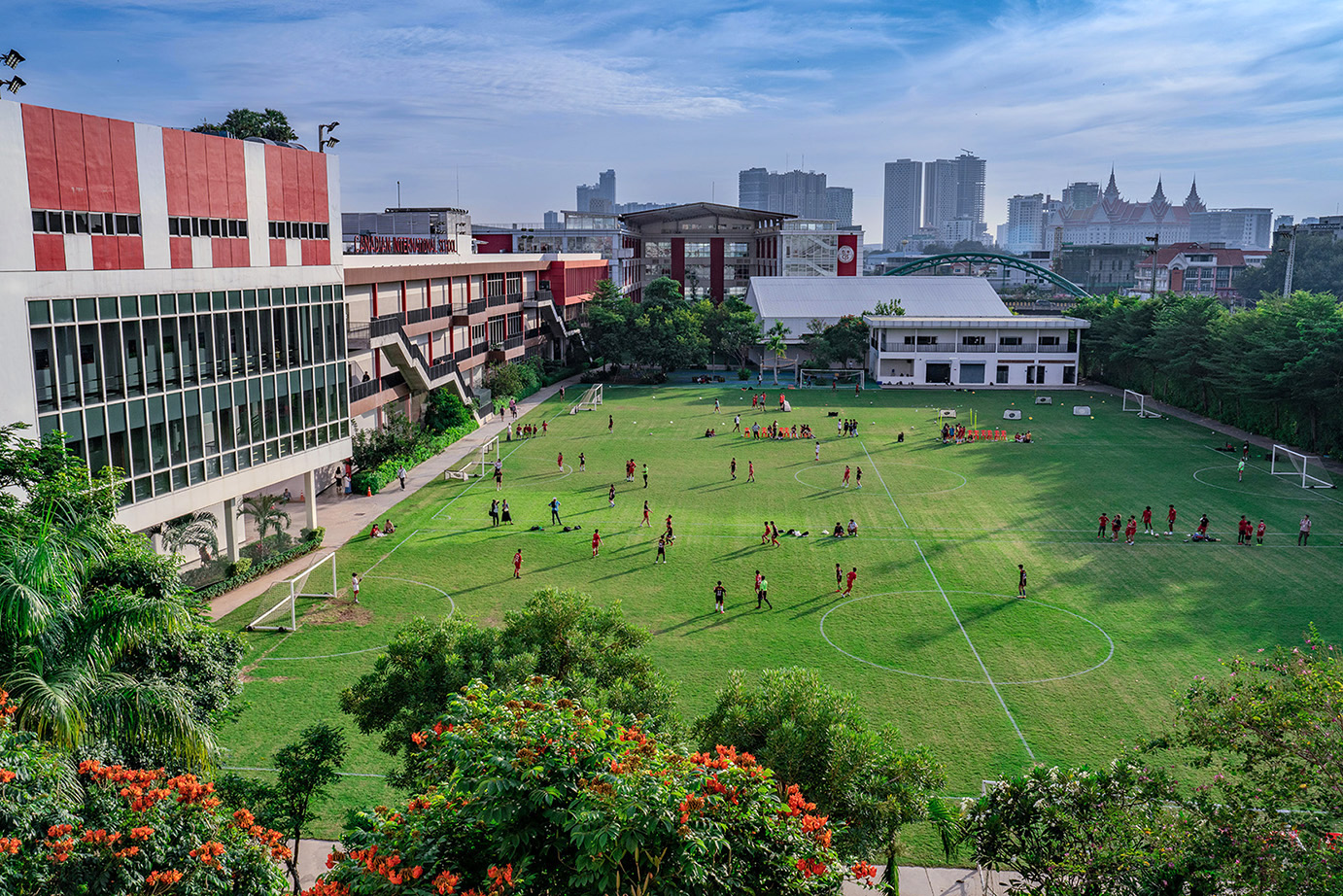
- CIS campus in Koh Pich

Location
- Koh Pich; Chamkar Mon; Phnom Penh, Cambodia, 120101; Cambodia; 11°32′46.33″N 104°56′09.39″E

Information
- Type: Private school, International school
- Motto: Empowering global citizens
- Founded: 2012
- Head of school: Daun Yorke
- Grades: Nursery - Grade 12
- Enrollment: 1,000+
- Athletics: CIS Bears
- Accreditation: International Baccalaureate, Council of International Schools, Alberta Education
- Website: https://www.cisp.edu.kh/

Canadian International School of Phnom Penh (CIS; Khmer: សាលាអន្តរជាតិកាណាដា, romanized: Sala Ǎntărăchiat Kanada) is a private international school in Phnom Penh, Cambodia, serving students from early years through Grade 12.

Established in 2012, the school operates its main campus on Koh Pich and an early years campus at Bassac Garden. CIS offers two academic pathways: the International Baccalaureate (IB) and the Alberta Education curriculum from Canada.

== Enrollment and Student Body ==
Canadian International School of Phnom Penh (CIS) serves nearly 1,000 students from early years through Grade 12 and has a multinational student community with more than 36 nationalities, and with families from a wide range of national backgrounds.

== Languages and Program ==
Instruction at CIS is primarily delivered in English, with additional language learning opportunities. The school has also introduced bilingual and language-focused offerings, including French and Mandarin programs, supporting multilingual education for both local and international students.

== Facilities and Student Life ==
CIS provides a range of academic and co-curricular facilities across its campuses. Facilities referenced in school materials include libraries, makerspaces, specialist spaces for visual arts and music, and sports infrastructure such as a natural grass football field, a short-course swimming pool, and indoor gymnasiums. The school also offers extracurricular activities and student programs, including clubs and athletics.

The school includes a theatre that hosts recurring events, including TEDx conferences and cultural programming in partnership with institutions such as the Institut français.
