= Overseas Cambodian Investment Corporation =

Privately-held holding company for the non-financial interests of Canadia Group

Overseas Cambodian Investment Corporation Ltd.
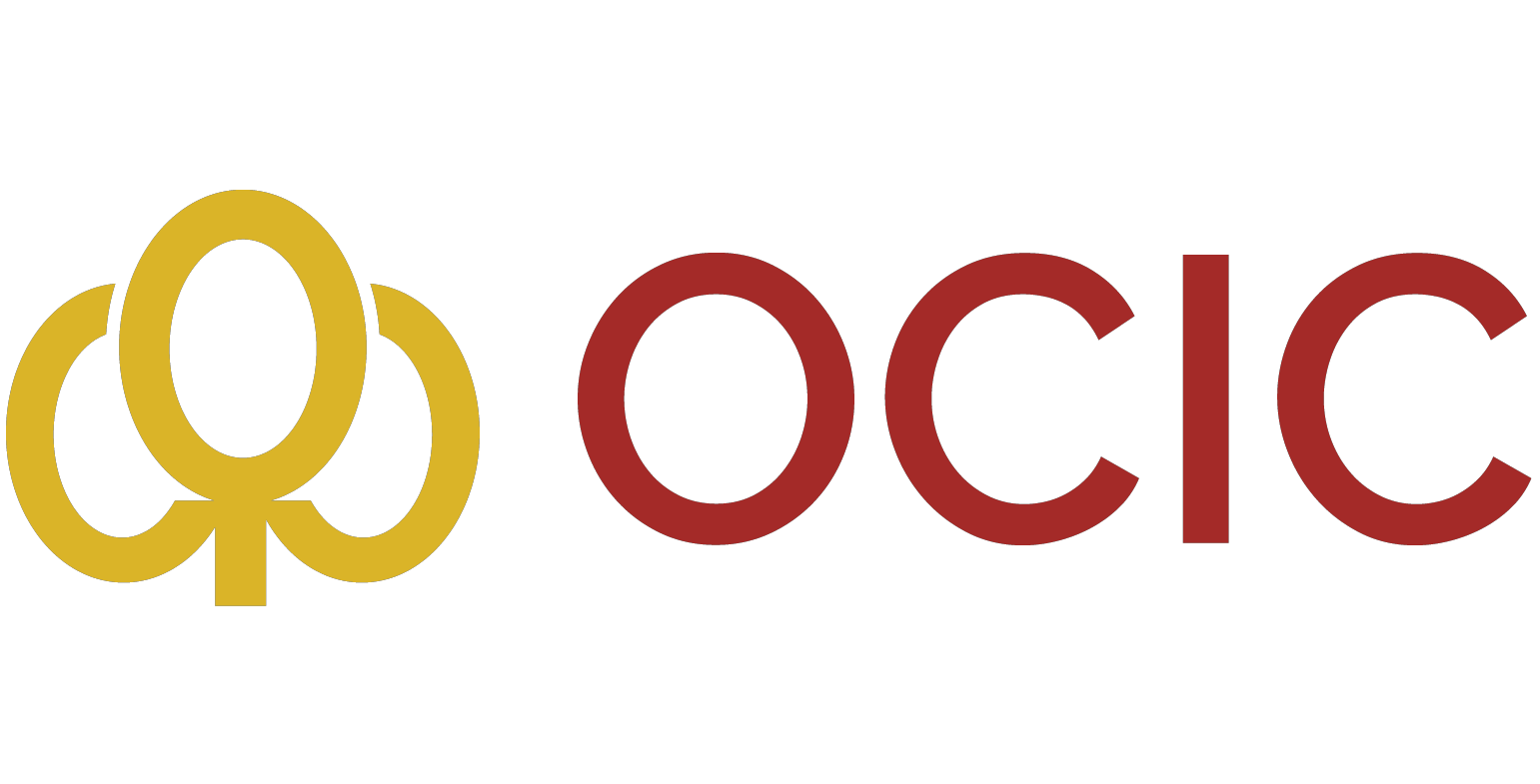

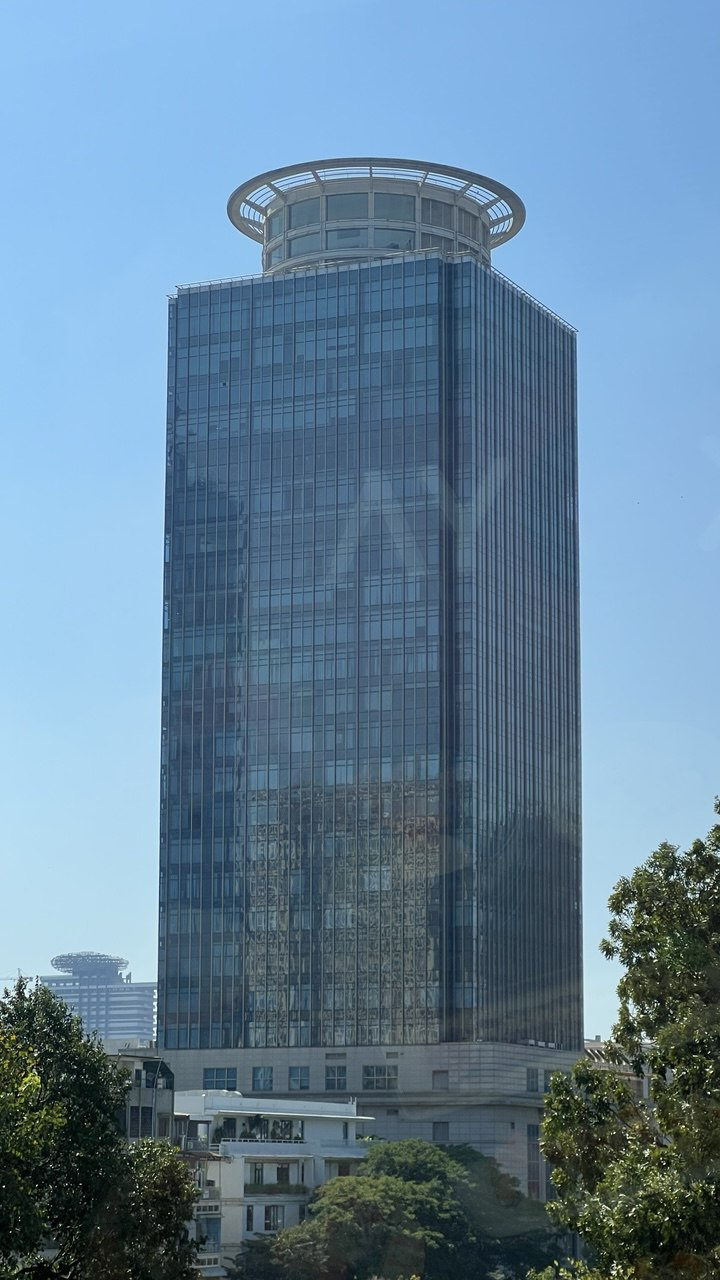
- Canadia Tower, site of the headquarters of OCIC
- Native name: ក្រុមហ៊ុន អូវើស៊ី ខេមបូឌាន អ៊ិនវេសមេន ខបភើរេសិន
- Type: Private
- Industry: Conglomerate
- Founded: 31 March 2000; 26 years ago
- Founder: Pung Kheav Se
- Headquarters: Canadia Tower, Ang Duong Street, cor. Monivong Blvd, Phnom Penh, Cambodia
- Area served: Cambodia, Laos, Hong Kong
- Key people: Pung Kheav Se (Chairman & CEO)
- Number of employees: 11,000 (2025)
- Parent: Canadia Group
- Subsidiaries: List: Cambodia Airport Investment Co. Ltd. (90%)
- Website: www.ocic.com.kh

Overseas Cambodian Investment Corporation Ltd., (OCIC; Khmer: ក្រុមហ៊ុន អូវើស៊ី ខេមបូឌាន អ៊ិនវេសមេន ខបភើរេសិន) is a Cambodian family-owned conglomerate founded in 2000 by businessman Pung Kheav Se.

The company operates in real estate development, construction, infrastructure, education, and healthcare, and is one of the major private developers in Cambodia.

OCIC is known for large urban projects such as Koh Pich, Chroy Changvar Bay, and Norea City, as well as its role through its subsidiary Cambodia Airport Investment Co. Ltd. (CAIC) as the developer of Techo International Airport, Phnom Penh’s international airport.

== History ==
Under the leadership of its founder, OCIC was established as the non-financial arm of Canadia Group, created to lead the group’s investments and operations in real estate and large-scale urban development from the early 2000s onward.

During this period, the group launched several housing projects in Phnom Penh, particularly borey developments such as Chamkarmon City and Rose Garden while also participating in early commercial and retail developments including Sorya Center Point (opened in 2003). OCIC later entered into international cooperation for selected developments, including a partnership with Malaysia’s Sunway Group for the Sunway Toul Kork residential development.

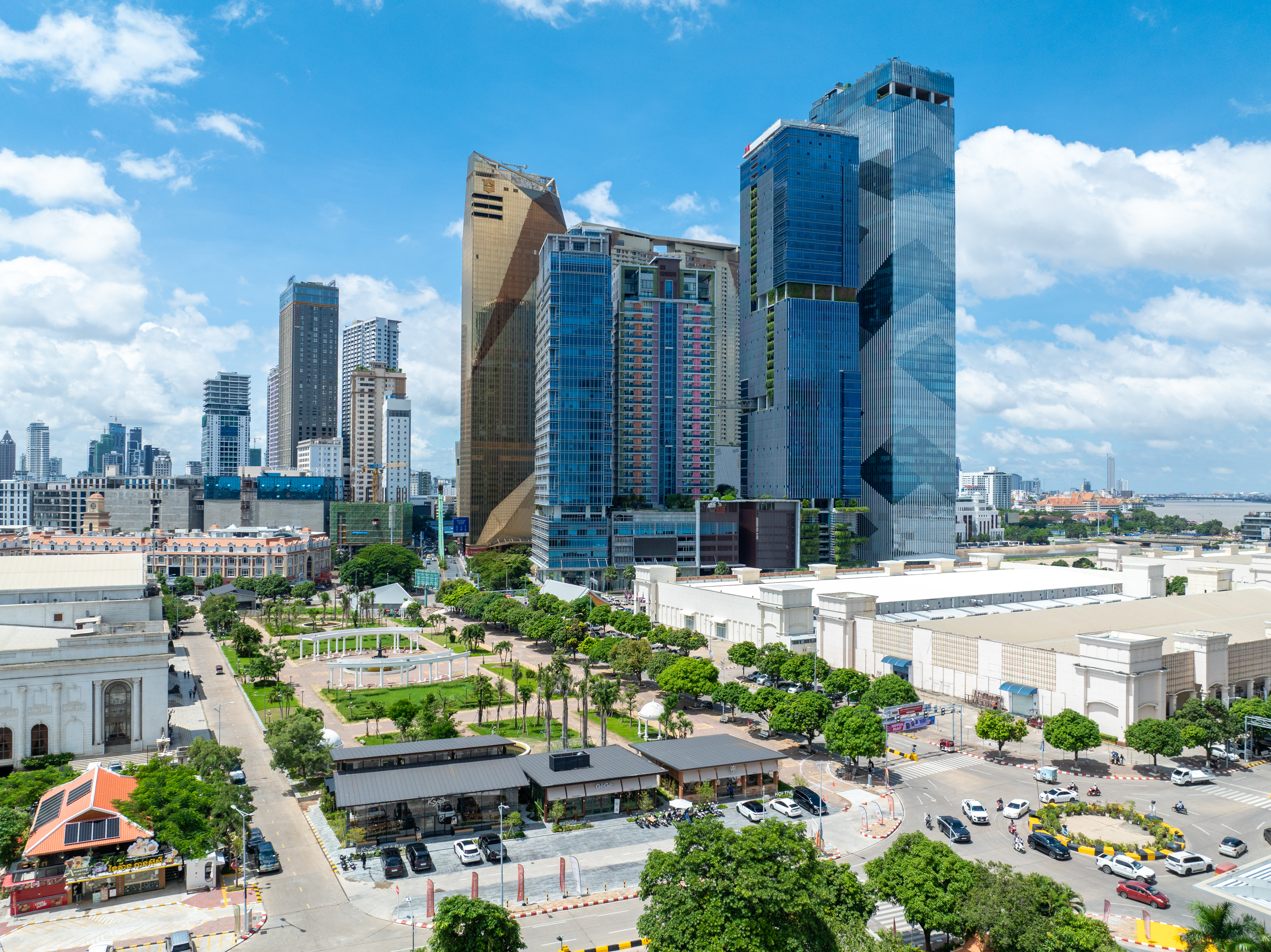
Skyscrapers on Koh Pich

From the mid-2000s onward, OCIC increased its focus on large-scale district-making and landmark projects, including the start of Koh Pich development in 2006, followed by major office and mixed-use assets such as Canadia Tower (completed in 2009). In the following decade, the group diversified into additional sectors, notably education with the establishment of the Canadian International School of Phnom Penh in 2012, and healthcare through Intercare Hospital (established in 2020).

Techo International Airport

In infrastructure, OCIC is one of Cambodia’s major private developers of roads and bridges, delivering a range of large public works projects across the country. OCIC has also played a central role through its subsidiary Cambodia Airport Investment Co., Ltd. (CAIC) as the developer of Techo International Airport, which opened in 2025, under a joint venture structure where OCIC holds 90% and the State Secretariat of Civil Aviation (SSCA) holds 10%.

== Affiliated companies and investments ==
=== Infrastructure ===
- Techo International Airport
- The company has participated in the construction of numerous roads, bridges, and flyovers throughout Cambodia.

=== Urban development ===
- Koh Pich
- Chroy Changvar Bay
- Olympia City
- Norea City
- TIA City

=== Property development ===
OCIC has developed multiple real estate projects in Cambodia, including residential and commercial developments.

=== Education ===
- Canadian International School of Phnom Penh
- École Française Internationale de Phnom Penh
- CamTech University
- Aspen Learning Academy
- Norea International School

=== Healthcare ===
- Intercare Hospital

=== Hospitality ===
- Dara Hotels
- Independence Hotel
- Angkor Green Gardens
