= Canadia Group =

Cambodian conglomerate

Canadia Integrated Group Co., Ltd.
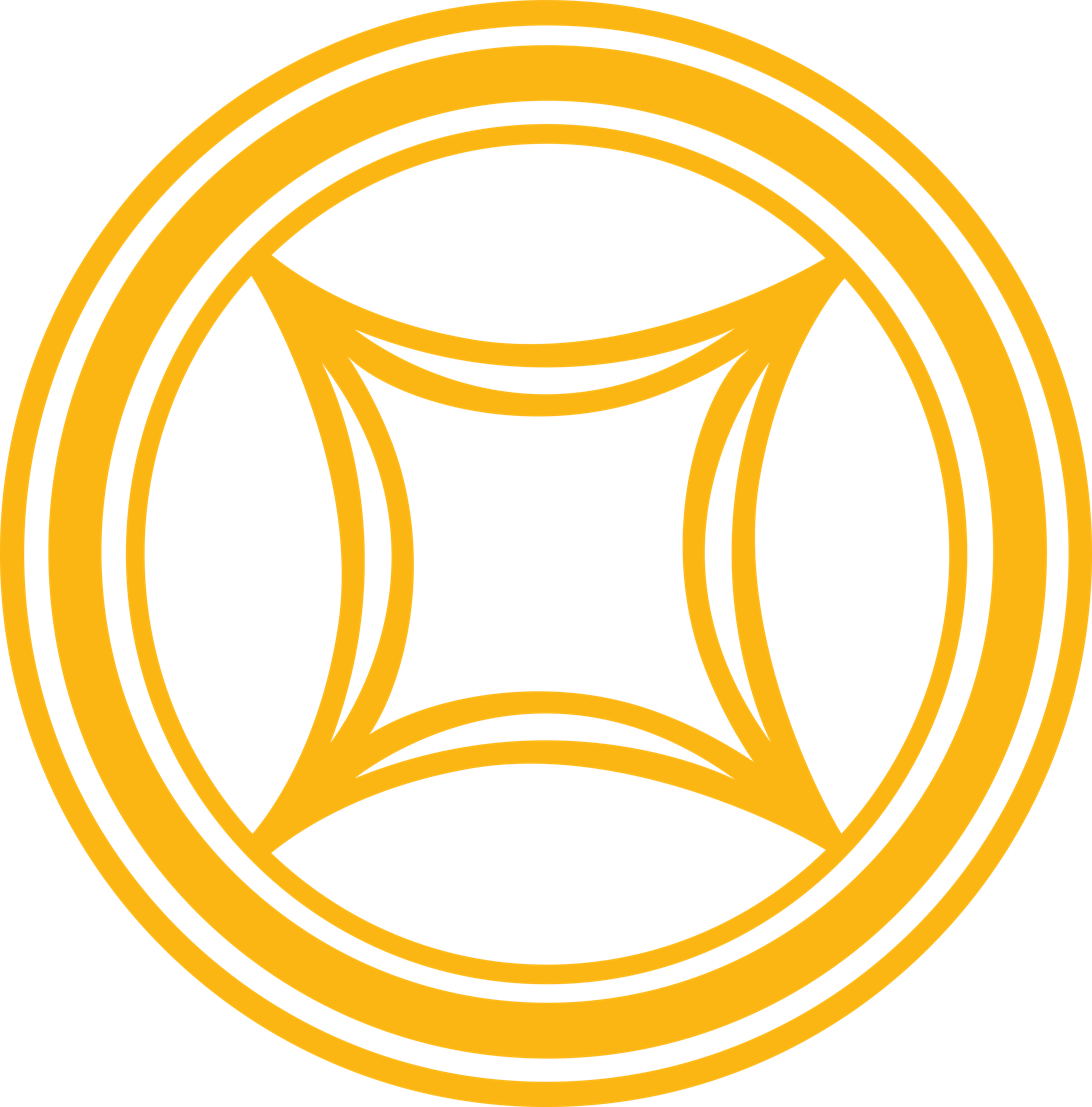

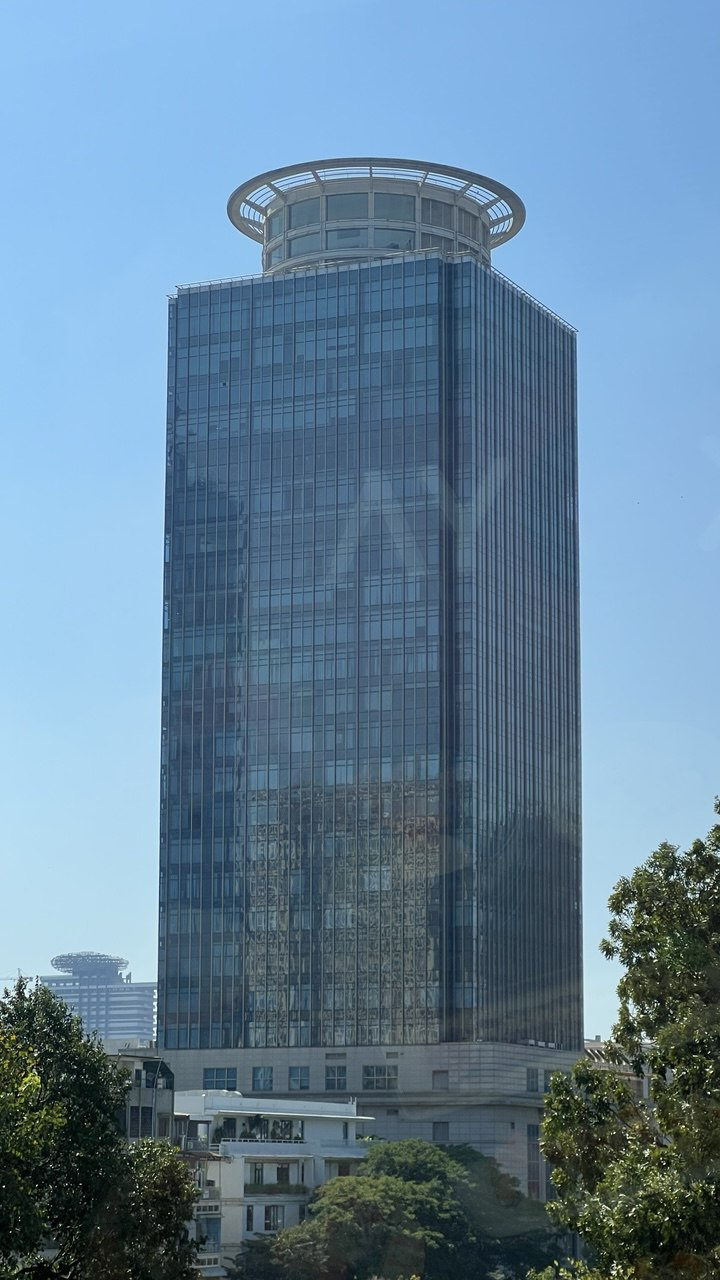
- Canadia Group headquarters at Monivong Boulevard in Phnom Penh
- Native name: ក្រុមហ៊ុន កាណាឌីយ៉ា អុីនធើហ្រ្គេធីត គ្រុប
- Company type: Private
- Industry: Conglomerate
- Founded: 1991; 35 years ago
- Founder: Pung Kheav Se
- Headquarters: Canadia Tower, Ang Duong Street, cor. Monivong Blvd, Phnom Penh, Cambodia
- Area served: Cambodia, Laos, Hong Kong
- Key people: Pung Kheav Se (Chairman); Pung Carolyne (Vice Chairperson)
- Products: Property, banking, aviation, healthcare, education, agriculture, construction, hospitality, retail, and distribution
- Number of employees: 18,000+ (2025)
- Subsidiaries: Overseas Cambodian Investment Corporation; Canadia Investment Holding
- Website: www.canadiagroup.com

Canadia Group or Canadia Integrated Group Co., Ltd. (Khmer: ក្រុមហ៊ុន កាណាឌីយ៉ា អុីនធើហ្រ្គេធីត គ្រុប) is a diversified Cambodian conglomerate headquartered in Phnom Penh. It was founded and chaired by businessman Pung Kheav Se.

Through its two main entities, Overseas Cambodian Investment Corporation (OCIC) and Canadia Investment Holding (CIH) (the parent of Canadia Bank), the group operates across banking and financial services, real estate development, and major infrastructure projects in Cambodia.

== See also ==
- List of Cambodian companies
- Pung Kheav Se
- Overseas Cambodian Investment Corporation
- Canadia Bank
- Techo International Airport
