= Koh Pich =

Satellite city in Phnom Penh

Koh Pich កោះពេជ្រ
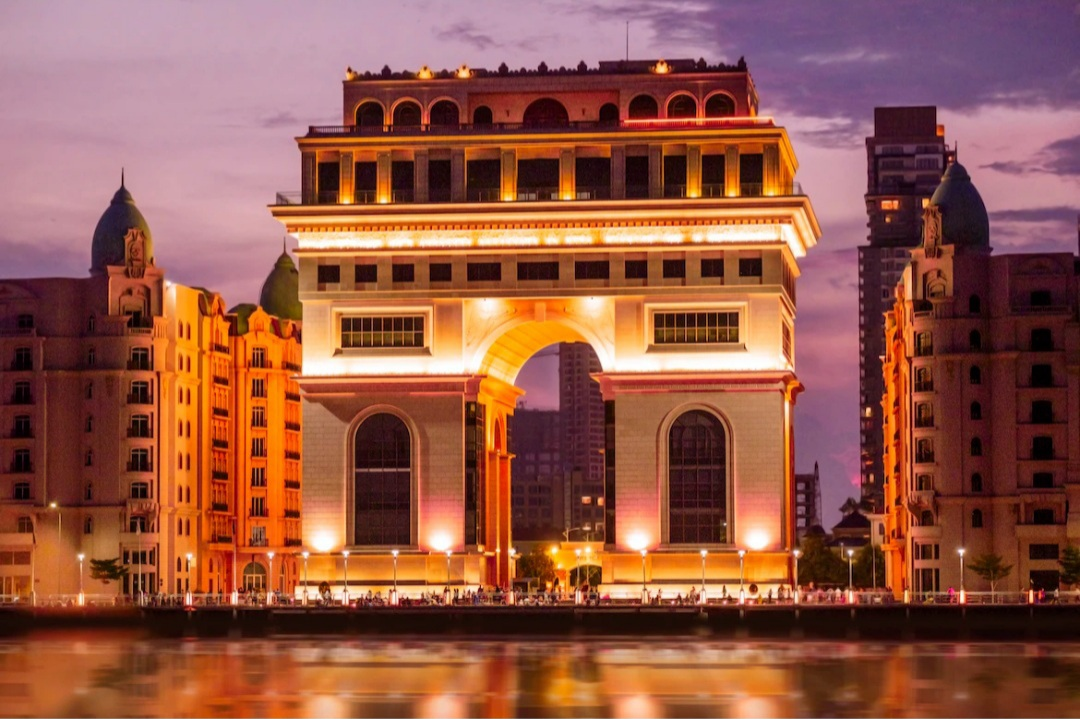
- Aerial view of Koh Pich looking west
- Interactive map of Koh Pich
- Country: Cambodia
- City: Phnom Penh
- District: Chamkar Mon

Area
  - Total: 100 ha (250 acres)
- Website: www.kohpichcity.com

Koh Pich (Khmer: កោះពេជ្រ, Kǎh Pech [kɑh peic]; English: Diamond Island) is a 100-hectare island and a mixed-use estate and central business district in Phnom Penh, Cambodia. It lies in the Tonlé Bassac River near Chaktomuk (the “Four Arms” junction), where the Mekong and Tonlé Sap rivers meet and the Bassac River branches off; it forms part of Chamkar Mon District and faces Koh Norea across the river.

Development began in 2006, when OCIC, the developer of Koh Pich, launched the project and transformed the former swamp area into a planned urban district. Koh Pich has since developed into a major concentration of residential, commercial, hospitality, and event uses, including high-rise projects, offices, retail spaces, and exhibition and convention facilities.

== History ==
=== First settlements ===
Koh Pich was formed due to the buildup of slit from the changing river flows of the Bassac and Mekong river, creating a 800-meter wide island.

In the early 2000s, the area was a swamp land with a small community of fishing families settled on the island.

By 2004, the Government of Cambodia gave permission to a local conglomerate, Overseas Cambodian Investment Corporation (OCIC Group), to develop the island into a commercial and residential hub.

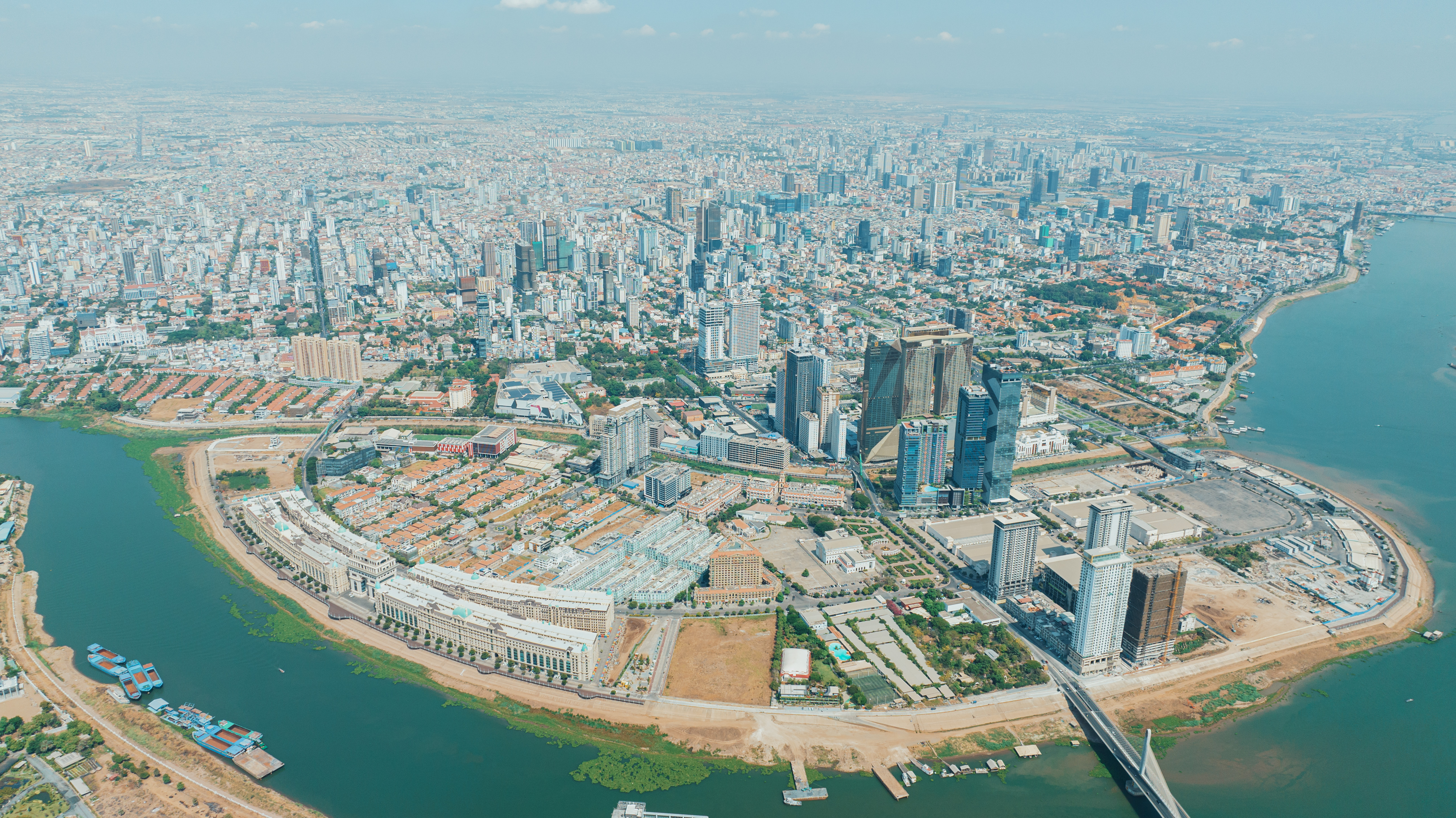
Drone view of Koh Pich and downtown Phnom Penh

== Education ==
The Canadian International School of Phnom Penh has its main campus in Koh Pich; this campus opened in 2015.

The EFI (Ecole Française Internationale) is a French international school that opened in 2016. It is located in Koh Pich, where it shares a campus with the Canadian International School of Phnom Penh.

De Montfort University is the first British university to open its campus in Cambodia, it opened its doors in 2024, with its main campus in Koh Pich.

== Skyline ==
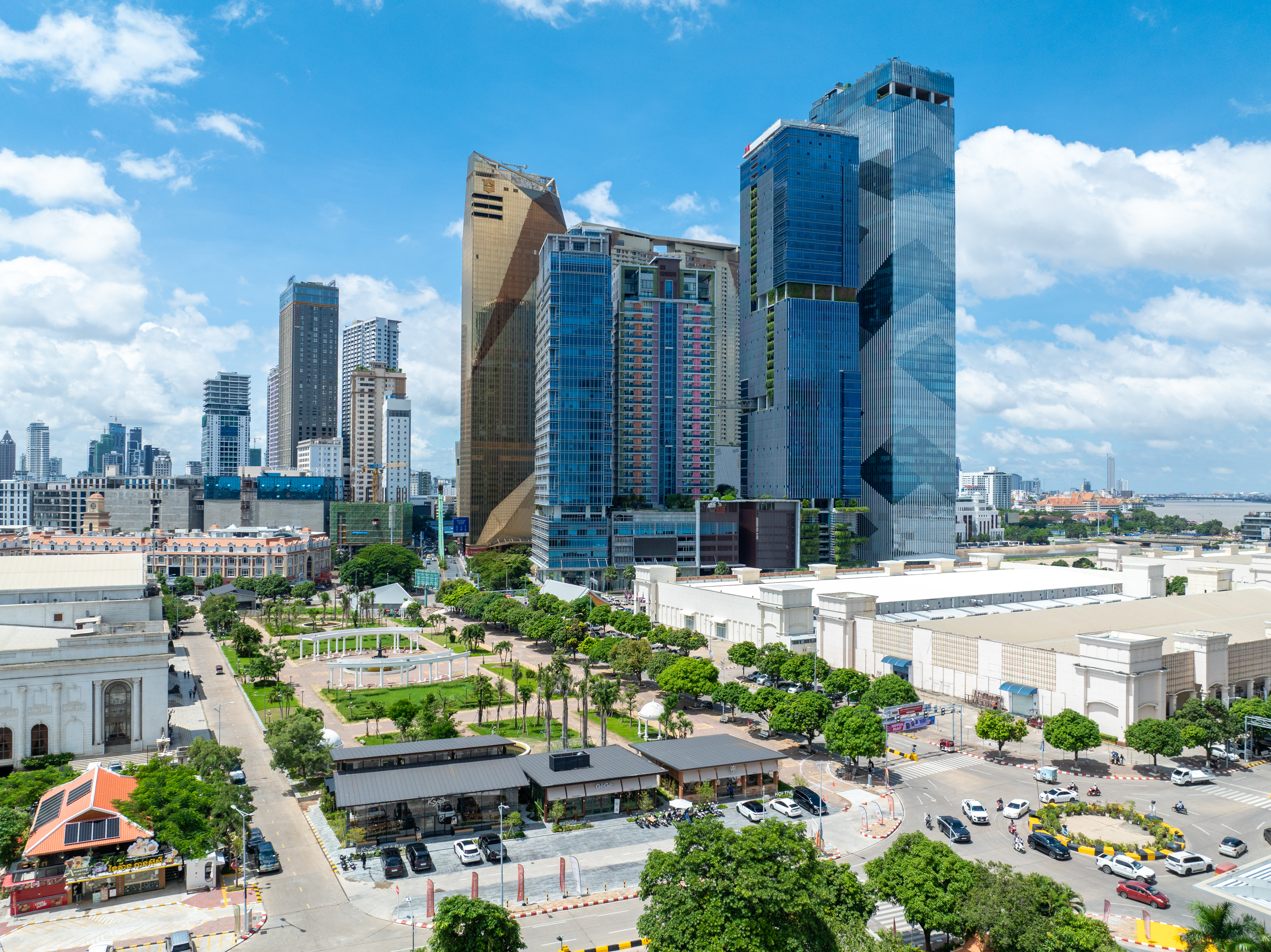
Skyscrapers in Koh Pich

Today, Koh Pich hosts some of Phnom Penh’s tallest buildings such as the GIA tower, Diamond Bay Garden, Diamond Twin Tower, Morgan tower and Casa By Meridian.

== Parks and Green Spaces ==
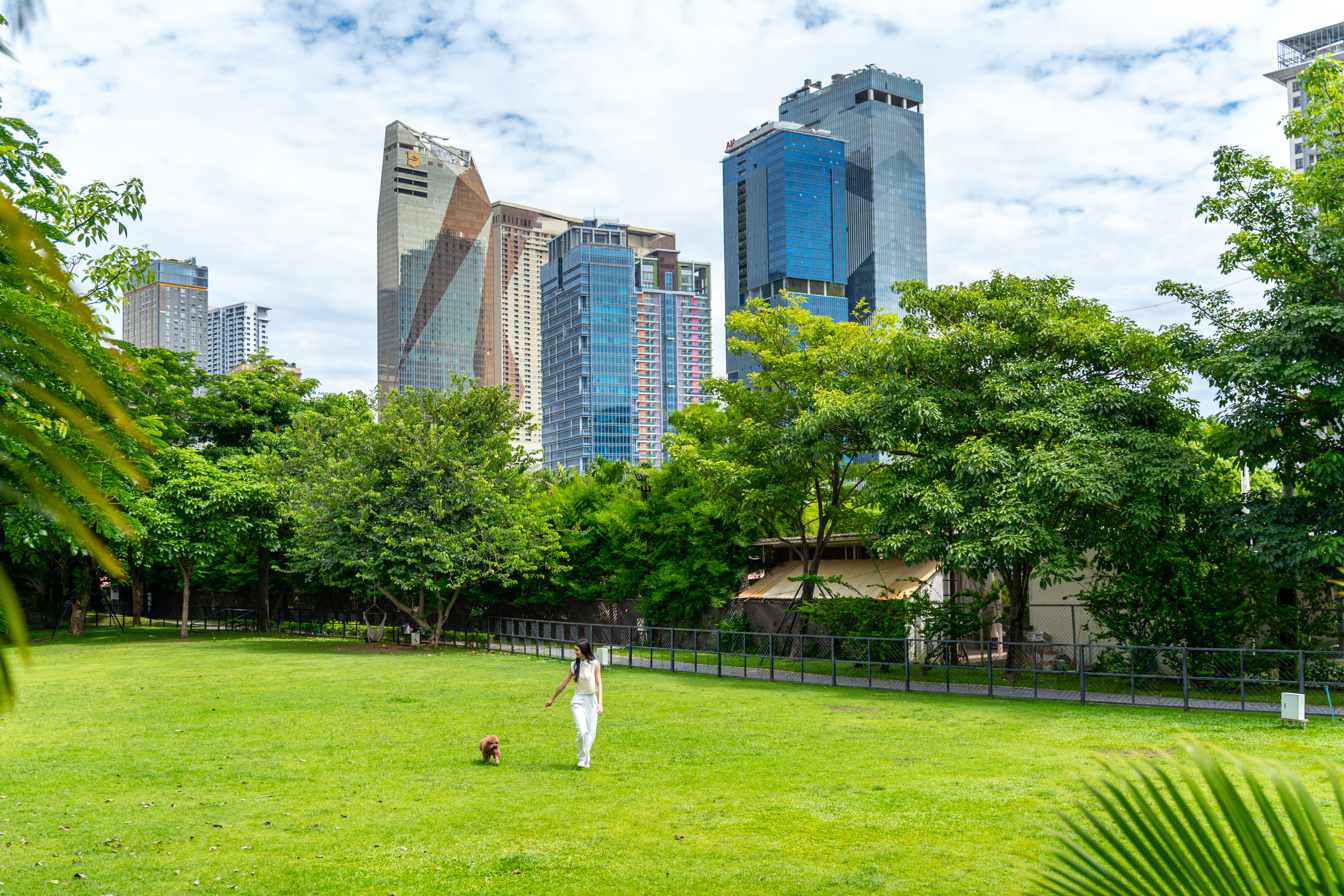
Coconut Park

Koh Pich includes several landscaped public green areas, including Coconut Park, Treellion Park, and Elysée Garden, which contribute to the district’s recreational spaces and pedestrian environment.

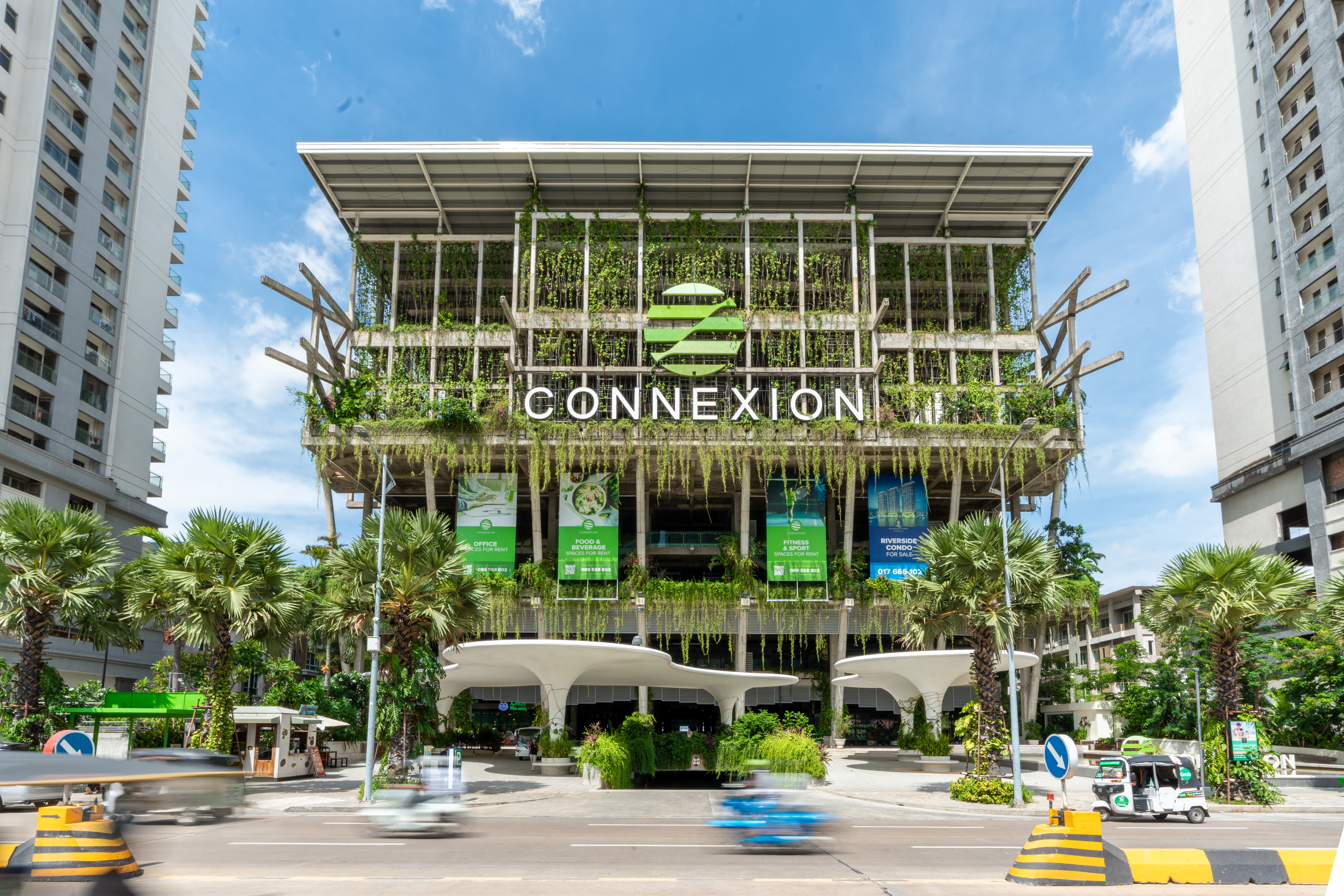
Connexion, a sustainable hub for startups

Koh Pich also hosts developments positioned around sustainability and urban reuse. Connexion is a mixed-use innovative hub designed to accommodate offices, retail and community facilities, and has been described as part of an adaptive re-use approach. The district also includes Aquation Office Park, a low-rise, eco-oriented office complex located near the river and integrated with public green space around Treellion Park.

== Gallery ==
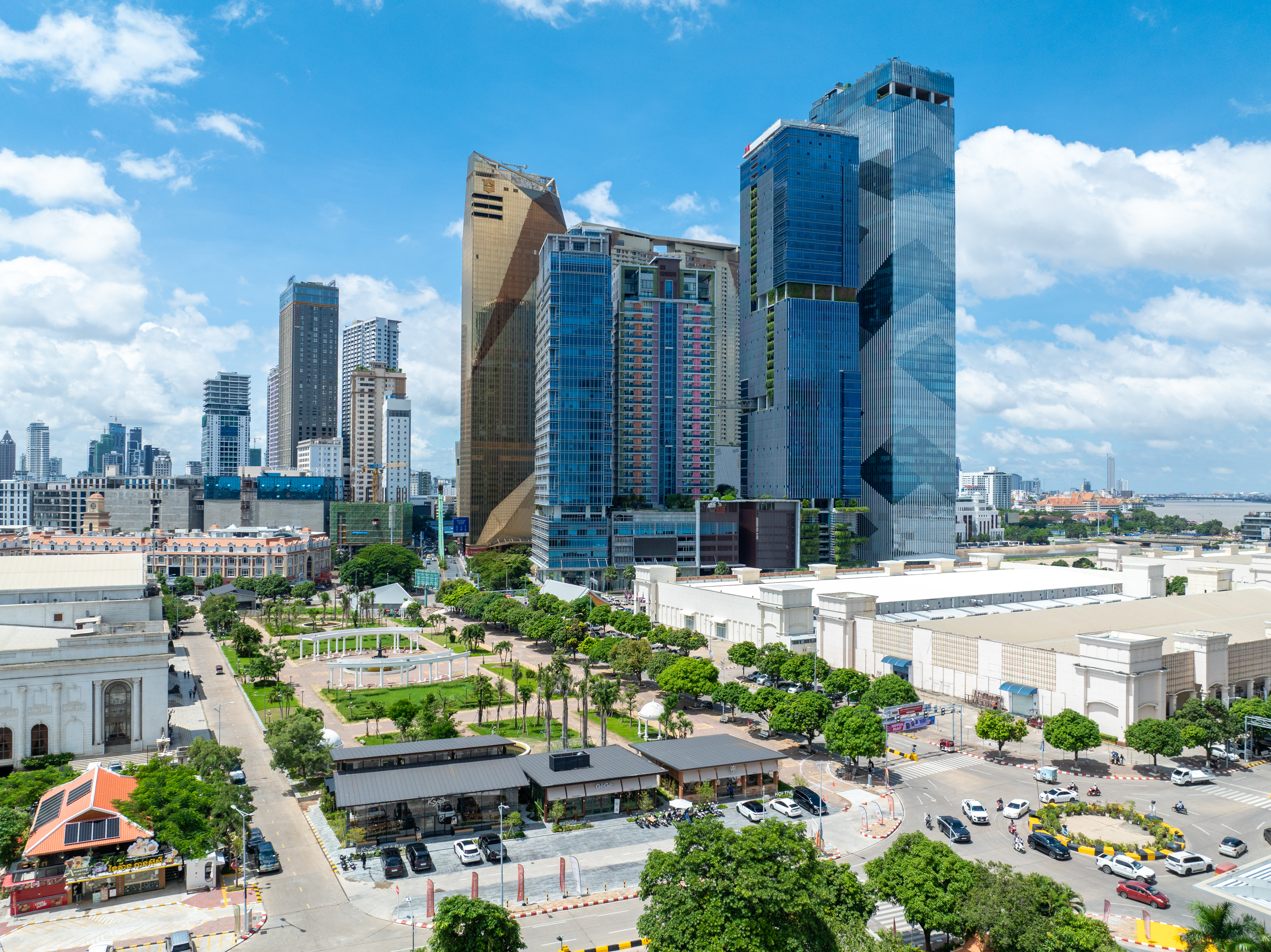

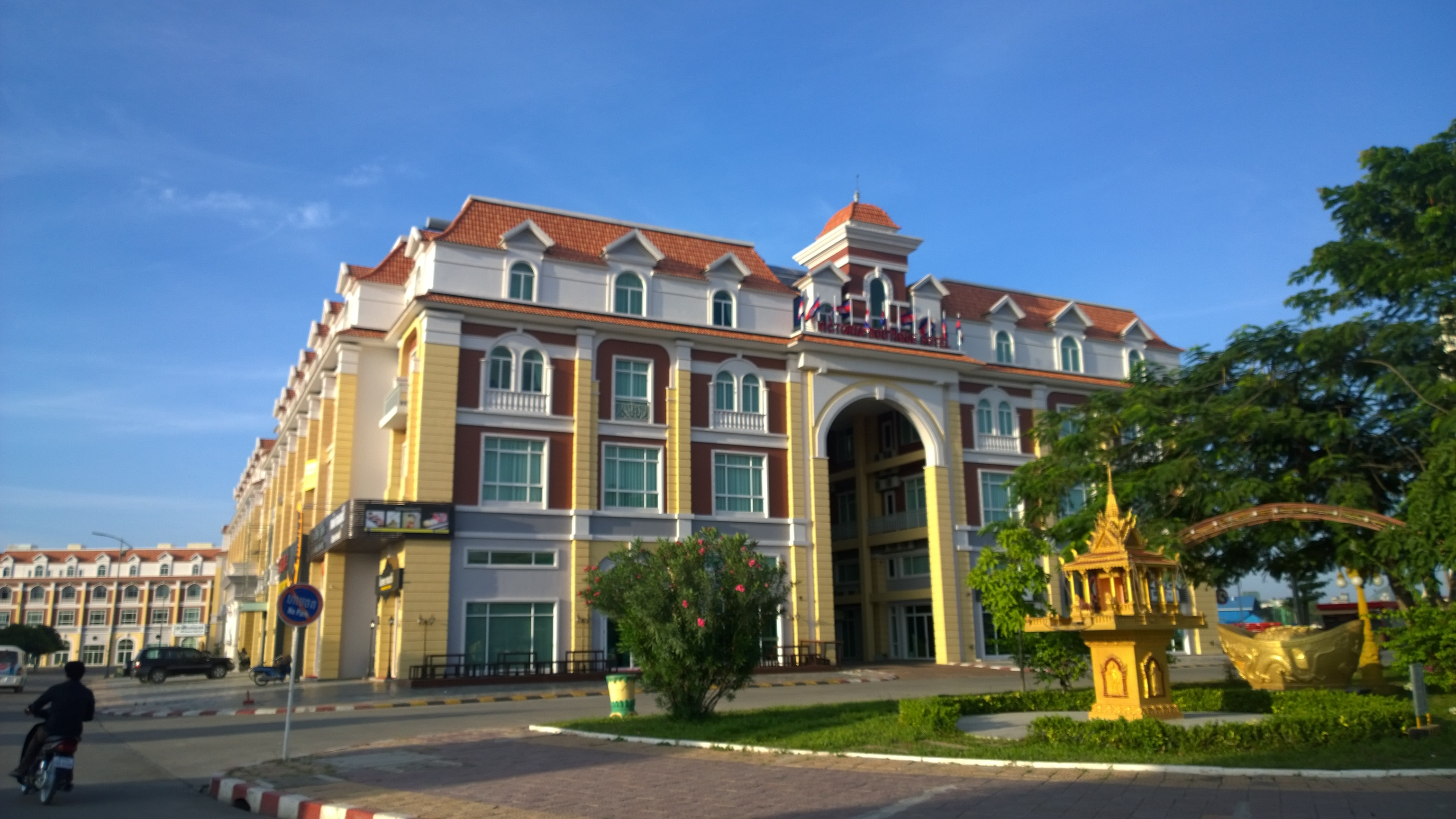

== The 2010 accident ==
The Phnom Penh stampede was a deadly stampede that occurred during the Water Festival at Diamond Island in Cambodia. It resulted in 347 people being killed and at least 755 being injured.
