= Chakraval Daily =

Cambodian newspaper

Chakraval Daily is a Khmer language newspaper published in Cambodia with its headquarters in Phnom Penh.
