= Udomkate Khmer =

Khmer language newspaper published in Cambodia

Udomkate Khmer (Khmer Ideal) is a Khmer language newspaper published in Cambodia with its headquarters in Phnom Penh.

Around the time of the National Assembly elections in 2003, Udomkate Khmer shifted its support to FUNCINPEC. Since that shift, the owner of the paper is reported to have obtained a senior government position.
