= Seal of Phnom Penh =

The Seal of Phnom Penh is the municipal seal used by the City Hall of Phnom Penh.

== Symbolism and description ==
=== Description ===
The seal is round with navy-blue rings. The trees, bridge, and temple (Wat Phnom) are also navy-blue.

=== Symbolism ===
The palm tree (Khmer: ដើមត្នោត, Daeum Tnaôt) represents Cambodia and the other trees represent nature. Wat Phnom (វត្តភ្នំ, lit. "Mountain Pagoda") and Spean Neak (ស្ពាននាគ, lit. "Dragon Bridge") represent Phnom Penh.
