= Kanychok Sangkhum =

Khmer language newspaper published in Cambodia with its headquarters in Phnom Penh

Kanychok Sangkhum is a Khmer language newspaper published in Cambodia with its headquarters in Phnom Penh.
