= Phnom Penh =

Capital of Cambodia

Phnom Penh ភ្នំពេញ
- Capital city and autonomous municipality
- Phnom Penh Capital; រាជធានីភ្នំពេញ
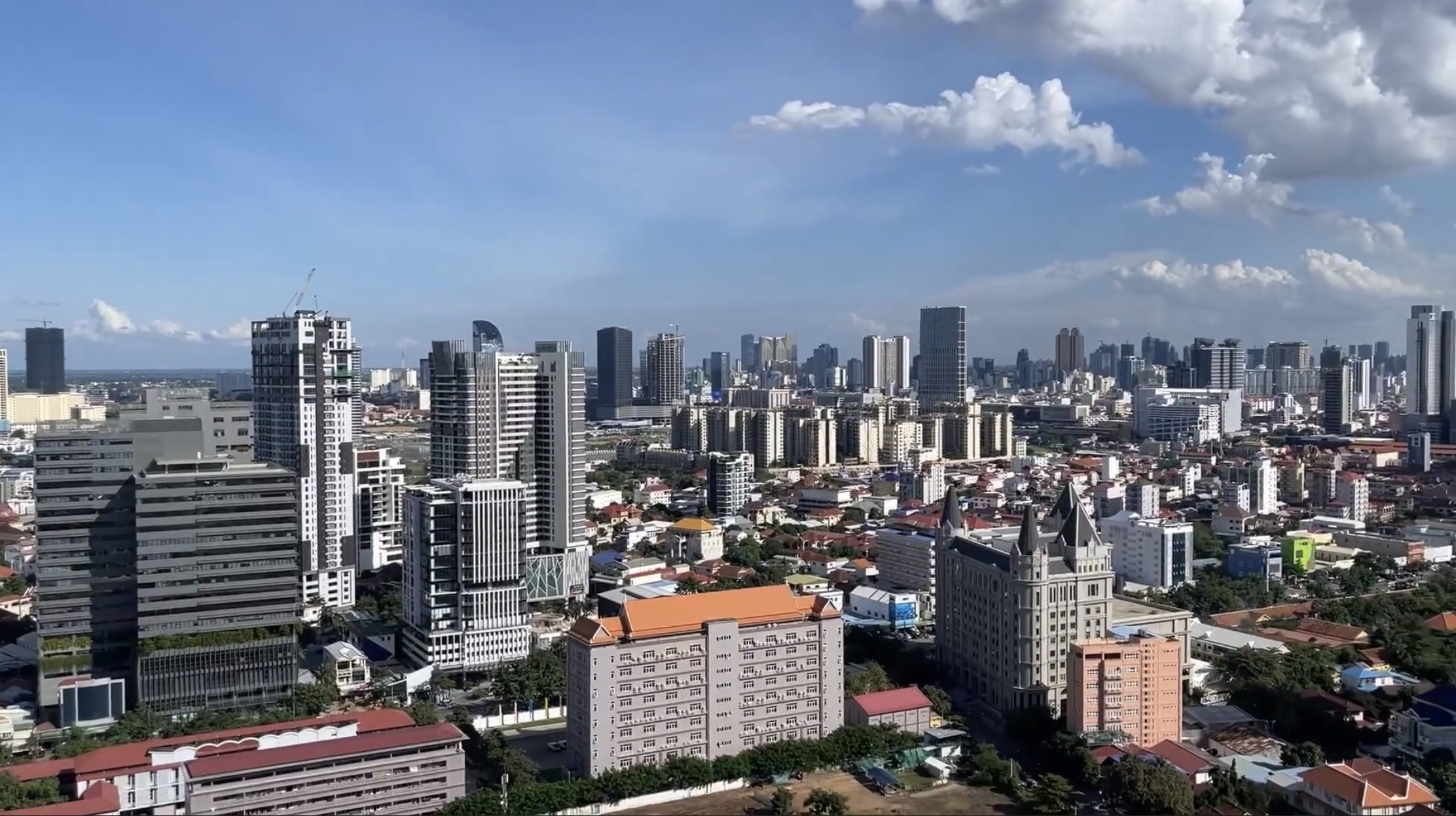
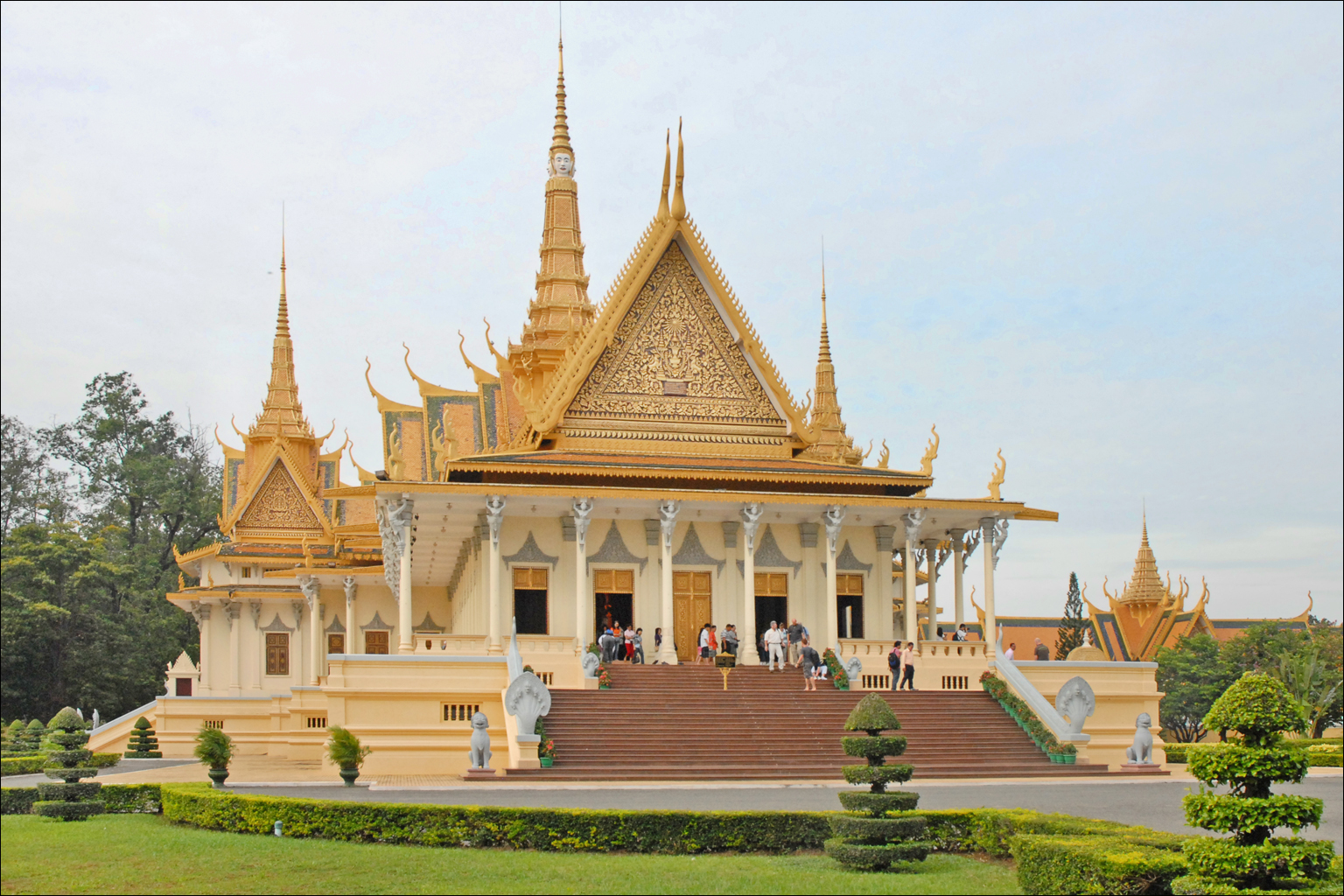
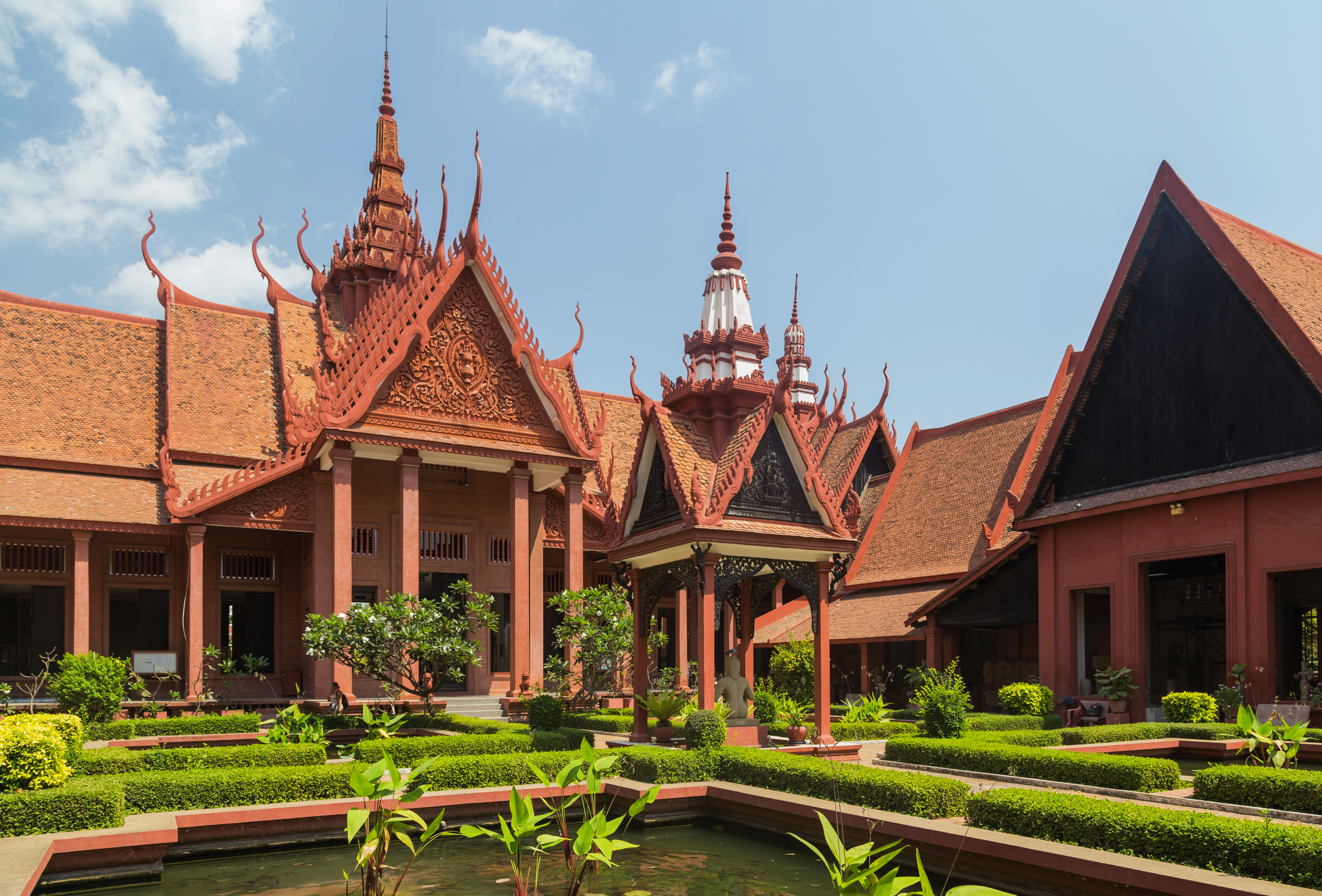
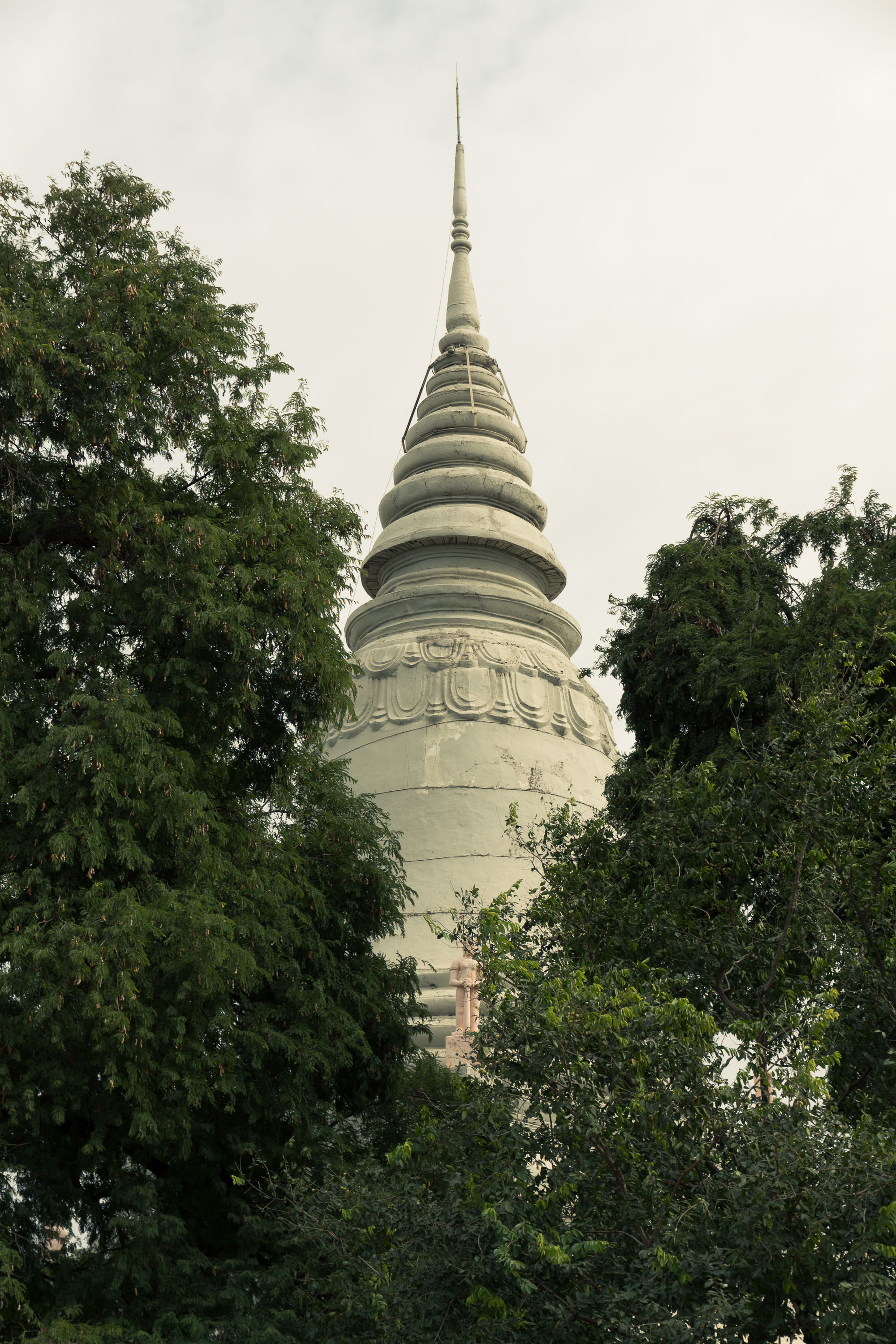
- Skyline of Phnom Penh Independence Monument Royal Palace of Cambodia National Museum of Cambodia Wat Phnom

- Seal
- Interactive map of Phnom Penh
- Location within Cambodia Location within Asia
- Coordinates: 11°34′10″N 104°55′16″E
- Country: Cambodia
- Settled: 5th century
- Founded: 1372
- Capital status: 1434–1497
- Capital re-established: 1865
- Named for: Wat Phnom and Lady Penh
- Subdivisions: 14 khans

Government
  - Type: Municipal council
  - Governor: Khuong Sreng (CPP)
  - National Assembly: 12 / 125

Area
  - Capital city and autonomous municipality: 679 km^{2} (262 sq mi)
  - Metro: 3,858 km^{2} (1,490 sq mi)
  - Rank: 24th
- Elevation: 11.89 m (39.0 ft)

Population (2019 census)
  - Capital city and autonomous municipality: ▲2,352,851
  - Rank: 1st
  - Density: 3,361/km^{2} (8,700/sq mi)
  - Rank: 1st
  - Metro: 3,483,532
- Demonyms: Phnom Penher; (French: Phnom Penhois(e))
- Time zone: UTC+07:00 (ICT)
- Area code: +999 (07203)
- HDI (2023): 0.702; high · 1st
- Website: phnompenh.gov.kh

Phnom Penh (Note: /pəˌnɒm ˈpɛn, ˌpnɒm -/; Khmer: ភ្នំពេញ, Phnum Pénh; [pʰnomˈpɨɲ], lit. 'Penh's hill') is the capital and most populous city of Cambodia. It has been the national capital since 1865 and has grown to become the nation's primate city and its political, economic, industrial, and cultural centre. The city's name derives from Wat Phnom, a Buddhist temple, and Lady Penh, the city's founder. It sits at the confluence of the Tonlé Sap and Mekong rivers, and is the start of the Bassac River. It is also the seat of Cambodia's monarchy, based at the Royal Palace.

Founded in 1372, Phnom Penh succeeded Angkor Thom as the national capital in 1434 following the fall of Angkor, and remained so until 1497. It regained its capital status during the French colonial era. It underwent a period of investment and modernization during Cambodia's independence period, earning the nickname the "Pearl of Asia" for its colonial French, New Khmer and Art Deco architecture. The city's population swelled in the 1960s and 1970s as refugees fled from civil war and American bombing during the Vietnam War. Phnom Penh's entire population was forcibly evacuated in 1975 by the Khmer Rouge, and faced persecution, forced labour and genocide. Phnom Penh remained largely uninhabited during the Democratic Kampuchea era until Vietnam-backed forces took the city in 1979. The city was reconstructed and infrastructure improved in the modern era with the support of international investment and aid. By 2009, it was home to more than 2 million people, approximately 14% of the Cambodian population.

The Greater Phnom Penh area includes the nearby Ta Khmau city and some districts of Kandal province. The city formerly functioned as a processing center, with textiles, pharmaceuticals, machine manufacturing, and rice milling. Its cultural institutions and events have made it a hub for domestic and international tourism. The city has hosted regional and international events, including the 2002, 2012, and 2014 ASEAN Summit, the 32nd Southeast Asian Games, and the 12th ASEAN Para Games. Phnom Penh will be the first Cambodian city and the second city in Southeast Asia to host the Asian Youth Games in 2031.

== Etymology ==
Phnom Penh (lit. 'Penh's hill') takes its name from the Wat Phnom (lit. 'hill temple'), or from the Funan Kingdom, which existed from the 1st to the 7th century AD in Southeast Asia and was the forerunner of the Cambodian monarchy. Legend has it that in 1372, a wealthy widow named Penh found a Koki tree floating down the Tonlé Sap River after a storm.

Phnom Penh's former official name is Krong Chaktomuk Serei Mongkol (Khmer: ក្រុងចតុមុខសិរីមង្គល, lit. "city of Brahma's faces"), in its short form as Krong Chaktomuk (lit. 'city of four faces'). Krong Chaktomuk is an abbreviation of the full name, given to it by King Ponhea Yat: Krŏng Chătŏmŭk Mǒngkǒl Săkǎl Kămpŭchia Thĭpădei Sĕrei Theăreă Bâvâ Ĕnteăpăt Bŏrei Roăt Riach Seima Môhanôkô (Khmer: ក្រុងចតុមុខមង្គលសកលកម្ពុជាធិបតី សិរីធរបវរ ឥន្ទបត្តបុរី រដ្ឋរាជសីមាមហានគរ [kɾoŋ catomuk mɔŋkɔl sakɑl kampuciətʰəpaɗəj serəj tʰeareaɓɑːʋɑː ʔenteapat ɓorəj rɔətʰariəcsəjmaː mɔhaːnɔkɔː]). This loosely translates as "the place of four rivers that gives the happiness and success of the Khmer Kingdom, the highest leader as well as impregnable city of the God Indra of the great kingdom".

== History ==
The initial settlement of Phnom Penh is believed to have been established since the 5th century AD, according to the discovery of kiln site in Choeung Ek commune of Dangkao district, southern part of central Phnom Penh in the 2000s. Choeung Ek archaeological site was one of the largest kiln pottery center in Cambodia and the earliest known kiln sites in Southeast Asia to produce the ceremonial vessels known as kendi from 5th to 13th century. Archaeologists stated that a large community is surrounded by a circular earthwork structure that is 740 metres in diameter and 4 metres high, built in the 11th century. There are remnants of other village infrastructure, irrigation system, inscription, Shiva linga and a brick temple foundation and its ornate remains which dated back to Funan era.

First recorded a century after it is said to have taken place, the legend of the founding of Phnom Penh tells of a local woman, Penh (also referred to as Daun Penh (Lady Penh in Khmer), living at Chaktomuk, the future Phnom Penh. It was the 14th century, and the Khmer capital was still at Angkor near Siem Reap 350 km (217 mi) to the north. Gathering firewood along the banks of the river, Lady Penh spied a floating koki tree in the river and fished it from the water. Inside the tree she found four Buddha statues and one of Vishnu.

Phnom Penh from east drawn in 1887.

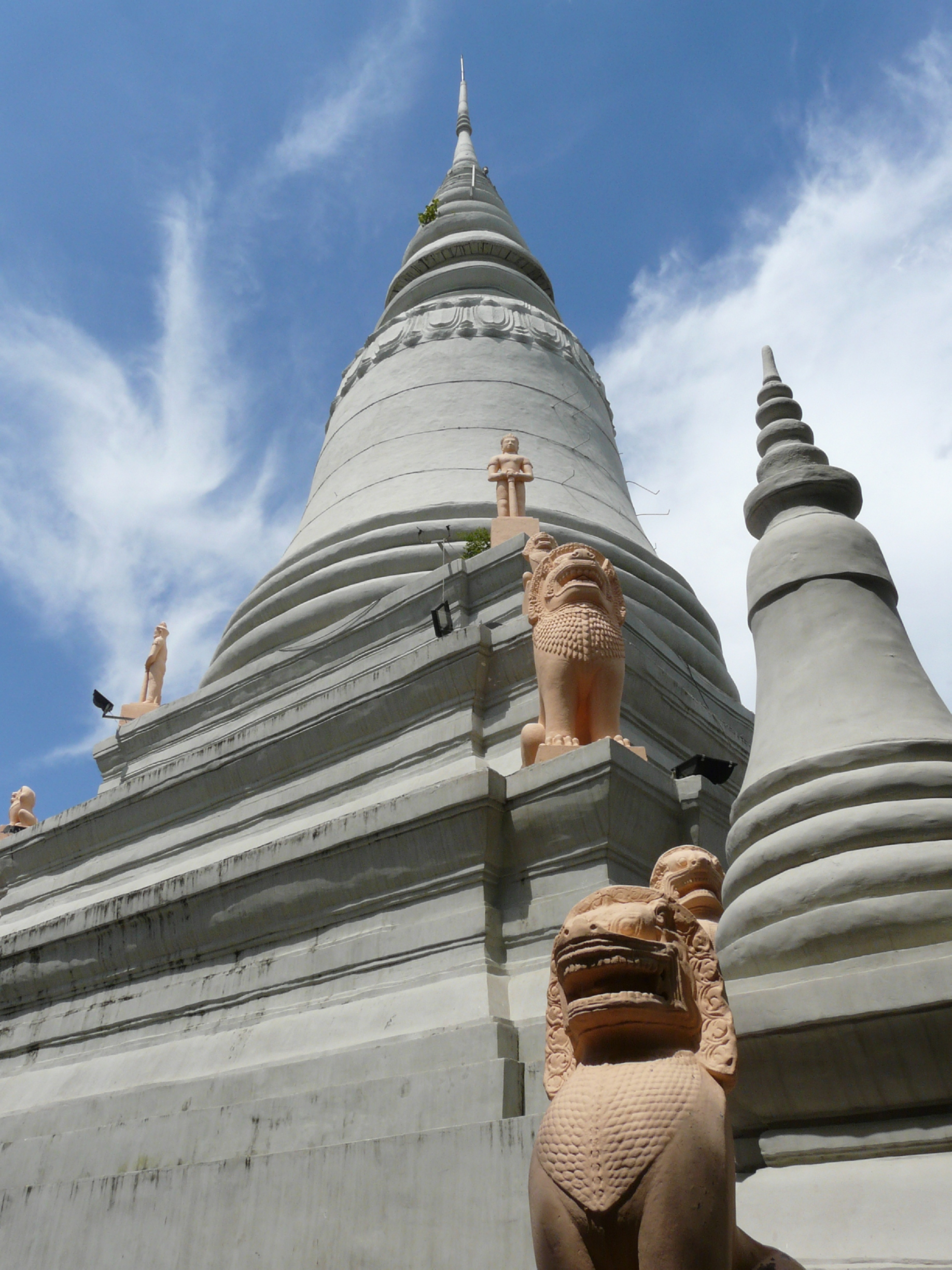
Stupa of King Ponhea Yat on the top of Wat Phnom

The discovery was taken as a divine blessing, and to some a sign that the Khmer capital was to be brought to Phnom Penh from Angkor. To house the new-found sacred objects, Penh raised a hill on the west bank of the Tonle Sap River and crowned it with a shrine, later known as Wat Phnom at the north end of central Phnom Penh. "Phnom" is Khmer for "hill" and Penh's hill took on the name of the founder, and the area around it became known after the hill.

Phnom Penh first became the capital of Cambodia after Ponhea Yat (c. 1390 – 1463), king of the Khmer Empire, moved the capital from Angkor Thom after it was captured and destroyed by Siam years earlier. There is a stupa. (Note: The stupa immediately west of the sanctuary contains the ashes of King Ponhea Yat and his royal family. This stupa is a historical site, reflecting the city's cultural heritage.) In the 17th century, Japanese immigrants settled on the outskirts of what later is Phnom Penh. A Portuguese community survived in Phnom Penh until the 17th century, undertaking commercial and religious activity in the country.

Phnom Penh remained the royal capital for 73 years, from 1432 to 1505. It was abandoned for 360 years (from 1505 to 1865) by subsequent kings due to internal fighting between the royal pretenders. Later kings moved the capital several times and established their royal capitals at locations in Tuol Basan (Srey Santhor), Pursat, Longvek, Lavear Em and Oudong. From 1673 to 1674, Phnom Penh was the stronghold of rebel king Kaev Hua II.

During the Vietnam War, Cambodia was used as a base by the People's Army of Vietnam and the Viet Cong, and thousands of refugees from across the country flooded the city to escape the fighting between their own government troops, the People's Army of Vietnam, the Viet Cong, the South Vietnamese and their allies, the Khmer Rouge, and American air strikes. By 1975, the population was 2–3 million, the bulk of whom were refugees from the fighting. The Khmer Rouge cut off supplies to the city for more than a year before it fell on 17 April 1975. Reports from journalists stated that the Khmer Rouge shelling "tortured the capital almost continuously", inflicting "random death and mutilation" on millions of trapped civilians. The Khmer Rouge forcibly evacuated the entire city after taking it, in what has been described as a death march: François Ponchaud wrote that "I shall never forget one cripple who had neither hands nor feet, writhing along the ground like a severed worm, or a weeping father carrying his ten-year old daughter wrapped in a sheet tied around his neck like a sling, or the man with his foot dangling at the end of a leg to which it was attached by nothing but skin"; Jon Swain recalled that the Khmer Rouge were "tipping out patients from the hospitals like garbage into the streets....In five years of war, this is the greatest caravan of human misery I have seen". All of its residents, including the wealthy and educated, were evacuated from the city and forced to do difficult labour on rural farms as "new people".

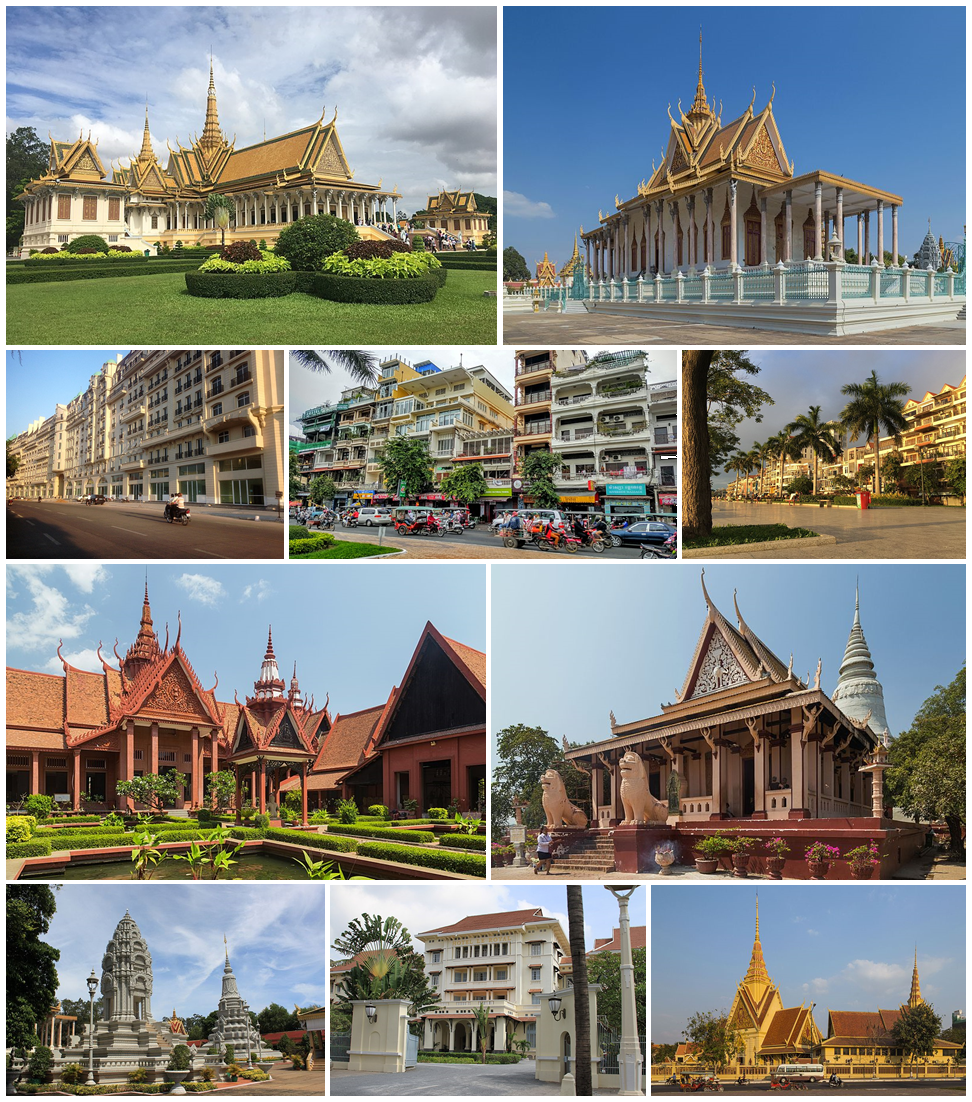
From top, left to right: Royal Throne Hall, Silver Pagoda, a street in Koh Pich, Sisowath Quay, Riverside Park, National Museum, Wat Phnom, Royal Stupas, Hotel Le Royal, Supreme Court Building

The Khmer Rouge were driven out of Phnom Penh by the People's Army of Vietnam in 1979, and people began to return to the city. A period of reconstruction began, spurred by the continuing stability of government, attracting new foreign investment and aid by countries including France, Australia, and Japan. Loans were made from the Asian Development Bank and the World Bank to reinstate a clean water supply, roads and other infrastructure. The 1998 Census put Phnom Penh's population at 862,000; and the 2008 census was 1.3 million. By 2019, its population reached over 2.2 million, based on general population census.

== Geography ==
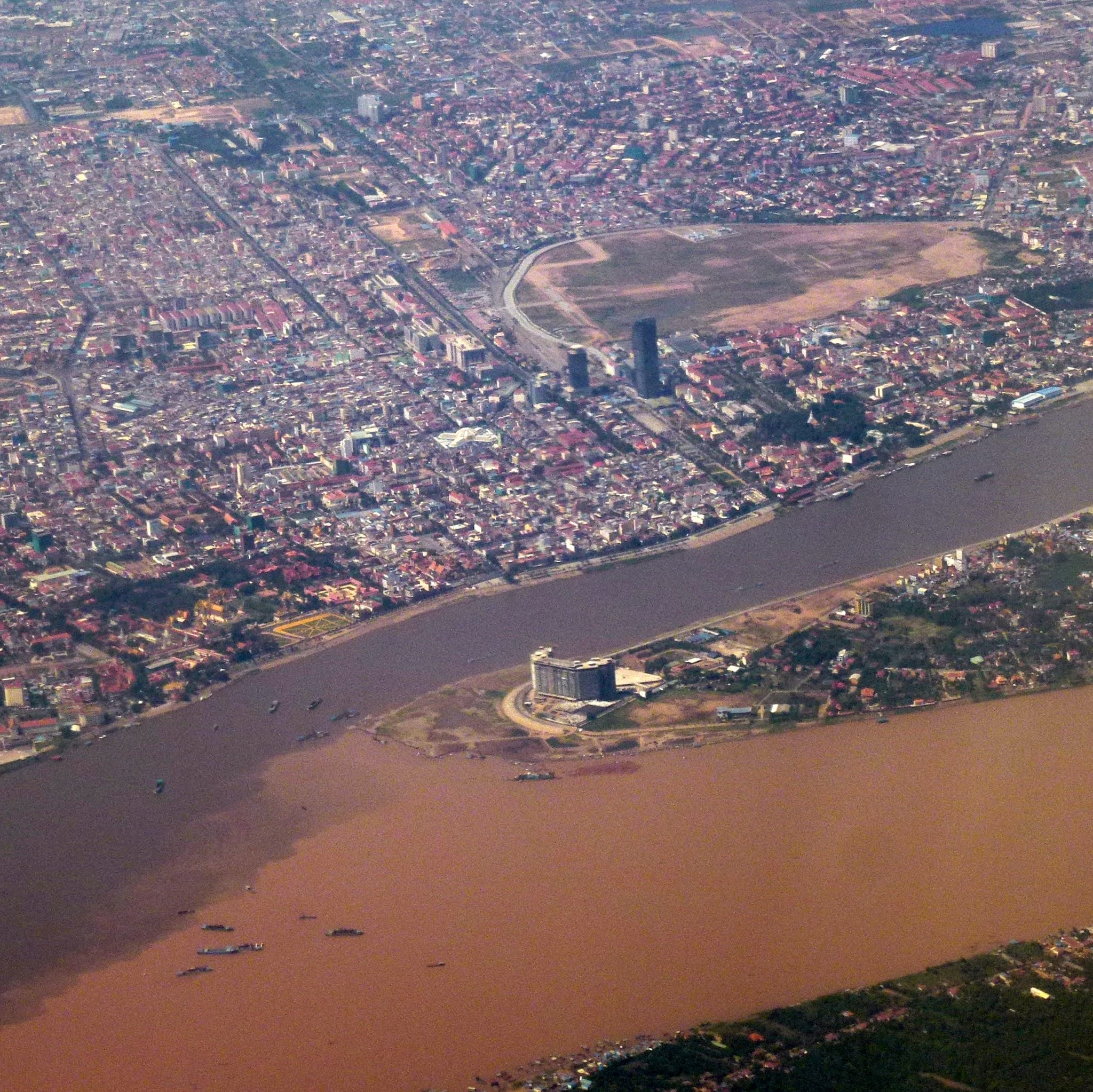
View of Phnom Penh from above, showing the confluence of the Tonlé Sap River and Mekong, and the filled in lake of Boeung Kak.

Phnom Penh is in the south-central region of Cambodia, and is fully surrounded by the Kandal province. The municipality is on the banks of the Tonlé Sap, Mekong, and Bassac Rivers. These rivers provide freshwater and other natural resources to the city. Phnom Penh and the surrounding areas consist of a typical flood plain area for Cambodia. While Phnom Penh is at 11.89 metres (39 ft) above the river, monsoon season flooding is a problem, and the river sometimes overflows its banks. Boeung Kak, Phnom Penh's largest freshwater lake, was controversially filled in 2010 to make way for property development.

=== Climate ===
Phnom Penh has a tropical wet and dry climate (Köppen climate classification Aw). The climate is hot year-round with only minor variations. Temperatures typically range from 22 to 35 °C (72 to 95 °F) and weather is subject to the tropical monsoons. The southwest monsoon blows inland bringing moisture-laden winds from the Gulf of Thailand and Indian Ocean from May to November, sees high temperatures accompanied by high humidity. The dry season lasts from December to April; when overnight temperatures can drop to 22 °C (72 °F).

Climate data for Phnom Penh (temperature: 1988–2013, extremes: 1906–2013)
Month	Jan	Feb	Mar	Apr	May	Jun	Jul	Aug	Sep	Oct	Nov	Dec	Year
Record high °C (°F)	36.1 (97.0)	38.1 (100.6)	40.0 (104.0)	40.5 (104.9)	40.0 (104.0)	39.2 (102.6)	37.2 (99.0)	37.8 (100.0)	35.5 (95.9)	36.1 (97.0)	34.4 (93.9)	37.2 (99.0)	40.5 (104.9)
Mean daily maximum °C (°F)	31.6 (88.9)	33.2 (91.8)	34.6 (94.3)	35.3 (95.5)	34.8 (94.6)	33.8 (92.8)	32.9 (91.2)	32.7 (90.9)	32.2 (90.0)	31.4 (88.5)	31.1 (88.0)	30.8 (87.4)	32.9 (91.2)
Daily mean °C (°F)	26.6 (79.9)	28.0 (82.4)	29.4 (84.9)	30.2 (86.4)	30.0 (86.0)	29.2 (84.6)	28.7 (83.7)	28.5 (83.3)	28.2 (82.8)	27.2 (81.0)	27.1 (80.8)	26.3 (79.3)	28.3 (82.9)
Mean daily minimum °C (°F)	21.8 (71.2)	22.8 (73.0)	24.3 (75.7)	25.5 (77.9)	25.6 (78.1)	24.9 (76.8)	24.8 (76.6)	24.6 (76.3)	24.4 (75.9)	24.2 (75.6)	23.2 (73.8)	21.9 (71.4)	24.0 (75.2)
Record low °C (°F)	12.8 (55.0)	15.2 (59.4)	19.0 (66.2)	17.8 (64.0)	20.6 (69.1)	21.2 (70.2)	20.1 (68.2)	20.0 (68.0)	21.1 (70.0)	17.2 (63.0)	16.7 (62.1)	14.4 (57.9)	12.8 (55.0)
Average precipitation mm (inches)	12.1 (0.48)	6.6 (0.26)	34.8 (1.37)	78.8 (3.10)	118.2 (4.65)	145.0 (5.71)	162.1 (6.38)	182.7 (7.19)	270.9 (10.67)	248.1 (9.77)	120.5 (4.74)	32.1 (1.26)	1,411.9 (55.58)
Average rainy days (≥ 0.1 mm)	1.2	1.1	3.4	6.8	15.9	17.0	18.1	18.3	21.5	19.3	10.2	4.5	137.3
Average relative humidity (%)	73	71	71	73	77	78	80	81	84	84	78	73	77
Mean monthly sunshine hours	260	226	267	240	202	192	143	174	129	202	213	242	2,490
Source 1: Deutscher Wetterdienst
Source 2: Danish Meteorological Institute (sun, 1931–1960)

== Administration ==
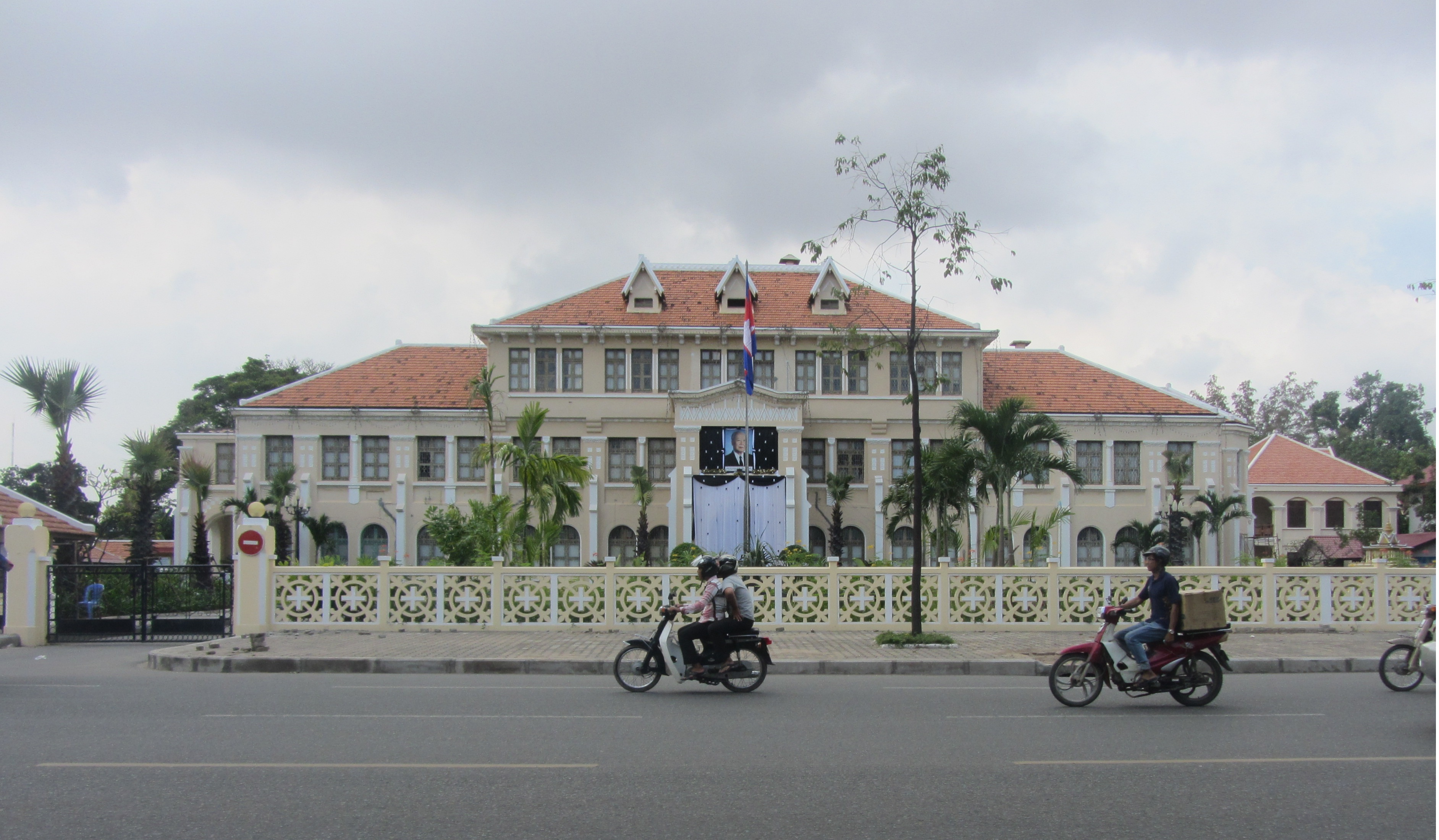
Phnom Penh Capital Hall

Sections (khans) of Phnom Penh.

Phnom Penh is an autonomous municipality of area 678.46 square kilometres (261.95 sq mi) with a government status equal to that of the provinces. The autonomous municipality is subdivided into 14 administrative divisions called khans (sections). The districts are subdivided into 105 sangkats (quarters), and further subdivided into 953 phums (villages).

Phnom Penh is governed by the governor who acts as the top executive of the city and overseeing the Municipal Military Police, Municipal Police, and Bureau of Urban Affairs. Below the governor is the first vice governor and five vice governors. The chief of cabinet, who holds the same status as the vice governors, heads the cabinet consisting of eight deputy chiefs of cabinet who in turn are in charge of the 27 administrative departments. Every khans has a chief.

Phnom Penh administrative sections
ISO code	Name	Khmer	Quarters	Villages	Population
1201	Chamkar Mon	ខណ្ឌចំការមន	5	40	70,772
1202	Doun Penh	ខណ្ឌដូនពេញ	11	134	155,069
1203	Prampir Makara	ខណ្ឌប្រាំពីរមករា	8	66	71,092
1204	Tuol Kouk	ខណ្ឌទួលគោក	10	143	145,570
1205	Dangkao	ខណ្ឌដង្កោ	12	81	159,772
1206	Mean Chey	ខណ្ឌមានជ័យ	7	59	248,464
1207	Russey Keo	ខណ្ឌឫស្សីកែវ	7	30	274,861
1208	Sen Sok	ខណ្ឌសែនសុខ	6	47	182,903
1209	Pou Senchey	ខណ្ឌពោធិ៍សែនជ័យ	7	75	226,971
1210	Chroy Changvar	ខណ្ឌជ្រោយចង្វារ	5	22	159,233
1211	Prek Pnov	ខណ្ឌព្រែកព្នៅ	5	59	188,190
1212	Chbar Ampov	ខណ្ឌច្បារអំពៅ	8	49	164,379
1213	Boeng Keng Kang	ខណ្ឌបឹងកេងកង	7	55	66,658
1214	Kamboul	ខណ្ឌកំបូល	7	93	75,526

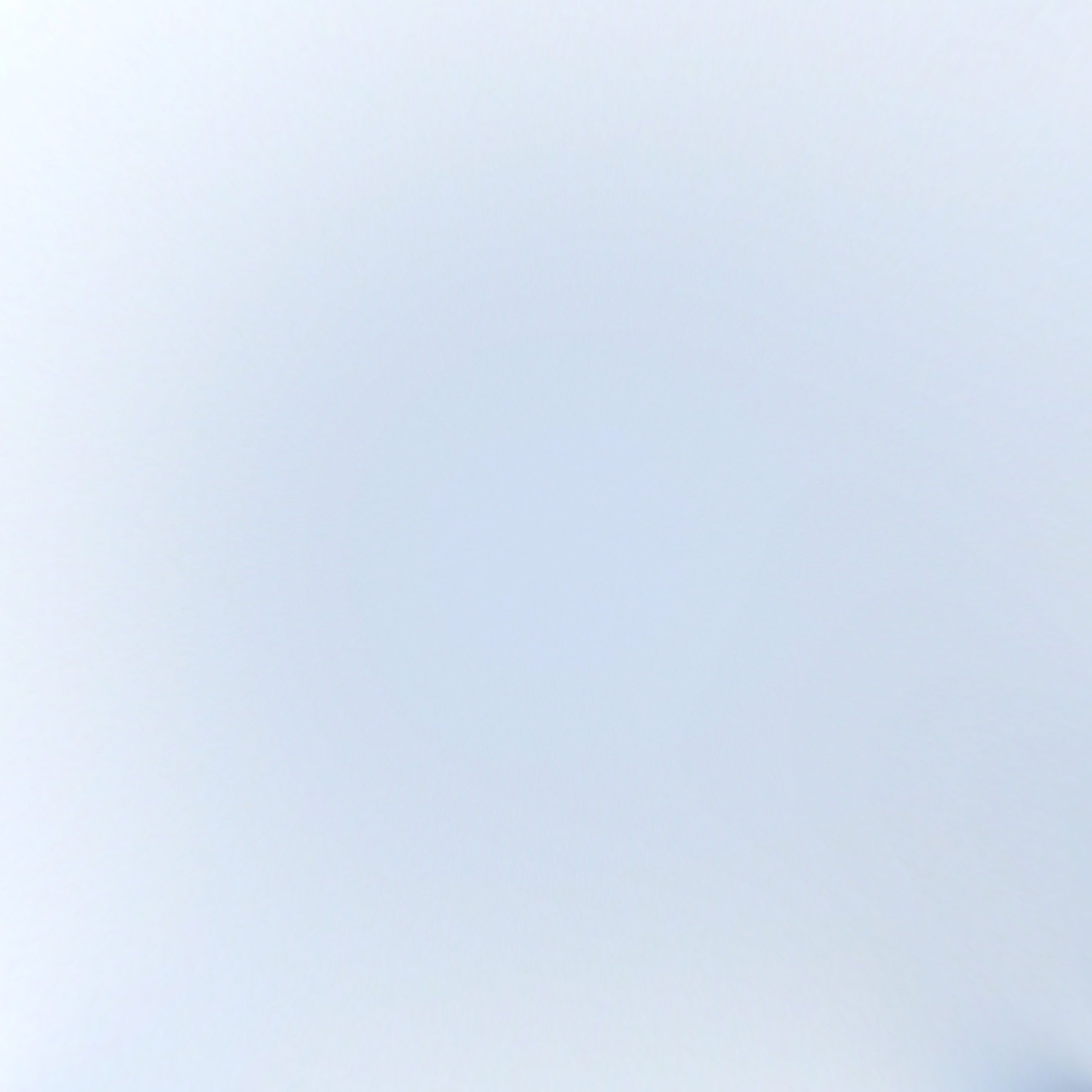
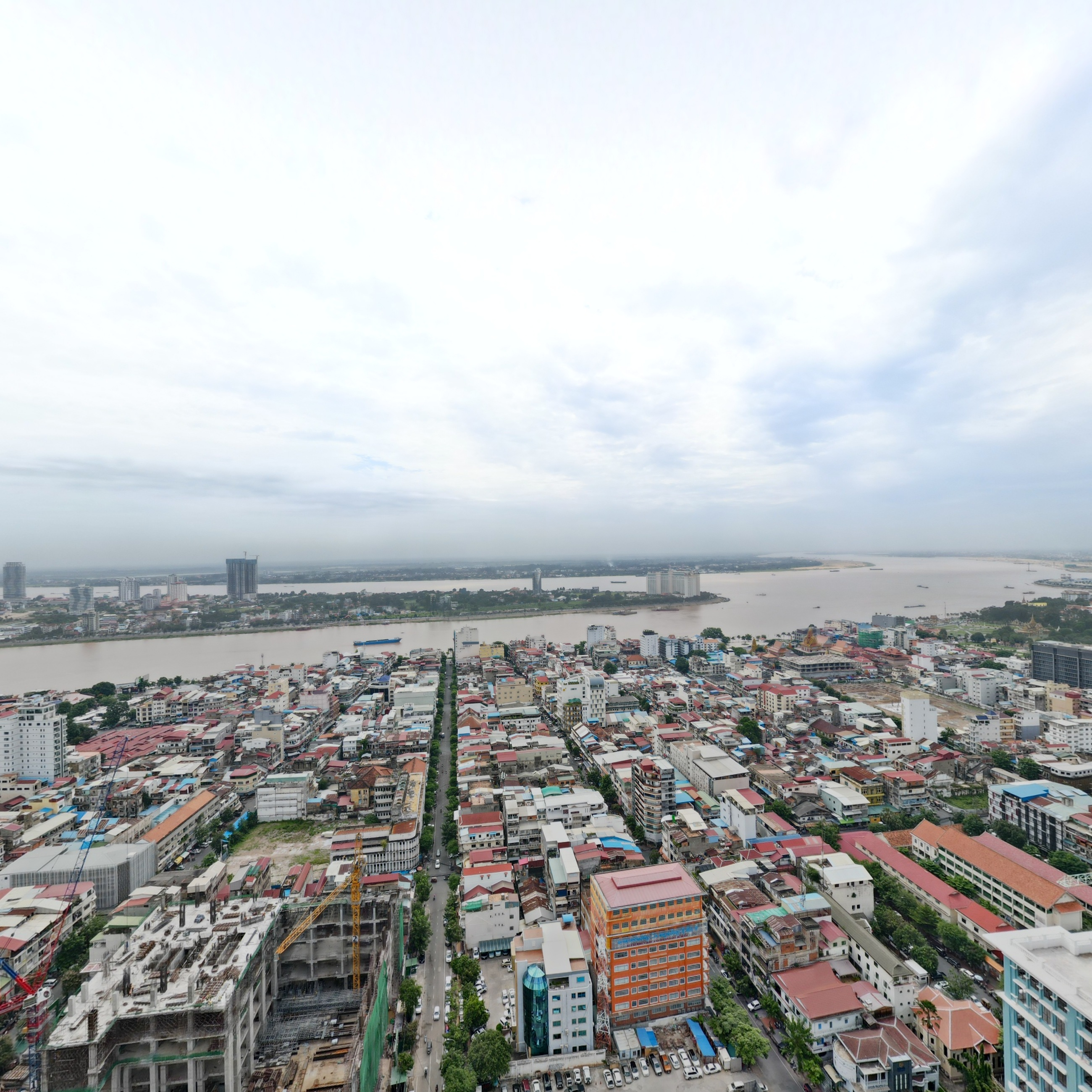
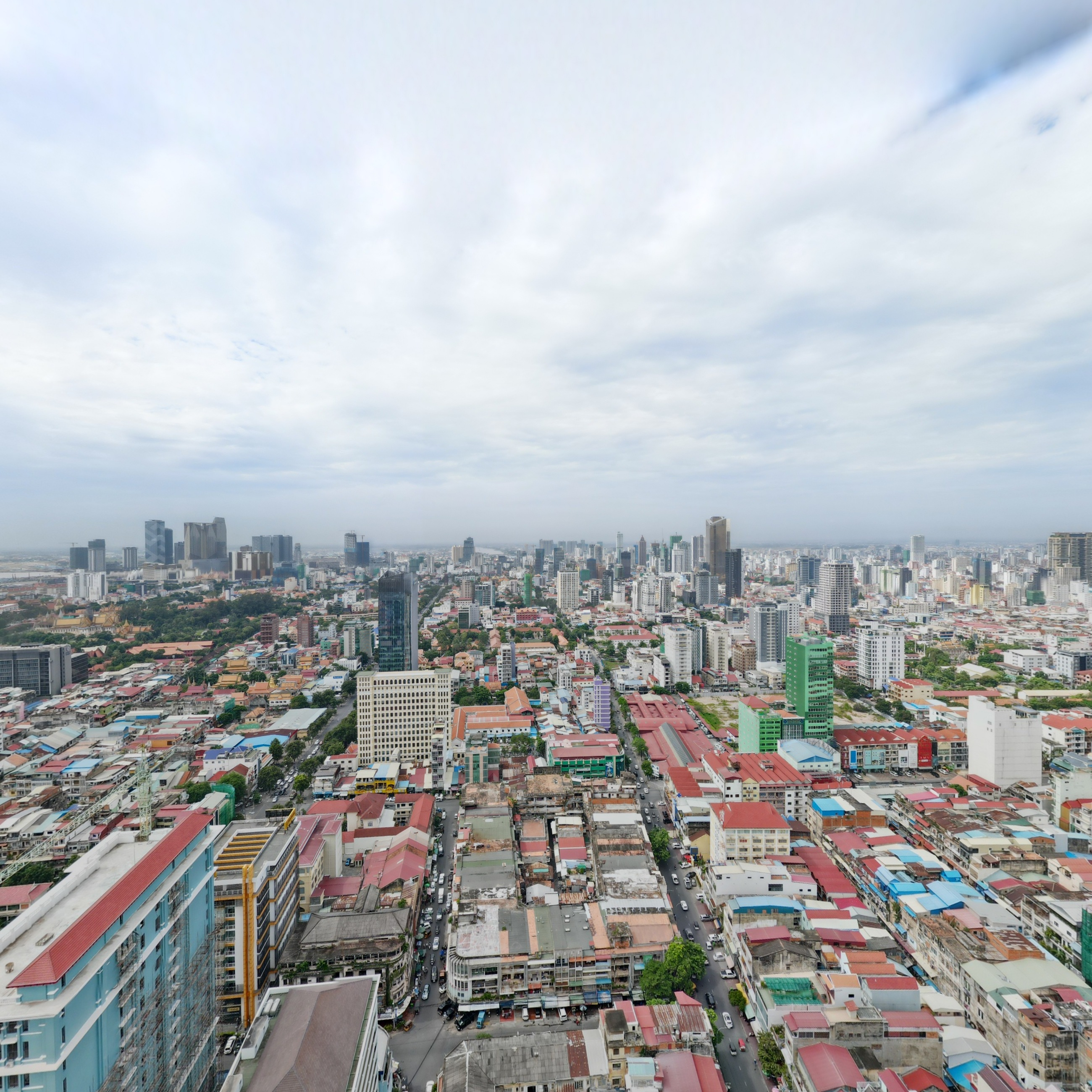
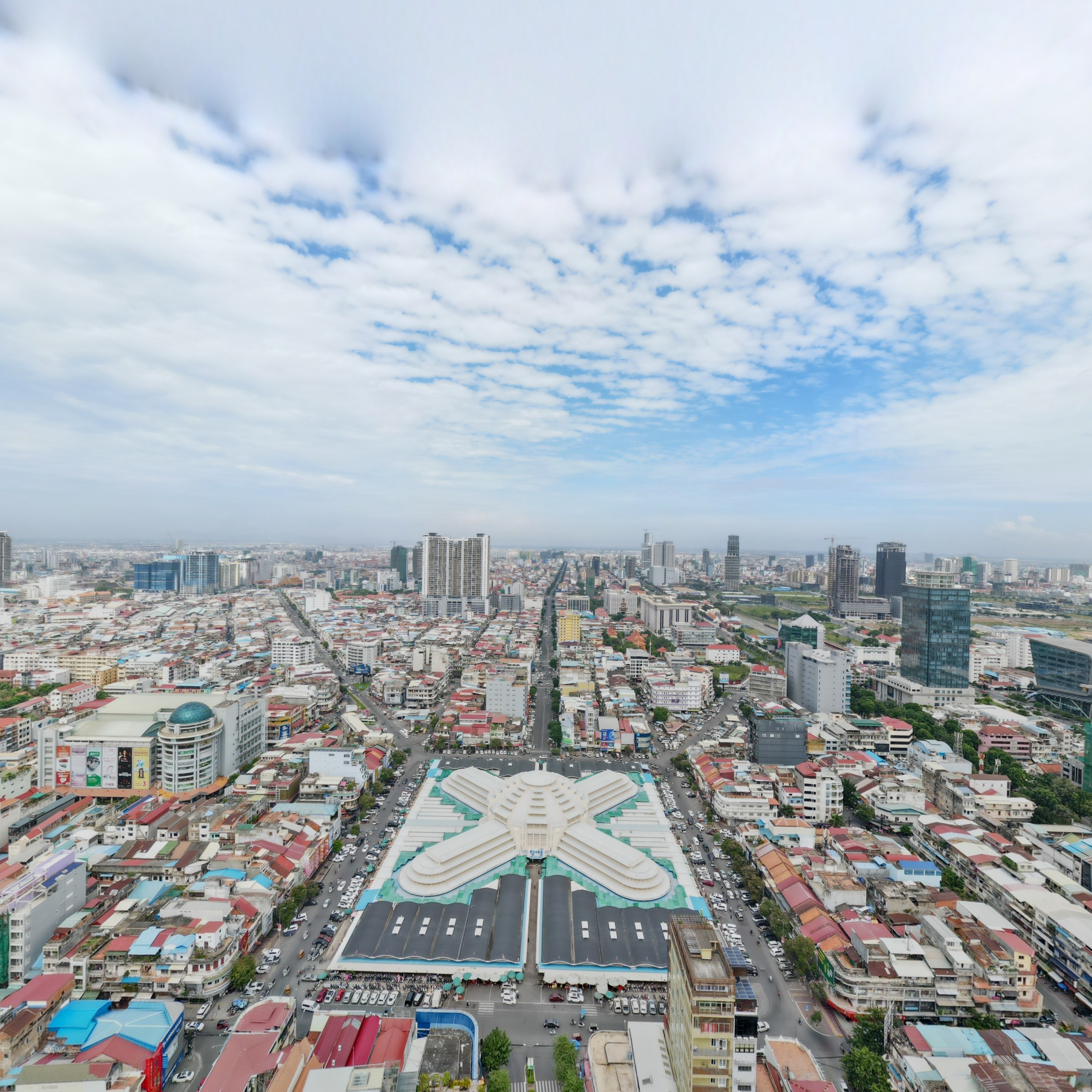
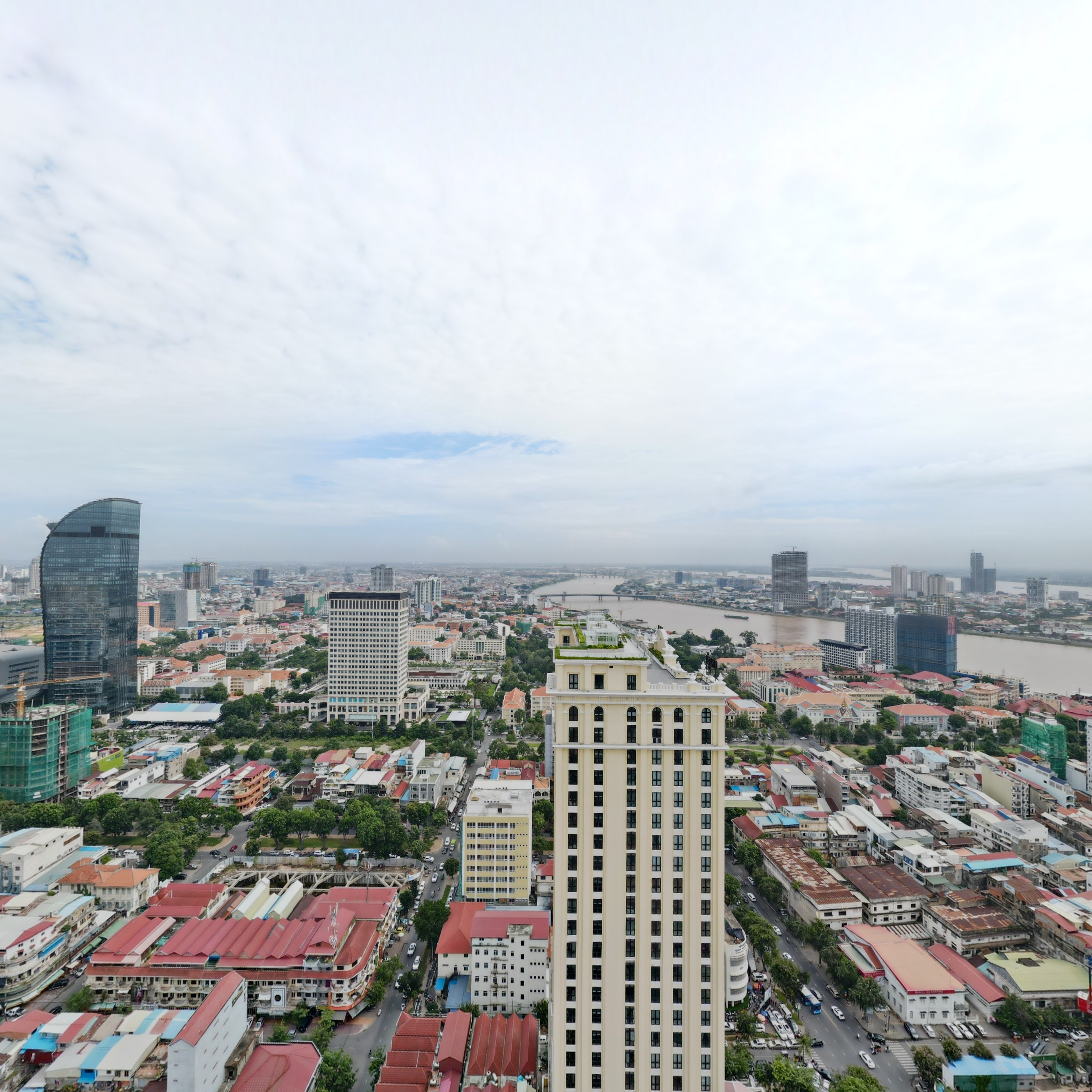
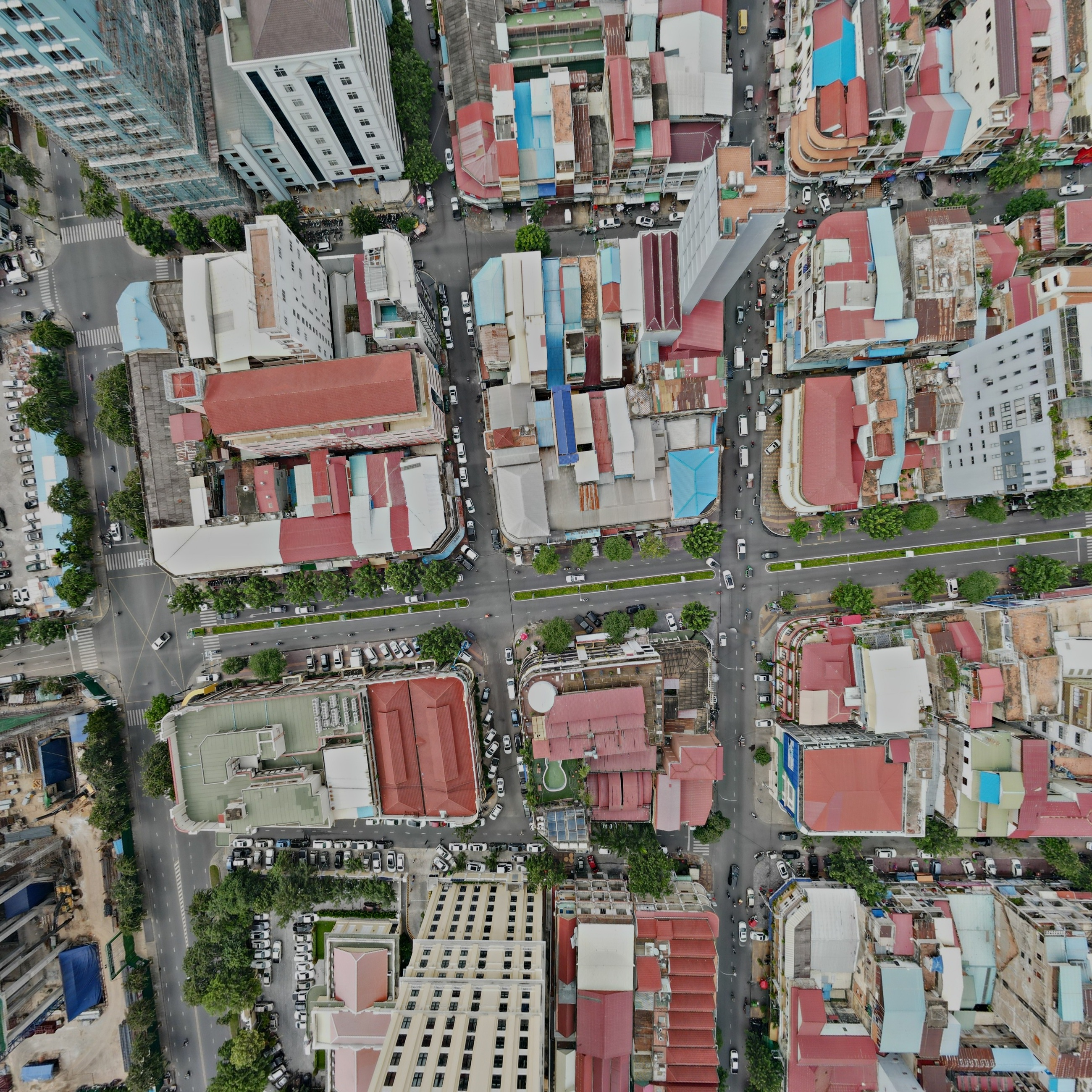
360° Panorama of Phnom Penh

== Demographics ==
Historical population
Year	Pop.	±% p.a.
1950	334,000	—
1960	398,000	+1.77%
1970	457,000	+1.39%
1975	370,000	−4.14%
1978	32,000	−55.78%
1980	189,000	+143.03%
1985	351,000	+13.18%
1990	634,000	+12.55%
1995	925,000	+7.85%
2000	1,284,000	+6.78%
2005	1,677,000	+5.49%
2010	2,101,725	+4.62%
2019	2,129,371	+0.15%

As of 2019, Phnom Penh had a population of 2,129,371 people, with a total population density of 3,136 inhabitants per square kilometre in a 679 square kilometres (262 sq mi) city area. A survey by the National Institute of Statistics in 2017 showed that 95.3% of the population in Phnom Penh are Khmer, 4% Chams, and 0.7% others, predominantly Chinese, Vietnamese, and other ethnic groups who are Thai, Budong, Mnong Preh, Kuy and Chong.

The official language is Khmer, and English and French are also used in the city. The number of slum-inhabitants at the end of 2012 was 105,771, compared with 85,807 at the start of 2012.

Note: As stated in the "History" paragraph (The 1998 Census put Phnom Penh's population at 862,000; and the 2008 census was 1.3 million.) the information collides with the information provided in the "Historical population" table. Needs editing.

=== Religion ===
Religion in Phnom Penh (2019 census)
1. Buddhism (97.8%)
2. Islam (1.60%)
3. Christianity (0.50%)
4. Animism and Other religions (0.10%)

== Politics ==
The National Assembly building of Cambodia

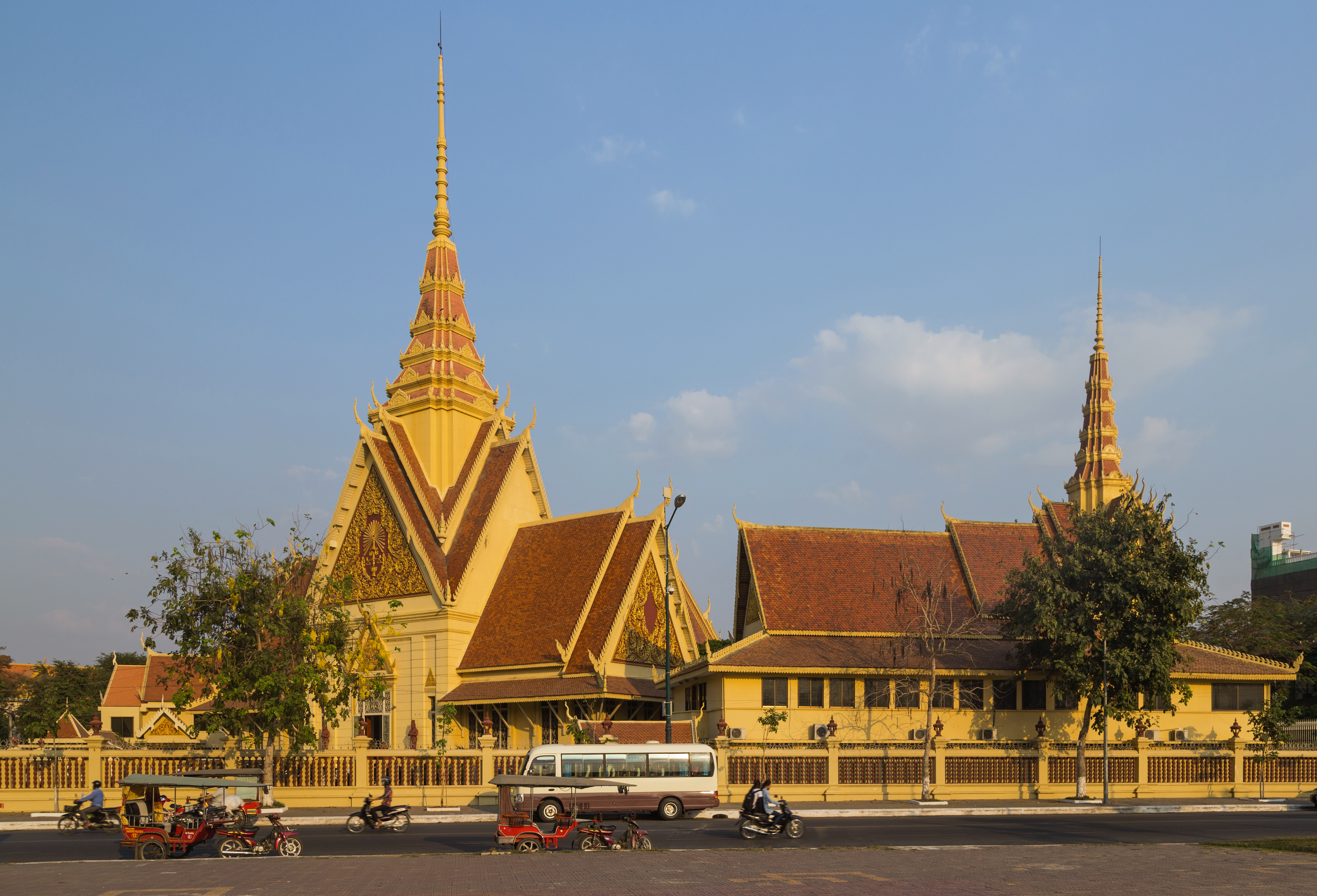
Supreme Court Building

Phnom Penh is allocated 12 seats in the National Assembly, making it the largest constituency.

=== Members of Parliament ===
Name		Political party
1	Pa Socheatvong	Cambodian People's Party
2	Ith Sam Heng	Cambodian People's Party
3	Mam Bunheng	Cambodian People's Party
4	Ing Kuntha Phavi	Cambodian People's Party
5	Kep Chuktema	Cambodian People's Party
6	Hou Sry	Cambodian People's Party
7	Krouch Sam An	Cambodian People's Party
8	Lauk Kheng	Cambodian People's Party
9	Ousman Hasan	Cambodian People's Party
10	Cheap Sivon	Cambodian People's Party
11	Pich Kimsreang	Cambodian People's Party
12	Ly Chheng	Cambodian People's Party

== Economy ==
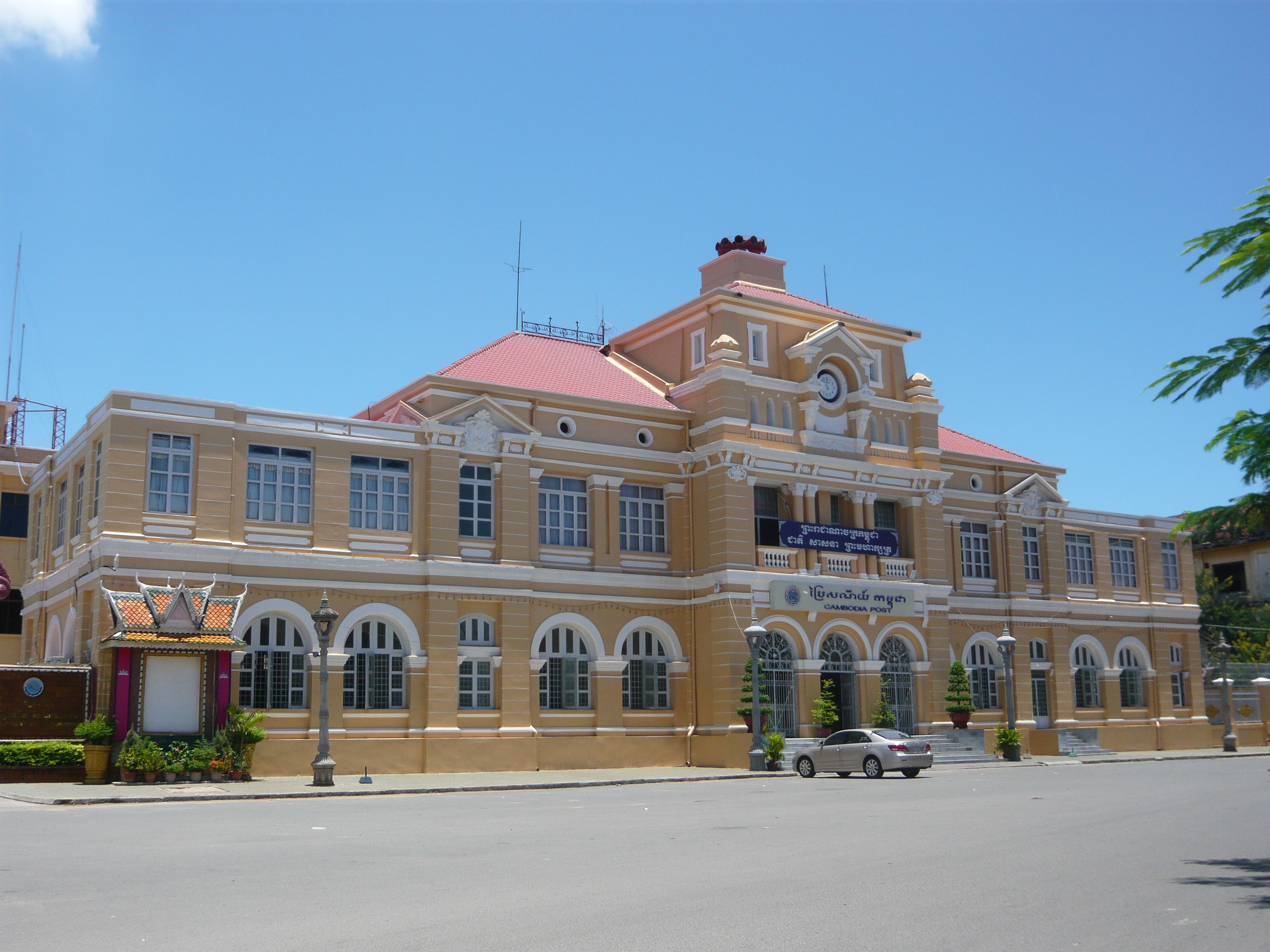
The Central Post Office Building

The Hong Kong Center, headquarters of oil producer TotalEnergies in Cambodia

The economy is based on commercial interests such as garments, trading, and small and medium enterprises. In some years the property business has been booming, with increasing real estate prices. Tourism is also a contributor in the capital as more shopping and commercial centres open. According to the World Travel and Tourism Council, tourism made up 19.2% (US$2,053 million) of Cambodia's GDP in 2009 and accounts for 13.7% of total employment. One of the areas in Phnom Penh for tourists is Sisowath Quay, alongside the Tonle Sap River. Sisowath Quay is a five kilometre strip of road that includes restaurants, bars, and hotels.

The US$2.6 billion new urban development, Camko City, is meant to bolster the city landscape. The Bureau of Urban Affairs of Phnom Penh Municipality has plans to expand and construct new infrastructure to accommodate the growing population and economy. High rise buildings will be constructed at the entrance of the city and near the lakes and riverbanks. New roads, canals, and a railway system will be used to connect Camko City and Phnom Penh.

Other projects include:

- Grand Phnom Penh International City (under construction)
- Gold Tower 42 (On hold 32 floors construction begins again in the mid of 2018)
- Kokling super second floor house
- Vattanac Capital Tower
- The Peak

The tallest skyscraper in Phnom Penh is Vattanac Capital Tower at a height of 188 metres (617 ft), dominating Phnom Penh's skyline with its neighbour skyscraper Canadia Tower (OCIC Tower).

== Education ==
=== Universities and colleges ===
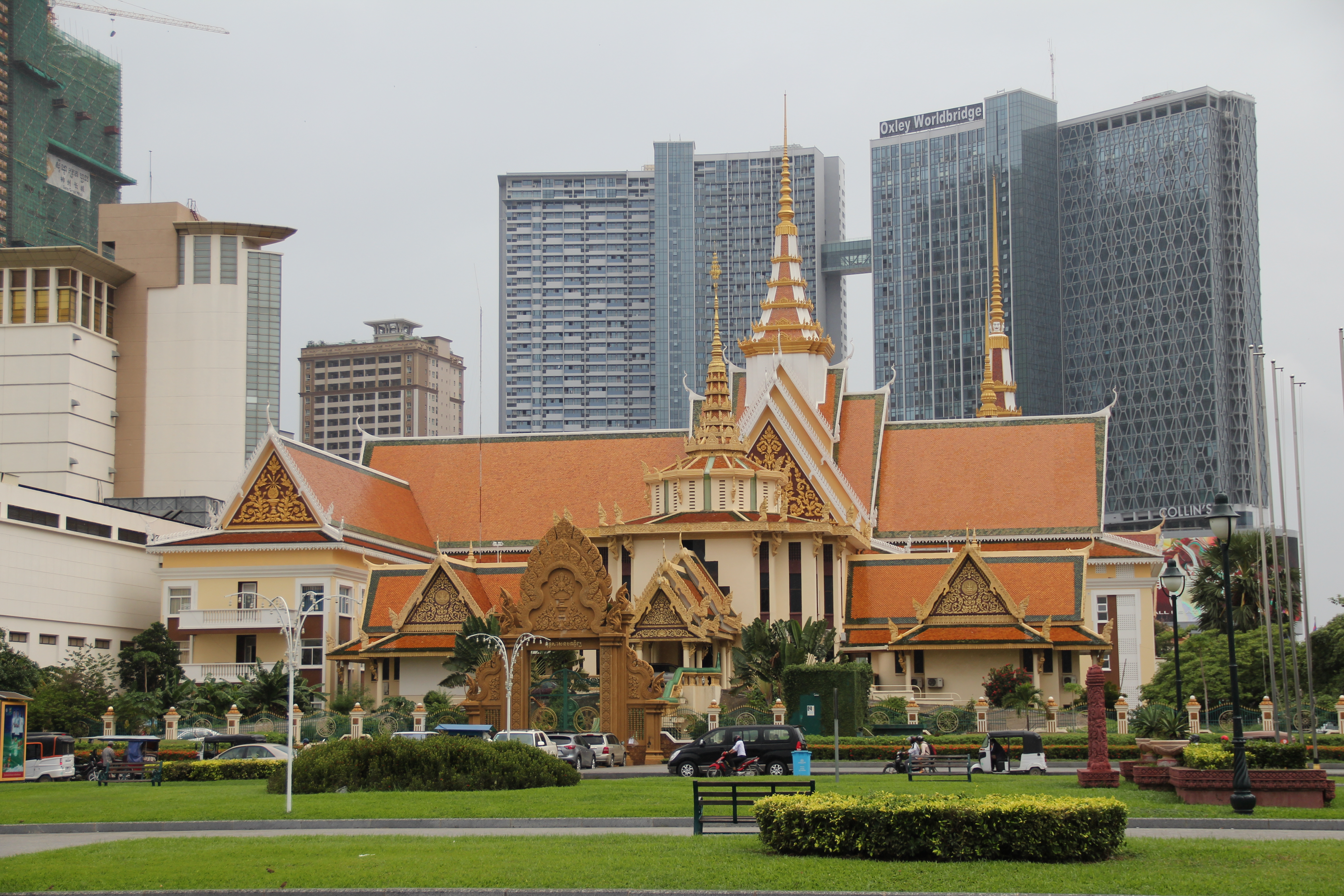
Buddhist Institute

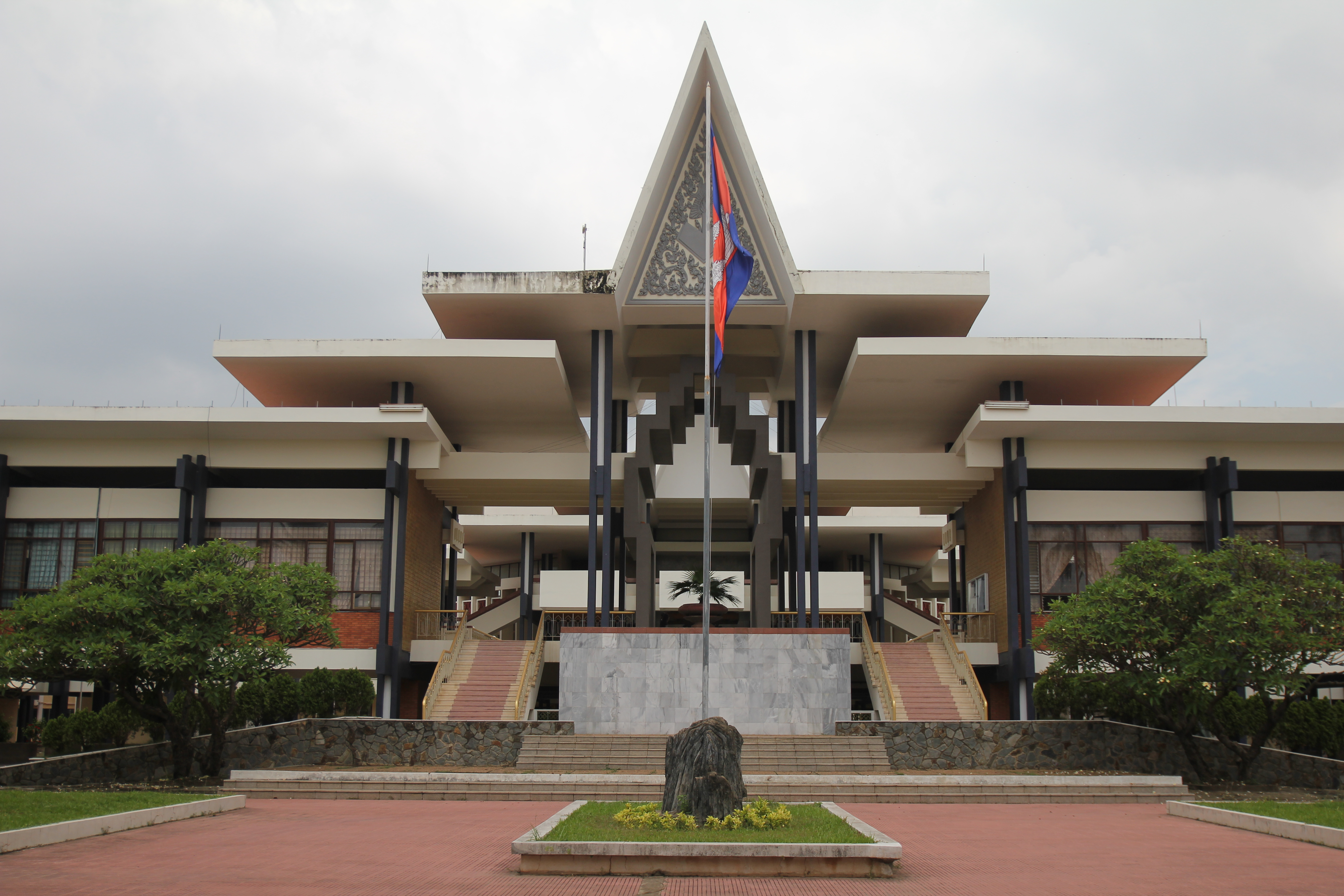
Royal University of Phnom Penh Campus II

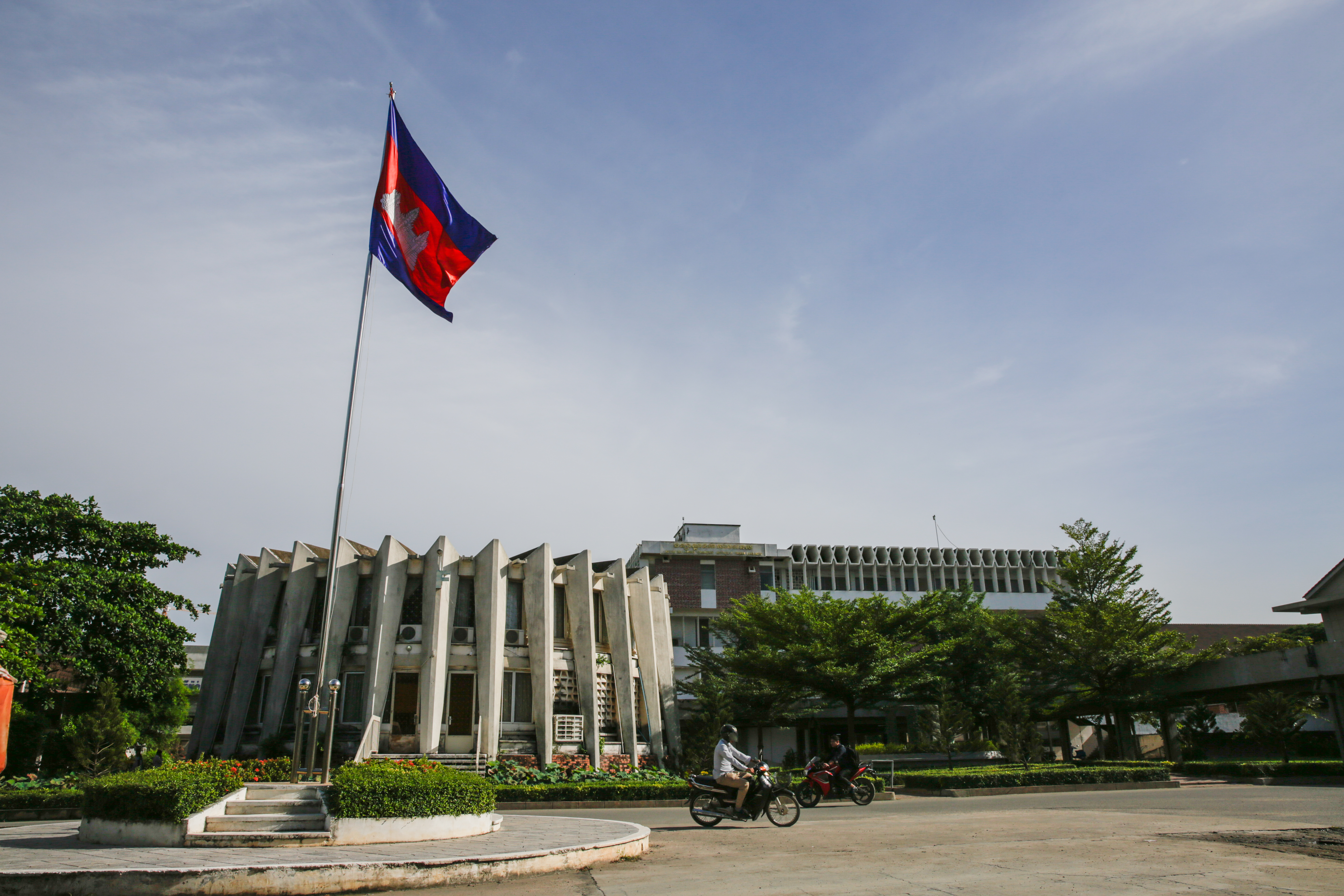
Institute of Foreign Languages

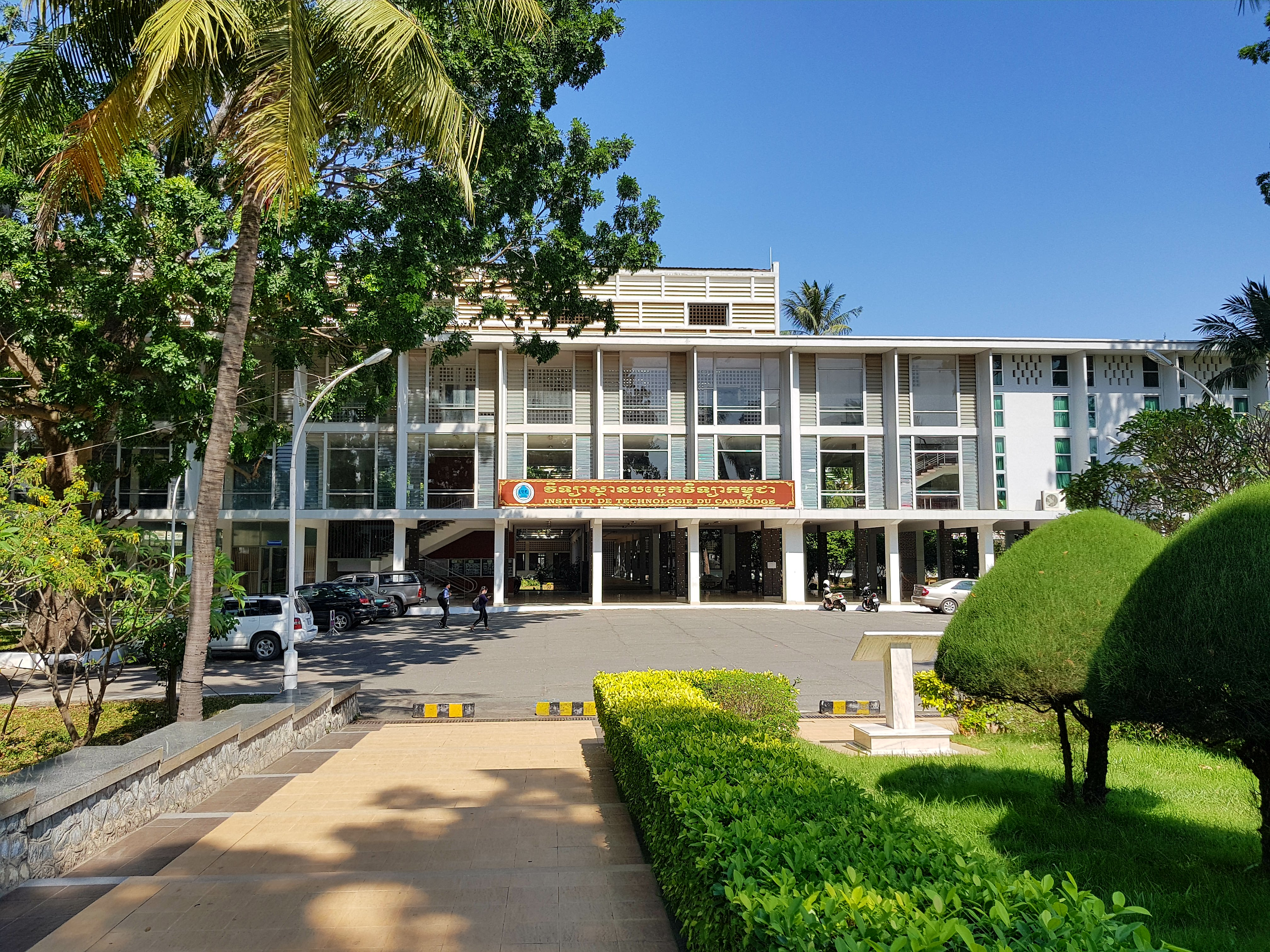
Institut de Technologie du Cambodge

Name	Khmer
American University of Phnom Penh	សាកលវិទ្យាល័យអាមេរិកាំងភ្នំពេញ
BELTEI International University	សាកលវិទ្យាល័យប៊ែលធីអន្តរជាតិ
Cambodia Academy of Digital Technology	បណ្ឌិត្យសភាបច្ចេកវិទ្យាឌីជីថលកម្ពុជា
University of Cambodia (UC)	សាកលវិទ្យាល័យកម្ពុជា
International University (IU)	សាកលវិទ្យាល័យអន្តរជាតិ
École Royale d'Administration (ERA)	សាលាភូមិន្ទរដ្ឋបាល
Royal University of Phnom Penh (RUPP)	សាកលវិទ្យាល័យភូមិន្ទភ្នំពេញ
Royal University of Law and Economics (RULE)	សាកលវិទ្យាល័យភូមិន្ទនីតិសាស្ត្រ និងវិទ្យាសាស្ត្រសេដ្ឋកិច្ច
Royal University of Fine Arts (RUFA)	សាកលវិទ្យាល័យភូមិន្ទវិចិត្រសិល្បៈ
Royal University of Agriculture (RUA)	សាកលវិទ្យាល័យភូមិន្ទកសិកម្ម
National University of Management (NUM)	សាកលវិទ្យាល័យជាតិគ្រប់គ្រង
Institute of Technology of Cambodia (ITC)	វិទ្យាស្ថានបច្ចេកវិទ្យាកម្ពុជា
Buddhist Institute	វិទ្យាស្ថានពុទ្ធសាសនបណ្ឌិត្យ
Royal Academy of Cambodia	រាជបណ្ឌិត្យសភាកម្ពុជា
Cambodian Agricultural Research and Development Institute	វិទ្យាស្ថានស្រាវជ្រាវ និងអភិវឌ្ឍកសិកម្មកម្ពុជា
National Institute of Business	វិទ្យាស្ថានជាតិពាណិជ្ជសាស្ត្រ
National Institute of Education	វិទ្យាស្ថានជាតិអប់រំ
National Polytechnic Institute of Cambodia	វិទ្យាស្ថានជាតិពហុបច្ចេកទេសកម្ពុជា
National Technical Training Institute	វិទ្យាស្ថានជាតិបណ្តុះបណ្តាលបច្ចេកទេស
Paññāsāstra University of Cambodia	សាកលវិទ្យាល័យបញ្ញាសាស្ត្រកម្ពុជា
Preah Sihanouk Raja Buddhist University	ពុទ្ធិកសាកលវិទ្យាល័យព្រះសីហនុរាជ
Prek Leap National College of Agriculture	សាលាជាតិកសិកម្មព្រែកលៀប
University of Health Sciences	សាកលវិទ្យាល័យវិទ្យាសាស្ត្រសុខាភិបាល
University of Puthisastra	សាកលវិទ្យាល័យពុទ្ធិសាស្ត្រ
Preah Kosomak Polytechnic Institute	វិទ្យាស្ថានពហុបច្ចេកទេសព្រះកុសុមៈ
Limkokwing University of Creative Technology	សាកលវិទ្យាល័យ លីមកុកវីង
Industrial Technical Institute	វិទ្យាស្ថានបច្ចេកទេសឧស្សាហកម្ម
Paragon International University	សាកលវិទ្យាល័យអន្តរជាតិផារ៉ាហ្គន
Institute For Development of Economy (IDE)	វិទ្យាស្ថានអភិវឌ្ឍន៍សេដ្ឋកិច្ច
Western University	សាកលវិទ្យាល័យវេស្ទើន
Student Development Institute (SDI)	វិទ្យាស្ថានអភិវឌ្ឍន៍និស្សិត
Asia Euro University	សាកលវិទ្យាល័យអាស៊ី អឺរ៉៉ុប

=== Primary schools, secondary schools, and high schools ===
Name	Name in Khmer
Bak Touk High School	វិទ្យាល័យបាក់ទូក
Chaktomuk Secondary School	អនុវិទ្យាល័យចតុមុខ
Chbar Ampov High School	វិទ្យាល័យច្បារអំពៅ
Chea Sim Boeng Kang Kang High School	វិទ្យាល័យជាស៊ីមបឹងកេងកង
Chea Sim Chroy Changvar High School	វិទ្យាល័យជាស៊ីមជ្រោយចង្វារ
Chea Sim Samaky High School	វិទ្យាល័យជាស៊ីមសាមគ្គី
Chea Sim Santhormok High School	វិទ្យាល័យជាស៊ីមសន្ធរម៉ុក
Hun Sen-Bun Rany Phsar Daeum Thkov High School	វិទ្យាល័យហ៊ុនសែនប៊ុនរ៉ានីផ្សារដើមថ្កូវ
Indradevi High School	វិទ្យាល័យឥន្ទ្រទេវី
Lycée Sisowath	វិទ្យាល័យព្រះស៊ីសុវត្ថិ
Tuol Svay Prey High School	វិទ្យាល័យទួលស្វាយព្រៃ
Wat Koh High School	វិទ្យាល័យវត្តកោះ

=== International schools ===
Name	Name in Khmer
GloLink International School Phnom Penh (GIS)	
Singapore (Cambodia) International Academy (SCIA)	សាលារៀនអន្តរជាតិស៊ីងហ្គាពួរ (ខេមបូឌា) អ៊ិនធើណេសិនណាល អេឃើឌឹមី
Abundant Life International School (ALIS)	សាលាអន្តរជាតិអាប៊ែនឌែនឡៃ
American Intercon School American Intercon School (AIS)	សាលារៀនអន្តរទ្វីបអាមេរិកាំង, Salariĕn Ántărătvib Amérĭkăng
Australian International School Phnom Penh (AISPP)	
Beijing International School	សាលាអន្តរជាតិប៉េកាំង, Sala Ántărăchéatĕ Pékăng
BELTEI International School	សាលាប៊ែលធីអន្តរជាតិ, Sala Bêlthi Ántărăchéatĕ
British International School of Phnom Penh	
CIA First International School	សាលាអន្តរជាតិស៊ីអាយអេហ្វឺសត៍, Sala Ántărăchéatĕ Si'ay'é Fœst
Canadian International School of Phnom Penh (CISP)	សាលាអន្តរជាតិកាណាដា
East-West International School	សាលាអន្តរជាតិអ៊ិសវ៉េស, Sala Ántărăchéatĕ 'Ĭs Vés
DK SchoolHouse	សាលាអន្តរជាតិ ឌីខេ ស្គូលហោស៍ DK Schoolhouse, International school
Footprint International School	
Harrods International Academy	
Home of English International School	Where learning is serious fun
iCAN British International School	
International School of Phnom Penh (ISPP)	សាលារៀនអន្តរជាតិភ្នំពេញ
International School of Singapore	
Invictus International School Phnom Penh	
Japanese School of Phnom Penh	金边日本学校
Lycée français René Descartes de Phnom Penh	
New Gateway International School	សាលាញូវហ្គេតវ៉េអន្តរជាតិ
Northbridge International School	
Paragon International School	សាលារៀនអន្តរជាតិផារ៉ាហ្គន, Salariĕn Ántărăchéatĕ Pharagân
Southbridge International School	
Advanced International School	សាលារៀនអន្តរជាតិអ៊ែតវ៉ាន់, 顶尖国际学校
LOGOS International School (LIS)	

=== Supplementary and extra schools ===
English	Original Name
Japanese Supplementary School of Phnom Penh	(プノンペン補習授業校, Punonpen Hoshū Jugyō Kō)
Rodwell Learning Center	សាលាបង្រៀនគួររ៉ដវែល, Sala Bángriĕn Kuŏr Râdvêl

The Japanese Supplementary School of Phnom Penh, formerly known in English as the Phnom Penh Japanese School, is a part-time Japanese School, operated by the Japanese Association of Cambodia (JACAM;カンボジア日本人会 Kambojia Nihonjin-kai). It is in Sangkat Toek Thla in Sen Sok. It was established in 2002. It had 60 students in June 2011.

Rodwell Learning Center is a tutoring center in Phnom Penh that provides students with extra support in core subjects including math and sciences to help them excel in their regular schoolwork and exams. The school uses practical, structured teaching methods to help learners master difficult concepts and build confidence in their academic abilities. It plays a key role in the city's local education community by offering families a reliable resource for supplementary learning and skill development.

== Culture ==
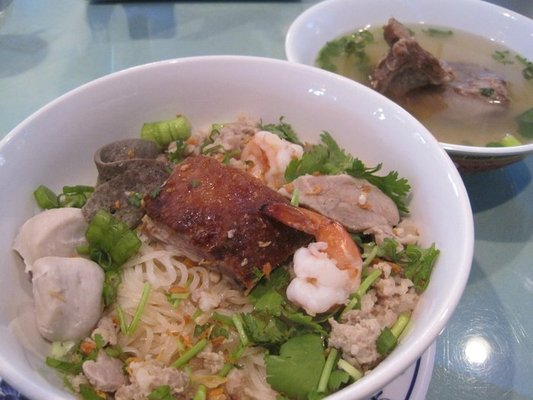
"Dried" version of Phnom Penh noodles with soup broth on the side.

The city hosts a number of music events throughout the city. Indie bands have grown in number due also in part to the emergence of private music schools such as SoundsKool Music (also operating in the city of Siem Reap), and Music Arts School (registered as a non-governmental organization). The Cambodian fishing dance originated in Phnom Penh at the Royal University of Fine Arts in the 1960s.

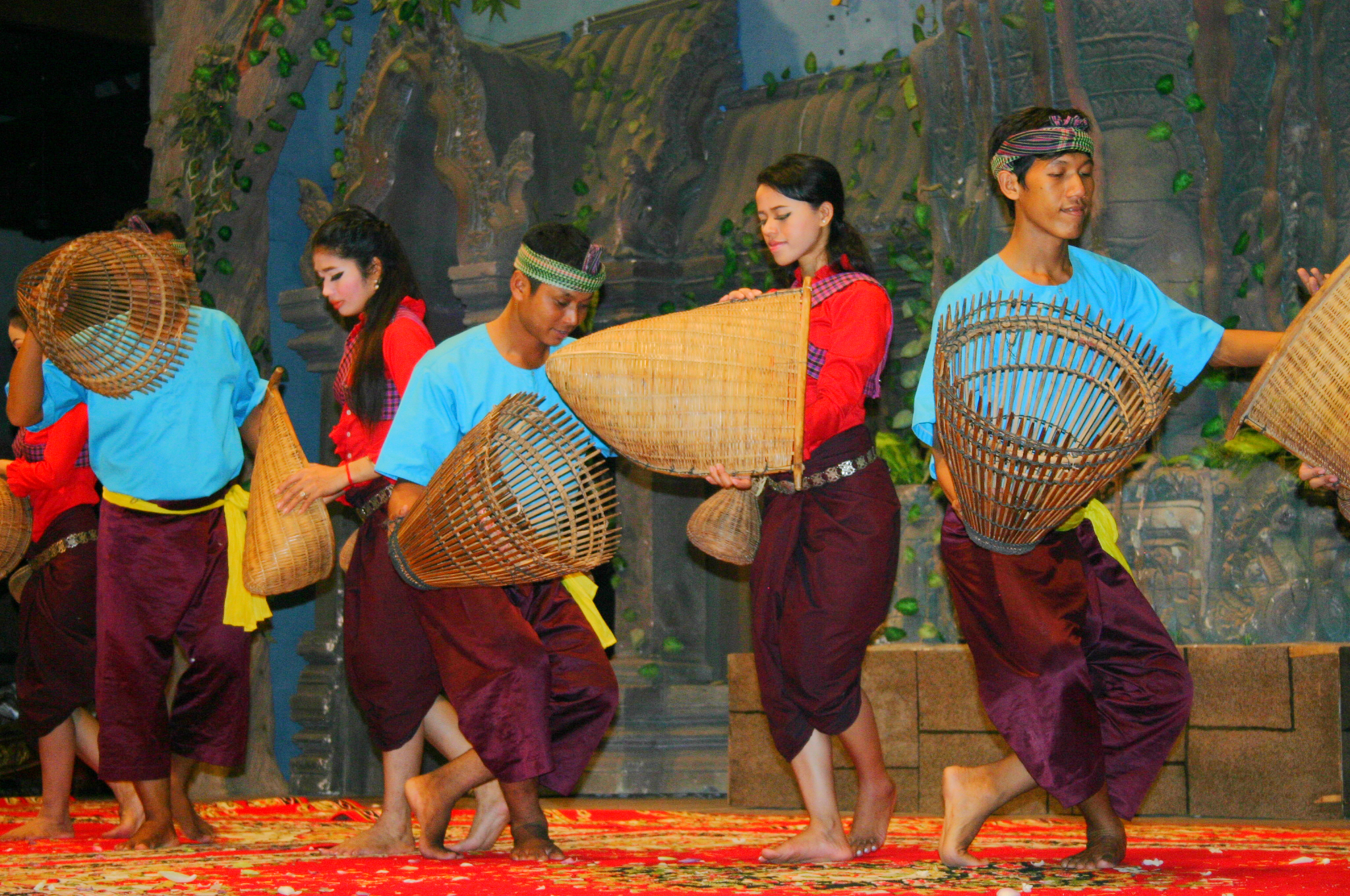
The Cambodian fishing dance originated from Phnom Penh.

=== Water Festival ===
The largest annual festival in Phnom Penh, this lively gathering celebrates the reversing of the flow of the Tonlé Sap River. The holiday lasts three days as people flood into the city to enjoy the fireworks, boat races, live concerts, eating and partying. The boat racing dates back to times marking the strengths of the Khmer marine forces during the Khmer Empire.

On 22 November 2010, at least 348 people were crushed to death in a bridge stampede at the festival.

== Cityscape and architecture ==
Norodom Sihanouk Memorial

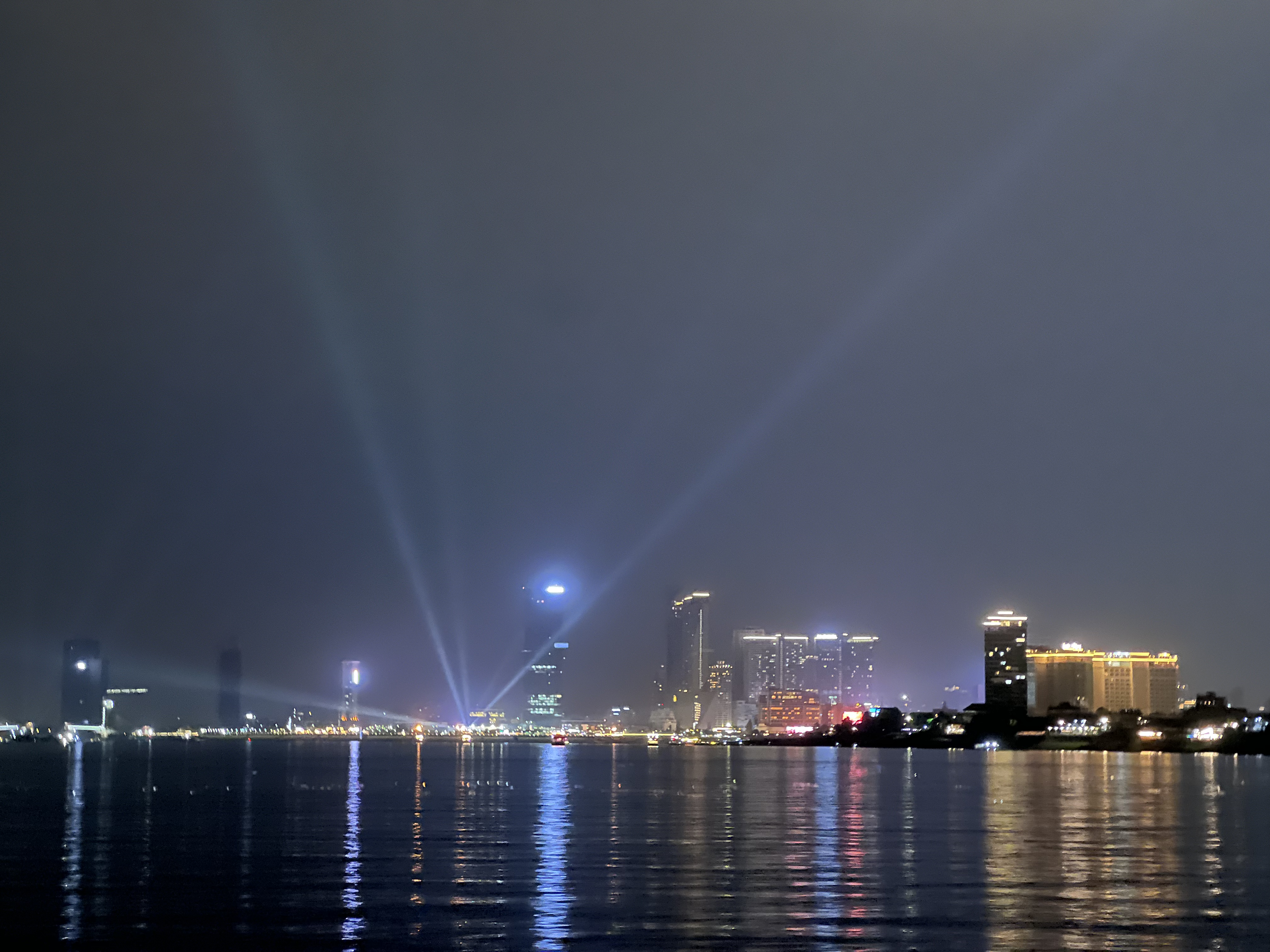
Phnom Penh city at night

Starting with independence from the French in the 1950s and lasting until the era of the Khmer Rouge in the 1970s, Phnom Penh underwent growth as the capital city of a newly independent country. King Sihanouk was eager to present a new style of architecture and thus invigorate the process of nation building. A new era of architecture took off, with projects and architects, some of whom educated in France, given opportunities to design and construct. This movement was called "New Khmer Architecture" and was characterised by a fusion of Bauhaus, European post-modern architecture, and traditional elements from Angkor. An architect was Vann Molyvann, who was nominated chief national architect by the king himself in 1956. Molyvann created landmark buildings such as the Preah Suramarit National Theatre or the Vann Molyvann House. Other architects helped construct the Royal Khmer University, the Institute of Foreign Languages, and the National Sports Centre. With the growth of the upper and entrepreneurial middle

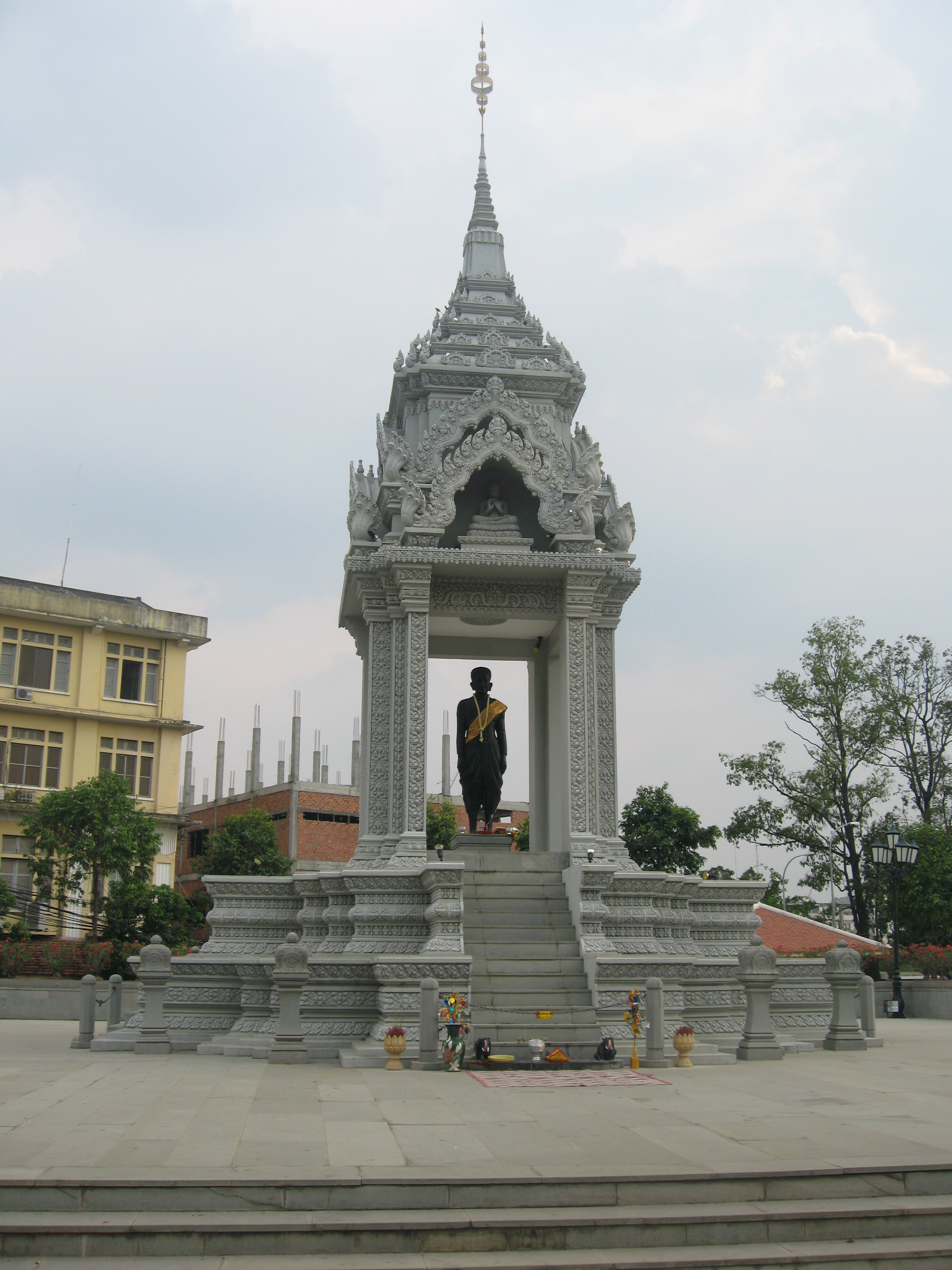
Statue of Lady Penh, the city's founder.

classes, new suburbs were built in the 1950s and 1960s. While these buildings survived the Khmer Rouge era and the civil war, later on they are under threat due to economic development and financial speculation.

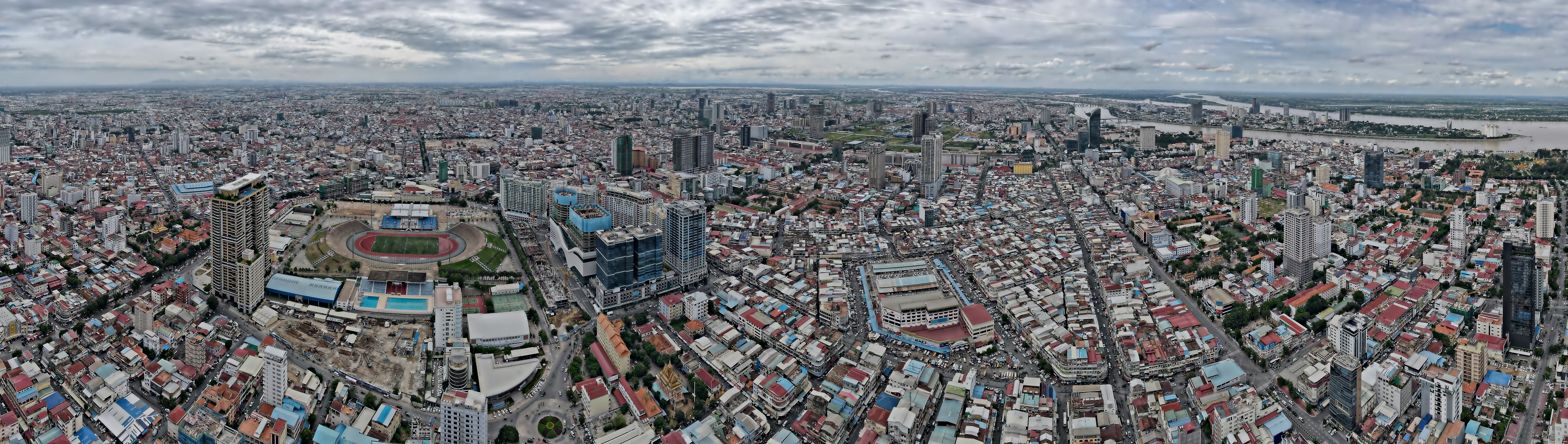
Panoramic view of Phnom Penh from City Center

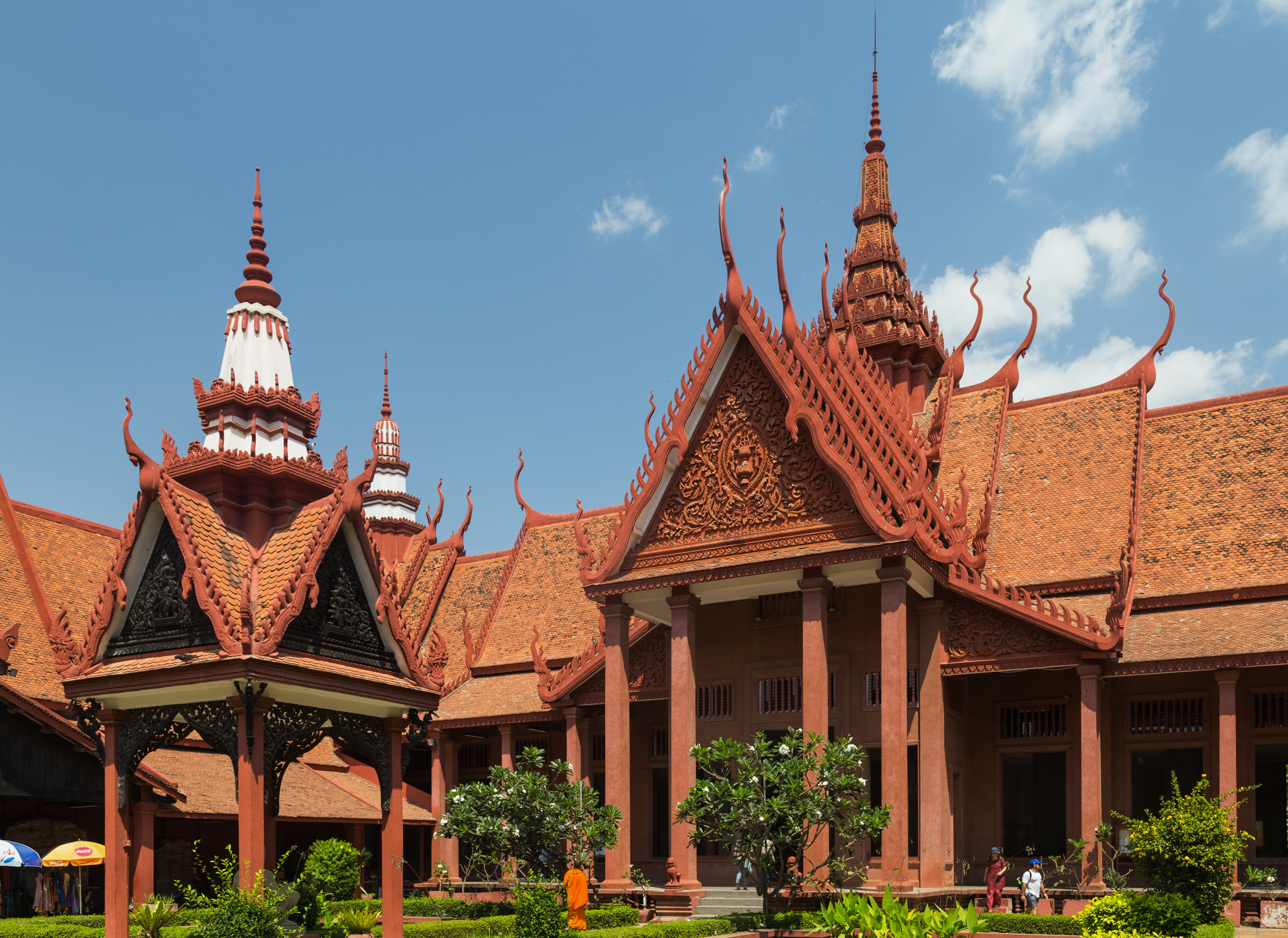
National Museum, designed in the early-1920s by George Groslier.

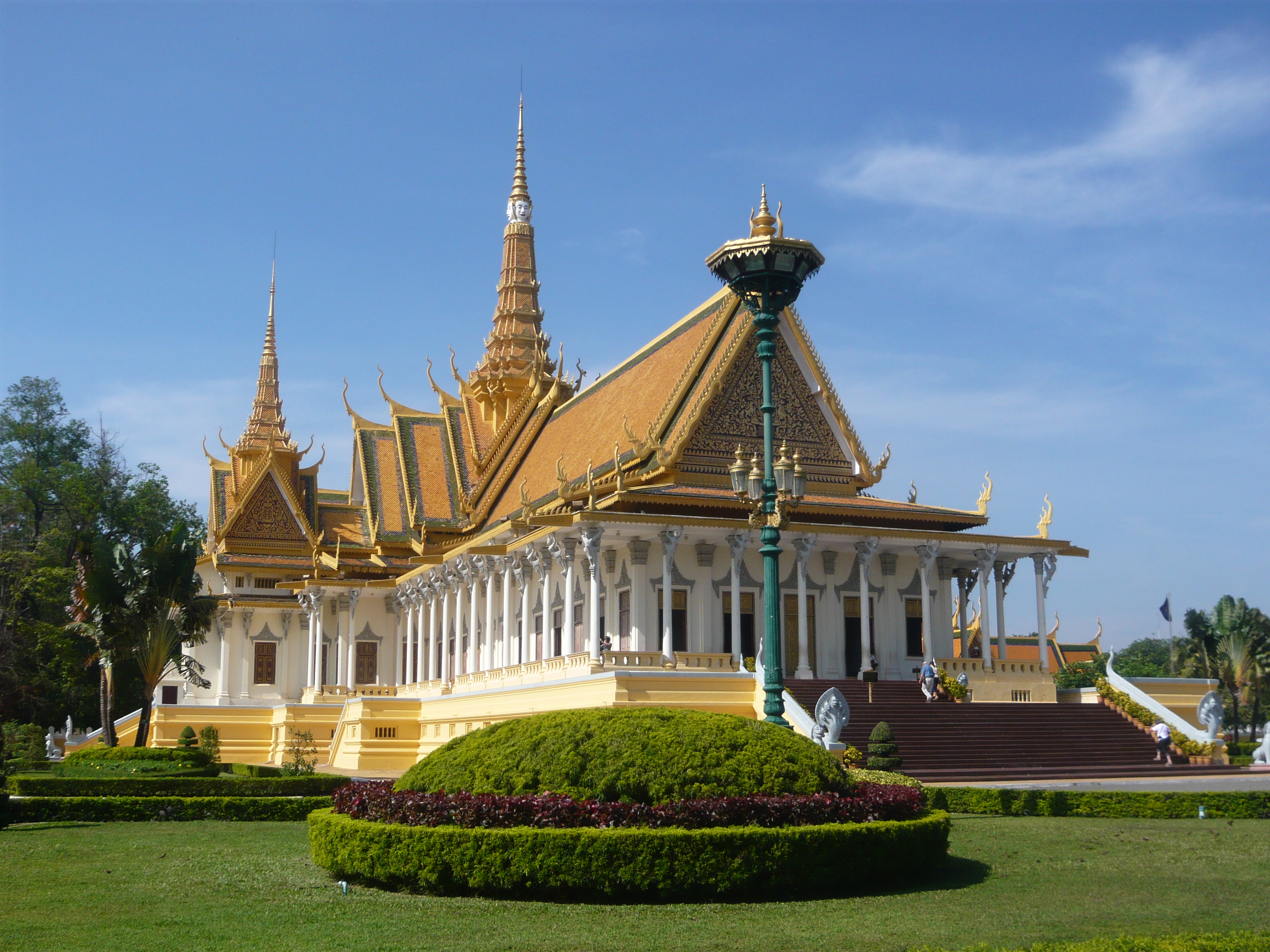
Royal Throne Hall, constructed in the 1860s under King Norodom I.

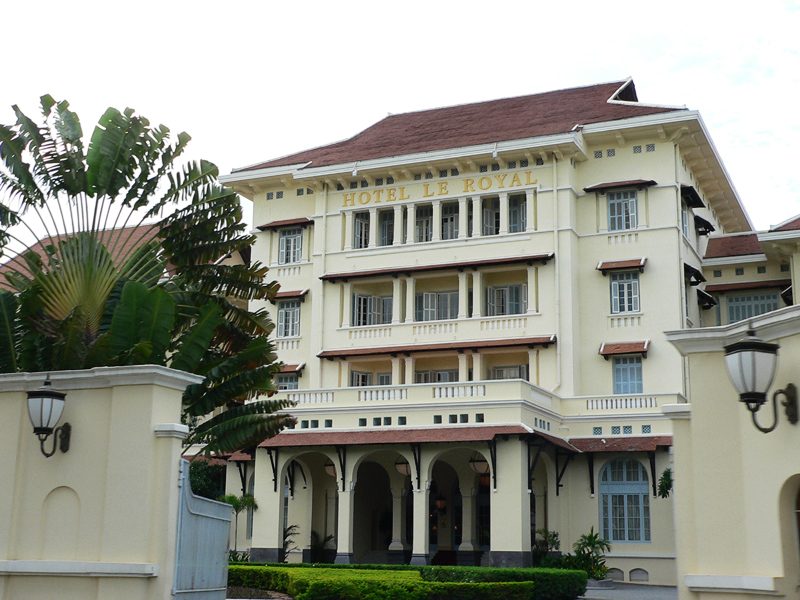
Façade, Hotel Le Royal, built in 1929 in the reign of King Sisowath Monivong.

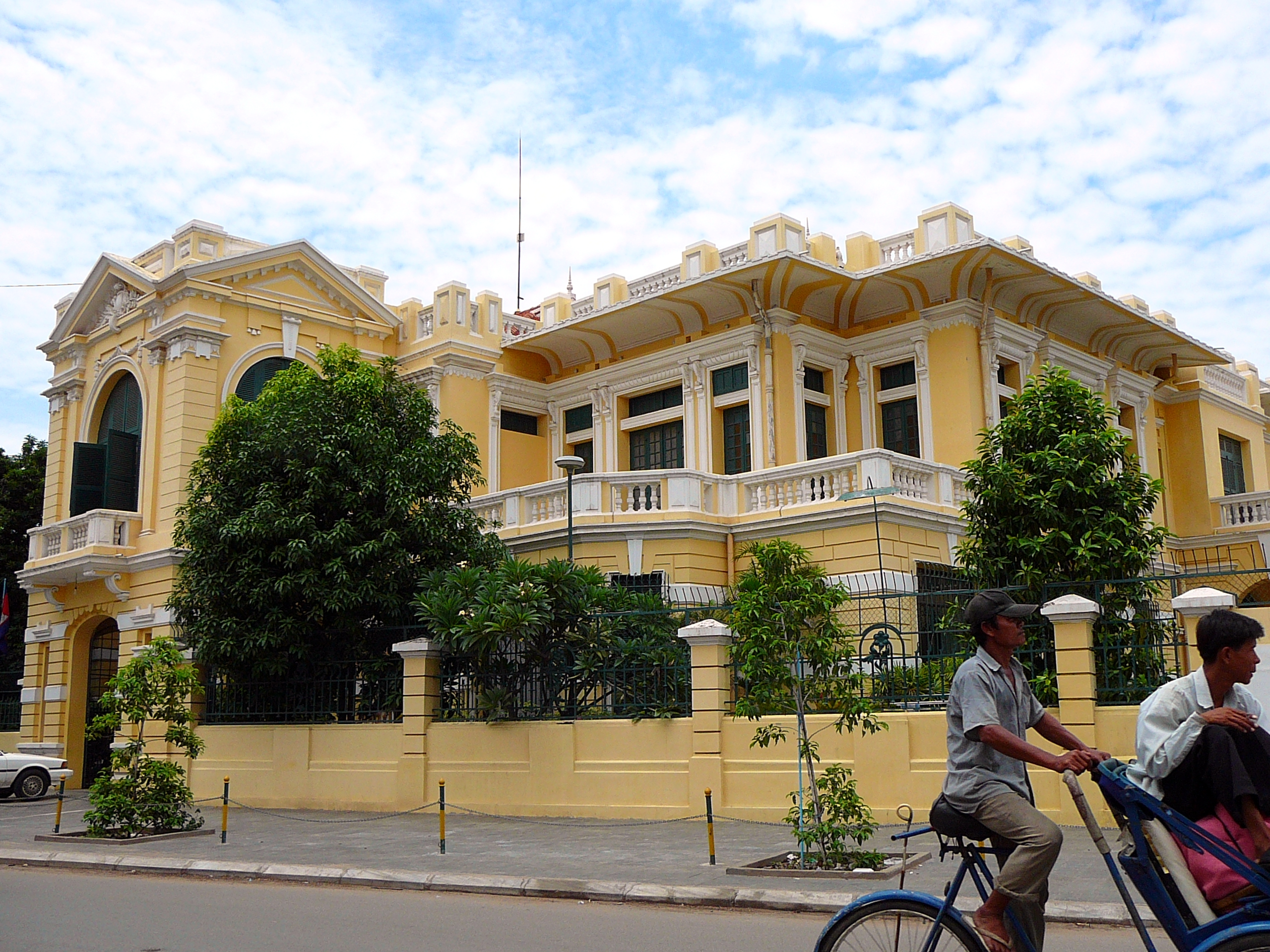
Colonial villa in Phnom Penh.

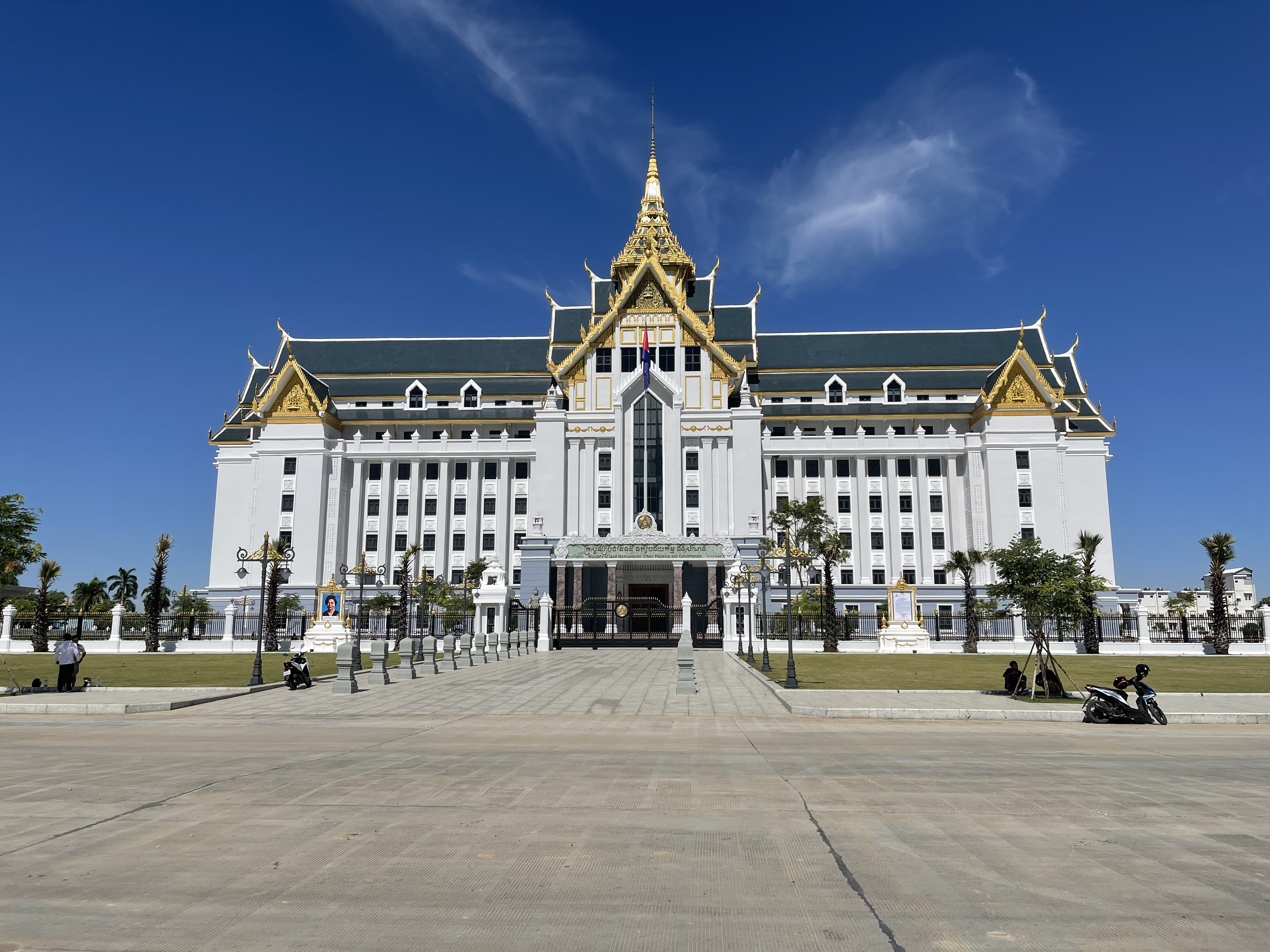
Ministry of Land Management, Urban Planning and Construction.

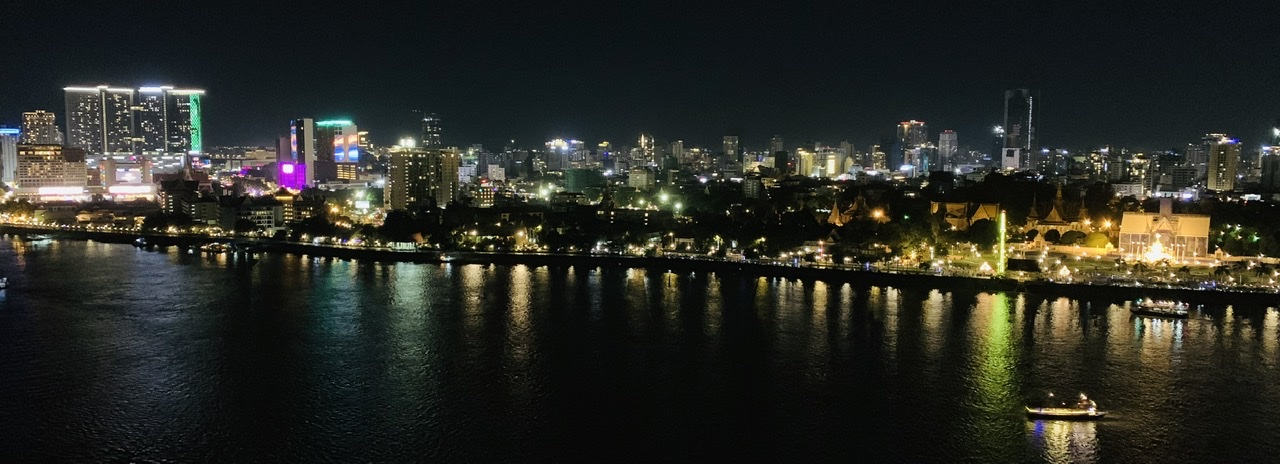
Phnom Penh city at night revealing skylines and the royal palace, viewed from the east bank of Tonle Sap river in September 2019.

=== 2035 master plan ===
Originally intended to be completed by 2020, the 2035 master plan is a French-funded project for the development of Phnom Penh. While the plan was approved by the Ministry of Land Management, Urban Planning and Construction in 2005, it has yet to be ratified by the Cabinet of Cambodia. The original plan details five edge-city projects connected to the historical city centre by waterways and tree-lined corridors.

== Media ==
=== Dailies ===
==== Khmer ====
- Sralagn' Khmer (Love Khmer)
- Chakraval Daily (Universe)
- Kampuchea Thmei Daily (New Cambodia)
- Kampuchea Tgnai Nis (Cambodia Today)
- Kanychok Sangkhum (Social Reflection)
- Koh Santepheap (Island of Peace)
- Moneaksekar Khmer (Khmer Conscience) – Published by the Sam Rainsy Party.
- Rasmei Kampuchea (Light of Kampuchea) – Cambodia's largest daily, it circulates about 18,000 copies.
- Samleng Yuvachun (Voice of Khmer Youth)
- Udomkate Khmer (Khmer Ideal)
- Wat Phnom Daily (Mount Temple)

==== English ====
- Phnom Penh Post, a daily English-language newspaper published in Phnom Penh.
- The Cambodia Daily, an English-language daily newspaper (fled from Cambodia in 2017, still operating online).
- Khmer Times, an English-language daily newspaper.

==== Chinese ====
- 《柬華日報》(Jianhua Daily), a daily Chinese-language newspaper published in Phnom Penh.
- 《星洲日報》(Sin Chew Daily), a Chinese-language daily newspaper, the Cambodian edition of the Malaysian Chinese daily of the same name.
- 《華商日報》(The Commercial News), a Chinese-language daily newspaper.
- 《高棉日报》(Khmer Daily), a Chinese-language daily newspaper.
- 《新柬埔寨》(New Cambodia), a Chinese-language daily newspaper.

=== Magazines ===
- AsiaLIFE Guide Phnom Penh, a monthly English-language lifestyle magazine published in Phnom Penh. (Ceased in 2018)
- F Magazine, the first fashion-forward magazine in Cambodia. Bi-lingual, written in English and Khmer.
- SOVRIN Magazine, is the fashion glossy magazine in Cambodia which written in khmer language.

=== Online news ===
- Thmey Thmey Phnom Penh
- Sabay News Phnom Penh
- Fresh News Phnom Penh

== Sport ==
Sporting venues in the city include the Morodok Techo National Stadium with a capacity of 60,000, which opened in 2021, and the Phnom Penh National Olympic Stadium with a capacity of 30,000 — while the country never hosted the Olympic Games due to disruption by the civil war and the Khmer Rouge in the 1970s, which built in 1964 as the co-home to the Cambodia national association football team. Volleyball, basketball, and Tai-Kwon-Do games are hosted at the stadium. The stadium closed in 2000.

== Transport ==
Phnom Penh Techo International Airport

Techo International Airport, which opened on the 9th of September 2025, is the largest and busiest airport in Cambodia. It is located 20 km south of Phnom Penh. It replaced Phnom Penh International Airport as the city's main aviation hub. The airport is connected to the city center by taxi, train, and shuttle bus. Cambodia's national flag carrier, Cambodia Angkor Air (later rebranched as Air Cambodia in 2025), launched in 2009, is headquartered in Phnom Penh and has its main hub there, with an additional hub at the Siem Reap–Angkor International Airport. Air France used to serve Phnom Penh from Paris-Charles de Gaulle and this service has since stopped. Qatar Airways flies to and from Phnom Penh, via Saigon. Taxis, pick-ups, and minibuses leave the city for destinations all over the country, and are losing ground to cheaper and more comfortable buses. Phnom Penh has a rail service. There are bus companies, including Phnom Penh Public Transport and GST Express, running services to most provincial capitals, including Sihanoukville, Kampong Chhnang, Oudong and Takéo. Phnom Penh Sorya Transport Co. offers bus service to provincial destinations along the National Routes and to Saigon.

=== Public transport ===
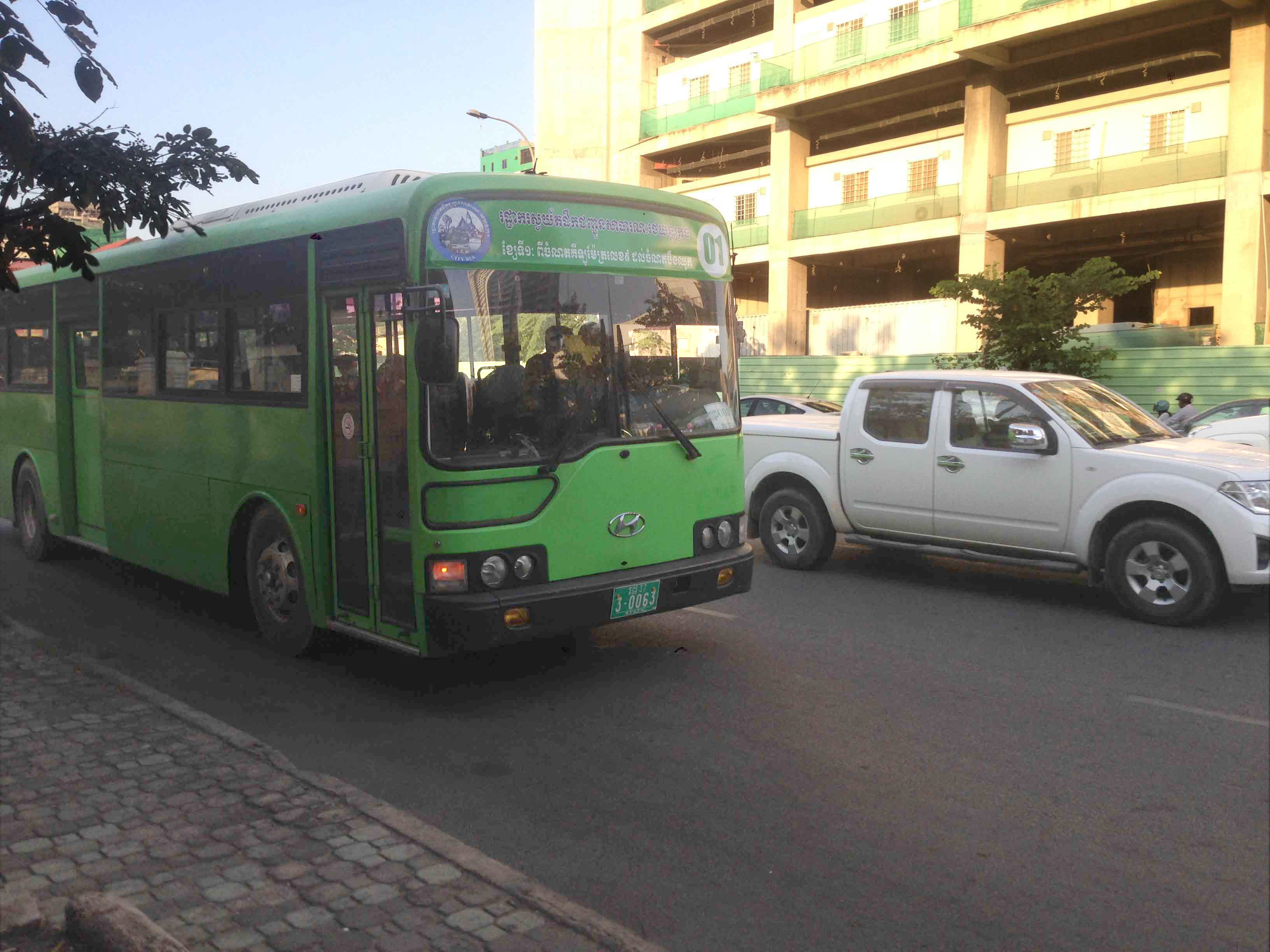
Phnom Penh BRT bus approaching Monivong-Sihanouk station

Phnom Penh is served by air conditioned public buses. Initial attempts by the Japanese government to develop a Phnom Penh bus service began in 2001. An update of the JICA urban transport master plan for Phnom Penh was completed and implemented in 2014. The city is later served by 21 bus lines, operated by the Phnom Penh municipal government. Private transportation within the city include the cycle rickshaw, known in Khmer as "cyclo", the motorcycle taxi known in Khmer as "moto", the auto rickshaw known locally as "tuk-tuk", the trailer attached to a motorcycle taxi known in Khmer as "remorque", and the standard automobile taxicab known in Khmer as "taxi".

=== Railway ===
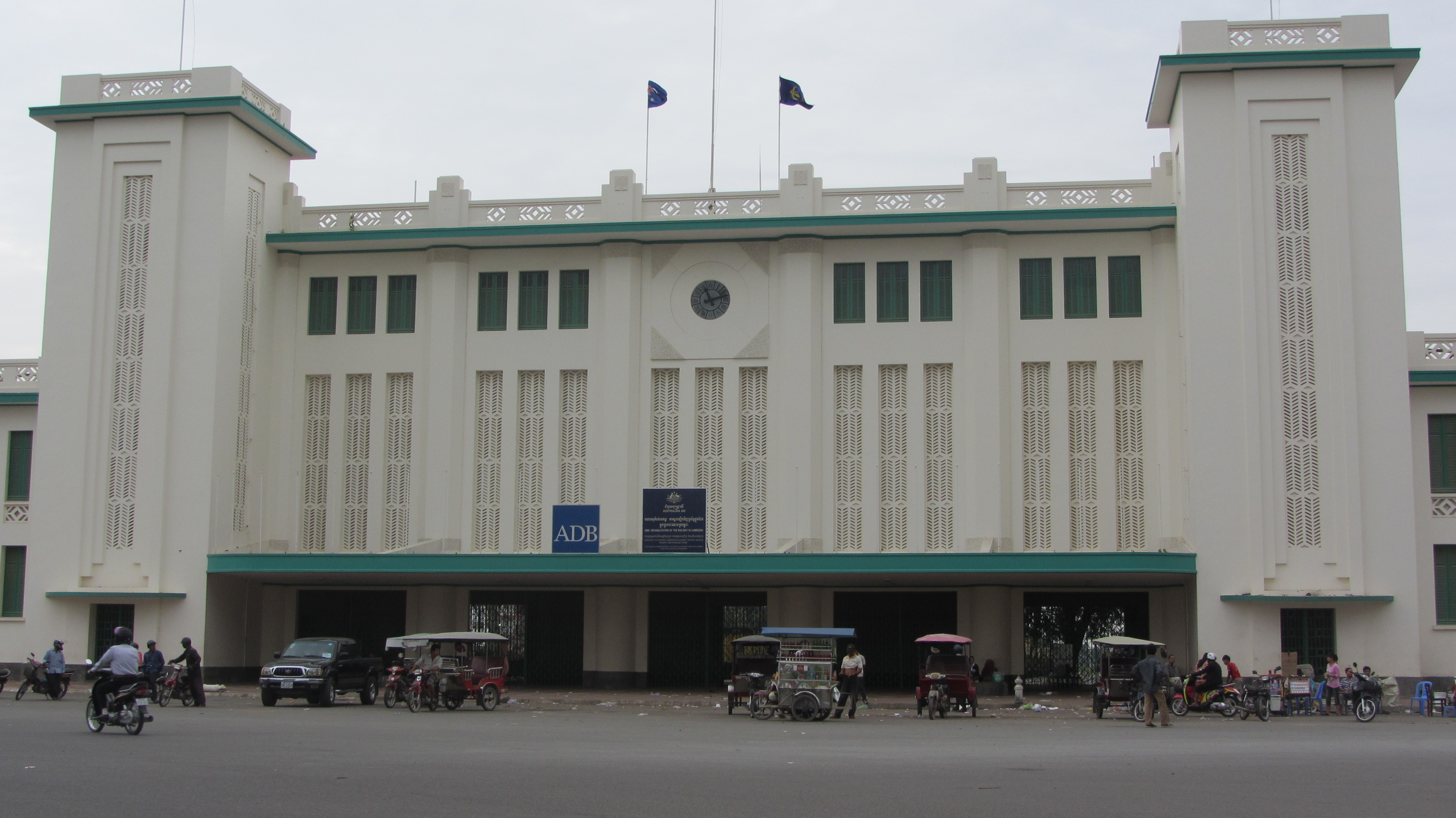
Phnom Penh Railway Station (2012)

Scheduled passenger train services between Phnom Penh and Sihanoukville resumed in May 2016 after having been suspended for 14 years.

=== Highways ===
As the capital of Cambodia, a number of national highways connect the city with parts of the country:

National Highway	Code	Length		Origin	Terminal
National Highway 1	10001	167.10 km	103.83 mi	Phnom Penh	Vietnamese Border
National Highway 2	10002	120.60 km	74.94 mi	Phnom Penh	Vietnamese Border
National Highway 3	10003	202.00 km	125.52 mi	Phnom Penh	Veal Renh
National Highway 4	10004	226.00 km	140.43 mi	Phnom Penh	Sihanoukville
National Highway 5	10005	407.45 km	253.18 mi	Phnom Penh	Thai Border
National Highway 6	10006	416.00 km	258.49 mi	Phnom Penh	Banteay Meanchey
National Highway 7	10007	509.17 km	316.38 mi	Skun (Cheung Prey District)	Lao Border

In 2023, a new expressway linking Phnom Penh with Sihanoukville came into operation. The expressway was built by China, which has a role in infrastructure development in Cambodia through the Belt and Road Initiative.

== Water supply ==
Water supply in Phnom Penh has improved in terms of access, service quality, efficiency, cost recovery and governance between 1993 and 2006. The number of customers has increased ninefold, service quality has improved from intermittent to continuous supply, water losses have been cut and the city's water utility went from being bankrupt to making a profit. These achievements were recognized through international awards such as the 2006 Ramon Magsaysay Award and the 2010 Stockholm Industry Water Award.

== Twin towns – sister cities ==
Phnom Penh is twinned with:

- Bangkok, Thailand
- Beijing, China
- Busan, South Korea
- Chongqing, China
- Cleveland, Tennessee, United States
- Hanoi, Vietnam
- Hefei, China
- Ho Chi Minh City, Vietnam
- Incheon, South Korea
- Kitakyushu, Japan
- Kunming, China
- Long Beach, United States
- Lowell, United States
- Shanghai, China
- Shenzhen, China
- Shantou, China

== Bibliography ==
- Groslier, B.P. (2006). Angkor And Cambodia In the Sixteenth Century. Bangkok: Orchid Press.
- Igout, Michel; Dubuisson, Serge (1993). Phnom Penh Then and Now. Bangkok: White Lotus. ISBN 978-974-8495-84-2. OCLC 29795478.
- LeBoutillier, Kris; Ariff, Shahida (2004). Journey Through Phnom Penh: A Pictorial Guide to the Jewel of Cambodia. Singapore: Times Editions. ISBN 978-981-232-596-9. OCLC 55501046.
- Leroy, Joakim; Hoskin, John (2005). AZU's Dreams of Cambodia. Phnom Penh. Hong Kong: AZU Editions Ltd. ISBN 978-988-98140-2-1. OCLC 62328690.
- Kolnberger, Thomas (2020). Continuity and change: Transformations in the urban history of Phnom Penh, Cambodia, in: Southeast Asian Transformations. Urban and Rural Developments in the 21st Century, pp. 219–239, ed. by S. Kurfürst and S. Wehner. Transcript (Bielefeld). hdl:10993/43963.
