= Wat Phnom Daily =

Khmer language newspaper in Cambodia

Wat Phnom Daily is a Khmer language newspaper published in Cambodia with its headquarters in Phnom Penh.
