= Vann Molyvann House =

- ផ្ទះវីឡារបស់លោកតាវណ្ណម៉ូលីវណ្ណ
- Interactive map of the Vann Molyvann House area

General information
- Type: Family home
- Architectural style: New Khmer Architecture
- Location: Mao Tse Doung Boulevard, Phnom Penh
- Coordinates: 11.544189707821268°N 104.91346965638859°E
- Completed: 1966

Design and construction
- Architect: Vann Molyvann

The Vann Molyvann House is a landmark of the city of Phnom Penh built in 1966 by Khmer architect Vann Molyvann as his private house and architecture office. It has been dubbed as the "Cambodian Taliesin" and praised as a "testimony to the unique ability of Southeast Asia's greatest living architect to fuse European modernism with traditional Khmer design in an apparently seamless style." In 2025, the house was opened as a branch of Brown Coffee.

== Location ==
Located along Mao Tse Tung Boulevard on the corner of Street 163, in the inner ring of Phnom Penh, the surrounding environment of the house, which used to be the outskirts at the time of construction, is now "one of the most coveted commercial streets of the burgeoning city". The Vann Molyvann house occupies 924 square meters of land. Its New Khmer Architecture style is quite different from other buildings in the area that are largely composed of rectangular townhouse-style shops, as opposed to the traditional Khmer residences in the neighbourhood that were there at the time of its construction. Today, these surroundings have mostly been replaced by Vietnamese-style tube or matchbox houses and high-rising buildings which somewhat suffocate this historical landmark to the extent that the house is "unnoticed to most passers’ by and is hard to locate in Phnom Penh’s urban chaos."

== History ==
=== Building a short-lived dream house ===
Like most architects, Vann Molyvann, wanted to design his own house. While his public works earned him his status as the Kingdom's most prominent architect, his previous projects required him to take public use into consideration. When it came to the design of his personal residence, however, Vann Molyvann recalled the opportunity as a "chance to play". Built in 1966, he used the house both as his family home and as the place where he created most of his great projects for the new Phnom Penh.

Downstairs on the ground floor was his atelier workshop and so [it] was actually like the birthplace of lots of milestones in New Khmer Architecture.

— Martin Aerne, architecture professor at the Royal University of Fine Arts

After living in the house for less than five short years, the Molyvann family moved to Switzerland for safety in 1971 as the Civil War broke out in Cambodia.

=== Surviving the destruction of communism and war ===
After Vann Molyvann left Cambodia in 1971, the house was rented to building contractor Comin Khmer, which then sublet it to a Danish man. During the Pol Pot era it was abandoned. The Department of Urban Planning and Construction later used the building, without securing the necessary restorations.

=== Recovering a lost property ===
By the time the couple returned to Cambodia in 1993, after the restoration of monarchy and democracy, the furniture had gone and the house was in a poor condition. Vann Molyvann's application to the government to have his house restored as his personal property was granted by the Royal Government of Cambodia with the support of King Norodom Sihamoni.

=== Uncertain future of a national monument ===
In 2004, Vann Molyvann moved to Siem Reap where he built houses inspired by the same design with the same typical urban relationship at a 45° angle to the road. Since then, his house in Phnom Penh has once again faced an uncertain fate. The new residents were criticized for their habitation which was disrespectful of the esthetics of the residence.

In 2014, social networks in Cambodia were concerned to see the "building gutted and strewn with rubble"; a plan to turn the house into a design showroom did not last. By 2020, the house was put up for sale at the price of seven million dollars.

Just like some of his achievements such as the Council of Ministers that was demolished in 2008 or the Preah Suramarit National Theater after a devastating fire, it is now feared that, due to urban development and land speculation, this house will suffer the same fate or be transformed into a shopping center or offices. In March 2025, it was announced that the house would be transformed into one of the flagship branches of Brown Coffee, blending history with modern cafe culture.

== Architecture ==
=== Style: New Khmer Architecture ===
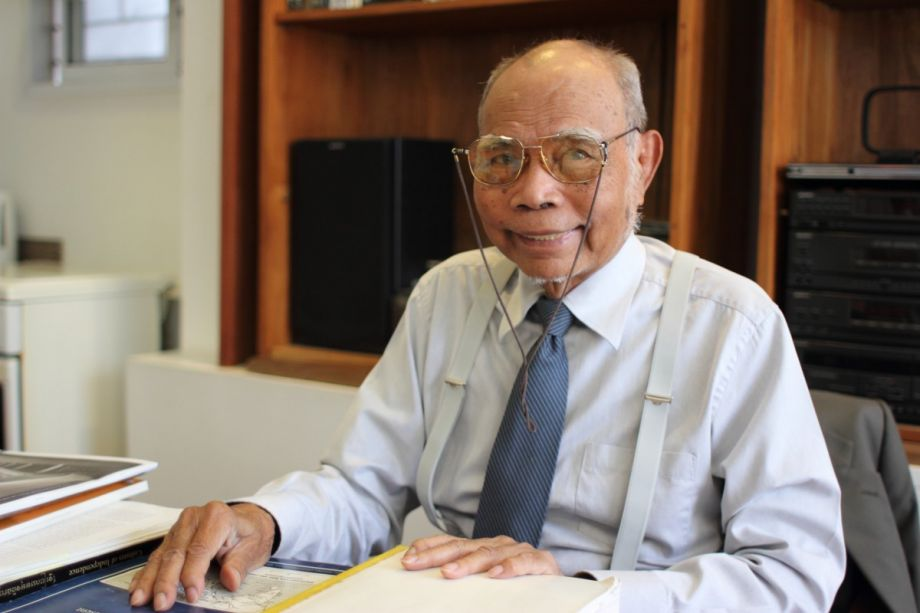
Portrait of the architect Vann Molyvann

The Vann Molyvann house is a "seamless blend of modern and traditional forms" in a way that is emblematic of the New Khmer Architecture. Its proportions were designed using the anthropometric scale of proportions of the Modulor conceived by French architect Le Corbusier. Gérald Hanning contributed to the Modulor when working with Le Corbusier in the 1940s. He was a friend and UN urban consultant, who introduced Vann Molyvann to it in the early 1960s. .

=== Urban Statement ===
The most unique aspect of this approximately 420m2 building is the way it is sited in relation to Mao Tse Tung Bd. Seen from the street, the house seems to be at a 45-degree angle to the road. This is because although the ground floor is orthogonal to the road, the upper levels are at a 45-degree angle to the base, so that all four facades of the domestic part of the house benefit from a good aspect overlooking the garden. A classic orthogonal plan would have resulted in two sides facing the neighbours' walls in this relatively narrow plot of land.

=== Structure: the Khmer accomplishment of reinforced concrete ===
While reinforced concrete had been in use for many years in Cambodia as illustrated in the Cathedral of Phnom Penh blown up by the Khmer Rouge, the house of Vann Molyvann shows a certain accomplishment in the use of more complex reinforced concrete structures. The main structure of the Vann Molyvann House combines reinforced concrete, with brick facing, as in many of his others buildings such as St. Michael's Church in Sihanoukville. The double-roof hyperbolic parabolic concrete shell covered with flat terracotta tiles on the outside and wood on the inside, was engineered by Vann's engineer brother-in-law, Walter Amberg. The walls are finished with red facing brick. A horizontal band of glass around the perimeter of the house in the inside provides the impression that the roof is slightly hoovering over the wall, increasing the impression of lightness despite the structure being made of reinforced concrete.

=== Spaces ===
The typical V-shaped beams can be seen at the Vann Molyvann House, as on the Chaktomuk Conference Hall.

The spacious living room, dining room and kitchen, each defined by a few steps and balustrades, are housed directly under the dynamic span of the hyperbolic parabolic roof. The internal space of the whole house is an intricate puzzle comprising five split levels accessed by a double staircase. The intermediate levels comprise a master bedroom with ensuite bathroom which Molyvann designed for himself and his wife, a second large bedroom with bathroom for his two daughters and four smaller bedrooms with two bathrooms for his four sons. All the bedrooms had tatamis and additional space for study and play. The ground floor level houses the architect's atelier, staff quarters, a car port and entrance porch.

=== Tropical climate and lighting ===
True to his style, Vann Molyvann also designed his home with the tropical climate in mind, windows for cross-ventilation of the spacious interiors and design features allowing his "light-filled house" to be shielded from direct sun exposure allowing the light diffuse without overwhelming the space with heat.

== Legacy ==
=== Mirroring the soul of Vann Molyvann ===
It could be said that "an architect’s own house is like a mirror of his soul". The complexity of the design and detail reveals how much attention Vann Molyvann paid to his family life, but its originality demonstrates how, liberated of the constraints of a public commission, he experimented with risky concepts and construction techniques that he would not have done otherwise. Most of all it demonstrates how his architecture does not fit into any stereo-type design school. Vann Molyvann's architecture is Vann Molyvann style!

=== A time capsule of Khmer society in 1960 ===
While Vann Molyvann's house "mirrors the creative 1960s era" in terms of Khmer architecture, it also reveals a break-away from Khmer rural lifestyles. While the traditional Khmer house is a common house where spaces are shared by all the residents, Vann Molyvann's city house reflects his idea of family life by creating specific spaces for each of his six children. Grouped two by two, each bedroom had an additional space for study and play. The master bedroom has an extra wing to accommodate ‘the last baby’. This architecture therefore shows the drift towards a modern society which gave more space to the individual as well as balance between work and leisure.

=== Inspiring the future of Khmer architecture ===
While its future is still uncertain, the emotion that the sale of the house has revealed the attachment to this architectural legacy as young Khmer architects still look up to this iconic house for guidance as to what will determine the future of Cambodian architecture.

== Bibliography ==
- Grant Ross, Helen, "The House that Vann Molyvann built ", Journal of South East Asian Architecture 9, Singapore University, April 2007
- Grant Ross, Helen (2006). Building Cambodia : new Khmer architecture, 1953–1970. Darryl Collins. Bangkok: Key Pub. ISBN 974-93412-1-X. OCLC 170404898.
