= Metal Strings =

2024 Khmer, English music documentary

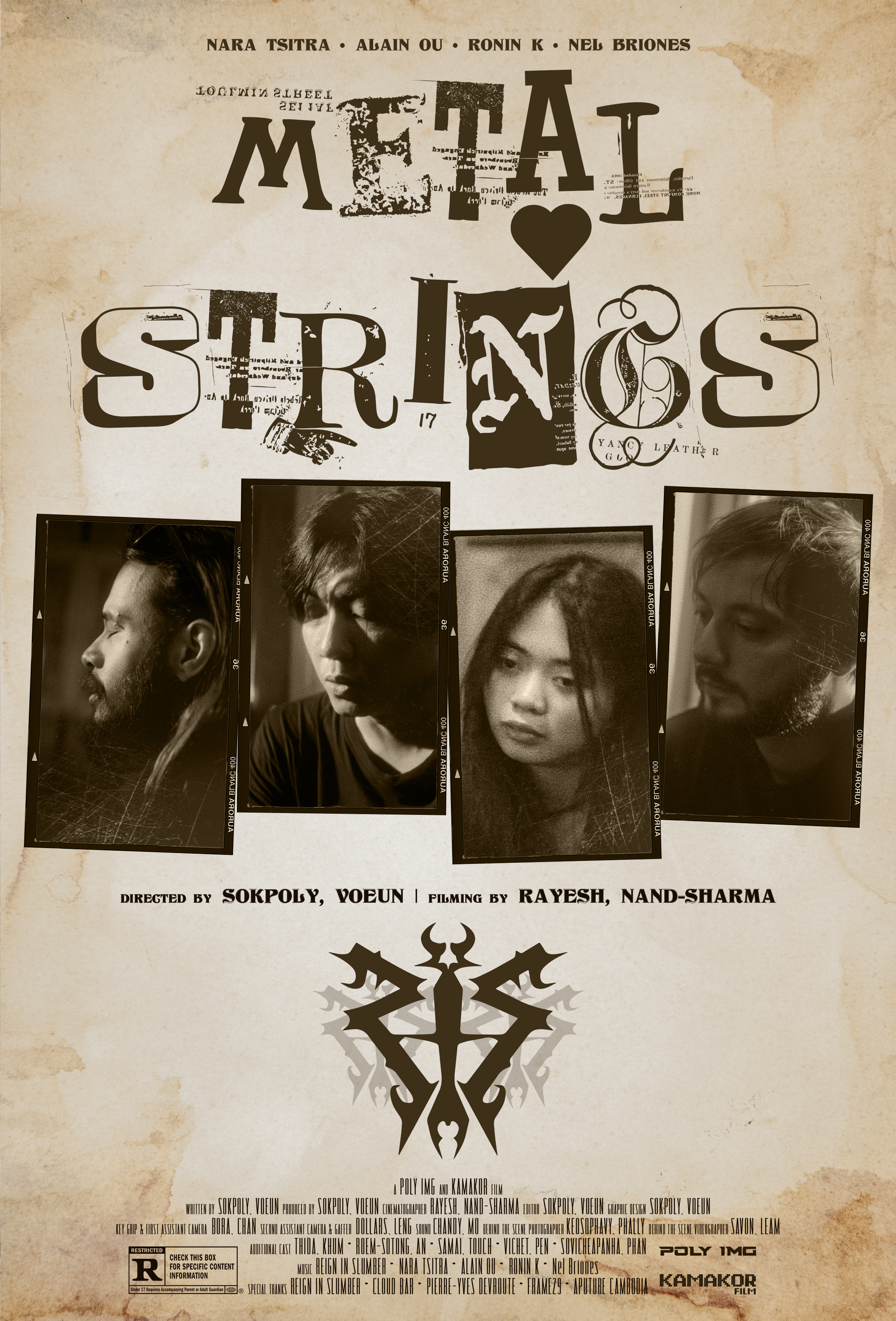
- Screening release poster
- Directed by: Sokpoly Voeun
- Written by: Sokpoly Voeun
- Produced by: Sokpoly Voeun
- Starring: Alain Ou; Nara Tsutra; Nel Briones; Ronin Kemp
- Cinematography: Rayesh, Nand-Sharma
- Edited by: Sokpoly Voeun
- Music by: Reign in Slumber
- Production company: Poly Img
- Distributed by: Kamakor Film
- Release dates: May 5, 2024 (Phnom Penh, Cambodia)
- Running time: 25 minutes
- Countries: Khmer, English

Metal Strings is a 2024 music documentary directed by Sokpoly Voeun. The film supports local artists in Cambodia and conveys motivational messages to a global audience.

== Storyline ==
Nara stands as a member of Reign in Slumber, a Cambodian metal band. Alongside fellow bandmates Alain, Ronin, Tin, and Nel, Nara is dedicated to preserving their music genre. They confront challenges such as artist discrimination, societal toxicity, and the struggle for survival, all while striving to educate those who may not fully comprehend their artistic endeavors.

== Cast ==
=== Main Cast ===
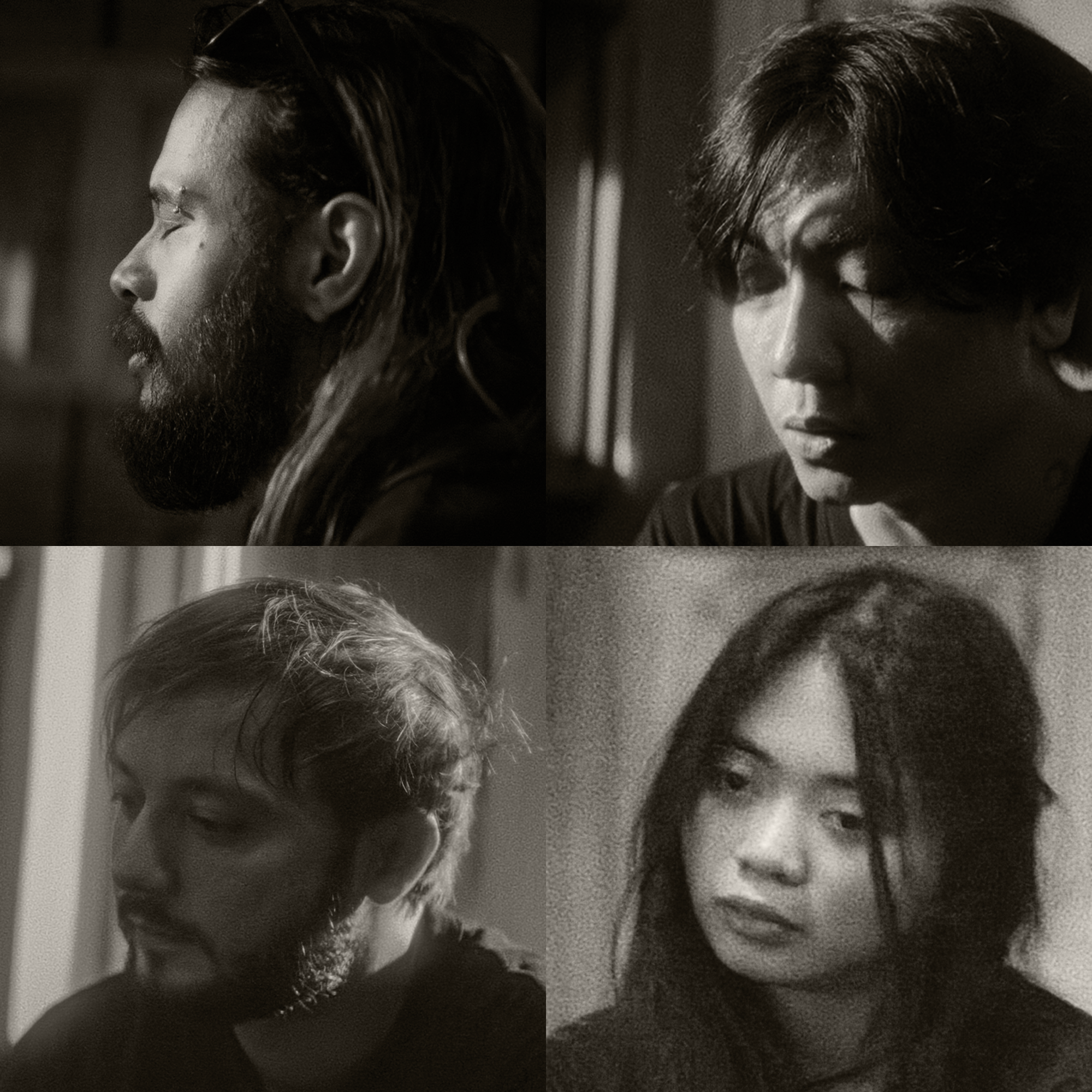
Reign in Slumber

Alain Ou is the founder and drummer of the band Silent6, predating the formation of Reign in Slumber. He has also collaborated with Doch Chkae as a vocalist.

Nara Tsutra plays bass for the band.

Nel Briones, a metal vocalist from the Philippines, is also part of the band. She is known for her work with another project called White Widow, founded by Chester Masangya and herself, which has been active since 2019. White Widow has collaborated with various artists and released multiple works, including 'Holographic Genocide' in April 2021 through Black Ring Rituals, featuring artwork by Roman Soleno and John Ivan Pollo. Nel joined Reign in Slumber in 2023, following the Slam City Seam Reap Festival.

Ronin Kemp, also known as Ronin, is the guitarist from the UK.

=== Additional cast ===
Vanntin Hoeurn is a former member of Silent6 and Reign in Slumber, appearing in old footage in the film. Mourin Terry is part of the background cast. Pheakta Mony plays the role of a bartender. Thida Khum, Roem-Sotong An, Samai Touch, Vichet Pen, and Sovicheapanha Phan are among the crowd members.

== Production ==
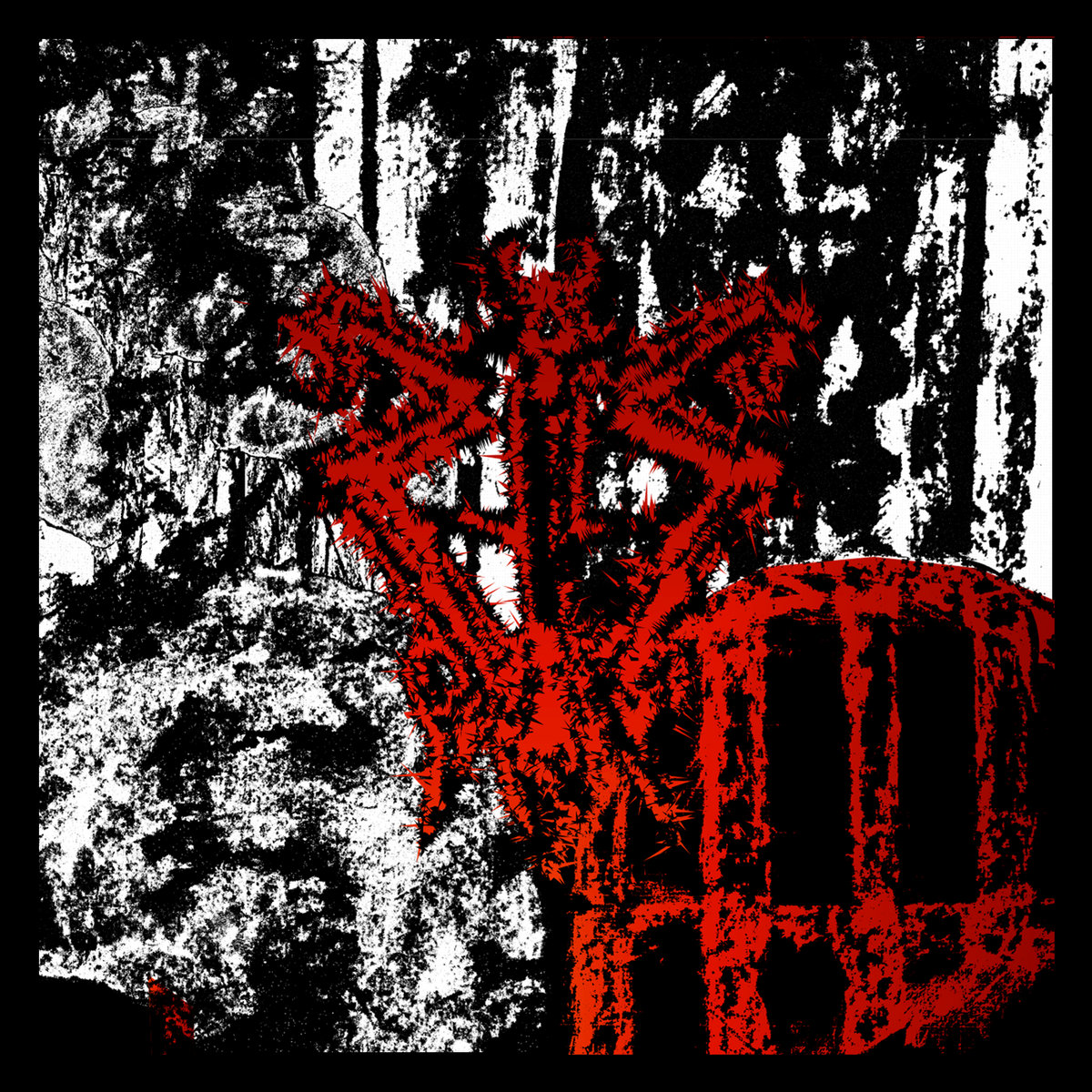
S-T Demo Album Cover

The filming began on April 6, 2024, at Cloud Bar in Phnom Penh, Cambodia, under the direction of Sokpoly Voeun. Production concluded on April 7, 2024, with post-production beginning on April 8, 2024, and wrapping up on April 25, 2024.

=== Music ===
Sokpoly Voeun has chosen to incorporate "Stave Nation Army" by Reign in Slumber from their album "ST/Demo," released on April 4, 2019. The album includes four additional tracks: "Fuck Off And Rot (featuring Mia Priest)," "Witch's Dust," "Altered State," and "Contrition." Also featured is a new original soundtrack titled "Metal Strings" from Reign in Slumber's 2024 album "Isles of Perdition," which includes "Traces."

"Stave Nation Army" and "Metal Strings" were composed by Alain Ou and performed by Nara Tsutra, Nel Briones, Ronin Kemp, Vanntin Hoeurn, and Alain Ou.

== Release ==
“Metal Strings” premiered at the Cloud Metal Film Fest in Cloud Restaurant Phnom Penh, Cambodia, on June 12, 2024. The event featured an official selection by Cloud, with various artists and filmmakers in attendance, including Reign in Slumber, the film’s crew, and music artists. Metal Strings at the 13th Cambodia International Film Festival (CIFF) opened with a grand gala at Chaktomuk Theatre on June 25, bringing together a diverse array of filmmakers, artists and cultural enthusiasts from around the world.

== Accolades ==
List of Awards
Year	Award	Category	Recipient(s)	Result	Ref.
2024	Cloud Metal Film Fest	Premiere	Metal Strings	Premiere	
2024	Cloud Metal Film Fest	Official Selected	Metal Strings	Selected	
2024	Cambodia International Film Festival	Best Cambodia Documentaries	Metal Strings	Selected	
2024	AltFF Alternative Film Festival	Best Poster	Metal Strings	Won	
2024	Athens International Monthly Art Film Festival	Best Documentary	Metal Strings	Won	
2024	Athens International Monthly Art Film Festival	Best Cinematographer	Sokpoly Voeun, Rayesh Nand-Sharma	Finalist	
2024	Athens International Monthly Art Film Festival	Best Directing	Sokpoly Voeun	Finalist	
2024	Lane Doc Fest	Doc Short - Humanity	Metal Strings	Finalist	
2025	Kuala Lumpur International Film Festival	Documentary	Metal Strings	Selected	
2025	Kuala Lumpur International Film Festival	Short Film	Metal Strings	Selected	
2025	Kuala Lumpur International Film Festival	Continent-Based	Metal Strings	Selected	
