= New Khmer Architecture =

Cambodian architectural movement in the 1950s and 1960s

Chaktomuk Conference Hall, Phnom Penh

New Khmer Architecture (Khmer: ស្ថាបត្យកម្មខ្មែរថ្មី) was an architectural movement in Cambodia during the 1950s and 1960s. The style blended elements of the Modern movement with two distinctly Cambodian traditions: the great Khmer tradition of Angkor and the vernacular architecture tradition of domestic buildings. The term was coined by authors Helen Grant Ross and Darryl Leon Collins.

The Kingdom of Cambodia gained independence from France in 1953. Winning the elections in 1955, Prince Norodom Sihanouk founded the Sangkum Reastr Niyum, a political experiment in economic development that specifically developed this art and architectural style. It reached its apotheosis in the 1960s and ended abruptly in 1970 with the overthrow of Norodom Sihanouk by General Lon Nol.

== Historic overview ==
The driving force behind the movement was Norodom Sihanouk, who served as King of Cambodia from 1953 to 1955, Prime Minister from 1955 to 1960, Head of State from 1960 to 1970. Sihanouk was also a composer, writer, poet, filmmaker and patron of the arts. Following Cambodia's independence in 1953, he promoted the development and modernization of the country, including in agriculture, infrastructure, industry, education, health care, tourism to the arts. Initially, foreign influences were evident in the movement's architecture, but Cambodial architects, many of whom had studied abroad, increasingly incorporated traditional Cambodian elements into modernist designs.

During the 1960s Phnom Penh with its many buildings in the style of New Khmer Architecture, was called the 'Pearl of the East'. During a visit to the city in the 1960s, Lee Kuan Yew, Prime Minister of the Republic of Singapore from 1959 to 1990, was so impressed he expressed his desire for Singapore to develop along similar lines.

== Present and future ==
Although the East of Cambodia was badly hit by American bombing with towns such as Kampong Cham and Kampot including their universities and hospitals being razed, many New Khmer Architecture buildings in Phnom Penh and across the country survived the years of war and devastation remarkably intact. Unfortunately ruthless liberalism and the current period of high economic growth are proving to be a much greater threat. The magnificent Preah Suramarit National Theatre, which partially burned down in 1994 after welding repairs accidentally set fire to the roof and the Council of Ministers, have already been destroyed in the speculative rush to cash in on the rise in the value of land. Not just buildings of the 1950s and 1960s, but also buildings from the colonial period are threatened. Many buildings built during the period are in poor shape. The National Sports Complex is especially vulnerable. Even though it is still in regular use, a recent "renovation" was extremely superficial. The moats surrounding the stadium, integral part of the design for flood prevention, have been or are being filled with shoddy new constructions. Of the two apartment blocks on the Front de Bassac, the so-called 'White Building' was demolished in 2015; the other has been encapsulated in concrete and has lost all its distinct features. Only a few buildings in the style are in good condition and regularly used; the Chamkarmon Compound (part of the Senate), Chaktomuk Conference Hall and Chenla Theatre, for example. Confounding the situation is the fact that many Cambodians, especially those in power, do not recognize the cultural value of this architecture. On the contrary, many – erroneously – see it as something foreign, because "it's too modern (...) and is not understood as being an expression of a vital time in Cambodia's history". Currently there are a small group of people, mainly foreigners, who are trying to raise awareness in an effort to save the remaining sites. A new generation of Cambodian architecture students are also aware of the situation.

== Characteristics of the style ==
There are several typical elements that characterize the style.

From the Modernist movement, the style uses reinforced concrete and assertive structures.

Elements of vernacular tradition include adaptations to the local tropical climate. Traditional Cambodian houses are usually raised on columns. This makes for an open, shaded space for social activities and a natural cooling effect. The height of the building offers protection in times of floods. New Khmer Architecture often uses these features. Other adaptations are the use of wall panels, double walls and roofs (especially the typical VVV- shaped roofs that can be found on many buildings of the style) to prevent direct sunlight. Loggias (covered balconies and walkways) and claustras (decorative openwork) offer shade. Particular attention was paid to the creation of natural ventilation to cool the building. Traditional houses also have an open floor plan, another feature in many New Khmer Architecture buildings. Many of them are light, white (another adaptation to climate) and open. Like traditional houses, the structure and foundation of New Khmer Architecture buildings are not hidden. The structure's often used as an integral part of the building, and forms a decorative element.

Many buildings are infused with Cambodian culture and everyday life. Sometimes elements of traditional temples are used, like multi-tiered tiled roofs, golden spires, tympani (gables) and roof ornaments. Sometimes a traditional object formed an inspiration for a design. Vann Molyvann's library at the Teacher Training College (now Institute of Foreign Languages) looks like a traditional straw hat. The Chaktomuk Conference Hall, also by Vann Molyvann, offers another example of the use of traditional objects as inspiration, with its fan shaped roof and golden spire.

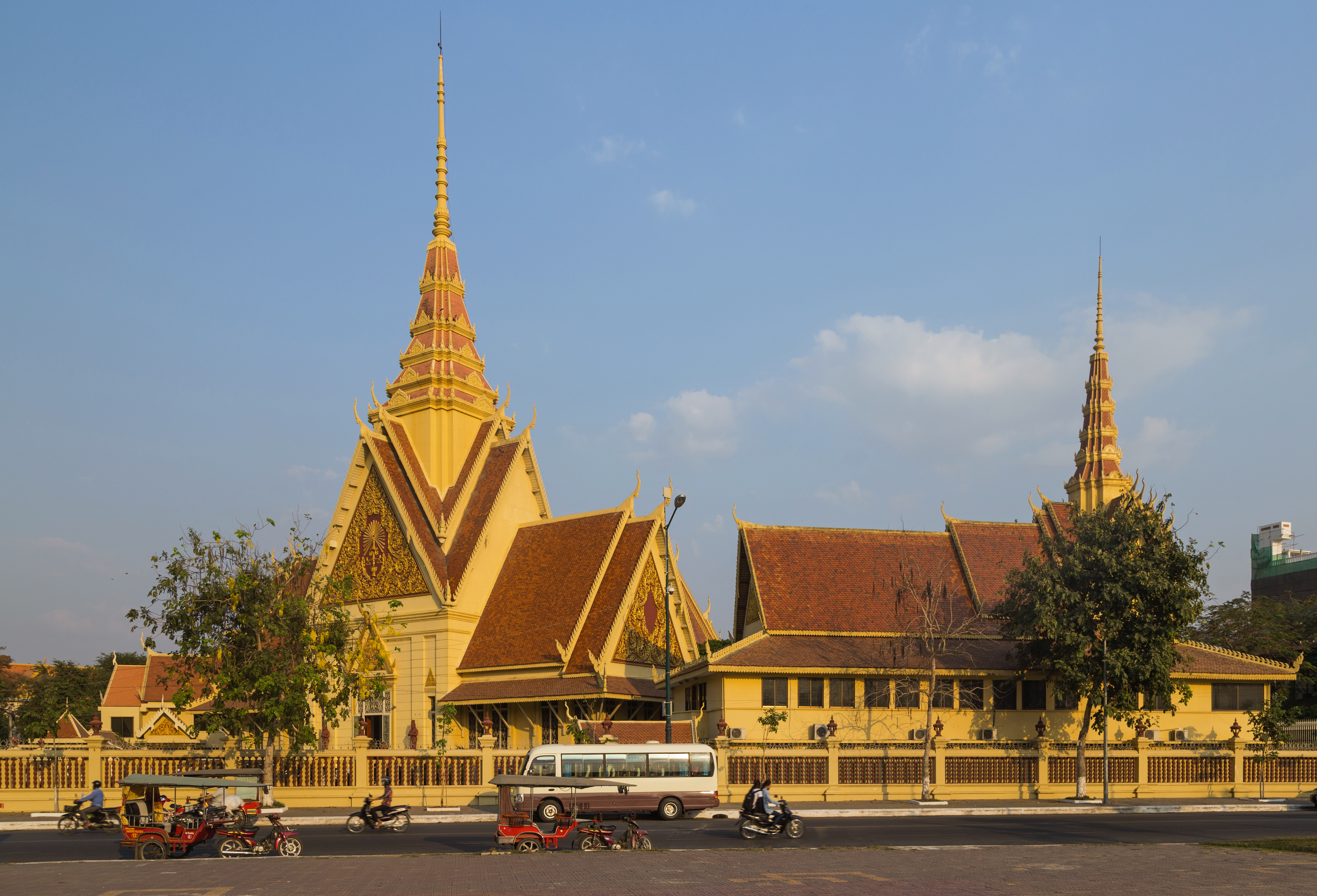
Supreme Court, former National Assembly building

The Angkor tradition suggested the use of moats and raised walkways. Moats are not only decorative, but also function as a water reservoir in rainy season, and work as a cooling device. The National Sports Complex and the Teacher Training College (now Institute of Foreign Languages) are prime examples of this approach.

Late colonial architecture, especially buildings such as the Central Market and Phnom Penh Railway Station, had an influence in the innovative use of reinforced concrete.

Government buildings, state residences, factories, schools and universities, health centers and hospitals, sports complexes, exhibition halls, cinemas and theaters, airports and train stations, churches, private houses and social housing projects, even stupas and monuments were built in the style. Although the most impressive examples can be found in Phnom Penh, the country's provincial capitals and other towns benefitted from the national effort to modernize the whole country. Most projects were funded from the national budget or private Cambodian funds, because as Sihanouk declared 'I do not want to indebt my children'. International technical assistance was accepted from the UN and foreign governments, such as the United States of America, the USSR, and China. Two UN experts, Vladimir Bodiansky and Gérald Hanning, provided valuable technical support in the early 1960s to the point that Vann Molyvann said they were his masters. Gérald Hanning who had participated in the Modulor, Le Corbusier's famous tool for proportion, initiated Vann Molyvann to it. After that he used it in all his designs.

== Important architects ==
When Cambodia gained independence from France, there were no competent Cambodian architects or engineers in the entire former colony. Gradually, young talented architects returned from abroad. Absolutely inexperienced, they are immediately loaded with the most taxable workload. Meanwhile, the technical and engineering schools have started training engineers and technicians. But it was not until 1965 that architecture began to be taught at the newly established Royal University of Fine Arts, where the most famous new Khmer architect, Vann Molyvann, was hired as Rector. Other Cambodian architects who played an important role were Lu Ban Hap, Chhim Sun Fong, Seng Suntheng, Ung Krapum Phka and Mam Sophana. Many of them trained abroad, especially in France or the United States. Altogether Grant Ross and Collins (opus cit pp72) identified over 60 architects from many different origins who contributed to the work of the Sangkum Reastr Niyum: Henri Chatel, Jamshed Petigura, Leroy & Mondet, Claude Bach, to mention a few. The architects for the Khmer-Soviet Friendship Hospital in Phnom Penh were Russian; Gordienko and Erchov. In recent years, significant contributions from Japanese experts and contractors have emerged, with Gyoji Banshoya, Nobuo Goto and Setsuo Okada being recorded by Kosuke Matsubara. Dr. Lynn Emerson was an American architect who designed the School of Applied Arts and Engineering. All of this shows how the head of state used all the available intellectual power. Supported by Prince Norodom, who admires the diverse origins of these highly skilled technicians, contributes to a creative sense. Not an architect as such, Prince Sihanouk was the driving force behind the movement. He personally supervised most projects and encouraged his architects to reach their highest possible level of achievement. He also worked as an interior designer on some buildings and reviewed all the plans before approval.

== Important buildings ==
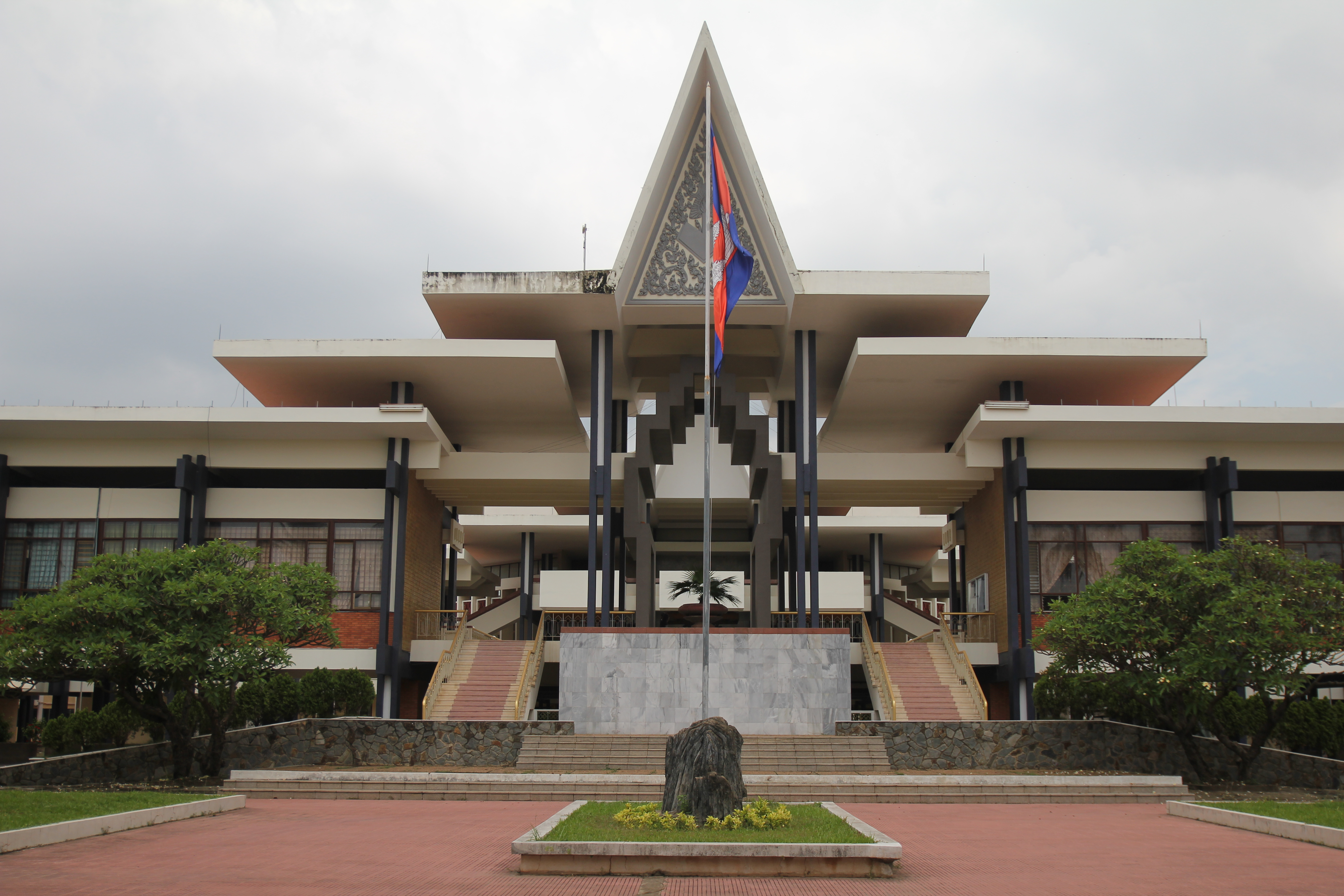
Edifice of the Royal University of Phnom Penh

Phnom Penh

- Bassac Riverfront: Municipal Apartments, Lu Ban Hap with Vladimir Bodiansky, c. 1963, demolished 2015
- Bassac Riverfront: National Bank Apartments (now part of the Russian Embassy), Henri Chatel and Jamshed Petrigura, c. 1963
- Bassac Riverfront: Olympic Village Apartments, Vann Molyvann, c. 1963
- Bassac Riverfront: Preah Suramarit National Theater, Vann Molyvann, 1968, demolished 2008
- Bassac Riverfront: Sangkum Reastr Exhibition Hall, Vann Molyvann, 1961
- Hotel Cambodiana, Chhim Sun Fong, Lu Ban Hap, Norodom Sihanouk (interior design), 1969
- Chaktomuk Conference Hall, Vann Molyvann, 1961
- Chamkarmon Compound, Lu Ban Hap, Vann Molyvann and others, 1950s-1960s
- Chenla State Cinema (now Chenla Theater), Lu Ban Hap with Chhim Sun Fong, 1969
- Council of Ministers, Vann Molyvann and Grimeret, 1950s, demolished 2008
- Independence Monument, Vann Molyvann and Ing Kieth, 1962
- Institute of Technology, Russian architects, 1964
- Khmer-Soviet Hospital, Gordienko and Erchov, 1964
- Milk factory (now Kingdom Breweries), Uk Sameth, 1970
- National Sports Complex, Vann Molyvann, Um Samuth, Gérald Hanning, Vladimir Bodiansky, Claude Duchemin, Jean-Claude Morin, 1964
- Royal University of Phnom Penh, Leroy & Mondet, 1968
- State Palace (now Senate), Vann Molyvann, 1966
- Teacher Training College (now Institute of Foreign Languages), Vann Molyvann, 1972

Battambang

- Battambang University, Ung Krapum Phka, 1968

Sihanoukville

- St. Michael's Church, Sihanoukville, 1965, A. Ahadoberry & Vann Molyvann
- Independence Hotel, Leroy & Mondet, 1968
- SKD Brewery and staff housing, Vann Molyvann, 1968
- National Bank of Cambodia and staff housing, Vann Molyvann, 1968

== See also ==
- Tropical Modernism
