= Brown Coffee =

Cambodian coffeehouse chain

Brown Coffee is a Cambodian coffeehouse chain. Brown Coffee was founded in 2009 by five cousins in their 20s, who began the company with a $150,000 loan from relatives. By the 2010s, it had become one of the country's most popular cafes, competing with international rivals like Starbucks and Gloria Jean's. It has been credited with introducing Western coffee and cafe culture to Cambodia. In 2025, it opened a branch at the former house of Cambodian architect Vann Molyvann.
