= Institute of Foreign Languages =

Institute in Phnom Penh, Cambodia

- វិទ្យាស្ថានភាសាបរទេស (Khmer); Institut des langues étrangères (French)
- Type: National
- Established: 1985
- Parent institution: Royal University of Phnom Penh
- Affiliations: ASEAN University Network; Agence Universitaire de la Francophonie
- Director: Tith Mab
- Location: Russian Federation Blvd, Phnom Penh, Cambodia; 11.569°N 104.8914°E
- Social: Facebook
- Nickname: IFL
- Website: www.rupp.edu.kh/ifl/

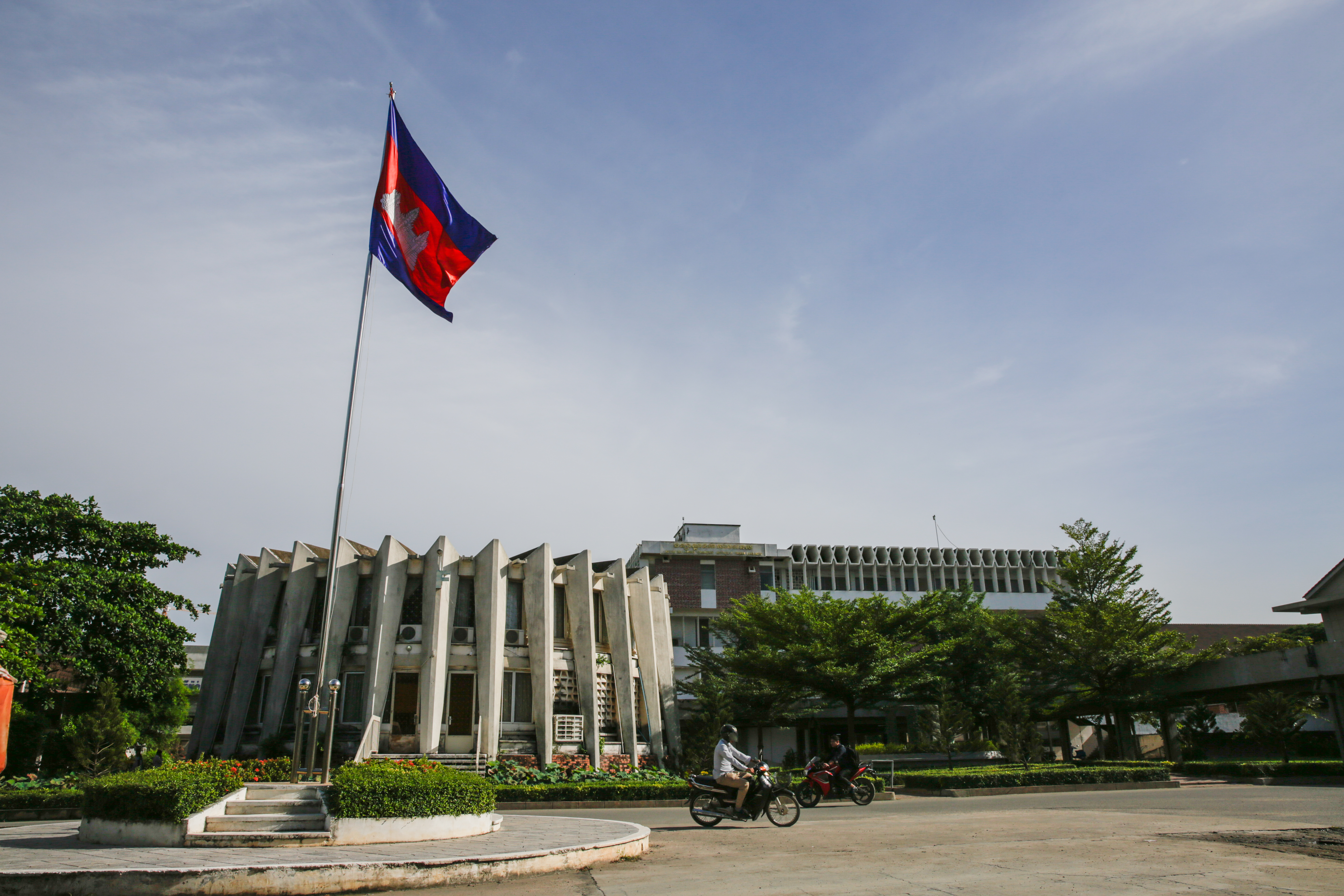
Institute of Foreign Languages.

The Institute of Foreign Languages (Note: Khmer: វិទ្យាស្ថានភាសាបរទេស, UNGEGN: Vĭtyéasthan Phéasa Bârôtés, ALA-LC: Vidyāsthān Bhāsā Parades [ʋitjiəstʰaːn pʰiəsaː ɓɑːrɔteh]; French: Institut des langues étrangères) (IFL) is an institute under the Royal University of Phnom Penh Campus. It consists of the department of Chinese, English, French, Japanese, Korean, Thai, and International Studies. Its building is in the New Khmer Architecture and was designed by Vann Molyvann.

== See also ==
- List of universities in Cambodia
- Royal University of Phnom Penh
