= Independence Monument (Cambodia) =

Monument in Phnom Penh, Cambodia

- វិមានឯករាជ្យ
- Interactive map of Independence Monument
- Location: Norodom Blvd (41), Phnom Penh (Cambodia)
- Coordinates: 11.5564°N 104.9281°E
- Designer: Vann Molyvann
- Height: 37 metres (121 ft)
- Beginning date: 1958
- Opening date: 1962
- Dedicated to: Independence from France

The Independence Monument (Khmer: វិមានឯករាជ្យ [ʋimiən ʔaekariəc]) in Phnom Penh, capital of Cambodia, was built in 1958 to memorialise Cambodia's independence from France in 1953. It stands on a roundabout in the intersection of Norodom Boulevard and Sihanouk Boulevard in the centre of the city. It is in the form of a lotus-shaped stupa, of the style seen at the temple at Banteay Srei and other Khmer historical sites. The Independence Monument was designed by the Cambodian architect Vann Molyvann, who was “personally selected and instructed” by Prince Norodom Sihanouk on how it should look like, combining “the religious and the secular.” It stands 37 metres tall.

During national celebrations, the Independence Monument is the centre of activity. A ceremonial flame on the interior pedestal is often lit by a royal or high official on these occasions, and floral tributes line the stairs. Every year, the Independence Monument is visited by foreign tourists and locals alike. Behind the monument is the Norodom Sihanouk Memorial, constructed in 2013.
