= St. Michael's Church, Sihanoukville =

Historical Catholic landmark in Sihanoukville

Coordinates: 10.6360°N 103.5164°E

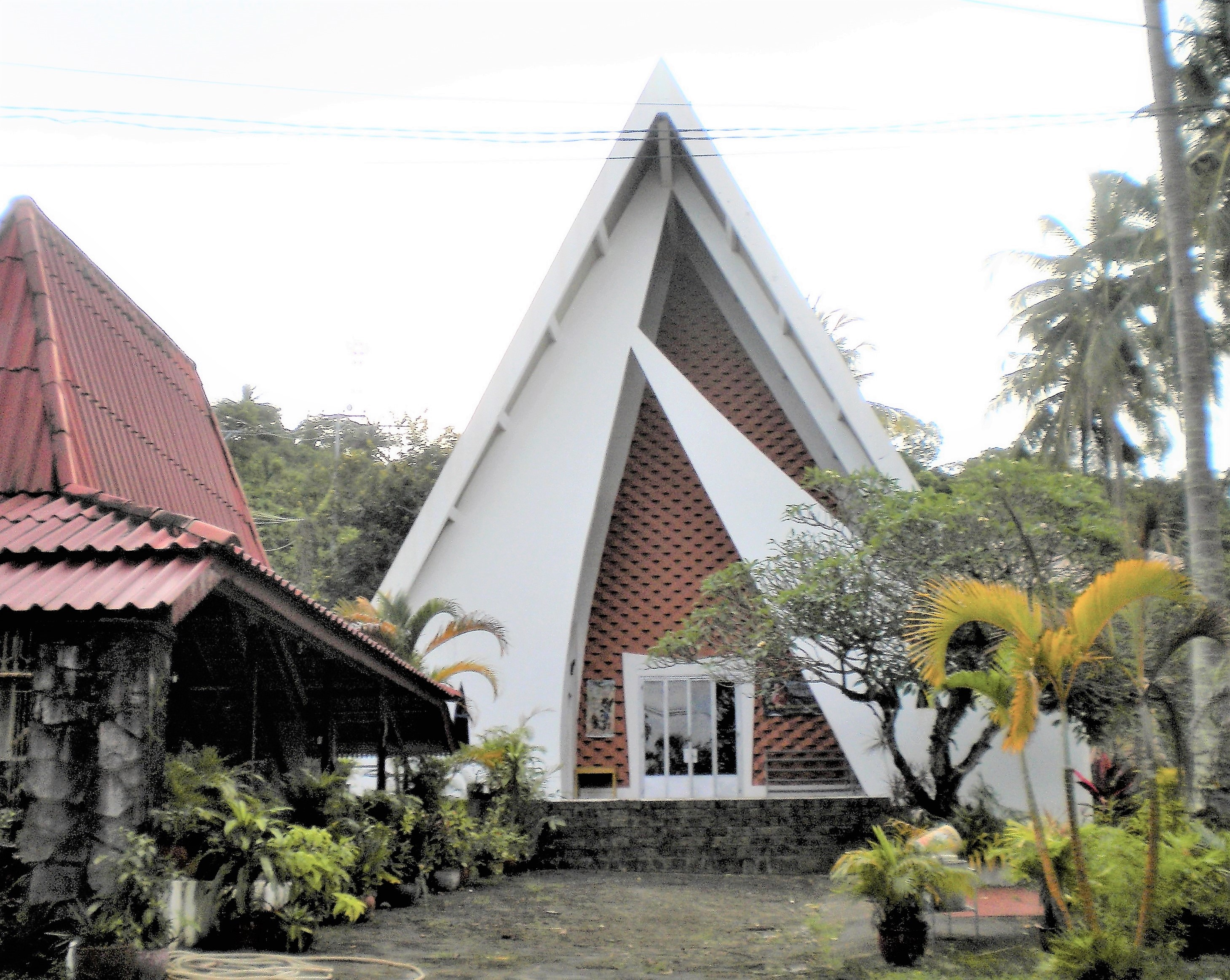
St. Michael Catholic Church in 2014.

Saint Michael's Church (French: Église Saint-Michel de Sihanoukville) is the only Roman Catholic church in the city of Sihanoukville, Cambodia. Built in the 1960s, it is one of the rare churches in Cambodia that survived the systematic destruction of churches and pagodas during the Khmer Rouge regime.

== History ==
=== A new church for a new city from 1957 to 1970 ===
Before 1956 the Catholic Church in Sihanoukville had no actual presence. The residents were few in number and non of them were known to be Christian. In 1957, a small group of French and Vietnamese Christians settled around the new port built in honour of King Sihanouk. Bishop Gustave Raballand sent Father Yves Ramousse to celebrate Easter Mass with them and from then on he endeavoured to visit them once in a while. As soon as Father Yves Ramouse ordained as Bishop of the Dioces after the retirement of Bishop Raballand, Ramousse rigorously sent a letter to King Sihanouk appealing to bequeath a piece of land in Sihanoukville for the Catholic Church. The King understood the appeal and answered favourably to the request. In 1961 King Sihanouk officially bequeathed the land for the Catholic Church. On the same year, a small Church was the inception of the Catholic Church design by Bishop Ramousse with Father Ahadoberry, a Basque priest, with the advice of the famed Cambodian architect Vann Molyvann. In 1965, the Catholic Church in Sihanoukville was completed, though during that time there were only 3 to 4 Catholic Christian families.

Father Ahabdoberry continued his apostolic work there until 1967, then he went back to France.

=== Flourishing during the time of Lon Nol in 1970-1975 ===
In 1970 -1975 during the civil war under the rule of Lon Nol. the number of residents in Sihanoukville increased, as did the number of Christians which increased to 20 families. Among them was a religious nun from Vietnam who settled near the market together with about 10 orphans whom she gathered around the market.

=== Surviving communism and transformation between 1975 and 1991 ===
From the terror and crimes of the Khmer Rouge between 1975 and 1979, the Church was shut down and all the Christians were forced into labour camps, and their faith was persecuted, even to martyrdom. No one knows how many of them survived. From 1975 until 1990, during the Communist regime, the Church was used as a pit and an animal shed, a pantry, and even as a storage room. Whereas over 50 Catholic churches and tens of Buddhist monasteries were destroyed during that time, the church in Sihanoukville was left intact in its structure, though all it interior decoration was torn.

=== A church born again from 1991 to the present day under the patronage of Saint Michael ===
In 1991, the Church became the headquarters of the UNTAC soldiers under the leadership of Colonel Leng Sound who came in order to help prepare in the national election. Some of them were Catholic Christians. The Colonel heeded the request of the soldiers for a priest to celebrate Mass with them. Bishop Yves Ramousse came and celebrated tis first Mass after the civil war in the Church. Some of the UNTAC soldiers believed in the intercession of the Archangel Saint Michael as their protector. They drew an icon of Saint Michael the Archangel in front of the church. Since then, the patronage of the Catholic Church in Sihanoukville has been given to Saint Michael. On 14 December 1993, after a long process of negotiation, Bishop Yves Ramouse was able to get the church back from the army forces. Towards the end of 1993, Christian families were increasing in numbers. Bishop Yves requested Father Robert Venet to come and take care of the church. A 2-storey house with 5 rooms was built as presbytery. From 1993 to 2001, Father Robert Venet reached out to Catholic communities in and around Sihanoukville as far as Koh Kong and Srae Ambel. He opened a hospice for boys and offered scholarship grants to the poor.

In 2012, Father Sun was the first Cambodian priest named as parish priest of Saint Michael's in Sihanoukville. The Christian community has grown steadily to include a number of Chinese faithful, following the evolving demographics of the portuary city.

== Architecture ==
The church is situated on top of the hill with a view on the bay of Sihanoukville close to the Upper Pagoda. The church of Saint Michael was built in the New Khmer Architecture style (Khmer: ស្ថាបត្យកម្មបែបថ្មី) by French missionary Ahadoberry with advice from Khmer architect Vann Molyvann. Vann Molyvann was directing two other construction sites in Sihanoukville both completed in 1968: the SKD Brewery and staff housing and the National Bank of Cambodia and staff housing. The church, considered "very original" by others missionaries at the time, makes an innovative use of reinforced concrete typical of the New Khmer architecture.

Since the late 1950, Vann Molyvann had been using A-frame prototypes to rethink Khmer Architecture. According to Michael Faelser, "following Buddhist tradition this temporary structure, [the A-frame Pavilion erected for 2,500 years of Buddha celebration, in front of Phnom Penh Railway Station] designed by Vann Molyvann, was dismantled after use." A similar A-frame had similarly been used for a market hall in Kandal Province. The A-frame church in Sihanoukville therefore reconciled the pompous concrete Cathedral of Phnom Penh which was begun in 1952, and the new A-frame as developed until then as a temporary prototype by Vann Molyvann.

Various other Christian religious buildings have adopted a similar architecture in South East Asia. Luce Memorial Chapel in Taiwan in 1963, Xavier Hall Catholic Church in Bangkok in 1972, or the Church of the Pastoral Center in Da Lat in 2010 are some examples of a similar architectural style. A-frame building which had been made popular since 1955 by Andrew Geller were built for churches across the world from the United States Air Force Academy Cadet Chapel inaugurated in 1962 to Henry's Ecumenical Art Chapel in Finland in 2005.

== See also ==
- Cathedral of Phnom Penh
- St. Joseph's Church, Phnom Penh
