= Norodom Sihanouk Memorial =

- រូបសំណាកព្រះបរមរតនកោដ្ឋ
- Interactive map of the Norodom Sihanouk Memorial area

General information
- Architectural style: Khmer
- Location: Preah Suramarit Blvd (268), Phnom Penh, Cambodia
- Coordinates: 11°33′23″N 104°55′48″E
- Completed: 2013
- Inaugurated: 11 October 2013
- Cost: US$1.2 million

Height
- Height: statue: 4.5 metres (15 ft); base: 2.7 metres (8.9 ft); monument: 27 metres (89 ft)

The Norodom Sihanouk Memorial, also called the Statue of King Father Norodom Sihanouk, is a monument commemorating former King Norodom Sihanouk located in Phnom Penh, Cambodia. The bronze statue is 4.5 meters tall and is housed under a 27 meter high stupa in the park east of the Independence Monument. The statue depicting the late king wearing a business suit cost about US$1.2 million and took about 8 months to complete. During the day the statue was inaugurated, public access to the statue was tightly monitored while armed military police were stationed near the statue in October 2013. Norodom Sihanouk died on 15 October 2012 in Beijing, China, and survived by his son, current King Norodom Sihamoni, and his wife, Norodom Monineath.

The statue is dedicated to Sihanouk's accomplishment on liberating the country on 9 November 1953 from the French colonialism.

== See also ==
- Statue of Preah Thong Neang Neak
