= Vann Molyvann =

Cambodian architect

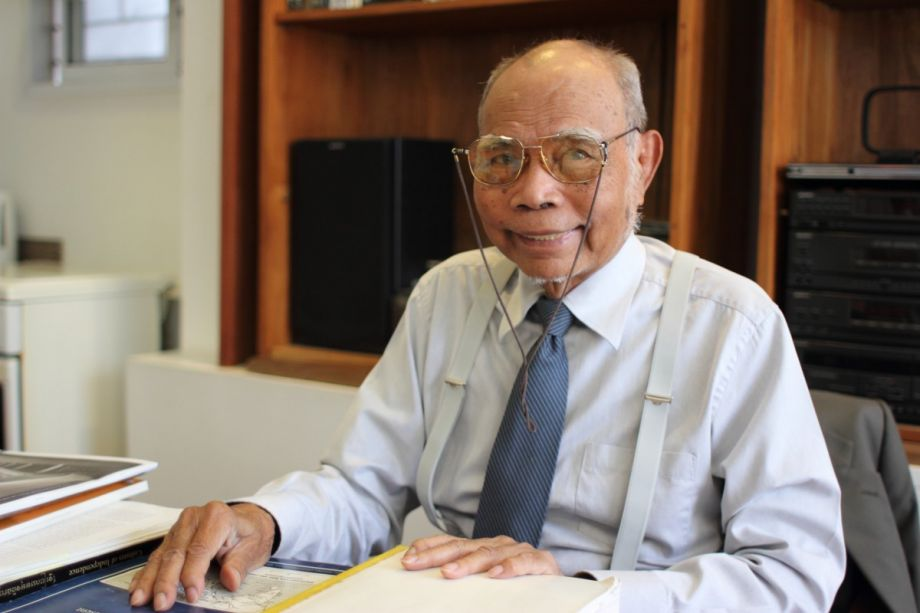
- Vann Molyvann
- Born: 23 November 1926; Ream, Kampot, Cambodia
- Died: 28 September 2017 (aged 90); Siem Reap, Cambodia
- Education: École Nationale Supérieure des Beaux-Arts
- Occupation: Architect
- Movement: New Khmer Architecture; Modernism
- Buildings: Chaktomuk Conference Hall; Independence Monument; Institute of Foreign Languages; Phnom Penh Olympic Stadium; Royal University of Phnom Penh

Vann Molyvann (Khmer: វណ្ណ ម៉ូលីវណ្ណ, romanized: Văn Molivăn; 23 November 1926 – 28 September 2017) was a Cambodian architect and urban planner. Molyvann is best known as pioneering the style known as New Khmer Architecture, which combined modernism and Khmer tradition, and accounted for the country's unique environment and irrigation needs.

During Cambodia's post-independence period between 1957 and 1970, Molyvann was appointed by Norodom Sihanouk to reshape and modernise Cambodia through the construction of new towns, infrastructure and architecture. He is credited with modernising the nation's capital Phnom Penh and designing several iconic landmarks, including the Independence Monument, Chaktomuk Conference Hall and Olympic Stadium. During the Cambodian Civil War and Pol Pot regime, he lived in exile in Switzerland, returning to Cambodia in 1991. He was appointed head of APSARA, in charge of conserving the temples of Angkor, until his dismissal in 2001 following disputes with the government. In contemporary Cambodia, many of his buildings and city plans fell into neglect or were demolished by unplanned development. He died in 2017 at age 90.

== Early life ==
Vann Molyvann was born in Ream, Kampot province, in 1926 during the French protectorate to a poor family. After being the first student to pass the Bacc II at Preah Sisowath High School in 1944, Molyvann obtained a scholarship to pursue studies in Paris, France, in 1946. After one year of law, he switched to architecture at the School of Fine Arts in Paris (École Nationale Supérieure des Beaux-Arts), after being inspired by a meeting with Henri Marchal, the curator of Angkor at the École Française d'Extrême-Orient. He studied architecture under Le Corbusier. He remained in Paris for several more years, studying from 1947 to 1954 in the Arretche studio and working as an architect. He knew Khieu Samphan, future Khmer Rouge leader, from his time as a student studying Khmer art at the Sorbonne.

== New Khmer Architecture ==
I realized that there was no need to invent anything, The Khmer had been the best of farmers, and the system of prek and boeng, or canals and ponds, truly is the irrigation system that we must perfect and continue to use.

— Vann Molyvann, 2003

Molyvann returned to Cambodia in 1956 during its Sangkum Reastr Niyum era as one of only a handful of trained Cambodian architects, whom Prince Norodom Sihanouk called on to lead the design of new state infrastructure. As the most qualified architect, Molyvann was promptly appointed Head of Public Works and State Architect. During this post-independence era, Molyvann designed and built over 100 structures, including many famous landmarks, such as Chaktomuk Conference Hall, the Council of Ministers and the State Palace in the capital. He supervised the design and construction of new towns such as Tioulongville (Kirirom) and Sihanoukville (Kompong Som) and important town plans such as the Bassac development in Phnom Penh, where a mix of cultural facilities such as the National Theatre Preah Suramarit and the Exhibition Hall neighboured with large housing experiments. He also designed many of Cambodia's embassies and exhibitions abroad. Sihanouk also commissioned low-cost housing developments in several districts of the city.

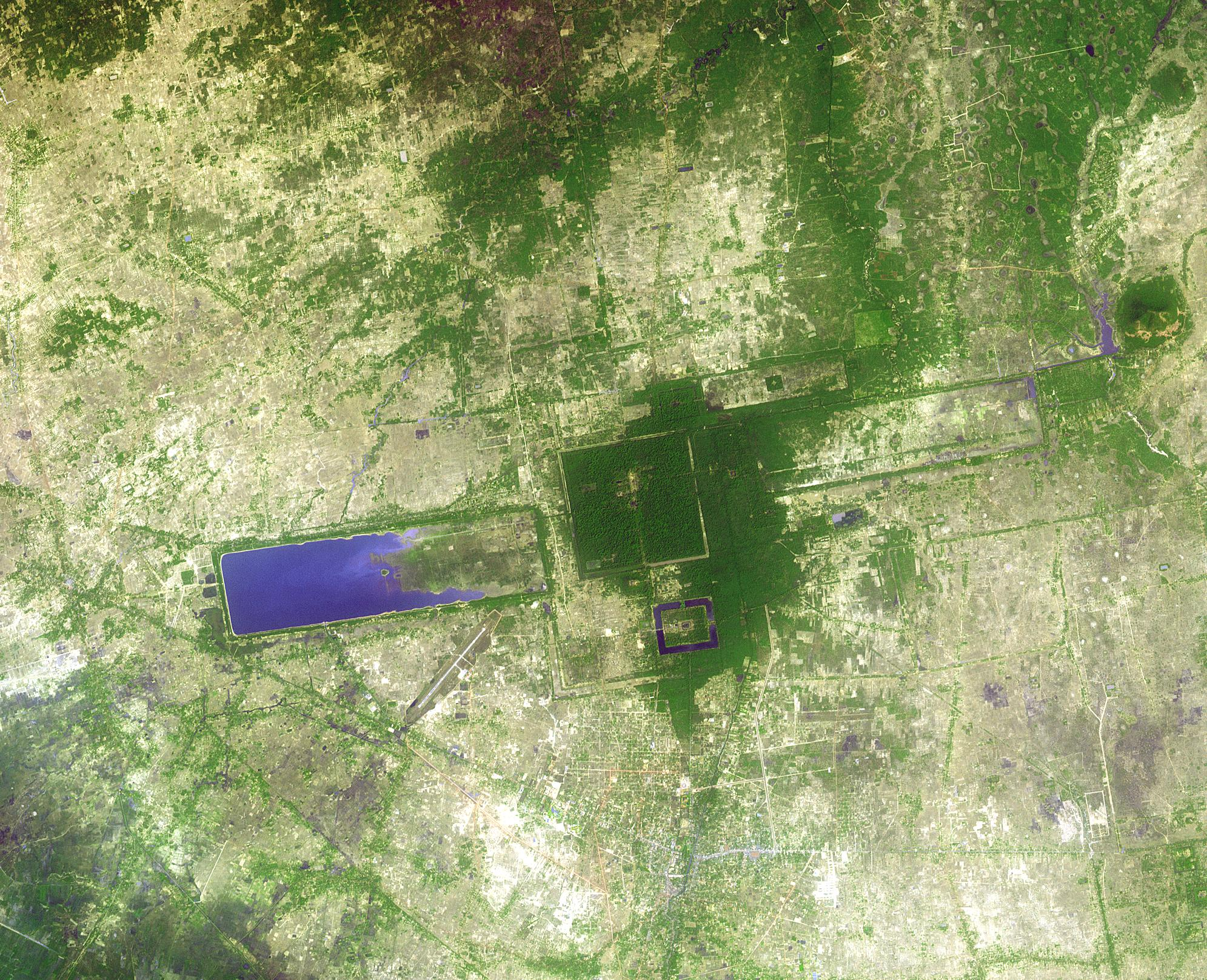
Molyvann took inspiration from ancient Khmer architecture for water management and canals in his projects.

Inspired by the numerous universities in post-independence Indonesia, Sihanouk also ordered Molyvann to create the Royal University of Phnom Penh. Molyvann proceeded to coalesce a council for the new university by meeting students, teachers and scholars around the country. In 1967, Molyvann was also appointed the Minister of Education by Sihanouk.

Molyvann developed a unique style that combined traditional Khmer design with modernism that became known as New Khmer Architecture. He also adapted his designs to Cambodia's climate and weather into his design through adding air holes for ventilation, drainage and irrigation for heavy rain, and natural light. Stilted buildings also created shaded social areas underneath houses. He cited Le Corbusier and UK garden cities as influences.

In 1962, Molyvann designed the 60,000 capacity National Sports Complex. The stadium, built to Olympic standards, was the largest venue in Cambodia, with a moat around it to prevent flooding. Molyvann considered this project his greatest achievement. Built in less than two years with the intent for it to house the 1963 Southeast Asian Peninsular Games that were then awarded to Indonesia, it was only inaugurated in 1964, and became known as the Olympic Stadium. It hosted such important events as the GANEFO games and the President of France, Charles de Gaulle's state visit, in 1966.

Impressed with his work in Phnom Penh, Lee Kuan Yew offered Molyvann the opportunity to help design a new Singapore, which he declined.

== Civil War and Khmer Rouge era ==
In 1970 the Sangkum Reastr Niyum came to a brutal end with the coup d'état led by General Lon Nol. Molyvann had been the Sangkum's longest serving Minister of Education and was a likely target to reprisals from the new regime due to his close relationship with Sihanouk. He and his family relocated to Switzerland with the help of the ambassador to Israel. During the Khmer Rouge era, many of his buildings were abandoned or used as imprisonment or execution sites after Phnom Penh was forcibly evacuated. The Khmer Rouge unsuccessfully attempted to destroy the National Bank in Sihanoukville, and used the Sports Complex for mass rallies. Molyvann's father and several of his family members perished in the Cambodian genocide. After the Khmer Rouge fell in 1979, many of his buildings were used by the returning population but fell into disrepair and neglect. He chose not to return then as the subsequent rulers were "still communists".

While in Switzerland, he continued to work as an architect, as well as working on urban development for the World Bank. He also spent 10 years working for the United Nations Human Settlements Programme.

== Return to Cambodia ==
Molyvann returned to Cambodia in 1991 where he served as President of the Council of Ministers, Minister of Culture, Fine Arts, Town and Country Planning. He successfully applied to have his house returned to him. He was also appointed head of Authority for the Protection of the Site and Management of the Region of Angkor (APSARA), where Molyvann was instrumental in preserving the temples of Angkor by ensuring large hotels were built outside the borders of the temple complex. He also successfully advocated for the temples to be granted World Heritage Site status by UNESCO. In 2001, he was removed from his post in APSARA over disputes with the government over who should benefit from admissions to the temples, and how the area should be developed. Molyvann had wanted a separate "tourist village" to be built separate from both the temples and Siem Reap's old town, with water conservation as a key goal.

By the early 21st century, Molyvann's urban planning and many of his buildings were under threat due to redevelopment, urban sprawl, corruption and speculative land deals. His landmark National Theatre was destroyed in a fire in 1994, and the Council of Ministers building was demolished in 2008. Tycoon Kith Meng agreed to rebuild the theatre in 2005 in exchange for the rights to the surrounding land. One of Molyvann's housing developments, by then known as the White Building, had become a slum, and was declared hazardous by authorities and torn down in 2017. In 2008, Molyvann completed his doctoral thesis on the development and planning of Asian cities entitled Modern Khmer Cities.

Later in life, Molyvann expressed resentment that modern urban development in Phnom Penh was failing to consider its environment and water management, creating greater risk of flooding. For this he was critical of Hun Sen and the ruling Cambodian People's Party, and expressed support for the Cambodia National Rescue Party in 2014. The National Sports Complex was sold to a private developer in 2001 which filled up its vital hydraulic system, consisting of moats and water treatment stations, with shoddy constructions, hence compromising its survival and increasing flood risk. Molyvann expressed his anger at these changes, arguing "The Taiwanese company see it as a profit-making building; they have no concept of art. We created that building out of the traditions of Angkorian architecture. But the government doesn't care about all that tradition."

== Death ==
Vann Molyvann died on 28 September 2017, at his home in Siem Reap city, aged 90. His assistant said he had died of old age and was not sick. He was survived by his wife, three daughters and two sons. Prime minister Hun Sen and Thai Naraksathya, secretary of state at the Ministry of Culture and Fine Arts, all offered condolences to Molyvann's family and acknowledged Molyvann's impact and legacy. His funeral was held on 1 October 2017 in Siem Reap, with some of his ashes released into the water to the east of Angkor Wat before dawn, and others beside a stupa that Molyvann had designed.

== Legacy ==
His work in modernising Phnom Penh whilst incorporating traditional designs and the local environmental conditions led to him being nicknamed "the man who built Cambodia". The Vann Molyvann Project was established in 2009 to raise awareness of New Khmer Architecture among local architects. In 2013, Vann Molyvann won the Nikkei Asia Prize in the culture category. His works on famous landmarks such as the Olympic Stadium and the Independence Monument were highly recognized. Nikkei Asia Prizes was launched by Nikkei Inc. in 1996, the awards program honours people in Asia who have made significant contributions in three areas: regional growth, science, technology and innovation, and culture. In 2016, he was the subject of a documentary titled The Man Who Built Cambodia, narrated by Matt Dillon.

Molyvann's 100 Houses remained a residential area at the time of his death, despite limited conservation work taking place on the buildings. The Olympic Stadium also remains a popular public space for Phnom Penh residents.

As a result of the war, Molyvann remained obscure in Cambodia and internationally until near the end of his life. He remains an influential figure for local architects. In his obituary The New York Times commented that by the time of his death, Molyvann was widely respected by many Cambodians for his vision and integrity.

== Notable works ==
=== Phnom Penh ===
- National Sports Complex
- Council of Ministers
- State Palace
- Royal University of Phnom Penh
- Institute of Foreign Languages
- Chaktomuk Conference Hall
- Teacher Training College
- White Building
- Independence Monument
- National Theatre
- Front du Bassac housing development
- Vann Molyvann House
- 100 Houses

=== Sihanoukville ===
- National Bank of Cambodia
- SKD Brewery and staff housing
