= White Building (film) =

2021 film

- Directed by: Kavich Neang
- Starring: Piseth Chhun
- Release date: 7 September 2021 (Venice)
- Running time: 90 minutes
- Country: Cambodia
- Language: Khmer

White Building is a 2021 Cambodian drama film directed by Kavich Neang. It was selected as the Cambodian entry for the Best International Feature Film at the 94th Academy Awards. The film was also nominated for the New Talent Award at the Hong Kong Asian Film Festival 2021.

== Plot ==
The lives of three friends are upended when the artist enclave where they reside, the White Building, is scheduled to be demolished.

== Cast ==
- Piseth Chhun
- Chinnaro Soem

== See also ==
- List of submissions to the 94th Academy Awards for Best International Feature Film
- List of Cambodian submissions for the Academy Award for Best International Feature Film
