= Hotel Cambodiana =

Hotel in Phnom Penh, Cambodia

Coordinates: 11.5598687°N 104.9366033°E

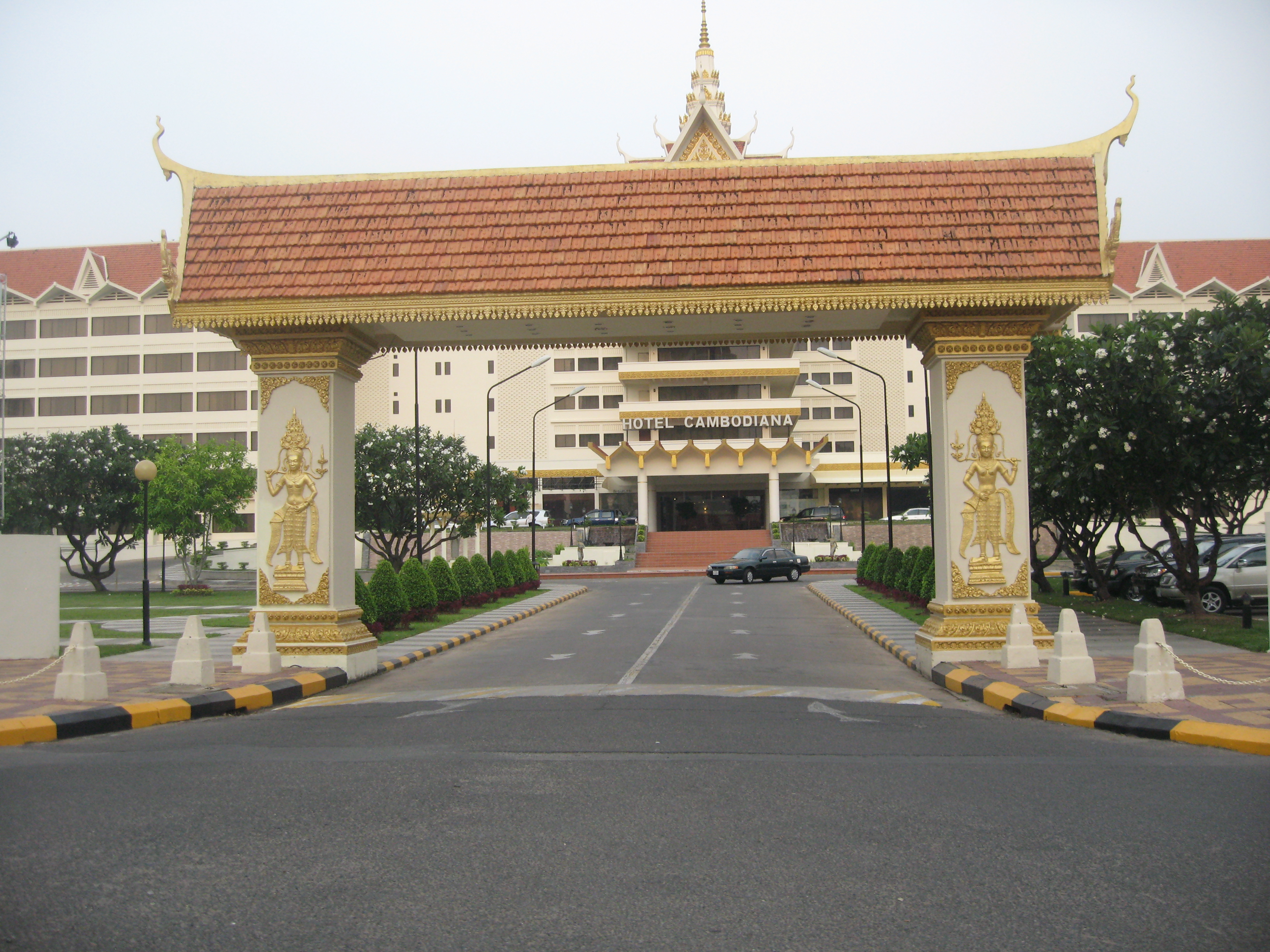
The entrance of Hotel Cambodiana

The Hotel Cambodiana (Khmer: សណ្ឋាគារខេមបូឌីយ៉ាណា, Sânthakéar Khémbodiyana) is a 239-room hotel on the banks of the Tonlé Sap River in the heart of Phnom Penh, Cambodia, approximately 10 km from Phnom Penh International Airport.

Construction of the Cambodiana was initiated by Prince Norodom Sihanouk in the early 1960s. He originally requested a 10-bungalow luxury resort/government guesthouse, but noted Cambodian architect Lu Ban Hap suggested a larger international luxury hotel would be more profitable. Lu designed the structure in the then-popular New Khmer style. Construction of the Cambodiana began in 1963, on stilts on reclaimed land. The hotel opened in 1969, with 100 rooms, but only operated for a year. In 1970, Lon Nol's troops overthrew Prince Sianhouk and converted the hotel to military barracks. The hotel was abandoned during the Khmer Rouge period, later serving as refugee housing.

In the late 1980s, a Singapore-based company purchased a 70-year lease from the Cambodian government. They restored and expanded the Cambodiana to 239 rooms, and reopened it in July 1990. The hotel was operated by the French Sofitel chain from 1992 to April 1, 2001 as the Sofitel Cambodiana. It was purchased by The Royal Group in 2005. In 2016, plans were announced to demolish the building and construct a 20-story replacement. In 2019 new plans were announced to replace the hotel with a 600-meter skyscraper.
