= Doch Chkae =

Cambodian metal band

- Origin: Phnom Penh, Cambodia
- Genres: Death metal, metalcore
- Years active: 2015–present
- Labels: Seila Records
- Members: Sochetra Pic; Ouch Hing; Sok Vichey; Ouch Theara

Doch Chkae (Khmer: ដូចឆ្កែ – "like a dog") are a Cambodian metal band from Phnom Penh, formed in 2015.

== History ==
Sochetra Pic, Sok Vichey, Ouch Theara and Ouch Hing were all born in a landfill in Khan Mean Chey, Phnom Penh, where they collected refuse to make a living. When the boys reached their adolescence, their families could no longer provide for them, so Pic, Vichey, Theara and Hing were placed in the care of a local NGO, Moms Against Poverty. The director of the NGO, Timon Seibel introduced them to bands such as Slipknot and Rage Against the Machine and took them to a local concert of the Cambodian deathcore band Sliten6ix, which inspired the boys to start playing music; they formed a band a year later.

In 2018, Doch Chkae were invited to perform at Wacken Open Air festival in Germany, but their visa application was rejected. A petition calling the authorities to grant the band the visa was launched and signed by more than 10,000 people. Doch Chkae played at Wacken Open Air the following year.

On 9 January 2020, the band performed at the "Year End Party: Dear Agony" in Lela Saigon Bar, Ho Chi Minh City, Vietnam. On 13 March, Doch Chkae released a 3-song EP "Worse than Dogs". In 2021, the band released the song "Tortured" (ទារុណកម្).

They were nominated 'Breakthrough Asian Band' at the 2021 Global Metal Apocalypse awards, and finished 10th.

== Discography ==
- Dream in Hell (2016, single)
- ខាំគ្នាដូចឆ្ (2016, single)
- Worse than Dogs (2020, EP)
- Tortured (ទារុណកម្) (2021, single)
