= Chaktomuk Conference Hall =

Theatre in Phnom Penh, Cambodia

Coordinates: 11.5442°N 104.9135°E

- សាលសន្និសីទចតុមុខ
- Chaktomuk Conference Hall, East Side

General information
- Architectural style: Khmer
- Location: Sisowath Quay, Phnom Penh
- Completed: 1961

Design and construction
- Architect: Vann Molyvann

The Chaktomuk Conference Hall (Khmer: សាលសន្និសីទចតុមុខ, romanized: Salsǎnnĭsĕt Chătŏmŭk) is a theatre located in the city of Phnom Penh, Cambodia. The fan-shaped hall is one of the most iconic works of famous Cambodian architect Vann Molyvann and was since its construction in 1961 one of the "landmarks and infrastructures of the newly independent nation".

Mainly used for the purpose of conducting ceremonies for foreign governors, the hall is a designed concrete structure which radiates in a fan shape referencing a palm leaf. The design combines traditional building elements (Khmer architecture) with a modern structure.

== Etymology ==
Chaktomuk Hall takes it name "from the original site of Phnom Penh at the junction of four rivers", the Upper and the Lower Mekong, the Tonle Sap, and the Bassac. Chaktomuk has given its name to the current era of Cambodian history, after the Angkor, Longvek and Oudong eras.

== History ==
=== The Salle de Conférence since 1961 ===
In 1961, Chaktomuk Conference Hall was originally opened as La salle de conférence Chaktomuk. Many important government meetings would, at a majority take place in this very hall for conference purposes.

Chaktomuk was the place of major religious conventions before 1975. In 1961 the World Fellowship of Buddhists with delegates from twenty-eight countries was the first major international event held in the hall.

During the Civil War in 1972, the Chaktomuk Conference Hall welcomed two major Christian gatherings known as "evangelistic crusades", attended by Taing Chhirc and Barnabas Mam, among others future leaders of the Christian churches in Cambodia.

=== The first Khmer Rouge Tribunal after 1979 ===
After the Vietnamese invasion of Cambodia which sent the Khmers Rouges into hiding, Pol Pot was tried in absentia in an ad hoc tribunal occasionally set up at the Chaktomuk Hall. This "theatrical setting" would later be replaced by the Extraordinary Chambers of the Supreme Court of Cambodia which would judge the others Khmers Rouges leaders, such as Ieng Sary.

=== From Khmer cultural renewal to a devastating fire in 1991 ===
Along with the Suramarit Theater, in the 1980s, Chaktomuk Hall became one of the centers of cultural renewal after the devastation of Cambodian culture inflicted by almost four years of Khmer Rouge terror. A twice yearly festival was organized by the National Dance Company.

Later on, 1991 this hall designated for redevelopment as a restaurant. With a great view of the Tonlé Sap River, the customers had a great review. After a harmful yet devastating fire took place at the hall, it partly destroyed the hall that ruined the structure.

=== Becoming a national and international venue in Phnom Penh ===
Chaktomuk Conference hall used to be a restaurant then theatre but this hall nowadays is mainly used for the conference, lectures and occasional performing art activities. The Chaktomuk Conference Hall in Phnom Penh has undergone several changes and was completely remodeled in the year 2000 mainly to provide international standard facilities for conferences, seminars and lectures. The flexible design allows it to be used more rarely as a theater hall for special programs and concerts in Cambodia, but there is no longer a residential performing arts troupe.

In 2009, King Norodom Sihamoni congratulated disabled Chinese artists at Chaktomuk Conference Hall.

In December 2013, around two hundred monks led a protest in front of Chaktomuk Hall during a conference of the Buddhist leadership in Cambodia. Their complaint concerned the theft of Buddha's relics on Oudong mountain on 10 December 2013.

In 2014, Royal Palace Minister Kong Sam Ol led a requiem memorial event in Chaktomuk Hall about the Phnom Penh stampede that happened in 2010 which had killed 353 people on the bridge to Koh Pich island in the hall.

Since 2019, Chaktomuk has been the venue chosen by the Phnom Penh Symphonic Orchestra for its performances with the "acoustics of the cozy theatre" helping to make the Conference Hall a comfortable musical venue as well.

== Design ==
=== Context: a masterpiece of New Khmer Architecture ===
The hall combines traditional Khmer elements with modern structural design. The design behind this structure was created by Vann Molyvann, one of the major practitioners of New Khmer Architecture.

To bring out the culture he was raised in, the building was designed as a concrete structure radiating in a fan, made to represent a palm leaf. The location was also a set back to the hall with a 270-degree view that can see the full views of the 4 rivers cross together. It also included novel bio-climate features and was intended by architect Vann Molyvann to create a harmony with other surrounding buildings as well as the general landscape, at the point were the Mekong meets the Tonle Sap.

=== Architecture: between Khmer art and functional design ===
The hall was made to accommodate 850 people. It was designed to have an open-space area that functioned as a multi-purpose room. Ventilation in tropical buildings is one of the most important features, which is provided here from the ground floor flowing up toward the backstage to flow in both directions.

Vann Molyvann considers the design of Chaktomuk Conference Hall a reinterpretation of the roofs of the nearby Royal Palace. The eight gabled roofs, fanned out across Chaktomuk’s quarter-circle plan, borrow the traditional gables seen in its architecture.

— Vann Molyvann Project

The seating areas were made from the ground floor from the back of the building flowing underneath of the stage, an unusual design that made one of Cambodia's major attractions. To avoid the heat that was transmitted from the sunlight in the hall, a double roof was installed. 4 main entry doors were planned, with exits on the sides of the room to make it easy for the audience to enter and leave without disturbing the performers. The building's peculiar fan-shape enables the audience to have the full view of the stage without the need for standing up.

== Links ==
- Description of the Chaktomuk Conference Hall, Vann Molyvann Project (Official website)
