= White Building (Phnom Penh) =

Apartment building in Cambodia

Coordinates: 11°33′09.25″N 104°55′58.19″E

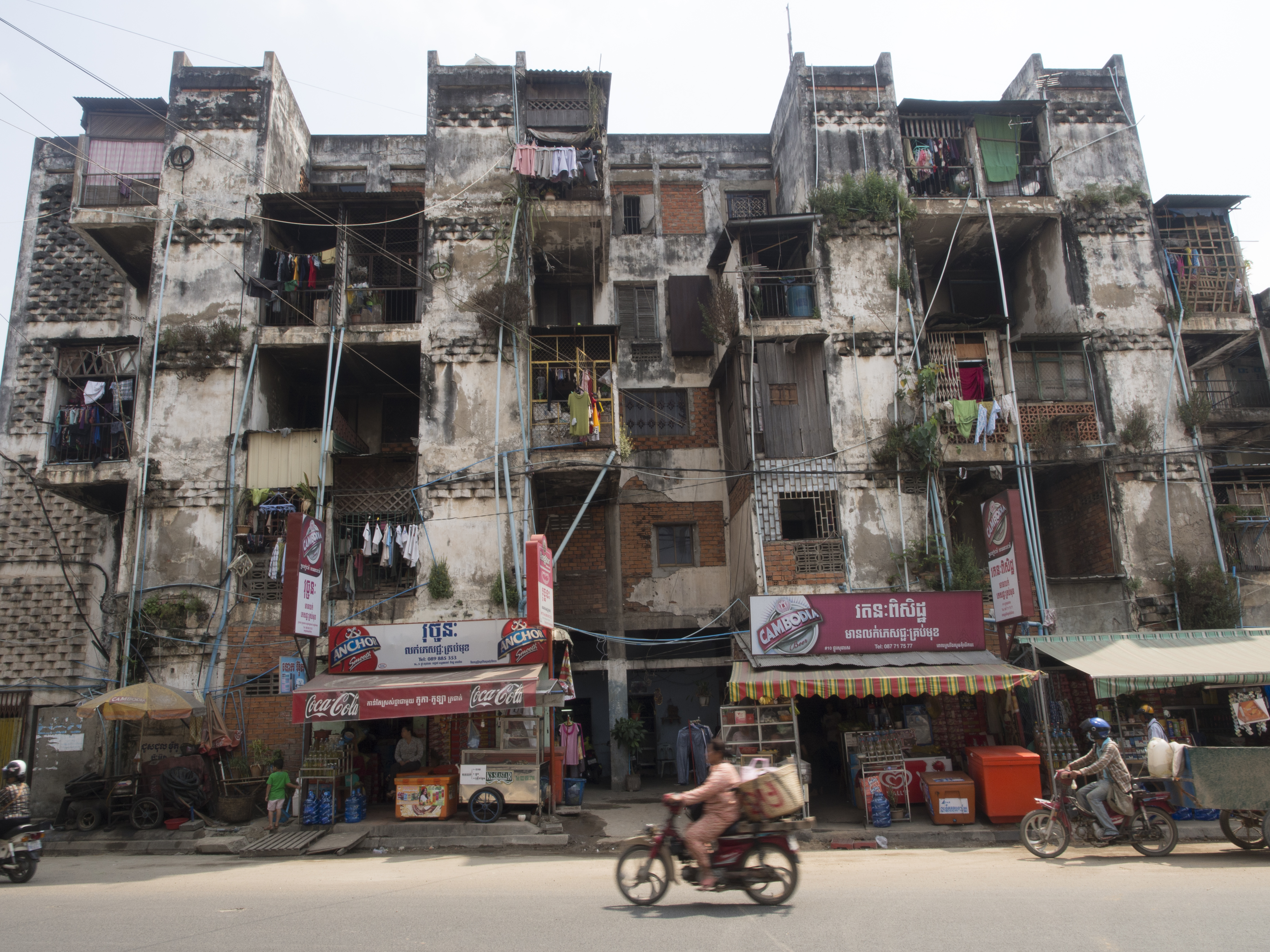
The White Building in 2014

The White Building, originally known as the Municipal Apartments, was a large and prominent apartment building in Phnom Penh, Cambodia, one of the buildings in the Bassac development. The White Building was on Samdach Sothearos Boulevard near the Bassac River, a large urban extension project built on reclaimed land in the early 1960s. After being abandoned during the Khmer Rouge era, it became a squat. After many years of neglect, it was declared unsafe by authorities, its residents evicted and it was demolished in 2017.

== History ==
The UN consultants Gérald Hanning and Vladimir Bodiansky introduced the concept of the building, a 450-metre (1,480 ft) architectural composition, directly inspired by previous AT.BAT designs built in Morocco. Lu Ban Hap, then Chief Architect of the Municipality of Phnom Penh, was responsible for the site supervision. The White Building was designed to house moderate-income tenants, and was adopted by many artists who found the innovative design appealing. With the nearby Grey Building, designed by Vann Molyvann, it was initially built for athletes in the 1964 GANEFO (Games of the non-aligned forces) international sports event. After years of neglect and deterioration since the fall of the Khmer Rouge, the White Building was demolished in 2017.

The building was composed of six blocks of concrete construction, three or four stories tall, connected by open bridge structures, along a double-loaded spine. It included stores and doctors' offices as well as 468 apartments.

Tenants fled during the Cambodian genocide in the 1970s. After the defeat of the Khmer Rouge in 1979 the White Building was reoccupied by former tenants and squatters. It gradually declined and became known for poverty, drug use and prostitution. Its population in 2015 was about 2500.

According to municipal authorities, the building was structurally deteriorating and unsafe. Tenants used the high-ceilinged rooms to add lofts, and balconies were enclosed, obscuring the once-white building's design and also adding weight to the structure. Cracking appeared in 2015 after construction on an adjoining lot. Several proposals have been made to tear it down for redevelopment. Eviction orders were issued in July 2015. However, the building's status as an iconic New Khmer building stimulated preservation efforts.

== Demolition ==
In July 2017, the almost 500 families still living in the White Building were moving out; the building was to be replaced by a 21-storey mixed-use development. In 2018 it was revealed that the site was not to be a Japanese-backed mixed-use residential and retail tower as cited prior to the demolition of the building, but instead a $3.5bn casino was intended for the site by owners NagaCorp, their third casino in Phnom Penh.

== See also ==
- Squatting in Cambodia
- White Building (film), a 2021 film
