= Royal University of Phnom Penh =

National research university in Phnom Penh, Cambodia

- សាកលវិទ្យាល័យភូមិន្ទភ្នំពេញ (Khmer); Université royale de Phnom Penh (French)
- Former names: Royal Khmer University (1960-1970); Phnom Penh University (1970-1996)
- Motto: ការអប់រំ ស្រាវជ្រាវ និងបម្រើដល់សង្គម (Khmer)
- Motto in English: Education, Research and Service to Society
- Type: National research
- Established: 13 January 1960; 66 years ago
- Academic affiliations: ASEAN University Network; Agence universitaire de la Francophonie; Greater Mekong Sub-region Academic and Research Network; University Mobility in Asia and the Pacific
- Rector: Prof. Dr. Chet Chealy
- Faculty: 294
- Administrative staff: 140
- Undergraduates: 20,634
- Postgraduates: 987
- Location: Russian Federation Blvd, Phnom Penh, Cambodia; 11.569°N 104.8914°E
- Nickname: RUPP
- Website: www.rupp.edu.kh

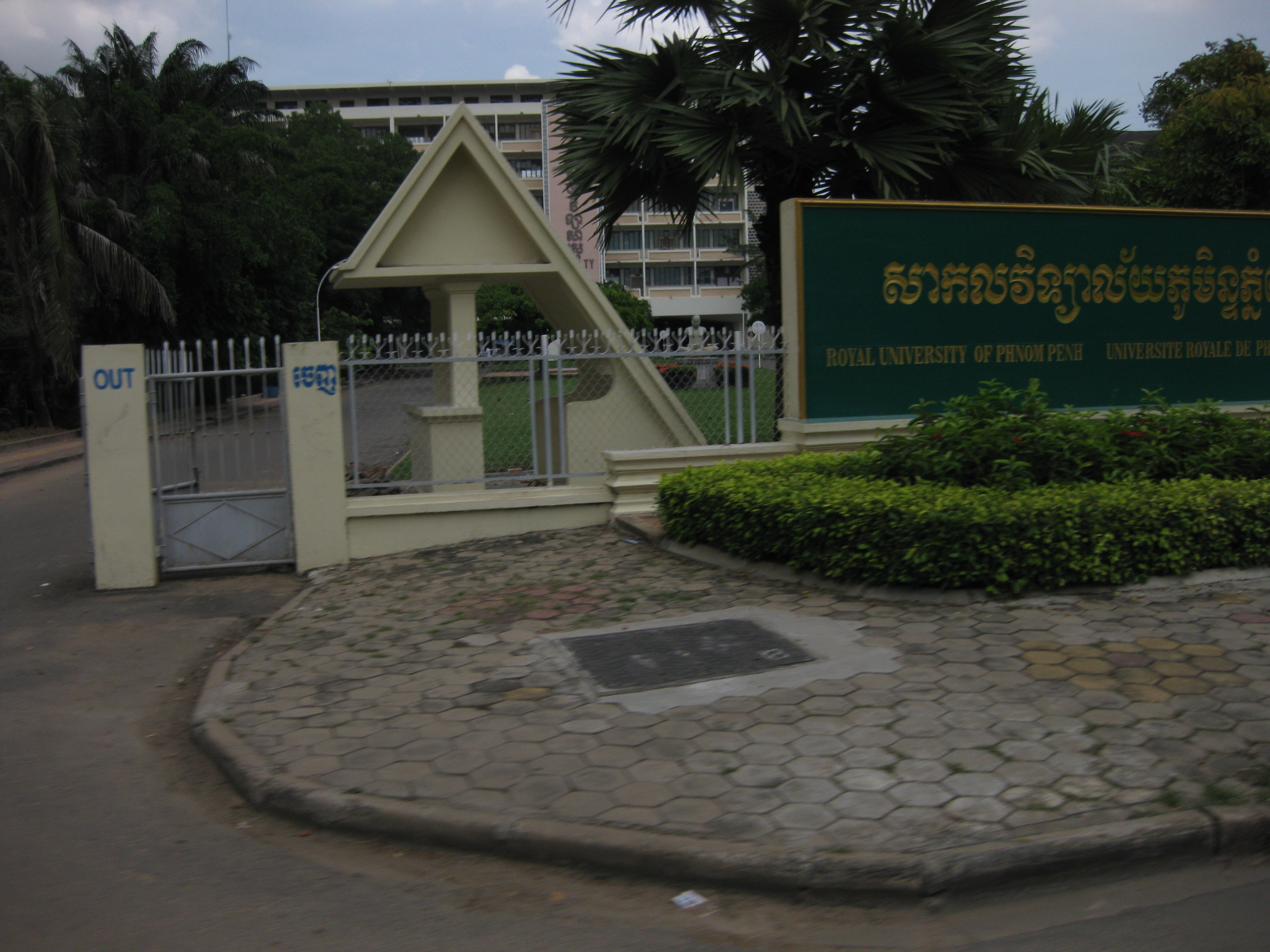
Royal University of Phnom Penh entry

The Royal University of Phnom Penh (RUPP; Khmer: សាកលវិទ្យាល័យភូមិន្ទភ្នំពេញ, Sakǎlvĭtyialai Phumĭn Phnǒm Penh [saːkɑlʋɨtjiəlaj pʰuːmɨn pʰnom pəɲ]; French: Université royale de Phnom Penh) is a national research university of Cambodia, located in the Phnom Penh capital. Established in 1960, it is the country's largest university. It hosts around 30,000 students in undergraduate and postgraduate programmes. It offers degrees in fields such as sciences, humanities and social sciences, environment, engineering as well as vocational courses in fields such as information technology, electronics, psychology and tourism. RUPP provides Cambodia's foremost degree-level language programmes through the Institute of Foreign Languages. RUPP has full membership in the ASEAN University Network (AUN).

RUPP has over 420 full-time staff. All of its 294 academic staff hold tertiary qualifications, including 24 PhDs and 132 Master's degrees. They are supported by 140 administrative and maintenance staff. The university maintains linkage networks with Cambodian and international NGOs, universities and government ministries. As a result, international and non-government organizations and government offices regularly contribute adjunct faculty members to help expand RUPP's capacity.

== History ==
The Royal University of Phnom Penh began as the Royal Khmer University (Khmer: សាកលវិទ្យាល័យខេមរភូមិន្ទ, Sākalvidyālăy Khemarabhūmind; French: Université royale khmère) in 1960. It opened during a period of intense growth in Cambodia and expanded to include a National Institute of Judicial and Economic Studies, a Royal School of Medicine, a National School of Commerce, a National Pedagogical Institute, a Faculty of Letters and Human Sciences, and a Faculty of Science and Technology. The language of instruction during this period was French.

With the growth of Cambodia's economy and an assertion of its historical role, modern buildings for that time were constructed in the style of the New Khmer Architecture, which has influences of Bauhaus, European post-modern architecture, and traditions from Angkor.

With the establishment of the Khmer Republic in 1970, the university became the Phnom Penh University (Khmer: សាកលវិទ្យាល័យភ្នំពេញ; French: Université de Phnom Penh). Between 1965 and 1975 there were nine faculties: the Ecole Normale Supérieure (Higher Normal College), Letters and Humanities, Science, Pharmacy, Law and Economics, Medicine and Dentistry, Commerce, Pedagogy, and the Languages Institute.

The Democratic Kampuchea period of 1975–1979 saw the closure and destruction of schools, the decimation of the teaching service and the cessation of formal education at the hands of the Khmer Rouge. Phung Ton, the rector of Phnom Penh University, was arrested, tortured and murdered at Tuol Sleng (S-21). During this period, Phnom Penh University and all other educational institutions in Cambodia were closed down. Under this regime an education was perceived as a dangerous asset. Hence, the educated were targeted, and most of the university's teachers and students were killed. The campus was abandoned and remained deserted for almost five years. Of the educated people who survived, few remained in Cambodia once the borders reopened following the Vietnamese invasion that toppled Khmer Rouge rule.

In 1980, under the People's Republic of Kampuchea, the Ecole Normale Supérieure (Higher Normal College) reopened, again teaching predominantly in French. In 1981, the Institute of Foreign Languages (IFL) began, initially training students to become Vietnamese and Russian teachers. The purpose of both colleges was to provide surviving graduates of primary school or above with crash courses in teaching.

In 1988, the college and the IFL merged to create Phnom Penh University, and in 1996 the name was changed to the Royal University of Phnom Penh.

During the past decade, the university has grown and now includes the Faculty of Science, Faculty of Social Sciences and Humanities, and the Institute of Foreign Languages. In 2001, RUPP began its first postgraduate degrees with the graduate diploma and Master's courses in Tourism Development. A Master's degree in Biodiversity Conservation began in 2005 in partnership with conservation NGO Fauna and Flora International.

== Organisation ==
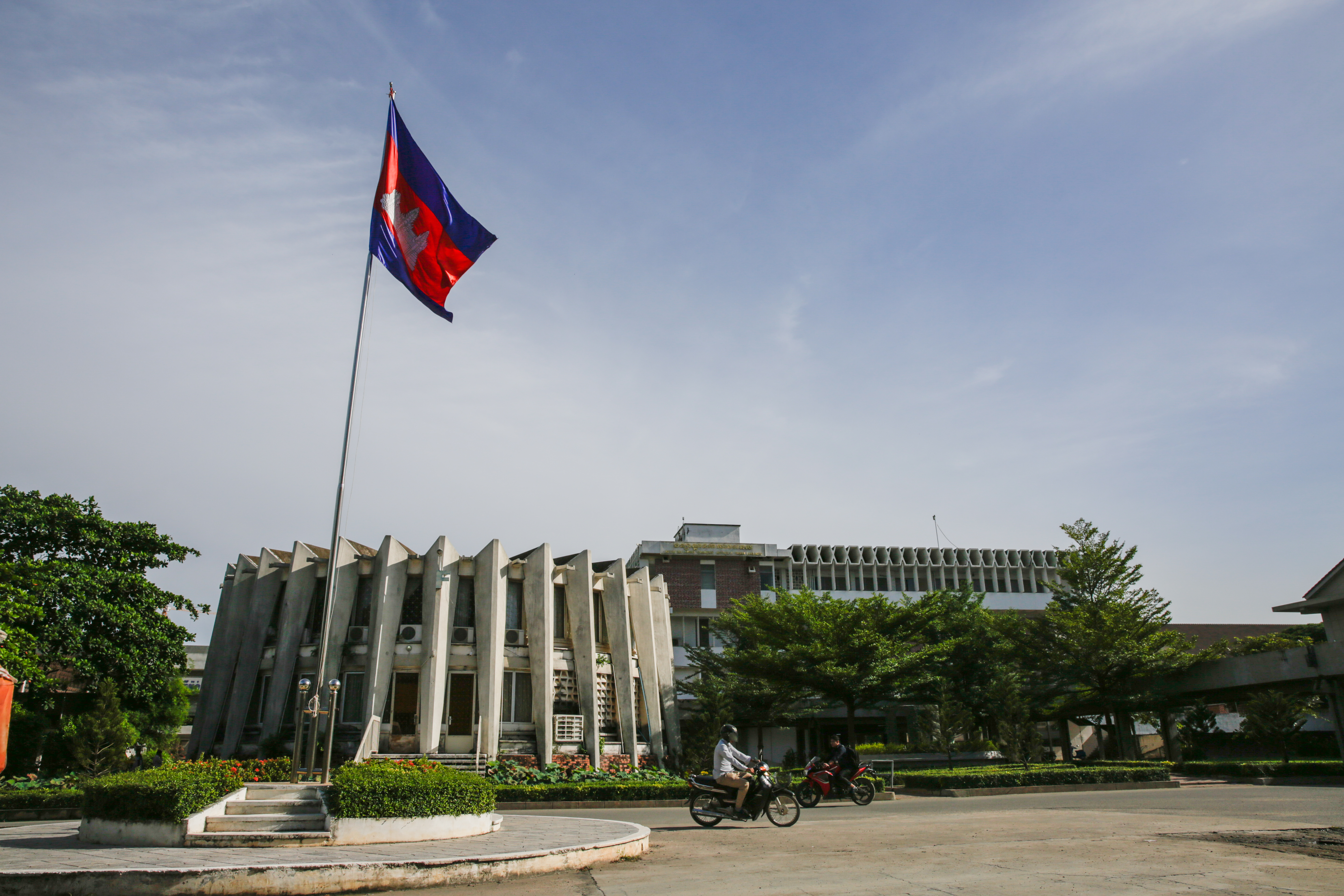
The Institute of Foreign Languages (IFL) is the largest institution of the Royal University of Phnom Penh.

- Faculty of Science
  - Department of Biology
  - Department of Chemistry
  - Department of Computer Science
  - Department of Environmental Science
  - Department of Mathematics
  - Department of Physics
- Faculty of Social Sciences and Humanities
  - Department of Geography
  - Department of History
  - Department of International Business Management
  - Department of Khmer Literature
  - Department of Linguistics
  - Department of Media and Communication
  - Department of Philosophy
  - Department of Psychology
  - Department of Sociology
  - Department of Social Work
  - Department of Tourism
- Faculty of Engineering
  - Department of Automation and Supply Chain Systems Engineering
  - Department of Bioengineering
  - Department of Data Science Engineering
  - Department of Environmental Engineering
  - Department of Information Technology Engineering
  - Department of Telecommunication and Electronic Engineering
- Faculty of Development Studies
  - Department of Community Development
  - Department of Economic Development
  - Department of Natural Resources Management and Development
- Faculty of Education
  - Department of Educational Studies
  - Department of Higher Education Development and Management
  - Department of Lifelong Learning
- Institute of Foreign Languages
  - Department of Chinese
  - Department of English
  - Department of French
  - Department of Japanese
  - Department of Korean
  - Department of Thai
- Institute of International Studies and Public Policy
  - Department of International Relations
  - Department of International Economics
  - Department of Political Science and Public Policy
  - Department of Vietnamese Studies
  - Centre for South East Asian Studies
  - Centre for Cambodian Studies
  - Cambodia 21st Century Maritime Silk Road Research Centre
- Silk Research Centre

== Royal University of Phnom Penh Campus 2 ==
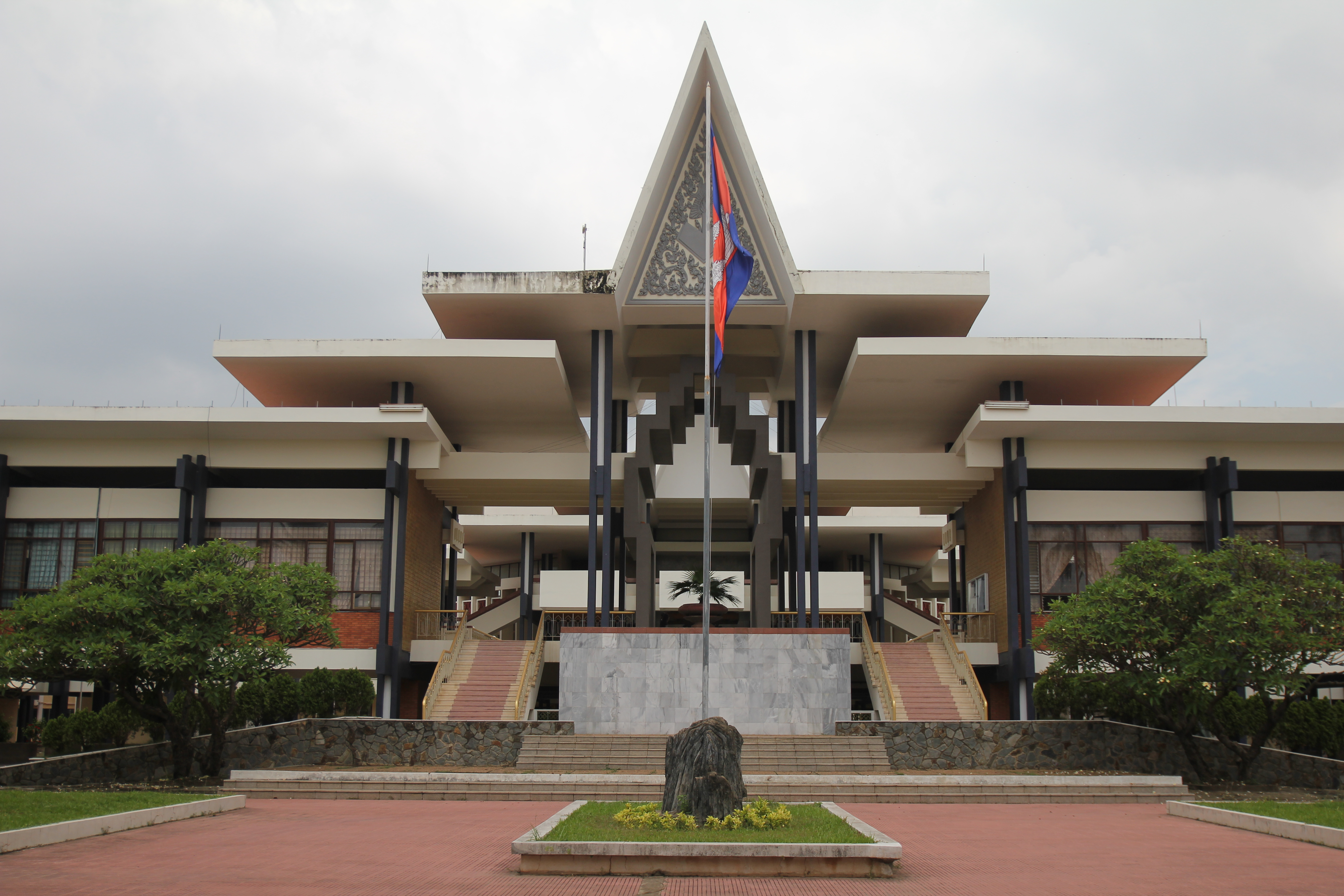
RUPP Campus 2

The Campus 2 of the Royal University of Phnom Penh was built between 1989 and 1991 with the support of the Vietnamese Communist government. It is located on five hectares of land on Russian Federation Boulevard. Apart from the classrooms of the Departments of Geography, History and Sociology, there is also the Royal Academy of Cambodia on the compound that uses the former canteen as office space. The former university dormitories house the research center of the Royal Academy of Cambodia.

Oum Pom, the Secretary General of the Royal Academy of Cambodia, remembers: "In today’s Institute of Foreign Languages (IFL) was a political training centre after the Vietnamese took control of Cambodia. However, since the building was small, we decided to build a new and more comfortable one." Oum Pom, who was the vice president of this school, adds that the professors and teachers, who were high-ranking officials of the Cambodian Communist government, gathered to choose the location and the building style. Formerly, the Parachute Unit of the Cambodian Army was located on the lot. Acting on the request of the People's Revolutionary Party of Kampuchea, the Vietnamese government decided to send architects and workers to construct the campus. The names of the Vietnamese architects have not been recorded.

Pom adds that the architecture of the new campus was influenced both by the ancient style of Khmer temples from the Angkor period and by a visit to some modern buildings such as the Hotel Cambodiana and the original university campus, where the political training centre was located at that time. Pom says: "We believe that the two ponds and its bridges were inspired by the ponds of the previous school (today’s IFL) and Angkor Wat. It makes the students feel calm and cool during the classes and helps them to relax." In ancient temple architecture, the Cambodian ancestors usually adorned the buildings by surrounding them with ponds and added bridges decorated with dragon heads, he adds.

The school was supposed to teach the students Marxist–Leninist theories and how mankind would evolve toward socialism. When the Vietnamese left Cambodia in 1992, the school was never opened; the Cambodian Communist government decided to hand the building over to the Ministry of Education.

== Co-operation with the Royal Government of Cambodia ==
The support of the Royal Government of Cambodia, particularly the Ministry of Education, Youth and Sport (MOEYS), is critical to the life of RUPP. All degrees and course programs at RUPP have been recommended and supported by the government, which covers electricity and utility costs, provides staff salaries (approximately US$500/month), and provides important resources such as computers, infrastructure and furniture. The prime minister and other government representatives have participated in the university's graduation, cultural and opening ceremonies.
