= Squatting in Cambodia =

Property squatting in the country of Cambodia

Cambodia on the globe

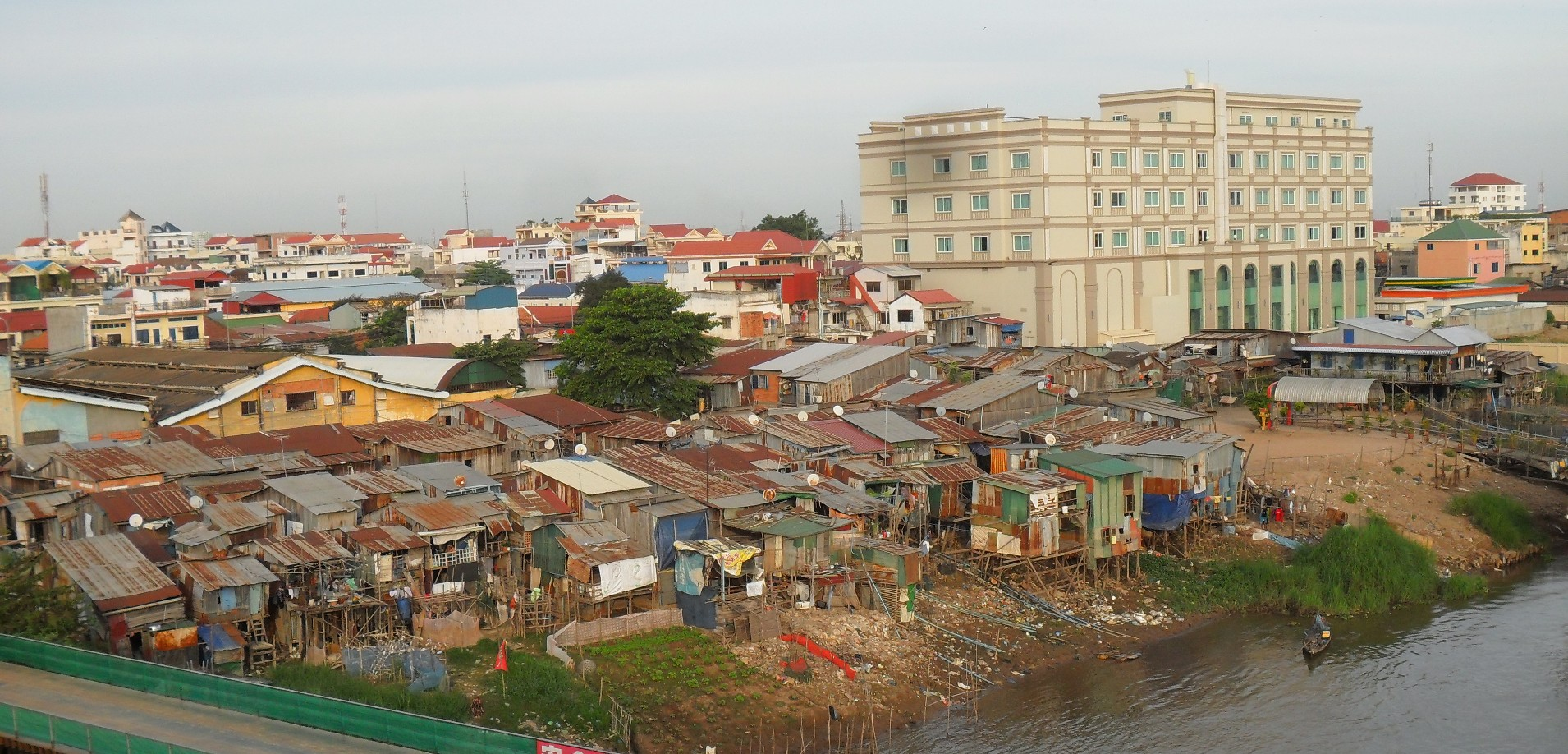
An informal settlement in Phnom Penh

Squatting is common in the country of Cambodia. Following the Khmer Rouge and the Pol Pot regime, the new democratic government introduced land reform. In the capital Phnom Penh, where in 2003 an estimated 25 per cent of the population was squatting, there are informal settlements and occupied buildings.

Land disputes and evictions are common across Cambodia. Squatters are known officially as the "urban poor" or "temporary residents".

== Legality ==
Squatting is not an activity defined in Cambodian law. In the Khmer language, "squatter" means an anarchist and "squatters settlements" literally translate as "places where anarchy and confusion reign" therefore officially squatters are referred to by different names, such as the "urban poor" or "temporary residents".

== History ==
=== 20th century ===
After the Khmer Rouge was ousted in 1979, many people returned to Phnom Penh and began living in their old houses or squatted informal settlements if their homes were already occupied. One example of a squatted building was the White Building. Under the Pol Pot regime (1975–1979) almost all the country's cadastral officials had been murdered.

In 1989, the new State of Cambodia launched a sweeping land reform program, recognising 4.9 million claims for title between 1989 and 1993. The United Nations Transitional Authority in Cambodia (UNTAC) oversaw reforms and also caused land prices to soar by inserting $2.8 billion into the local economy.

=== 21st century ===
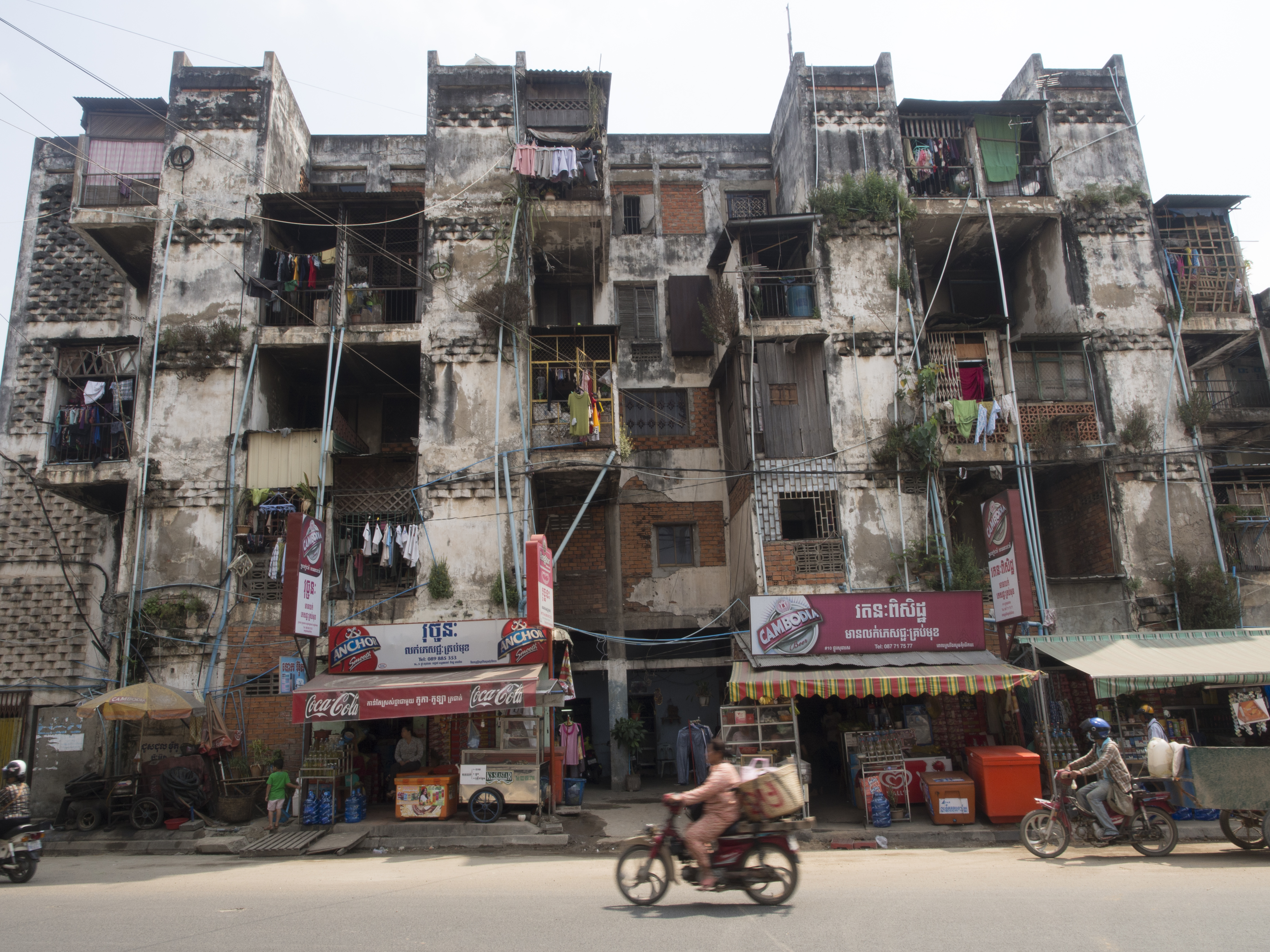
The White Building in 2014.

Until the end of the 1990s, the Phnom Penh authorities did not recognise squatters and tended to evict squats. As of 2003, an estimated 25 per cent of the city's population were squatters. Land disputes and evictions are still common. The World Bank estimated that in Phnom Penh alone, 11,000 households had been evicted between 1998 and 2003.

In 2005, soldiers shot dead six squatters in an eviction and the following year, soldiers and riot police were used to evict a thousand slum-dwellers in Phnom Penh. Amnesty International stated in 2008 that 150,000 people were at risk of being forcibly displaced.

As of 2014, there were estimated to be 300 slums in Phnom Penh, including the Hemakcheat, a former cinema. There are many land disputes and the government has created the Cadastral Commission and the National Authority for Land Dispute Resolutions.

In 2023, the Cambodian government evicted about 10,000 families who had been living near the Angkor Wat temple. As a result, Amnesty International criticized UNESCO for failing to challenge the evictions, which according to Amnesty International violated both Cambodian law and international law. In March 2024, Cambodia responded by denying the allegations, claiming that it had only been moving out squatters and not longtime village residents.
