= Preah Suramarit National Theatre =

Former national theatre of Cambodia

Preah Suramarit National Theatre

The Preah Suramarit National Theatre or the Bassac Theatre was the national theatre of Cambodia in the capital Phnom Penh.

Designed by chief national architect Vann Molyvann in 1966, it opened in 1968 as the Grand Théâtre Preah Bat Norodom Suramarit (aka Mohorsrop Theatre). The theatre building became a landmark structure in modern Phnom Penh. It was demolished in 2008.

== Fire and reconstruction efforts ==
During renovation efforts in February 1994, there was disastrous fire that gutted the entire auditorium and the venue has remained a burned-out shell ever since.

Since the late 1990s, there have been many unsuccessful efforts to seek funds for the restoration of the theatre and to redevelop it as an organisational base and national venue. A $20,000 project by the late Cambodian architect Brum Dar-ravudh had provided the facilities for several rehearsal spaces. Meanwhile, the National Theatre's head, former dancer Mao Keng, had aimed to build a brand-new, state-of-the-art building, which has been rejected by the Cambodian Council of Ministers. A project for a completely new theatre that included dressing rooms, a cafeteria and a swimming pool was proposed in 1999 but never got the green light.

In the ensuing years, neither the Ministry of Culture nor any of the Cambodian cultural or political establishments have been able to raise the finances to restore the theatre and approve any proposals, resulting in a protracted stalemate.

In early 2005, the disposal of the theatre site was given to a local developer and business man Kith Meng, who later executed its complete destruction.

Filmmaker Rithy Panh's 2005 docudrama, The Burnt Theatre, is set in the remains of the theatre, and depicts a theatre troupe struggling to practice their art and keep fine arts alive in Cambodia.
