= Cambodian jungle girl =

Vietnamese woman who emerged in Cambodia

- Born: Rochom P'ngieng; 20th century Indochina
- Known for: feral child

The Cambodian jungle girl is a Vietnamese woman who emerged from the forest in Ratanakiri province, Cambodia on January 13, 2007. A family in a nearby village claimed that the woman was their daughter Rochom P'ngieng (born 1981) who had disappeared 18 or 19 years previously; the story was covered in most media as one of a feral child who lived in the jungle for most of her life. However, some reporters and Non-governmental organizations (NGOs) questioned this explanation and suggested that she instead might be an unrelated woman who had been held in captivity. The woman stayed with the family until 2016, when a Vietnamese man claimed that the woman was his daughter who had disappeared in 2006 at age 23, following a mental breakdown. He was able to provide documentation about the woman's birth and disappearance, and shortly after brought her back to his village in Vietnam. He received the support of her adoptive family as well as the approval of immigration officials.

== Discovery ==
She came to international attention after emerging filthy, naked and scarred from a forest in Ratanakiri province in remote northeastern Cambodia on January 13, 2007. After a villager noticed food missing from a lunch box, he staked out the area, spotted the woman, gathered some friends and caught her. There have also been reports of a naked man who was seen with the woman and ran away when challenged. Some reports have him carrying a sword; some villagers believe he was a forest spirit.

== Theories about identity ==
After hearing about the incident, 45-year-old Sal Lou (or Sar Yo), member of the Pnong ethnic minority and Oyadao village policeman, traveled to the area and claimed that the woman was his long-lost daughter. He last saw his daughter when she was eight years old; in 1988, she was lost in the forest while tending water buffalo near the border with Vietnam. Her six-year-old sister was lost on the same day and has never been found. He identified the girl based on a scar on her arm, supposedly from a knife accident that occurred prior to the girl's disappearance, and by facial features similar to those of her mother, Rochom Soy. Though DNA testing was scheduled at one point, the family later withdrew consent and the DNA tests were never performed.

A visiting Guardian reporter observed that the woman had deep scars on her left wrist and ankle, possibly from being held in captivity, and that her feet did not look as if she had lived in the forest for a long time. She was able to use a spoon without instruction. He called the claim that she was a feral child "almost certainly nonsense", stated that "beyond the family's ardent claims to recognise her, there is no evidence that she is the missing girl", and thought it more likely that she was "a girl brought up in captivity, who somehow escaped, and then found her way to a father who desperately wanted to recover something he had loved and lost." LICADHO, a Cambodian human rights NGO, also believed she might have been a victim of abuse, as the marks on her arms may have been caused by a restraint such as a rope. "We believe that this woman is a victim of some kind of torture, maybe sexual or physical," said Kek Galabru.

== Life after discovery ==
The Pnong follow no organized religion but the family took the woman to a Buddhist pagoda to have monks calm her spirit.

One week after being discovered, she experienced difficulties adjusting to civilized life. A Spanish psychologist who visited the woman reported that she "made some words and smiled in response to a game involving toy animals and a mirror". When she was thirsty or hungry, she pointed at her mouth. She preferred to crawl rather than walk upright. The family watched Rochom P'ngieng around the clock to make sure she did not run off back to the forest, as she tried to do several times. Her mother constantly had to pull back on her clothes when she tried to take them off. A visiting Guardian reporter described the family as genuinely caring for her and the woman as listless and sad but restless at night.

The NGO Licadho feared the woman was enduring trauma after returning to society. Penn Bunna, an official at ADHOC, another Cambodian human rights group, said the constant flow of visitors likely caused stress for the woman. "She must have experienced traumatic events in the jungle that have affected her ability to speak," he said.

On 25 September 2007, Deutsche Presse-Agentur reported that the woman, who had never been able to adjust to village life, had vanished back into the forest without leaving a trace. In February 2008, the Phnom Penh Post reported that the woman had disappeared for a couple of days but had then returned. The Spanish psychologist was still seeing her, and she had adjusted a bit better to her new surroundings, but still would not speak. The father was trying to raise money so that he could take his daughter to a spirit healer who could help exorcise the "forest spirits" from his daughter. Radio Free Asia reported in July 2008 that the woman was able to feed, bathe and dress herself but still would not speak. She laughed while playing with her little nieces and nephews.

In October 2009, Agence France Press reported that the woman had refused to eat rice for a month and was admitted to a hospital, where a nervous condition was diagnosed. Her father said that she had not adjusted, could not speak, and was always trying to remove her clothes and run away. He asked for charities to take over her care.

In December 2009, her father reported that she was eating again, was generally improving, and had started to understand and use some words of their native language.

On 25 May 2010, Rochom P’ngieng fled back to the forest. Her father said that she went to take a bath in the well behind their house and did not return. In early June she was found in a latrine about 100 m (330 ft) from her home after a neighbour heard her crying, Sal Lou, the man who claims to be her father, said. "She was discovered in a 10 m (33 ft) deep toilet. It's an unbelievable story. She spent 11 days there," he said, adding that her body was soaked with excrement up to her chest. "We are still wondering how she could get into the toilet" which has a small entrance hole covered in wood, he said, adding that she had been admitted to hospital following the incident.

In September 2010 it was reported that she was being taught health habits and social skills by members of the Spanish mental health organization Psicólogos Sin Fronteras. A May 2011 report added that she was visited by the psychologists at least once a week. She preferred to live and sleep in a small chicken coop near the family's home, joining the family for meals every three or four days. She did not speak but had started to make eye contact with people.

== Later developments ==
In 2013, Sal Lou died. In July 2016, a man named Pel from Vietnam's Gia Lai province traveled to the village claiming the woman was his missing daughter named Tak. He claimed that she had disappeared in 2006 at age 23, following a mental breakdown, indicating that she had survived in the forest for approximately one year as opposed to the 18–19 previously thought. Pel was able to identify a spot on her lip, the scar on her wrist, and an ear condition, in addition to bringing nine relatives and documentation about Tak's birth details and disappearance to support his claim. The adoptive family was supportive of this new claim.

In August 2016, after immigration officials spent two weeks reviewing the case, the woman left Cambodia with her family and returned to Vietnam. Vietnamese media have reported that her birth father discovered her through photographs on Facebook. The woman never learned to speak while living with her adoptive family in Cambodia, and according to her Vietnamese birth family, she has been that way since birth.

== See also ==
- List of solved missing person cases (2000s)
