= Alliance for Freedom of Expression in Cambodia =

Group of NGO's Cambodia

The Alliance for Freedom of Expression in Cambodia (AFEC) is an alliance of Cambodian non-governmental organizations working to promote in Cambodia:

- freedom of expression;
- freedom of information; and
- freedom of assembly.

The AFEC logo is a yellow ribbon in an "f" shape, signifying freedom. AFEC is coordinated by the Cambodian Center for Human Rights (CCHR) and led by the CCHR's President, Ou Virak.

== Formation ==
AFEC was formed in December 2005 by Ou Virak, in response to the imprisonment of the then President of the Cambodian Center for Human Rights (CCHR) Kem Sokha and others who were accused of defaming the Cambodian government.

== Achievements ==
In December 2005, in response to the imprisonment of the human rights activists, AFEC distributed 100,000 yellow ribbons as a symbol of the need to support freedom of expression throughout Cambodia. The launch of this campaign echoed throughout the world and large numbers of Cambodians wore yellow ribbons to public events sending a clear message to the government that Cambodian civil society did not accept repression against its leading activists. Assisted by international pressure, AFEC succeeded in securing the release of the human rights activists.

In February 2006, AFEC organized a march for freedom of expression that resulted in Cambodian Prime Minister Hun Sen promising to decriminalize defamation. Although prison terms are no longer given in defamation cases, defamation is still a criminal offense. The government can also use other means, such as criminal disinformation and incitement laws, to silence critics of corruption, land grabbing and illegal evictions.

From 25 February to 15 March 2007, AFEC organized a 314-kilometre march from Phnom Penh to Angkor Wat for freedom of expression, non-violence and political tolerance in Cambodia ahead of commune council elections.

On 13 April 2009, a coalition of non-governmental organizations - coordinated by AFEC and assisted by the Asian Legal Resource Centre (ALRC) - made a joint submission on freedom of expression and assembly in Cambodia to the Office of the High Commissioner for Human Rights (OHCHR) in Geneva, for inclusion in its summary of stakeholder information for the purposes of the Universal Periodic Review (UPR) of Cambodia's Human Rights record.

== See also ==
- Cambodian Center for Human Rights
- Ou Virak
- Kem Sokha
- Cambodia
- Human rights in Cambodia
- Khmer Rouge
- Politics of Cambodia
