= Violence against women in Cambodia =

Public health issue of violent acts against women

Violence against women in Cambodia is a serious issue. Cambodia has had a history of violence against women especially due to its past conflicts. During the Pol Pot regime, women were exposed to several different violent acts against them such as forced marriages and rape by the Khmer Rouge officials in Cambodia and refugee camps in Thailand. Presently, there is still a number of different forms of exploitation and discrimination against women in Cambodia such as rape, domestic violence, and human trafficking as the country is recovering from the history of conflict.

== Domestic violence ==
There is a tradition of subservience and inferiority of women to men that makes the issue of domestic violence in Cambodia a complex one. The traditional code of conduct Chbab Srey (Women's Law) has long taught women in Cambodia to be subservient to men. Up until 2007, schools in Cambodia still taught the chbab to young girls in regards to what was expected from them as women. Domestic violence in Cambodia has been identified as having increased in scope and intensity after Pol Pot's control.

In 2008, the national survey showed that over one quarter of women in Cambodia have suffered from domestic violence. The traditional view that women are subservient and inferior makes the issue of domestic violence in Cambodia a complex issue. There is a common saying in Cambodia which expressed the status of inequality between men and women, “Men are gold and women are cloth”. The traditional code of conduct Chbab Srey (Women's Law) somewhat teaches women in Cambodia to be subservient to men. The chbab cautions about leaving girls unsupervised or giving them too much independence and freedom.

Up until 2007, the Chbab was taught within school's curriculum for how women should behave. In a 2014 study, it was shown that the general attitude towards women to stay at home to take care of their children and husband was at 78%. One of the reasons for a woman to stay in a domestic violent relationship is because of the economic reliance on the man.

Generally the men are the predominant income earner in the household, this is extremely common for males in rural areas. 66% of participants in the 2014 survey believed that the wives should remain silent when domestic violence occurred in order to keep the family unit together.

=== National legal mechanism ===
In 2005, Cambodia introduced the legislation called Law on the Prevention of Domestic Violence and the Protection of Victims. In Article 1 of the statute, it provided that the aim was to prevent domestic violence and protect the victims. Article 13 provided some guidelines for authorities in terms of intervention such as offering shelter to the victim, mediating, as well as educating both parties in order to reduce domestic violence from reoccurring. Under Article 16, the victim can file to the Courts for a Protection Order. Article 35, provided that the perpetrator can be charged under the Cambodian penal laws.

However, under Article 36, the victim can request for the charges to be dropped if the offences were “minor misdemeanors or petty crimes”. One of the issue with the domestic violence law in Cambodia is that it is seen as a luxury which women who are of a poor social economic background cannot afford. In terms of implementation of the domestic violence law there have been issues due to the economic dependence on the male as an income provider. Women who initially seek legal help might then back out due to this financial constraint.

A 2014 study showed that 92% of men and 90% of women in Cambodia indicated that they had knowledge of domestic violence laws. However, the study also showed that there was still confusion in regards to women's rights. This was because the survey showed that only 26% of the participants actually knew about women's rights to equal justice and protection under the law. In 2013, Cambodia's Secretary of State for Ministry of Women's Affairs at the 57th Session of the Commission on the Status of Women issued a report in regards to Cambodia's efforts to tackle the issue of violence against women and girls.

At a national level, Cambodia developed the National Action Plan to Prevent Violence Against Women. One focus of the policy was to build on the CEDAW. The aim of the program was to raise public awareness both at a commune and district level. The distribution of information such as laws and support services available to victims and survivors came through media campaigns and informational meetings. This has shown to be of some success, as the 2014 national survey showed that 95% of the participants had a source of knowledge about domestic violence law derived from mass media.

In terms of the gap between knowledge and ignorance of domestic violence law within the country, there are several social and legal conditions that contribute. These factors include: the structural gender inequality, discriminatory attitudes of gender, customs and traditions which are detrimental rather than supportive of domestic violence laws, a weak system of upholding the rule of law, and the inadequacy of financial as well as human resources to support the implementation and enforcement of domestic violence law training.

== Rape ==
Rape is the most common and serious crime in Cambodia. In a UN report released in 2013 showed that 1 in 5 men in Cambodia between the ages of 18 and 49 had admitted that they had raped a woman. A total of 15.8% of those who admitted to having committed a rape had done so when they were younger than 15 years old. “Bauk” is the term used in Cambodia for gang rape. More than double the men in Cambodia admitted to gang rape in comparison to India.

Bauk has been described as an activity amongst Cambodian men as a means of male bonding. These young men would discuss and share their experiences with one another. Subsequently, Bauk has become a socially accepted form of recreation amongst young middle class Cambodian men.

=== National legal framework ===
Legally, rape or an attempt to commit the act is a crime in Cambodia. Rape has been defined as “any sexual act involving penetration carried out through cruelty, coercion or surprise”. The focus of the offence is not on the lack of consent, which means that the judges tend to look at elements of violence in order to convict. A failure to provide evidence of violence and a lack of medical evidence to support this has resulted in judges finding the penetration as consensual.

In terms of the prosecution of the perpetrators, almost 50% of those that had admitted to rape were arrested, while only 28.3% faced imprisonment and 44% did not face any legal consequences. A large number of rapists have escaped criminal liability due to the fact that the occurrence of compensatory payments are made to either the victims or their family in return for waiving their right to complain to the authorities. Another issue with perpetrators not being held liable is due to the corruption within the courts and police. Rapists who are from a wealthy background can bribe law enforcement agents to turn a blind eye.

== International legal mechanisms ==
Cambodia ratified the Convention on the Elimination of All Forms of Discrimination Against Women (CEDAW) in 1992. Non-Governmental Organisations (NGOs) are currently playing an active role in implementing CEDAW in Cambodia. The different type of work that the NGOs have been involved with includes policy and law reforms, health services, gender sensitisation, non-formal education and rights awareness programs. In 1995 the Cambodian NGO Committee on CEDAW (NGO CEDAW) was established to support the Cambodian Office of the United Nations High Commissioner for Human Rights.

Currently there are 79 NGOs members. Their main mission is to establish independent reports on the progress of implementation of CEDAW. Also the Cambodian Committee for Women (CAMBOW) was established in 2000 where their aim was to work alongside NGO CEDAW. CAMBOW is particularly focused on violence against women in Cambodia and used education, training, research and documentation to promote and protect women's rights....
