= Ros Sopheap =

Cambodian women's rights activist

Ros Sopheap (Khmer: រស់ សុភាព; born 1962) is a Cambodian women's rights activist. She is the founder and former executive director of Gender and Development Cambodia (GADC), a non-governmental organisation involved in preventing domestic violence against women and promoting women in leadership roles. During her 20-year career with GADC, she advocated on behalf of women in Cambodia and was central to the Cambodian women's rights movement. Sopheap also served as the president of the Committee to Promote Women in Politics.

== Early life and education ==
Sopheap was born in 1962 in Cambodia. During her schooling, she learned the Chbab Srey, a code of conduct for women written in the form of a poem. (Note: Chbab Srey was taken out of the mandatory curriculum in public schools in 2007. Sopheap later said that it is "supposed to be literature that reflects the reality in the past. Some parts are no longer practical, it's out of date. We need to redefine these rules and practices.") She earned a bachelor's degree in education from the Royal University of Phnom Penh's Institute of Foreign Languages.

== Career ==
Sopheap started her career as an interpreter and project coordinator. During her work as an interpreter for an election monitor during the 1993 Cambodian general election, she was harassed by a United Nations Transitional Authority in Cambodia soldier who followed her in the polling station and later came to her residence in Phnom Penh.

During the mid-1990s, Sopheap served as a Ministry of Information official. Afterwards, she worked with local and international organisations as a project coordinator, researcher, and interpreter.

=== Gender and Development Cambodia ===
In 1995, Sopheap worked as a research facilitator for a project on domestic violence, the first project of its kind in Cambodia. She became interested in the roots of gender-based violence during the project. According to Sopheap, "I spent six months with villagers in six provinces to survey domestic violence. I started to understand more about domestic violence and hear [women's] stories." Beginning in 1997, she spent three years as a gender training coordinator with Gender and Development Cambodia (GADC), then a semi-autonomous program of the Cooperation Committee for Cambodia. Sopheap established the GADC as a local non-governmental organization (NGO) in Phnom Penh in early 2000. The GADC works to prevent domestic violence against women and promotes women in leadership roles, especially young women. In addition to its awareness campaigns for gender equality and women's rights, the organisation provides legal assistance and education.

During her tenure as executive director of GADC, Sopheap has been central to the Cambodian women's rights movement.

In 2014, GADC held a cycling event against domestic violence as part of the global campaign One Billion Rising. The event was broken up by police and private security guards. Sopheap said in response "the government response this morning does not illustrate commitment that the governments declare in [the] Convention on the Elimination of all Forms of Discrimination against Women (CEDAW), Universal declaration of Human Rights and [the] Cambodian constitution." During a 2018 campaign by UN Women to increase awareness of violence against women and children, GADC participated in the provinces of Battambang, Kampong Chhnang, Prey Veng, and Pursat. GADC also set up women's support groups called Gender Cafes in various provinces. Through the GADC, Sopheap worked to launch a project designed to improve women's economic independence, Empowerment of Women through Small Economic Empowerment Projects in Kampong Chhnang, Prey Veng, and Pursat, using Oxfam's gender action learning system.

Sopheap retired from her position as executive director of GADC in 2021.

=== Committee to Promote Women in Politics and NGOs ===
Sopheap served as the president of the Committee to Promote Women in Politics and worked with the non-governmental organisations Khemara and CARE.

== Advocacy for women's rights ==
Sopheap is a vocal advocate for women's rights and is frequently quoted by journalists writing about women's issues in Cambodia. She has called for more governmental funding of services for victims of gender-based violence and legal protection for survivors of domestic violence. She advocated for a ban on the commercial surrogacy industry in Cambodia and spoke out against the jailing of surrogate mothers. She has advocated for the rights of working women to breastfeed, and linked the prevalence of hymenoplasty procedures in Cambodia to cultural expectations that women be virgins. Sopheap has called for action in addressing gender disparities in educational opportunities and preventing perpetrators of acid attacks from acquiring dangerous substances. She fought against a proposed law to regulate NGOs in 2015.
