= Khan Russey Keo =

Russey Keo ឫស្សីកែវ
- District
- Russey Keo District; Khan Russey Keo ខណ្ឌឫស្សីកែវ
- Location of Russey Keo within Phnom Penh

- Location within Cambodia
- Coordinates: 11°37′10″N 104°54′36″E
- Country: Cambodia
- Province: Phnom Penh

Area
  - Total: 23.3 km^{2} (9.0 sq mi)

Population (2019)
  - Total: 274,861
- Time zone: UTC+7 (ICT)
- Postal code: 12100
- Geocode: 1207

Russey Keo (Khmer: ប្ញស្សីកែវ [ʔrɨhsəj kaew]; meaning "Crystal Bamboo"), also spelled as Russei Keo, is a district (khan) in Phnom Penh, Cambodia. This district consists of the northern and north-eastern outskirts of the main city of Phnom Penh, stretching from Khan Sen Sok in the west to the Tonlé Sap River in the east. As of 2019, it is the most populous district of Phnom Penh.

== History ==
=== Two legends of the Royal Chronicles: the origins of the Emerald Buddha ===
There are two occurrences of Russey Keo in the Cambodian Royal Chronicles.

The first occurrence is in the story of legendary king Baksei Chamkrong; Baksey Chamkrong escapes from Angkor and finds refuge on Phnom Baset, southwest of Oudong, before fleeing to the island of Russey Keo where he was surrounded by his opponents.

The second occurrence of Russey Keo mentions this area as the settlement of Buddhagosa, who landed on Russey Keo after a storm disrupted his travels sailing from Langka to Laos. It is during this trip that he was travelling with various treasures, "jewels of sacred fire", such as several sacred texts of the Pali canon the Ounalom, Buddha's synophrys or unibrow, which gave their name to two local pagodas Wat Ounalom and Wat Langka. The Khmer King Batum Soryavong then came to help these settlements, and invited the monk to settle in Angkor with the statue of the Emerald Buddha, the Phra Kaeo Morakot, etiologically giving its name to the area.

=== The foreigner's settlement along the Tonle Sap since the 17th century ===
Russey Keo, on the banks of the Tonle Sap River, is where the Dutch merchants established in the 17th century, given its name to one of the neighbourhoods of the district, Hoaland. The Catholic missionaries established their first parish called Saint Joseph's Catholic Church through a gift of land from King Norodom in 1867. Russey Keo district, soon became a gathering point for Annamites of all religious persuasions, the home of Phnom Penh cathedral and many pagodas.

=== The dredging and developing of a new urban neighbourhood since 1990 ===
Russey Keo has experienced dramatic urban development since the 1990s, including land reclamation. In March 1991, the People's Committee of Phnom Penh recommended the dredging of zones in Russey Keo, and in May 1991, the Cabinet Council of Ministers of Cambodia authorized the pumping of sand to enlarge the city. These developments have also giving rise to forced evictions and a certain number of land disputes, as those between collective groups of people and their Chief of Village who allegedly sold communal land and kept the money. Among these major developments, Camko City is an urban development zone being developed by a consortium spearheaded by World City Co., Ltd of South Korea in the Russey Keo district. It has a projected investment valued at $2.063 billion.

== Administration ==
According to the 1998 census, Russey Keo consisted of 12 communes (sangkats) with a total population of 180,076; in 2008–2009 three sangkats—Khmuonh, Phnom Penh Thmei and Tuek Thla—formed Khan Sen Sok and the population recorded by the 2008 census in the resulting nine-Sangkat area was 175,295.

In 2008, the number of Khans (districts) in Phnom Penh increased from 7 to 8, with the division of Russey Keo District into two: Russey Keo and Sen Sok.

In 2010, Bak Kaeng and Koh Dach communes were added to the Khan from Mukh Kampul District, Kandal Province. In 2013, both sangkats, along with Chroy Changvar, Preaek Lieb and Preaek Ta Sek, formed a new entity, Khan Chroy Changvar, taking Russey Keo's number of Sangkats to six. In 2016, Tuol Sangkae was split in two separate Sangkats, Tuol Sangkae I and Tuol Sangkae II.

As of 2020, Russey Keo is subdivided into seven communes (sangkats) and 30 villages (phums).

Geocode	Commune	Village
120703	Svay Pak	La Kambaor, Lu, Svay Pak
120704	Kilomet Prammouy	Kraol Kou, Spean Khpos, Boeung Chhuk
120706	Russey Keo	Mittapheap, Samakki, Khleang Sang, Boeung Salang
120711	Chrang Chamreh I	Phum I, Phum II, Phum II, Phum IV
120712	Chrang Chamreh II	Phum Ka, Phum Kha I, Phum Kha II, Phum Koa
120713	Tuol Sangkae I	Phsar Touch, Tuol Sangkae, Tuol Kork, Chong Khsach, Bak Touk, Tuol Sampov
120714	Tuol Sangkae II	Kongkea Phos, Kos Andaet, Pong Peav, Boeung Rang, Tuol Porpae, Tuol Thgan

== See also ==
- Chroy Changva District
