= Ou Virak =

Cambodian activist (born 1976)

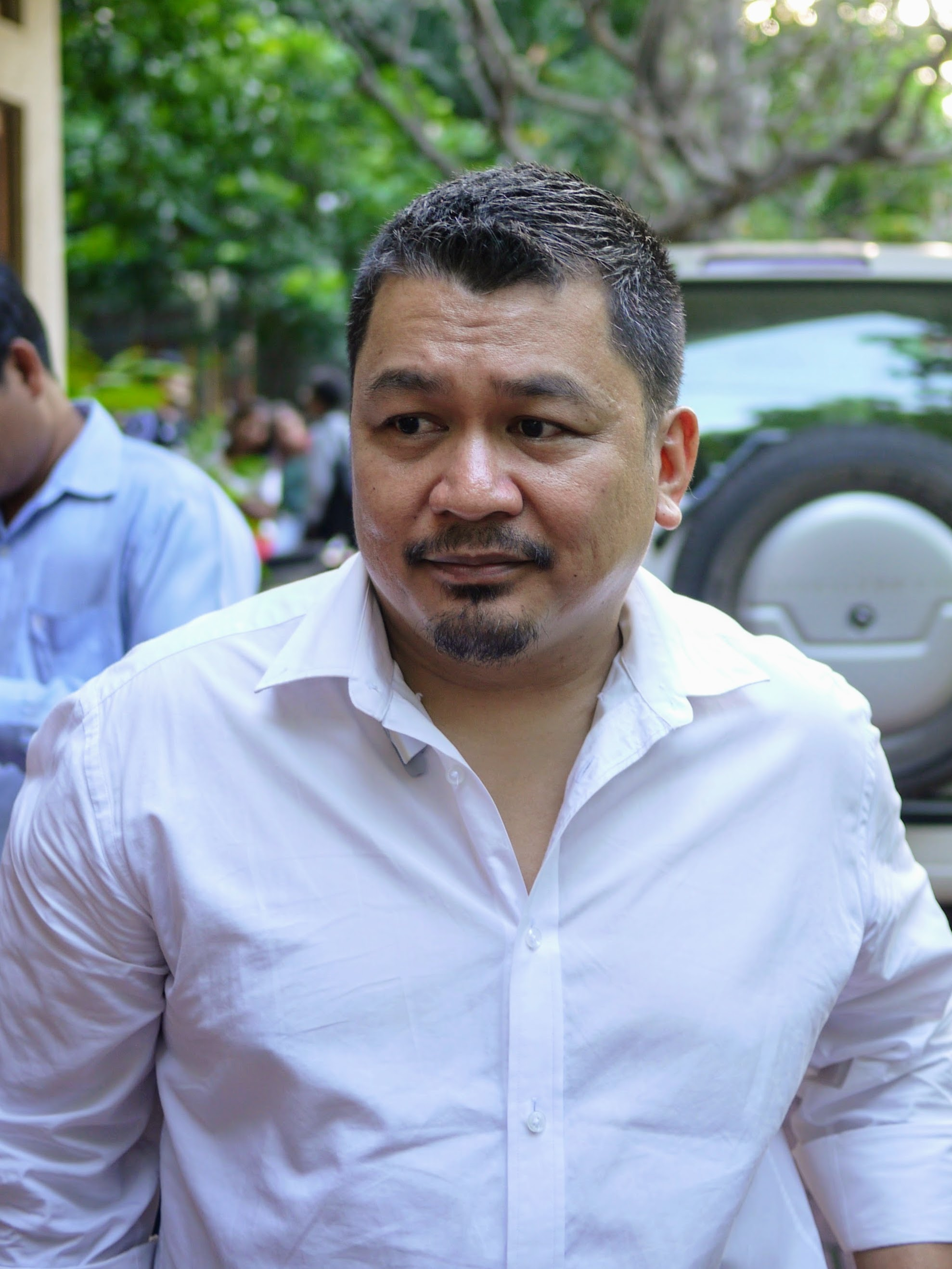
- Ou Virak at Konrad Adenauer Stiftung Phnom Penh in November 2017
- Born: January 7, 1976 (age 50)
- Education: B.A., California State University, Fresno; M.A., San Jose State University
- Organization: Cambodian Center for Human Rights
- Known for: Human rights activism
- Awards: Reebok Human Rights Award (2007)

Ou Virak (Khmer: អ៊ូ វីរៈ; born 7 January 1976) is a Cambodian public intellectual and human rights activist, currently serving as the President of Future Forum, a think tank dedicated to public policy issues. He is also the founder of the Alliance for Freedom of Expression in Cambodia (AFEC), and winner of the Reebok Human Rights Award for his civil society campaign for freedom of expression and for the release of human rights advocates imprisoned for criticizing the Cambodian government.

== Early life ==
Born in Cambodia during the first year of Khmer Rouge rule, Virak's father - an officer in the army of the Lon Nol regime - was murdered by the Khmer Rouge before Virak was born. Virak lived through Khmer Rouge rule with his mother and four older brothers. Facing persecution during the occupation of Cambodia by Vietnam, they fled to refugee camps in Thailand before being granted refugee status and moving to Fresno, California in 1989 when Virak was 13.

Virak attended Theodore Roosevelt High School in Fresno, California. He went on to receive a B.A. in economics from California State University, Fresno and an M.A. in Economics from San Jose State University. Whilst at university, he was Vice-President of the National Cambodian Student Association.

== Career as a human rights activist ==
Working in law and public welfare, Virak then returned to Cambodia to lecture on economics at Pannasastra University, Phnom Penh. He joined the Cambodian Center for Human Rights (CCHR) as Advocacy and Public Relations Director in 2005, and became its President in 2007. In 2007, he was the winner of the Reebok Human Rights Award for his civil society campaign for freedom of expression and for the release of human rights advocates imprisoned for criticizing the Cambodian government.

Virak leads the Alliance for Freedom of Expression in Cambodia (AFEC), working with other NGOs to promote and protect freedom of expression, information and assembly in Cambodia. He is the Vice-Chairman of the Cambodian NGO Working Group for establishing a National Human Rights Commission and ASEAN Human Rights Body, and represents this NGO Working Group to the Cambodian Joint Government-NGO Working Group for establishing a National Human Rights Commission and ASEAN Human Rights Body. Virak also represents the Cambodian NGO Working Group for establishing a National Human Rights Commission and ASEAN Human Rights Body to the Working Group for an ASEAN Human Rights Mechanism.

== See also ==
- Cambodian Center for Human Rights
- Human rights in Cambodia
- Politics of Cambodia
- Kem Sokha
