= Santhormok High School =

Chea Simsanthormok High School
- វិទ្យាល័យជាស៊ីមសន្ធរម៉ុក
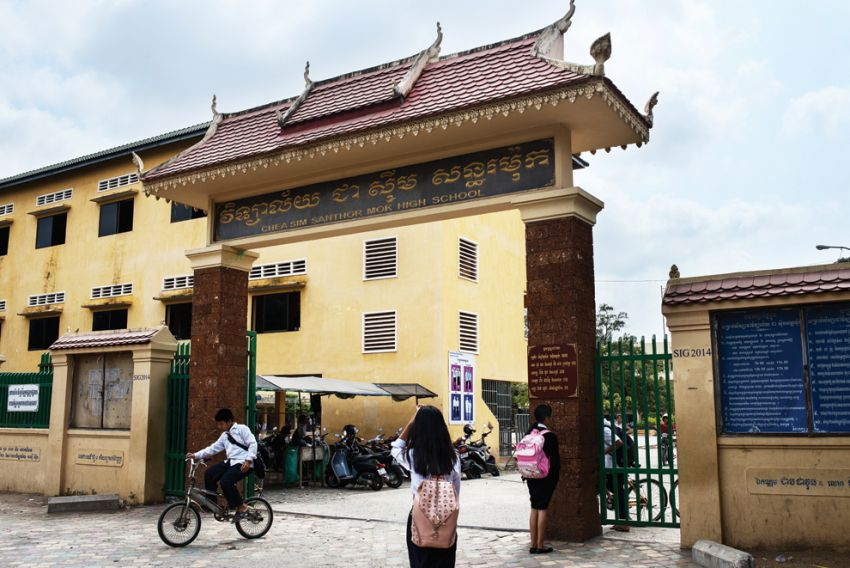
- Kampuchea Krom Blvd (128), Tuek L'ak I Tuol Kouk, Phnom Penh 120404; Cambodia

Information
- School type: Public secondary
- Principal: Lao molyna
- Grades: 7th–12th
- Gender: Mixed
- Sports: Soccer

11.56678°N 104.898749°E

Santhormok High School (Khmer: វិទ្យាល័យសន្ធរម៉ុក) is a public secondary school located on Kampuchea Krom Blvd in Tuol Kouk, Phnom Penh.

The school educates students from grade 7 to 12. With 5 study buildings and 1 staff building the school is cover about 120x130 meters of land.

== Sports ==
Santhormok High School is rich of sport students. Due to the facility of the school such as soccer field and basketball field, santhormok high school is one of the strongest high school sport team in Cambodia.

=== Football ===
Santhormok High School got its own football league which is not officially created under the school management but under the arrangement of soccer teams in Santhormok High School.

==== Santhormok high school football league ====
Team	Logo	Facebook Page	Notes
Black Eagle football team			
Et Jay United			
Thunderstorm United		https://www.facebook.com/Thunderstorm-United-1671897766392369/	This page creator.
Revolution football team			
Depro football team			
Titan football team			
Ko dot football team			
Assassin football team			
F.S.T Griffin United			
Revenger FT			
