= Kek Galabru =

Cambodian physician and human rights activist

Kek Galabru, known in her native Khmer language as Pung Chhiv Kek (Khmer: ពុង ឈីវកេក, born October 4, 1942), is a Cambodian woman and human rights activist who played a critical role in bringing peace to Cambodia after years of Civil War. As the founder of the Cambodian League for the Promotion and Defence of Human Rights (LICADHO), She is considered "one of Cambodia's foremost defenders of human rights" while others have referred to her as "the archetype of the femme fatale".

Pung Chhiv Kek Galabru and Eva Galabru were extremely helpful under very difficult circumstances and they have my utmost admiration for the tremendous work they do to further the cause and practice of human rights.

— Kenneth Christie

== Biography ==
=== An aristocratic family background with ties to the Royal Palace ===
Pung Chhiv Kek was born on October 4, 1942, in Phnom Penh, as the eldest daughter of an aristocratic family with two daughters. Her father, Pung Peng Cheng, was a teacher who later served as secretary of state at the Ministry of Education and Ministry of Information. Her mother, Siv Eng Tong, was the royal nanny of the future king of Cambodia, Prince Sihamoni. She was trained as a teacher, and later became the first female lawmaker, before becoming the Minister of Social Affairs and the Minister of Health.

=== A Cambodian woman in exile ===
After obtaining her Cambodian and French baccalaureate in 1960, Pung Chhiv Kek was sent to France to study medicine and graduated from medical school in Angers. While working as a doctor in Phnom Penh from 1968 to 1971, she was co-director of the Sihanoukist newspaper Le Contre-Gouvernement from 1968 to 1970. She them moved to work in Canada as Civil War broke out in Cambodia.

She went on to specialize in hematology in Paris in 1973. In 1975, she bought a liquor store in Paris called "La Cave des Pyrénées".

=== A peacemaker between Sihanouk and Hun Sen ===
In the late 1970s, Madame Kek met her late husband Jean-Jacques Galabru in Paris and followed him to various posts abroad. In a turn of events which remains a rather "untold story" of Cambodia, this former diplomat and his wife flew to Phnom Penh in early 1987 to meet Hun Sen, in order to organize a meeting between Prime Minister Hun Sen and then-Prince Norodom Sihanouk in December 1987 at Fère-en-Tardenois, north of Paris for talks that eventually led to the 1991 Paris Peace Accords. While her husband had met Hun Sen in 1982 during his tenure in Angola, Kek Galabru had kept close ties with Sihanouk during his exile in Beijing.

In October 1989, she was appointed as a special envoy of the State of Cambodia to represent Khmer interests in France and in Europe.

=== A constant defender of human rights in Cambodia since 1992 ===
In 1992, Kek Galabru returned permanently to Cambodia after having spent more than twenty years abroad. She drew on her networks in France for funding, approaches and ideas in order to found the rights group Licadho on 10 December 1992 which was intended "to monitor the Khmer Rouge following the peace agreement." She criticized the moving of the Khmer Rouge Tribunal in the Extraordinary Chambers in the Courts of Cambodia to a military base miles away from the city center as she argued that this would not help witnesses and victims feel safe. She has since signaled human rights abuses under the watch of the United Nations Transitional Authority in Cambodia as well as taking a courageous stance to defend the freedom of the press after the restoration of the monarchy, as was seen when she criticized government's suspension of the Kampuchea Bulletin as "undemocratic". With the development of Phnom Penh, much of her work has been dedicated to seeking compensation for evictions, often adversely affecting women with children, such as in the case of the White Building

She was a special adviser to Prince Ranariddh and was in charge of international cooperation and foreign aid from September 1993 to January 1994.

Around 2015, she was seen as a neutral referee in the ongoing political dispute between the Cambodian ruling party and the opposition. Since the departure of Chheng Phon who died in 2016, dissatisfaction had grown against the independence of the National Election Committee. While the Cambodian National Rescue Party and the Cambodian People's Party had jointly accepted to appoint Kek Galabru as the ninth member of the National Election Committee, her dual citizenship prevented her from this contention as she holds both French and Canadian citizenships on top of our Khmer citizenship.

== Contribution: a life given for the dignity of all women ==
When Kek Galabru graduated from medical school in France, she became the first Cambodian woman ever to be qualified as a doctor. Already her own mother had been the first female member of a Cambodian government. She has been consistent in defending the dignity of women in Cambodia and she is considered to have "played a significant role in bringing domestic violence law to fruition". While she believes that women's rights in Cambodia can often be hostage of religion and tradition, she is critical of the Chbab Srey, a Cambodian code of conduct for women which has fostered widespread and long-lasting subservience and inferiority of women to men thus contributing to domestic violence. She has persevered in her advocacy despite threats and intimidations:

It could be easy for us to take our suitcases, pack and then take an airplane and not look back. But then we said, "Impossible, they trust us." [...] If we only save one person - it's a victory.

— Kek Galabru

== Family ==
Kek Galabru has three daughters, Naly Pilorge, who is currently the outreach director of LICADHO, her second child, Rozenn Pilorge, and another daughter, Eva Galabru.

== Awards and recognition ==
In 2016, Kek Galabru was awarded the Legion d’Honneur, France’s highest decoration, for services to peace-building and human rights.

== Bibliography ==
- Kek Galabru, The situation of women in Cambodia, Phnom Penh: LIChaDO (Cambodian League for the promotion and Defense of human rights), July 2004, pp. 31–32.
- Kek Galabru at IMDb
