= Cambodian Center for Human Rights =

Cambodian non-governmental organization

- មជ្ឈមណ្ឌលសិទ្ធិមនុស្សកម្ពុជា
- Founded: 3 October 2002; 23 years ago
- Founder: Kem Sokha
- Type: Non-profit; NGO
- Location: Phnom Penh, Cambodia
- Services: Protecting human rights
- Fields: Media attention, direct-appeal campaigns, research, lobbying
- Key people: Chak Sopheap (Executive Director)
- Website: www.cchrcambodia.org

The Cambodian Center for Human Rights (CCHR; Khmer: មជ្ឈមណ្ឌលសិទ្ធិមនុស្សកម្ពុជា, romanized: mochchhomondal setthimnoussa kampouchea) is a non-partisan, independent, non-governmental organization that works to promote and protect democracy and respect for human rights throughout Cambodia. It focuses primarily on civil and political rights and on a variety of interlinked human rights issues. The white bird flying out of a circle of sky blue on the logo of the organization symbolizes Cambodia’s quest for freedom.

CCHR was registered with the Ministry of Interior in October 2002 and officially launched on 12 November 2002. Since its foundation, CCHR’s emphasis has been on empowering communities, being the first NGO to facilitate “public forums” throughout Cambodia. These public forums were broadcast on Voice of Democracy (“VOD”), a radio program established by CCHR in 2003. In June 2007 the Cambodian Center for Independent Media (“CCIM”) was founded to operate VOD as an independent radio station.

CCHR's core focus areas include protecting fundamental freedoms; judicial and legislative reform; equality and discrimination; business and human rights; and political participation, rights and reform.

== Vision ==
CCHR's vision is of a non-violent Cambodia in which all people can enjoy the fundamental human rights to which they are entitled, all are subject to the rule of law without impunity, all are treated equally without discrimination, all are empowered to participate fully in the democratic process, and all can share in the benefits of Cambodia's ongoing economic development.

== Mission ==
To promote and protect respect for democracy and human rights – primarily civil and political rights, for the benefit of all those living in Cambodia.

== Thematic Areas ==
=== Protecting Fundamental Freedoms ===
Despite clear protection for fundamental freedoms, including the rights to peaceful assembly, association and expression, in the UDHR, the ICCPR (as incorporated into Cambodian law) and the Constitution of the Kingdom of Cambodia, these freedoms have been substantially restricted in Cambodia over the past years.

The judicial system has also frequently been used to harass individuals critical of the RGC. Human Rights Defenders, journalists, union leaders, land rights activists and the political opposition are often subject to arrest, charges and imprisonment, including for incitement or criminal damage.

CCHR's work in this area strives to address restrictions on and violations of fundamental freedoms encountered by Human Rights Defenders and peaceful protestors. It does so through awareness raising of instances of rights violations in order to engage decision-makers in judicial reform, advocating against repressive laws such as the Law on Associations and NGOs (“LANGO”) and the Trade Union Law, and by increasing public demand for the realization of fundamental freedoms in Cambodia nationally and internationally.

=== The Judiciary ===
CCHR is widely respected for its expertise in legal analysis, both of judicial hearings – with the continual breaches of fair trial rights and due process – and of new and pending repressive legislation which infringe upon human rights.

In general, the Cambodian courts are seen to be non-independent, incompetent and biased. Politically motivated cases have been brought against opposition politicians, land-rights activists and those who speak out in defense of human rights. Conversely, those with government connections or positions of authority have enjoyed impunity, even when they have been linked to serious criminal offenses.

The Law on the Organization and Functioning of the Supreme Council of the Magistracy, and the Law on the Statute of Judges and Prosecutors (the “Judicial Laws”) grant excessive powers to the Ministry of Justice and the Supreme Council of the Magistracy. There are grave concerns about the level of influence that the Ministry of Justice now has over judges and prosecutors, violating the principle of the separation of powers and thereby undermining judicial independence.

=== Business and Human Rights (“BHR”) ===
Many of the human rights violations occurring in Cambodia result from the activities and operations of private sector actors. Since Cambodia has traditionally had a predominantly rural population and a small-scale agricultural economy, many poor and vulnerable communities are now being disenfranchised and marginalized by such rapid development.

CCHR's Business and Human Rights projects have historically worked towards the goal of achieving an increase in the demand of the public – in Cambodia and abroad – for the respect of human rights by garment factories operating in Cambodia and the incorporation of the GPs into the policies and day-to-day operations of garment factories. This is expanding to include the overall impact of business and investment on the human rights landscape in Cambodia at a time when domestic and international investment and development are booming in a country where the rule of law is severely lacking.

=== Land and Natural Resources Rights ===
Land rights violations remain one of the most prominent and prevalent form of human rights violations in Cambodia. Despite protection of land rights under domestic and international law, large swathes of the country have been leased for commercial exploitation through notorious and opaque economic land concessions. Insecurity of land tenure (due to a widespread lack of formal land titles), almost complete impunity for abusers of land rights, and weak law enforcement have all further contributed to forced land evictions, illegal land grabs and land disputes. The weak, marginalized and vulnerable very seldom come out on top. Often, individuals challenging land claims by powerful business interests are met with harassment, judicial and physical attacks, with perpetrators of land rights and other human rights abuses rarely held to account. CCHR supports land rights activists who are suffering from human rights violations, including through its HRD protection mechanism and fund.

=== Equality and Discrimination ===
While homosexuality is not criminalized in Cambodia, Lesbian, Gay, Bisexual, Transgender, Intersex and Queer (“LGBTIQ”) people have continued to report suffering from discrimination and abuse with respect to sexual orientation and gender identity and expression (“SOGIE”), and there is as yet no anti-hate crime legislation prohibiting discrimination on the grounds of SOGIE.

CCHR is very well known for its work on SOGIE. For many years now it has run a highly effective SOGIE Project that promotes and protects the human rights of LGBTIQ people in Cambodia who currently face significant discrimination. It does so by supporting LGBTIQ activists and victims and empowering them to advocate for their own human rights.

Women in Cambodia continue to face considerable rights violations. Little effort has been made to end the culture of domestic abuse in Cambodia, and domestic violence and rape occur at high rates. While there is strong legislation in place to combat these issues, such as the Law on the Prevention of Domestic Violence and the Protection of Victims 2005,44 cases of domestic violence and rape very rarely go to trial.

CCHR is also developing programs to work on ethnic and minority rights, focusing particularly on the disturbing trend towards anti-Vietnamese rhetoric and racism that has cast a shadow over Cambodia since the start of the political campaign for the 2013 National Assembly elections – an area in which CCHR established a principled and authoritative voice in the aftermath of the 2013 elections – as well as on the rights of the beleaguered Khmer Krom minority in southern Vietnam.

=== Human Rights Defenders (“HRDs”) ===
The UN Declaration on HRDs (the “HRD Declaration”) reaffirms the right to promote and strive for the protection and realization of human rights and fundamental freedoms, the rights to freedom of expression and peaceful assembly, and the right to form, join and participate in NGOs, associations or groups. In addition, according to Article 12(2) of the HRD Declaration, the relevant authorities must protect HRDs from arrest, violence, threats, retaliation and any discrimination arising from their HRD activities, and the HRD Declaration emphasizes that HRDs ought to be protected under national law. However, the RGC has not developed any policies or independent mechanisms to protect HRDs, who continue to face threats, harassment and physical violence.

=== Human Rights Education ===
There is still a worrying lack of understanding of human rights among Cambodians, including those in positions of power in the public, private and NGO sectors. Most importantly, there is a fundamental lack of awareness – whether willful or not – of international human rights law and its incorporation into Cambodian domestic law by the Cambodian judiciary. There is also an urgent need for human rights discourse to be depersonalized, with human rights viewed as a conversation topic that is respectable and inspiring rather than dirty and subversive.

=== Information and Communications Technology (“ICT”) and Digital Rights ===
CCHR's work in this area is cross-cutting with its protecting fundamental freedoms work. Many of the HRDs now being threatened and judicially harassed are online activists, targeted in response to politically sensitive posts on Facebook and Twitter. CCHR advocates against restrictive legislation and trains HRDs in the use of ICT tools and protocols.

== History ==
=== Kem Sokha ===
CCHR was founded in 2002 by Kem Sokha, a member of the National Assembly from 1993 to 1998, a member of the Senate from 1999 to 2002, leader of the Human Rights Party (the “HRP”) from 2007, vice-president of the new opposition, the Cambodia National Rescue Party (the “CNRP”), from 2012 until the present day, and former first vice-president of the National Assembly from 2014 to 2015. CCHR was officially registered with the Ministry of Interior in October 2002 and launched on 12 November 2002 to promote and protect democracy and human rights in Cambodia. It has since been governed by an impressive Board of Directors who share a passion for human rights and Cambodia.

They became the key project of CCHR's Community Empowerment Program (the “CEP”). In December 2006, Kem Sokha and other civil rights leaders were arrested and imprisoned for allegedly defaming the Royal Government of Cambodia (the “RGC”). They were released after a campaign led by CCHR's next President, Ou Virak.

=== Ou Virak ===
From April 2007 to December 2013 Ou Virak was CCHR President. He was the founder of the Alliance for Freedom of Expression in Cambodia, and in 2007 won the Reebok Human Rights Award for his earlier campaign to secure both the release of the previous President of CCHR, Kem Sokha, and others from prison and the decriminalization of defamation in Cambodia. In January 2014 until December 2014, he served as chair of the Board of Directors, during a year-long transition period when Chak Sopheap, one of Cambodia's pre-eminent female bloggers and a seasoned human rights and democracy activist, was appointed executive director and took over the day-to-day leadership of CCHR. Ou Virak then resigned from the board of directors in December 2014.

=== Chak Sopheap ===
Chak Sopheap has been the executive director of CCHR since March 2014. As one of the country's most prominent human rights advocates, her work has been recognized by United States President Barack Obama, as well as by Cambodian civil society and the Cambodian people.

Sopheap holds two bachelor's degrees in International Relations and Economics and a master's degree in International Peace Studies, which she completed at the International University of Japan. Sopheap also ran the Cambodian Youth Network for Change, which mobilized young activists around the country for greater civic engagement, until 2009 and is currently a contributing author to Global Voices Online and Future Challenges. Sopheap joined CCHR in late 2005 as an Advocacy Assistant, and later became an Advocacy Officer. In 2008, she left CCHR to continue her graduate studies in Japan and she rejoined CCHR in the middle of 2010 as the Executive Assistant, eventually becoming the Program Director in October 2011, leading to her current position.

== Governance ==
CCHR is governed according to its constitution and by-laws. It has a board of directors and a panel of Counselors – successful and influential individuals who have a passion for human rights and support CCHR's work. CCHR is managed day-to-day by the Management Committee, composed of the executive director, Chak Sopheap, the Finance Director, Khan Kalina, and the Senior Researcher, Chor Chanthyda.

=== Board of directors ===
The Board of Directors includes:

- Yun Mane, a graduate of the Royal University of Law and Economics, is the chair of the board of the Cambodia Indigenous Youth Association and a board member of the Organization to Promote Kui Culture. Mane spent three and a half years working with the United Nations Development Program Regional Indigenous People Program and two years as a Program Officer with the International Labour Organization Support to Indigenous Peoples Project.
- Prok Vanny is a member of the Working Group for Peace and she also sits on the board of directors for a number of NGOs, including the Cambodian Center for Human Rights. Vanny was formerly a consultant for the Project to Promote Women's Political Representation in Cambodia, at the Cambodian Center for Human Rights (CCHR). Prior to working at CCHR, Vanny was a trainer on a variety of subjects including community development; results-based management; gender concepts; gender sensitivity; proposal writing; strategic planning and project management. As the executive director for the local NGO, Khemara and also as a National Coordinator on the Convention on the Elimination of Discrimination Against Women.
- Heng Sreang is an independent researcher, currently working as a lecturer and undergraduate student advisor at Paññāsāstra University of Cambodia since 2004. In addition to teaching and researching, Heng Sreang is also the President of PEN Cambodia and a volunteer for PEN International, an international literary association based in London. From 2006 to 2008, Heng Sreang worked as a content reviewer and editor for the Center for Khmer Studies in Phnom Penh. He is currently a Ph.D. Candidate in Entrepreneurship and Economic Development at the Free University of Amsterdam in The Netherlands.
- Sann Kalyan is a researcher and consultant specialising in human rights issues including land eviction, freedom of expression and freedom of information. Previously, she was an experienced researcher and Editor to Documentation Centre of Cambodia (“DCCam”)'s monthly magazine. After leaving DCCam, she worked as research assistant/researcher for a number of international organisations including Human Rights Watch and Internews Europe. She has a master's degree in International Museum Studies from Göteborg University, Sweden.

=== Counsellors ===
The CCHR also has a group of Counsellors – successful and influential individuals who have a passion for human rights and support the CCHR's work - including:

- Sopheal Ear, an assistant professor at the US Naval Postgraduate School's Department of National Security Affairs. He has experience working for the World Bank, the Asian Development Bank and the United Nations Development Programme on post-conflict countries and specializes in Southeast Asia. Sophal received his Ph.D. in political science from the University of California, Berkeley in 2006.
- Jonathan Aitken, an author and broadcaster, Director of Prison Fellowship International, executive director of the Trinity Forum in Europe, Honorary President of Christian Solidarity Worldwide, Chairman of the Centre for Social Justice’s policy study group on Prison reform, and former British Member of Parliament and Cabinet Minister;
- Barbara Crossette, a journalist and author, The New York Times bureau chief at the United Nations from 1994 to 2001 and former chief correspondent in Southeast Asia and South Asia, and winner of the George Polk Award (1991), The Silurians 25-Year Achievement Award (1998), the Business Council of the United Nations Korn Ferry Award (1998), and the United Nations Correspondents Association lifetime achievement award (2003); and
- Wayne Jordash, a British international criminal defence lawyer who has represented clients in the United Kingdom, the International Criminal Tribunal for Rwanda, the International Criminal Tribunal for Yugoslavia and the Special Court for Sierra Leone.

=== Management Committee ===
CCHR is managed day to day by the Management Committee, composed of the Executive Director, Chak Sopheap, the Finance Director, Khan Kalina, and the Program Director, Chor Chanthyda.

== Affiliations and Cooperation ==
CCHR is informally affiliated to and cooperates with a number of national, regional and international organizations. These relationships strengthen its work to promote and protect human rights in Cambodia. For example, CCHR is a member of the International Freedom of Expression Exchange (“IFEX”), the global network for freedom of expression, the World Organization Against Torture (“OMCT”), SOS-Torture Network, and of the Southeast Asia Press Alliance (“SEAPA”).

== Donors and Supporters ==
The CCHR's donors include the United States Agency for International Development (“USAID”); the European Union (“EU”); the International Center for Not-For-Profit Law (“ICNL”); the Swedish Association for Sexuality Education (“RFSU”); the Fair, Green and Global Alliance at the Dutch Ministry of Foreign Affairs; Deutsche Gesellschaft für Internationale Zusammenarbeit (“GIZ”); Canadian Journalists for Free Expression/International Freedom of Expression; Open Society Foundations; Diakonia; Freedom House, and Action Aid.

== See also ==
- Cambodia
- Human rights in Cambodia
- Khmer Rouge
- Politics of Cambodia
- Ou Virak
- Kem Sokha
- Ros Sopheap
