= ADHOC =

Cambodian human rights organization

The Cambodian Human Rights and Development Association (ADHOC) is Cambodia's oldest human rights organization. It was founded by a group of former political prisoners, led by Thun Saray in December 1991, shortly after the signing of the 1991 Paris Peace Agreements, which put an end to the long-running Cambodian Civil War.

ADHOC is independent, non-partisan, non-profit and non-governmental. It sets out to monitor and investigate human rights violations; provide free legal assistance and support to victims, survivors and their families; empower individuals and communities to enable them to defend their rights, and engage in advocacy work through its Central Office (located in Phnom Penh) and 17 provincial offices.

ADHOC has two main sections: The Human Rights and Land Rights Section and the Women and Children's Rights Section. The Human Rights and Land Rights Section handles complaints of human rights abuses (particularly, extrajudicial killings, arbitrary arrest and detention, torture, impunity and violations of fundamental freedoms) and cases of land and natural resources rights violations (including land grabbing, forced evictions and the destruction of natural resources).

== History ==
ADHOC's first office was in a Buddhist temple in Phnom Penh. The organization's leaders, some of whom had been imprisoned for peacefully exercising their right to free speech, faced severe intimidation by local authorities.

By 1992, ADHOC had expanded its support for victims of human rights violations, was actively reminding the government of its democratic and legal duties, and was officially registered.

== Facilities ==
ADHOC maintains offices in 22 Cambodian provinces and municipalities.

== Activities ==
The organization has been working on issues such as land grabbing, torture, human trafficking, domestic violence, rape, and violations of the freedom of expression and the freedom of assembly. It investigates cases of human rights violations and provides legal aid, social, material and medical assistance to victims. On the Extraordinary Chambers in the Courts of Cambodia, the organization has provided civil parties with psychological counseling and legal aid. The Cambodian Human Rights and Development Association intends to change policies and practices of democratic institutions, especially of the judicial system.

ADHOC receives funding from European (Oxfam Novib, Oxfam GB, Diakonia, DANIDA, DCA-CA, the European Union, Misereor, Comité catholique contre la faim et pour le développement (CCFD), the French Embassy, the British Embassy, etc.), American (USAID though The Asia Foundation and EWMI), and international partners (United Nations Voluntary Fund for Victims of Torture, or UNVFVT).

ADHOC staff have frequently been harassed and intimidated by the authorities. Several employees have faced legal proceedings following the assistance they provided to victims of land grabbing.

ADHOC also works with international organizations and Cambodian and international NGOs, including the Cambodian League for the Promotion and Defense of Human Rights (LICADHO) and CCHR. ADHOC is a member of Forum-Asia and the International Federation for Human Rights (Fidh).
