= Northbridge International School Cambodia =

Private international school in Phnom Penh, Cambodia

Location
- Street 2004; Sangkat Teuk Thla; Phnom Penh, Cambodia, 12102; Cambodia
- Coordinates: 11°33′4.86″N 104°52′25.60″E

Information
- Type: Private school, International school
- Motto: Caring Hearts, Ambitious Minds
- Founded: 1996
- Principal: Frances Morton
- Grades: EL2 - Grade 12
- Age range: 2 to 18
- Accreditation: International Baccalaureate, Western Association of Schools and Colleges, East Asia Regional Council of Overseas Schools
- Website: Northbridge International School Cambodia

Northbridge International School Cambodia (NISC) is a privately owned English-speaking international school, catering for students aged between 2 and 18, located in Teuk Thlar Commune, Sen Sok Section, Phnom Penh, Cambodia.

Founded in 1996, it is one of the largest international schools in the country with over 800 students representing more than 40 nationalities. The faculty is international with teachers representing over 15 nationalities, from Australia to the US, Argentina to Japan. The academic year at Northbridge is divided into two semesters beginning in the middle of August, and the beginning of January, with a total of 180 school days for students and 190 working day for teaching staff. NISC is an International Baccalaureate World School delivering the three IB programs: IB PYP in the Primary School, IB MYP in the Middle School and IB DP in the High School. NISC is accredited by the East Asia Regional Council of Overseas Schools (EARCOS) and the Western Association of Schools and Colleges (WASC).

== History ==
Northbridge International School of Cambodia was founded in 1996 and opened in September 1997 with Mr. David Eaton as its first school head. The school was initially owned by Northbridge Communities Ltd., with its base of operations located in Thailand.

In 2003, French ceased to be the official second language of Cambodia, further encouraging the Cambodian elite to educate their children in English in international schools like Northbridge International School Cambodia. In February 2007 the entire Northbridge project – which included housing community and international school – was purchased by the Cambodian-based Royal Group.

In July 2014 the school became a part of the Nord Anglia Education family of schools which has more than 80 international schools around the world, with Nord Anglia managing and operating Northbridge International School, while Royal Group remains the property owner.

== Campus ==
Northbridge International School Cambodia is set in a spacious 20-acre green campus consisted of modern facilities including the Makerspace for the STEM program (Science, Technology, Engineering, Mathematics), dance studio, science labs, design studio, gym, and large green fields.

In August 2018, NISC celebrated the grand opening of the newly constructed Sports Hall by Nord Anglia Education CEO, Mr Andrew Fitzmaurice, while the 25 metre-long, eight lane main swimming pool built to FINA specifications opened in 2021.

Northbridge is located in the west of the city, and is in close proximity to the former Phnom Penh International Airport.
