= Khan Tuol Kouk =

Tuol Kouk ទួលគោក
- Section
- Location of Tuol Kouk within Phnom Penh
- Coordinates: 11°35′3.84″N 104°54′13.86″E
- Country: Cambodia
- Province: Phnom Penh

Area
  - Total: 7.99 km^{2} (3.08 sq mi)

Population (2019)
  - Total: ▼145,570
- Time zone: UTC+07:00 (ICT)
- Postal code: 12150

Tuol Kouk (often abbreviated as TK; Khmer: ទួលគោក [tuəl koːk]; meaning "Dry Hill") is a section (khan) in Phnom Penh, Cambodia. Tuol Kouk is well known for the large villas in its northern part of the district and is where most Cambodian elites reside. This district is subdivided into 10 sangkats and 143 villages. The district has an area of 7.99 km^{2}. After boundary changes, its population has decreased to 145,570.

Tuol Kouk contains a mixture of villas, small wooden houses, commercial warehouses and NGO offices (including Live and Learn Environmental Education). The Toul Kouk intersection at street 289 and Confederation de la Russie is the primary entrance to Tuol Kouk and marks the eastern extreme of the Royal University of Phnom Penh main campus. The ministries of Defense, Rural Development, Women's Affairs, and a variety of commercial enterprises are located along the main roads of the district.

No.	Sangkat	Postal code
1	Boeng Kak I	12151
2	Boeng Kak II	12152
3	Phsar Depo I	12153
4	Phsar Depo II	12154
5	Phsar Depo III	12155
6	Tuek L'ak I	12156
7	Tuek L'ak II	12157
8	Tuek L'ak III	12158
9	Phsar Daeumkor	12159
10	Boeng Salang	12160

== Education ==
Home of English International School has a Toul Kork Branch in Sen Sok Section.

The Canadian International School of Phnom Penh previously had a Tuol Kork preschool campus, which opened in 2016. This campus was in the Sunway Tuol Kork.
