= Tuek Thla, Phnom Penh =

Tuek Thla ទឹកថ្លា
- Quarter
- Location within Cambodia
- Country: Cambodia
- Province: Phnom Penh
- Section: Sen Sok
- Time zone: UTC+07:00 (ITC)
- Postal code: 120802

Tuek Thla (Khmer: ទឹកថ្លា [tɨk tʰlaː]) is a quarter (sangkat) of Khan Sen Sok (previously part of Khan Russey Keo) in Phnom Penh, Cambodia. The Salesian Sisters of Don Bosco has been running a Don Bosco Vocation Training Centre for Girls at Tuek Thla, Phnom Penh since 1983.

No.	Village
1	Borey Muoy Roy Khnang
2	Ou Baek K'am
3	East Chong Thnal
4	Phsar Tuek Thla
5	Sepese
6	Sleng Roleung
7	Trapeang Chhuk
8	Tuek Thla
9	West Chong Thnal
