= Khan Sen Sok =

Sen Sok ខណ្ឌសែនសុខ
- District (Khan)
- Location of Sen Sok within Phnom Penh

- Location within Cambodia
- Coordinates: 11°36′46″N 104°51′39″E
- Country: Cambodia
- Province: Phnom Penh

Area
  - Total: 53.8 km^{2} (20.8 sq mi)

Population (2019)
  - Total: ▲182,903
- Time zone: UTC+7 (ICT)
- Geocode: 1208

Sen Sok (Khmer: សែនសុខ) is an administrative district (khan) of Phnom Penh, Cambodia. It contains the Sen Sok International University Hospital.

== Administration ==
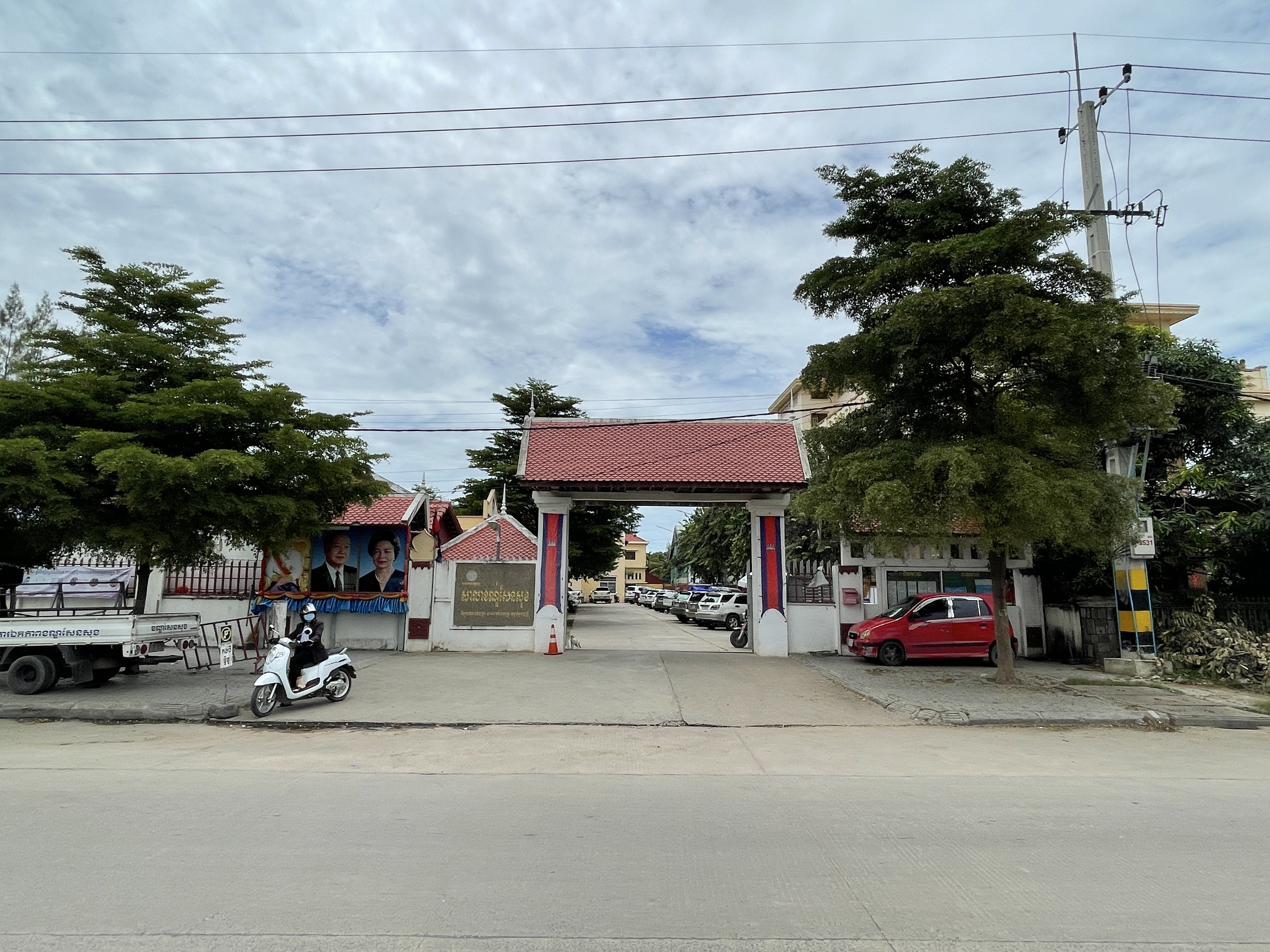
Sen Sok District Hall

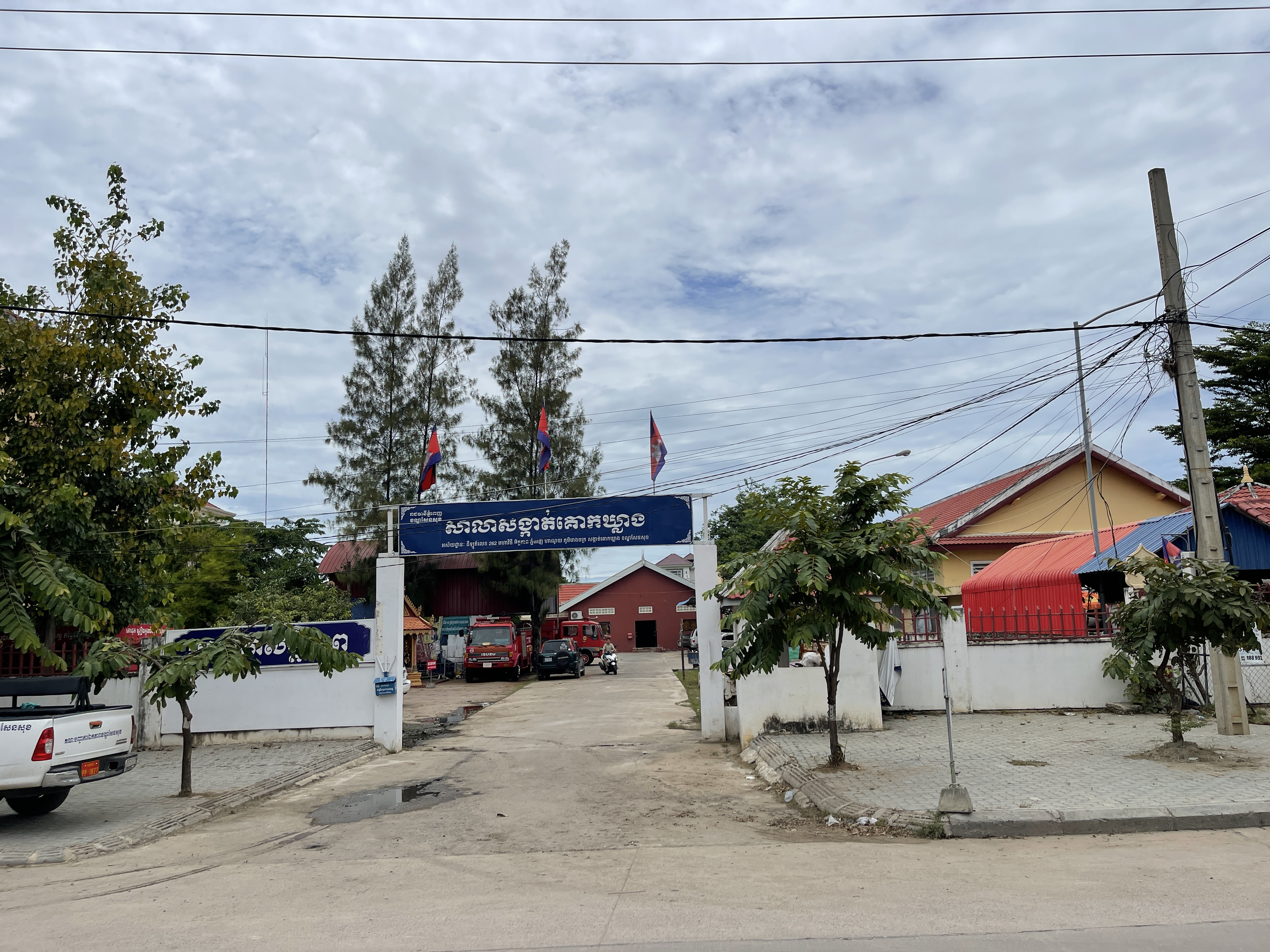
Kouk Khleang Commune Hall in Khan Sen Sok

Khan Sen Sok was established in 2008–2009 by taking three Sangkats—Khmuonh, Phnom Penh Thmei and Tuek Thla—from Khan Russey Keo. The population recorded in the resulting area by the 2008 census was 120,579.

In 2010 Ponhea Pon, Prek Pnov and Samraong communes were added to the Khan from Ponhea Lueu District, Kandal Province. In 2013, the latter three Sangkats formed a part of a new entity, Khan Prek Pnov, while Sangkat Krang Thnong, previously belonging to Khan Pou Senchey, was added to Sen Sok. In 2016, two new Sangkats were established by separating areas from existing subdivisions—Ou Baek K'am from Tuek Thla and Kouk Khleang from Phnom Penh Thmei.

As of 2020, Sen Sok is subdivided into six Sangkats (communes) and 47 Phums (villages).

| Geocode | Sangkat (commune) | Phums (villages) |
|---|---|---|
| 120801 | Phnom Penh Thmei | Poung Peay, Bayab, Phnom Penh Thmei, Tumnob, Tumnob 1, Ouknha Veang |
| 120802 | Tuek Thla | Phsar Tuek Thla, Se Pe Se, Bourei Muoy Roy Khnang, Chong Thnal Khang Kaeut, Chong Thnal Khang Lech, Tuek Thla, Borey Kamakar |
| 120803 | Khmuonh | Khmuonh, Banla S'et, Samraong, Anlong Kngan, Trapeang Reang, Saen Sokh Ti Muoy, Saen Sokh Ti Pir, Saen Sokh Ti Bei, Saen Sokh Ti Buon, Seaen Sokh Ti Pram, Saen Sokh Ti Prammuoy, Saen Sokh Ti Prampir, Trapeang Reang Thmei |
| 120807 | Krang Thnong | Krang Angkrang, Trapeang Mean, Cheang Tong, Trapeang Cheung Srok, Prey Khla, Samraong Teav, Prey Mul, Vimean Trong |
| 120808 | Ou Baek K'am | Ou Baek K'am, Trapeang Chhuk, Orchide, Slaeng Roleung, Trong Moan |
| 120809 | Kouk Khleang | Roung Chakr, Roung Chakr 1, Krong Thmey, Trapeang Svay, Dei Thmei, Damnak, Kouk Khleang, Chres |

== Buddhist temples ==
List of Buddhist pagodas, wats, and temples in Khan Sen Sok

- Wat Sovann Mony Sakor (Wat Samrong Andeth)
- Wat Botum Veary (Wat Khmuonh)
- Wat Tuek Thla
- Wat Kraing Thnong
- Wat Sovann Monyvong (Wat Anlong Kngan)
- Wat Sen Sok
- Wat Preah Barmey VongKut Borey
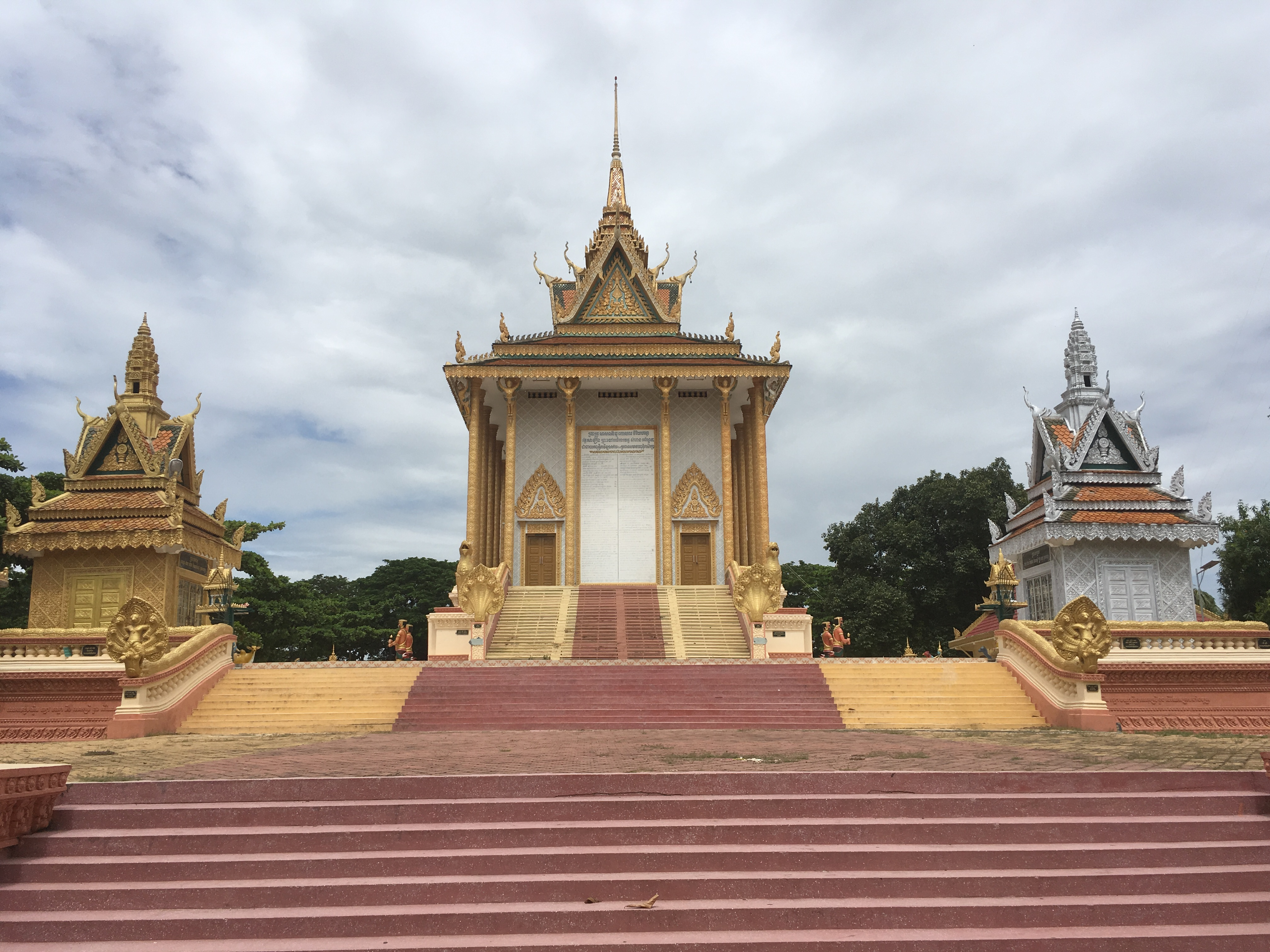
Wat Samrong Andeth

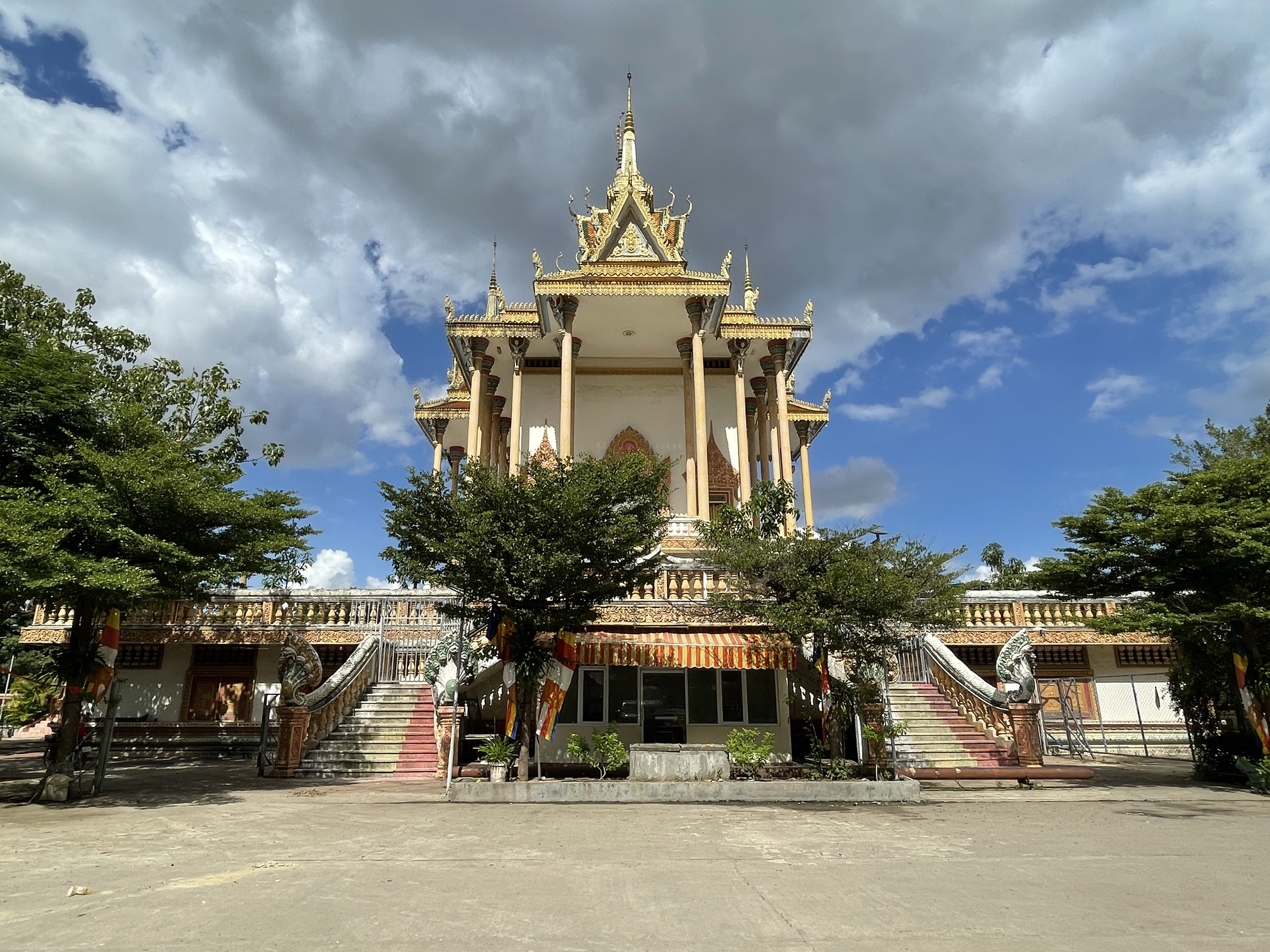
Wat Teuk Thla

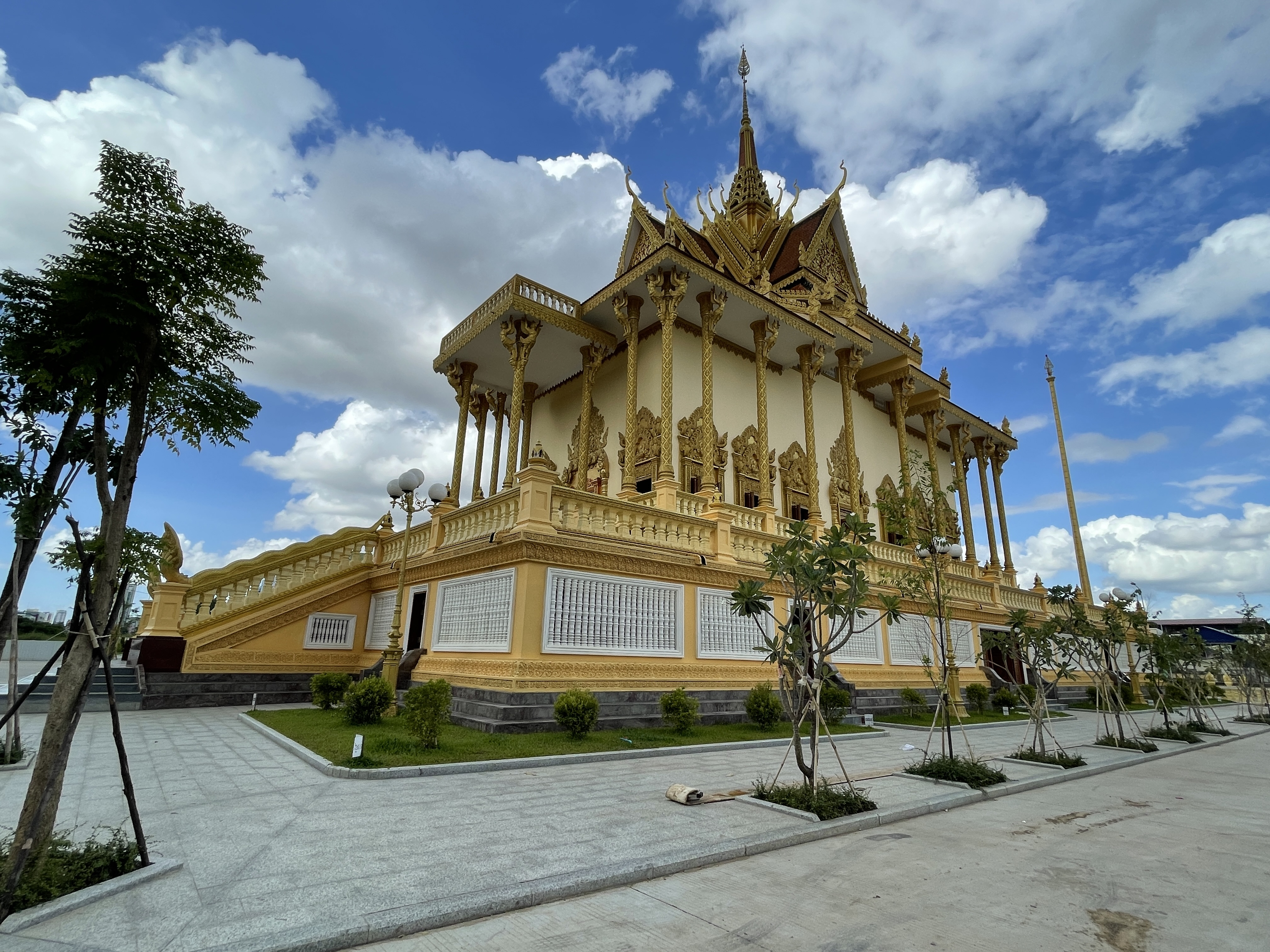
Wat Preah Barmey VongKut Borey

== Education ==
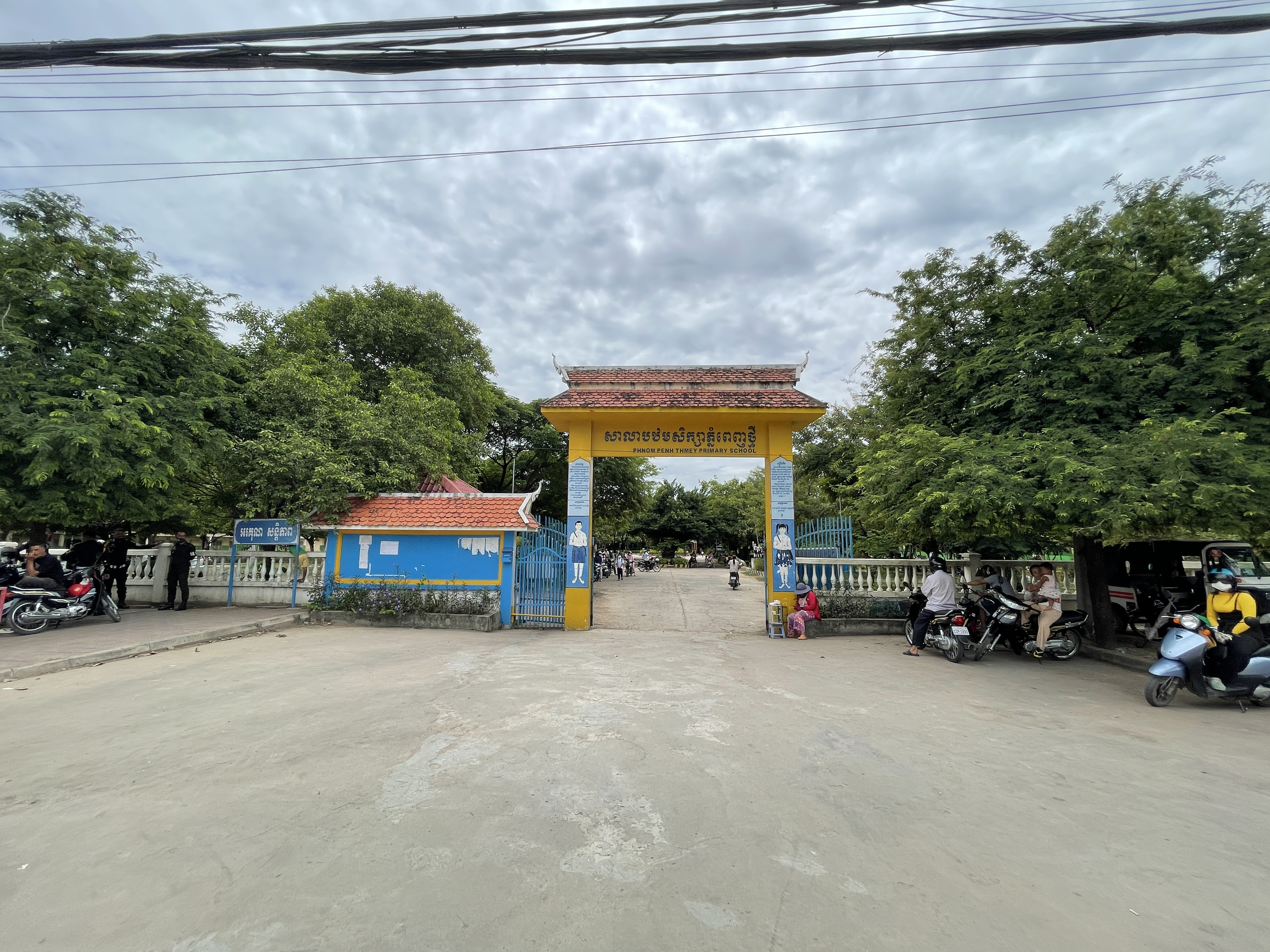
Phnom Penh Thmey Primary School in Phnom Penh Thmey, Khan Sen Sok

Northbridge International School Cambodia is in Teuk Thlar Commune, Sen Sok Section.

Home of English International School has a Toul Kork Branch in Sen Sok Section.

The Japanese School of Phnom Penh, a full-time Japanese school, is in Sangkat Toek Thla in Sen Sok. It was established in 2015.

The Japanese Supplementary School of Phnom Penh (プノンペン補習授業校 Punonpen Hoshū Jugyō Kō), formerly known in English as the Phnom Penh Japanese School, is a part-time Japanese school, in Sangkat Toek Thla in Sen Sok. It is operated by the Japanese Association of Cambodia (JACAM;カンボジア日本人会 Kambojia Nihonjin-kai), and was established in 2002. It had 60 students in June 2011.

== Landmarks ==
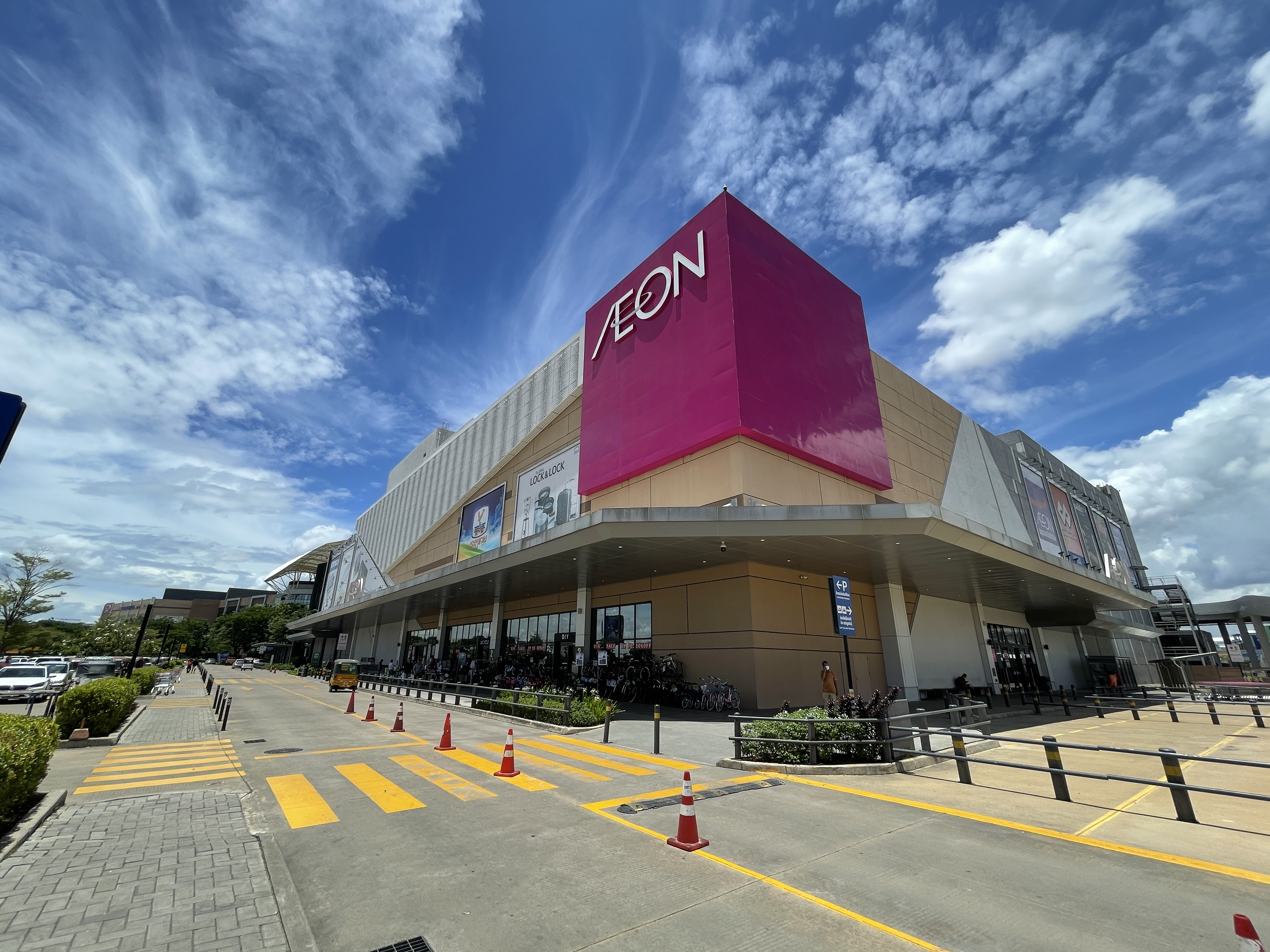
AEON Mall Sen Sok City

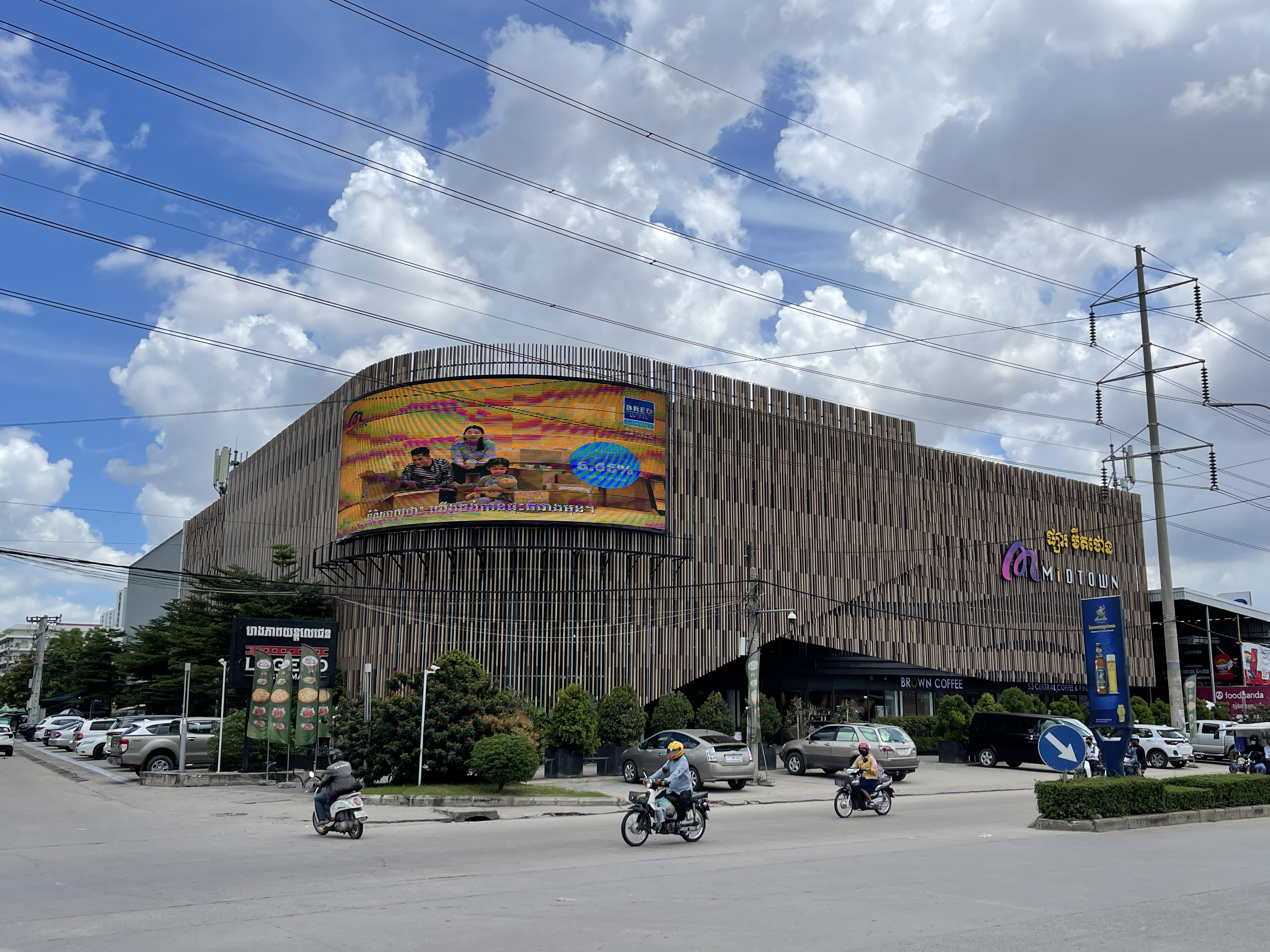
Midtown Community Mall in Sen Sok

Royal Phnom Penh Hospital
