= Cambodian League for the Promotion and Defense of Human Rights =

- Founded: September 1992
- Type: Non-governmental organization
- Purpose: Human rights
- Location: Phnom Penh, Cambodia
- Key people: Dr. Kek Galabru, founder and president
- Employees: 125 (as of December 2012)
- Website: www.licadho-cambodia.org

The Cambodian League for the Promotion and Defense of Human Rights (Khmer: សម្ព័ន្ធខ្មែរជំរឿន និងការពារសិទ្ធិមនុស្ស, romanized: sampnth khmer chomruen ning karpar setthimnous; French: Ligue cambodgienne de défense des droits de l'homme), commonly known by its French acronym LICADHO (/liːˈkɑːdoʊ/; Khmer: លីកាដូ [liːkaːɗoː]; French: [likado]), is a national Cambodian human rights non-governmental organization (NGO) established in 1992. It is based in Phnom Penh and also operates 12 provincial offices. LICADHO's activities focus on monitoring human rights violations, providing legal representation to victims of human rights abuses and providing humanitarian assistance to victims of human rights abuses. The organization also monitors 18 Cambodian prisons and has specialized programs for the protection of women's rights and children's rights. LICADHO is regularly cited in the Cambodian media for stories on local human rights issues. The organization has also received international coverage for its work to combat human trafficking and prisons, and has been particularly vocal in highlighting Cambodia's land-grabbing crisis since 2003. Current LICADHO director Naly Pilorge has authored a number of op-eds in major international media outlets publicizing the human rights situation in Cambodia. LICADHO was the sole Cambodian rights organization invited to testify at a 2013 US House of Representatives subcommittee hearing on Cambodia's "looming political and social crisis".

== History ==
In 1987–88, Dr. Kek Galabru (also known as Dr. Pung Chhiv Kek), a Cambodian living abroad, helped arrange negotiations between Prime Minister Hun Sen and then-deposed King Norodom Sihanouk. The negotiations eventually led to the signing of the Paris Peace Accords in 1991, which mandated a United Nations mission to Cambodia to supervise elections and resolve the long-standing conflict. Following the peace agreements, Galabru returned to Cambodia and founded LICADHO in 1992. LICADHO was one of the first human rights organizations established in Cambodia. The former regime Khmer Rouge did not allow independent national NGOs. LICADHO's first work involved conducting voter education campaigns for the 1993 elections and monitoring the pre-election environment. It later began to address serious human rights abuses occurring in the country, with initial activities focused on monitoring rights violations, providing human rights training, and providing medical care to prisoners and victims of human rights violations.

In 2005, Galabru was nominated for the Nobel Peace Prize as part of the 1,000 Women for the Nobel Peace Prize project.

In the run-up to the 2018 Cambodian general election, LICADHO was the target of two hacking campaigns, one linked to the Vietnamese state, the other to the Chinese.

== Organization and work ==
LICADHO currently pursues its activities through two programs, Monitoring and Protection and Promotion and Advocacy. The organization employed over 125 staff nationwide at the end of 2012. Dr. Pung Chhiv Kek is the current president of LICADHO. Naly Pilorge is the director.

According to LICADHO's website, the organization's Monitoring and Protection Program's activities include:

- Monitoring of state violations and women's and children's rights
- Paralegal and legal representation
- Prison monitoring
- Medical assistance
- Social work

The Promotion and Advocacy Program's activities include:

- Supporting unions and grassroots groups and networks
- Training and information
- Public advocacy and outreach

== International partnerships and memberships ==
LICADHO is one of two Cambodian members of the International Federation for Human Rights (FIDH), the other being Cambodian Human Rights and Development Association (ADHOC). LICADHO is also a member of Forum-Asia, a regional network of human rights organizations, and is a campaign partner of WITNESS. Since 1994, the McGill University Faculty of Law, in Montreal, Canada, has sent students to work at LICADHO as part of its International Human Rights Internship Program.
