= Camko City =

Urban development project in Phnom Penh, Cambodia

Camko City (Khmer: កាំកូស៊ីធី) is a $2 billion urban development project in suburban Phnom Penh, Cambodia. Camko City means Cambodia and Korea City. It is constructed by World City Co., Ltd. with Hanil Construction help; the project is divided into six phases. Camko City is designed to provide office space for global businesses. The city is a special economic zone, with incentives to attract business. In addition to commercial space, Camko City will include houses, apartments, leisure facilities, an international school, and a hospital.

The Cambodia stock exchange was originally to be located in Camko City; however, after delays in construction the headquarters were moved to Canadia Tower.

== Location ==
Camko City is located in Sangkat Tuol Sangkae II, Khan Russey Keo, Phnom Penh, about 3 km (1.9 mi) north of the center of Phnom Penh. It is approved as a development zone for a new satellite city in February 2003 by the Bureau of Urban Planning of the Municipality of Phnom Penh.

The first phase of the project began December 2005 and is expected to be completed in 2018. It will consist of the construction of villas, townhouses and high-rise residential condominiums. When built, the Phase I will have some 1,000 units. As of 2009, more than half of the condominiums are sold while the townhouses and villas are sold out, although construction has just begun with piling materials.

== Infrastructure ==
It includes four- to six-lane paved roads, water supply & sewage system, stable electrical system, high speed information and telecommunication lines and systems, electronic security systems and sustainable environmental systems. Constructions of new residential units are being imposed along with new infrastructure such as skyscrapers.

The cost of condominiums range from $150,000 - $300,000, and are advertised for rent at $600 - $800 per month. The cost of landed properties range from $200,000 - $500,000. Landed properties are mostly bought by wealthy government officials and business people.

== Companies Involved ==
- Shinhan Bank (financial support)
- Busan Sangho Bank (financial support)
- Hanil Construction (construction)
- Korea Power Engineering Company (construction management)
- Yoshin (infrastructure planning)
- K2A (Urban design and architecture)
