= Chbab Srey =

Cambodian code of conduct for women

Chbab Srey (Khmer: ច្បាប់ស្រី, Chbăb Srei [cɓap srəj]; lit. 'Female law') is a Cambodian code of conduct for women. Written in the form of a poem, it is a pendant to Chbab Pros (Khmer: ច្បាប់ប្រុស, Chbăb Brŏs [cɓap proh]; lit. 'Male law') which applies to men. Chbab Srey details a mother's advice to her recently married daughter. The mother, as narrator, advises her daughter to maintain peace within the home, walk and talk softly, and obey and respect her husband. It has been at the center of debate and controversy in recent years in Cambodia.

== History ==
=== Origin: an ancestral vision of the woman ===
The Chbab Srey is a poem that was orally passed down from the 14th to 19th centuries, before it was codified in written form.

=== A classical piece of Khmer literature attributed to King Ang Duong ===
The Chbab Srey was composed as a poem by King Ang Duong in 1837. Authorship however has been contested by Judy Ledgerwood who attributes it instead to Minh Mai, who penned the best known manuscripts of the Chbab Srey. The narrative takes the form of Queen Vimala instructing her daughter Indrandati before she leaves her parents' kingdom. According to researcher Trudy Jacobsen, this writing may have been a misogynistic response by King Ang Duong to the crowning of Ang Mey in Vietnam.

King Ang Duong is also said to have been influenced by the more conservative strain of Buddhism that became known as the Dhammayuttika Nikaya sect coming from Thailand. It quickly became a classical piece of Khmer literature taught in schools until modern times.

=== A vision of women still common but no longer accepted ===
In the early 1960s, a certain women's liberation movement emerged, as can be seen from the movies of Sihanouk, but hardly made it beyond privileged circles. During the Khmer Rouge regime, the Chbab Srey was set aside only to be replaced by more horrible atrocities including wide-scale rape, mass weddings and forced pregnancies. After the fall of the Communist regime, Cambodia ratified the Convention on the Elimination of All forms of Discrimination against Women (CEADW) in 1992.

The committee in charge of monitoring the progress of the country (Committee on the elimination of Discrimination against Women) expressed its concern in its observation in 2013 that " the Chbab Srey, the traditional code of conduct for Women is deeply rooted in Cambodian culture and society and continues to define everyday life on the basis of stereotypical roles of women and men in the family and in society".

The Chbab Srey was taken out of the mandatory curriculum in public schools by the Ministry of Education and the Ministry of Women Affairs in 2007. However, as of 2015, a shorter version of it was still being taught to Khmer literature students from grade 7 to 9. These include rules such as "Happiness in the family comes from a woman," "A woman's poor character results in others looking down upon her husband," and "Don't go for a walk to somebody's house."

== Issues ==
=== Domestic violence ===
According to the human rights advocate Kek Galabru, there is a widespread and long-lasting subservience and inferiority of women to men that makes the issue of domestic violence in Cambodia a complex issue. The traditional Chbab Srey has taught women in Cambodia to be subservient to men and allowed a marital exemption for rape for generations. For that reason, the Chbab Srey has been accused of encouraging a culture of domestic violence in Cambodia.

=== Empowerment of women ===
More generally, feminist voices have arisen in recent years in Cambodia to question to general vision of women imposed by the Chbab Srey. Beyond the legal dictates, the Chbab Srey "stifles women's ability to pursue their own goals and aspirations in life" according to Khmer activist Kounila Keo.

== See also ==
- Women in Cambodia
