= Women in Cambodia =

General statistics
- Maternal mortality (per 100,000): 250 (2010)
- Women in parliament: 18.1% (2012)
- Women over 25 with secondary education: 11.6% (2010)
- Women in labour force: 79.2% (2011)

Gender Inequality Index
- Value: 0.461 (2021)
- Rank: 116th out of 191

Global Gender Gap Index
- Value: 0.690 (2022)
- Rank: 98th out of 146

Women in Cambodia, due to the influence of the dominant Khmer culture, are traditionally expected to be modest and soft-spoken. They are to be well-mannered, industrious, and hold a sense of belonging to the household. It is expected that they act as the family's caregivers and caretakers, financial administrators, and serve as the "preserver of the home". As financial administrators, women can be identified as having household authority at the familial level. Khmer women are expected to maintain virginity until marriage, become faithful wives, and act as advisors to their husbands. Women in Cambodia have also been known as “light” walkers-- "light" walking and refinement of the Khmer women is further described as being "quiet in […] movements that one cannot hear the sound of their silk skirt rustling".

== History ==
During the old Kingdom of Cambodia, there were few options for a woman leave the social class she was born in but to become a member of the royal harem, to which women were sent as gifts to the king in order to become concubines and other royal attendants until it was closed in 1904.

During the French colonial period, the change in women's position was largely superficial and restricted to the elite. The school system were largely restricted to males and the écoles franco-cambodgiennes and Manufacture Royale au Palais for girls only offered an education to domestics or manufacturer of tourist objects, and only a small minority upper-class women had access to higher education at the Collège Sisowath (Lycée Sisowath) and from there to university abroad, foremost in Saigon.

The organized women's movement in Cambodia started with the foundation of the Cambodian Women's Association in 1949, which supported the expansion of women's rights and opportunities by supporting the moderate state feminism during the late colonial and early independence years of Cambodia, when women where formally granted access to education, professional life, suffrage and appointed to political posts for the first time.

== Work ==
In the wake of the Cambodian Civil War, Cambodia suffered a deficit in male laborers. As a result, the women took on the responsibilities previously done by men. Under Cambodian law, women are entitled to "equal pay for equal work". However, in reality, most women receive lower wages than their male counterparts. During the 1990s, many "uneducated young women" from rural areas ventured into the city to work in garment factories.

In 2004, the organization, Gender and Development for Cambodia, stated that 6% of the female workforce in Cambodia is paid.

== Religion ==
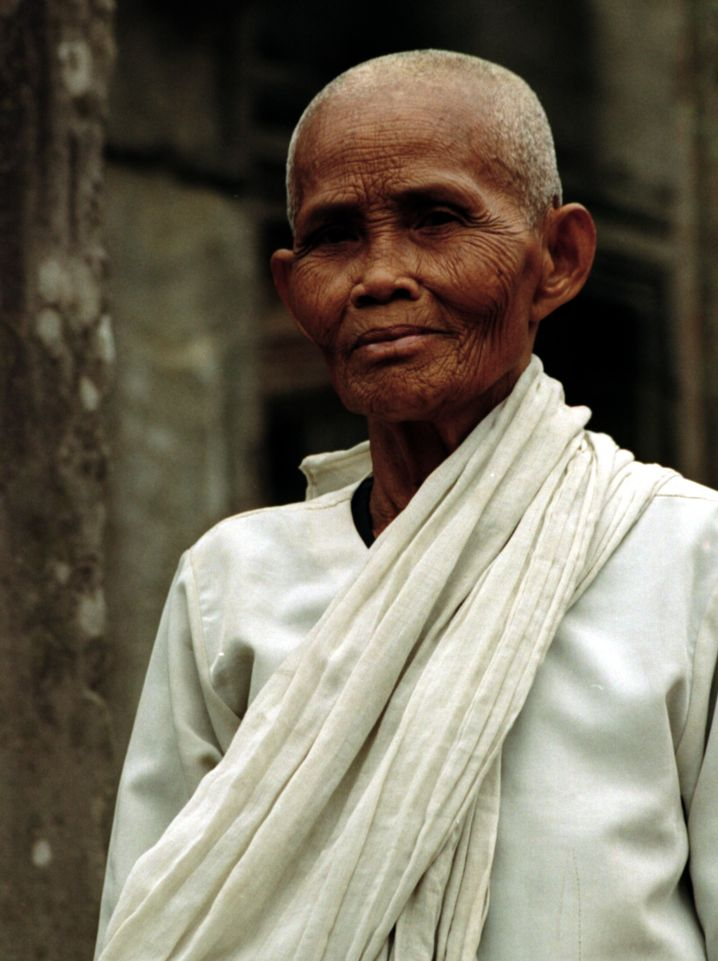
A Buddhist nun in Cambodia

Khmer women are often active in worshipping at Buddhist temples and participating in religious ceremonies—particularly during the thngai sil (Khmer: ថ្ងៃសីល; English for "holy days"). Some women not only participate as worshippers, but become Buddhist nuns (យាយជី yeay chi)-- particularly the widowed and the elderly.

In recent years, Buddhism has also been examined in conjunction with feminist thought to navigate issues of domestic violence that impact women. In Buddhism as in international law, people must intervene when a man has criminally attacked his wife, despite some alluding to a ‘cultural defense’ of the perpetrator. Recent developments have included the idea of monks carrying out preventative work by educating communities on non-violence using the precepts of morality in the dharma, disabusing culprits of their sense of entitlement and impunity.

== Education ==
13.8% of Cambodian women were reported as being illiterate in 2019. In 2004, it was reported that only 16% of the girls in Cambodia were enrolled in lower secondary schools. Girls in Cambodia lack access to education due to gender role expectations and other socio-economic realities. According to a World Bank Report, 63% of girls and 52.5% of boys complete secondary school in Cambodia. Girls in Cambodia are needed at home to take care of younger siblings, perform household duties, and support the head of the home. Other factors include extreme poverty, the distance between home and school, as well as an ever-present fear for personal safety while traveling alone.

However, despite these low statistics, there is a growing number of women present in Cambodia's universities. As of 2004, 20% of university graduates were women.

Funded by Google.org, the philanthropic arm of Google, SHE Investments and Youth Business International (YBI) created an initiative to help underserved female business owners recover from the COVID-19 pandemic. Through this program, women learn about digital literacy, crisis management, financial management, and business model adaption. As of September 2021, 94 out of 97 women graduated and said they would recommend the program to others. In addition, 78 businesses remained operational at the end of the program. Monthly revenue of the participants increased by 169 percent. A total of 584 jobs were either retained, re-hired, or newly created.

== Political status ==
From the 1980s to present day, the number of female participants in Cambodian politics has remained low. They are under-represented in high-level positions at both the local and national levels of the government. A case study in 2013 found that young women in Cambodia generally had one of three perceptions of politics; those aged 14–18 generally did not have opinions or thoughts on politics, or did not know what the word meant. Young women from ages 20–35 who were garment factory workers or had a higher level of education generally thought politics was related to issues such as “law, resources, the national minimum wage, employment, land and services.” Garment factory workers, who are predominantly female and make up the labour force of the country's largest industry, have a history of being involved in politics in Cambodia. Examples include the 2013–2014 Cambodian protests. Women who did not fall into one of these two categories were generally distrustful of “politics,” and associated it with money, corruption, and male domination.

Since 1993, there has been a modest rise in the participation of Cambodian women including leadership in non-governmental organizations focusing on the issues and rights of women. It was reported in 2004 that 10% of National Assembly members, 8% of Commune Council members, and 7% of Cambodian judges were women.

The Cambodian Government has committed to further increasing female representation in politics. The Cambodian Millennium Development Goals (CMDGs) set a target of 25 percent of women's representation at the Commune/Sangkat Council level and 30 percent of female representatives in the National Assembly and Senate by 2015. However, women are often elected to meet the government quota, but are placed in figurehead roles that lack transformative power. Parties will often list female candidates at the bottom of the ballot so that their party technically has female representation, but these candidates are not likely to be elected. The number of women in the National Assembly also decreased after the July 2013 elections, and women were among members of the Cambodia National Rescue Party who were banned from politics or exiled in 2017.

== Legal status ==
Throughout the nation's history and within national legislation, men and women in Cambodia have always had equal rights. This equality is also stated in the Constitution of Cambodia. Cambodian women benefit from inheritance laws. These laws mean that they can own property, "bring property into a marriage", and claim the property as their own if they choose to do so. Women in Cambodia can also easily obtain a divorce. In 2005, Cambodia outlawed marital rape.

== Prostitution ==
Prostitution in Cambodia encompasses local women, women from Vietnam, and is being linked to the sex trade in nearby Thailand. As a result of this widespread prostitution, approximately 2.8% of Cambodia's population are infected with HIV/AIDS.

== Sex trafficking ==
Women and girls in Cambodia are trafficked both domestically and throughout the world. In many cases, they are threatened and forced into prostitution, marriages, and even pregnancies.

== Reproductive Health ==
Cambodia has taken steps to improve reproductive and sexual health, such as introducing the Birth Spacing Policy in 1995 and the Abortion Law in 1997. However, access to contraception remains limited in rural areas. The Ministry of Health has implemented the National Strategy for Reproductive and Sexual Health (2017-2020) to improve the reproductive and sexual health of the population. However, a 2019 investigation by the World Health Organization revealed that only one-third of Cambodian villages had active distributors of contraceptives, such as birth control pills and condoms. According to a report from the World Bank, 160 women die per 100,000 live births due to pregnancy-related causes in Cambodia. The mortality ratio has decreased in recent years from 488 in 2000 to 160 in 2017.

== Domestic violence and Assault ==
Especially in rural communities, Cambodian women are not only susceptible to domestic violence, but also have "little legal recourse". Due to limited education, many Cambodian women are unable to protect themselves from discrimination, gender inequality, violence, and abuse. They live unaware of their legal rights and/or global human rights standards.

In 2004, Gender and Development for Cambodia reported that "23% of women have suffered physical domestic abuse". A 2013 survey found that 32.8% of men reported perpetrating physical and/or sexual violence against an intimate partner, and one in five men reported raping a woman or girl. Government rhetoric often blames alcohol and poverty, but local activists argue this approach is ineffective. Attempts to address gender-based violence have been complicated by the effects of globalization, including economic development resulting in women flocking to the cities in search of work, which activists state has caused more economic abuse and violence. Simultaneously, the heightened awareness due to global women's rights movements has made the movement to counter gender-based violence more widespread in Cambodian society, and the world as a whole.

There are also issues with legislation related to preventing assault. The Cambodian Criminal Code (2010) defines rape restrictively and incompletely, and while marital rape was outlawed in 2005, some Members of Parliament argued that sexual intercourse is an obligation in a marriage. Local activists argue for the transformation of patriarchal norms and an emphasis on championing women's rights without locating gender-based violence in an unchanging culture. They argue that this creates untrue stereotypes of Khmer culture—gender-based violence is rooted in patriarchal norms, and should not be presented as an unchangeable cultural norm. The National Action Plans to Prevent Violence Against Women (2014-2018 and 2019–2023) have tried to combine approaches, including analyzing norms among men and educating people to stop using a "cultural defense" of the perpetrator perpetuated by men. However, patriarchal views on marriage remain prevalent, hampering the implementation of legal protections for women, especially those in rural areas and members of the LGBTQIA+ community.

== Social status ==
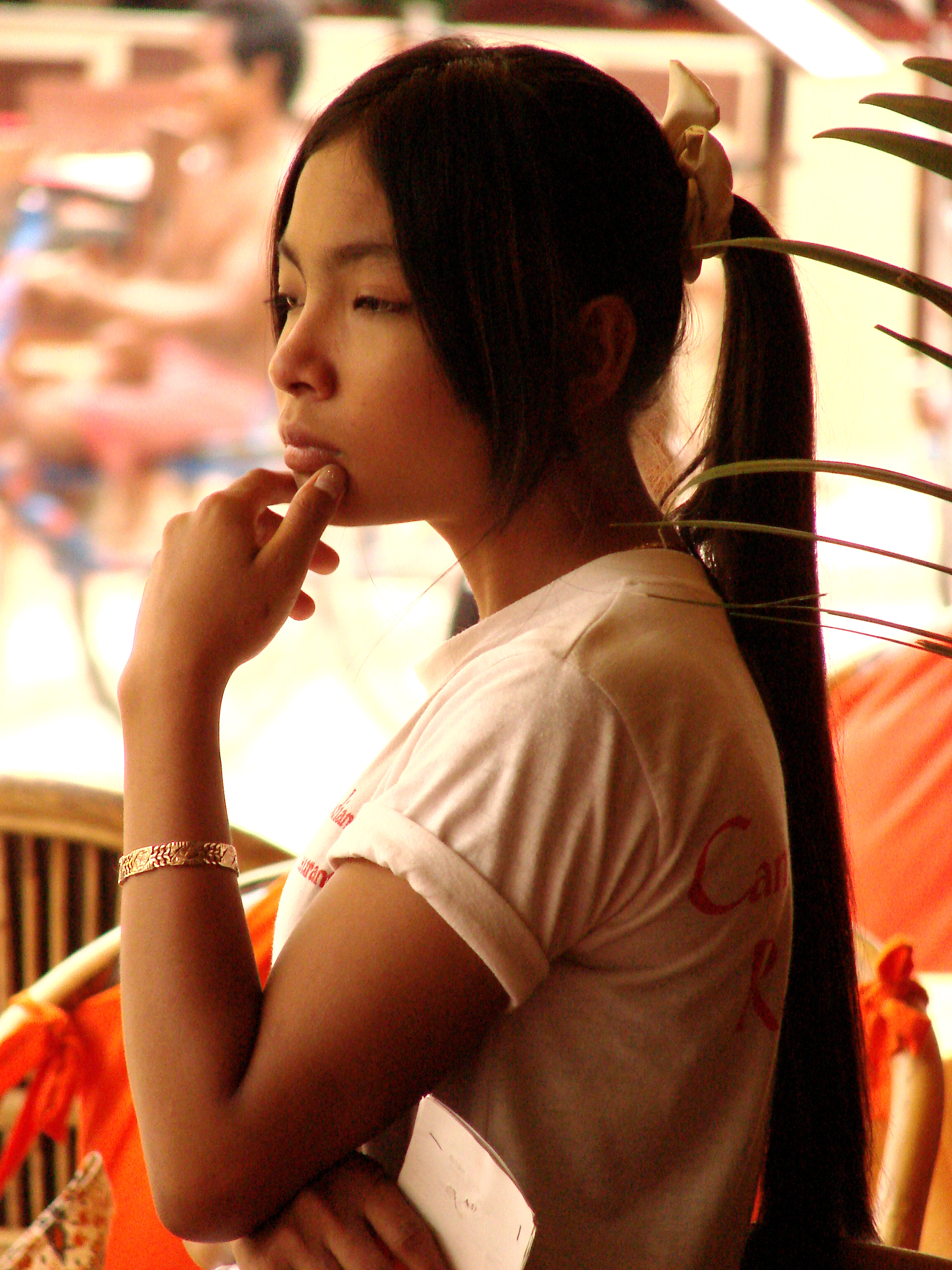
A young Cambodian waitress waiting on customers

Of late, there has been much discussion over the roles of Cambodian women in the society of today. What Cambodian tradition tell us about their daily roles is being revisited. In order to reach gender equity, gender norms need to reflect the present era in regard to leadership roles. Some would say that elevating a woman's worth from the traditional representations of women in Khmer culture and stating that a woman is not second to a man, would help to make Cambodian women their own agents.

In recent years, young women in Cambodia have been influenced by Western ideas which are contrary to traditional Cambodian culture. One example, found particularly in the capital of Phnom Penh, is that young female Cambodians are overtly consuming liquors and other alcoholic beverages in restaurants. Other areas in which Western influence is detected include a sense of equal rights between men and women, peer pressure, companionship, experimentation, trouble within the family, abandonment by a boyfriend, and through advertising.

== See also ==
- Chbab Srey, Khmer code of conduct for women
- Courtship, marriage, and divorce in Cambodia
- Women's Media Centre of Cambodia
- Women in Asia
