= Anti-union violence =

Physical force intended to harm union members

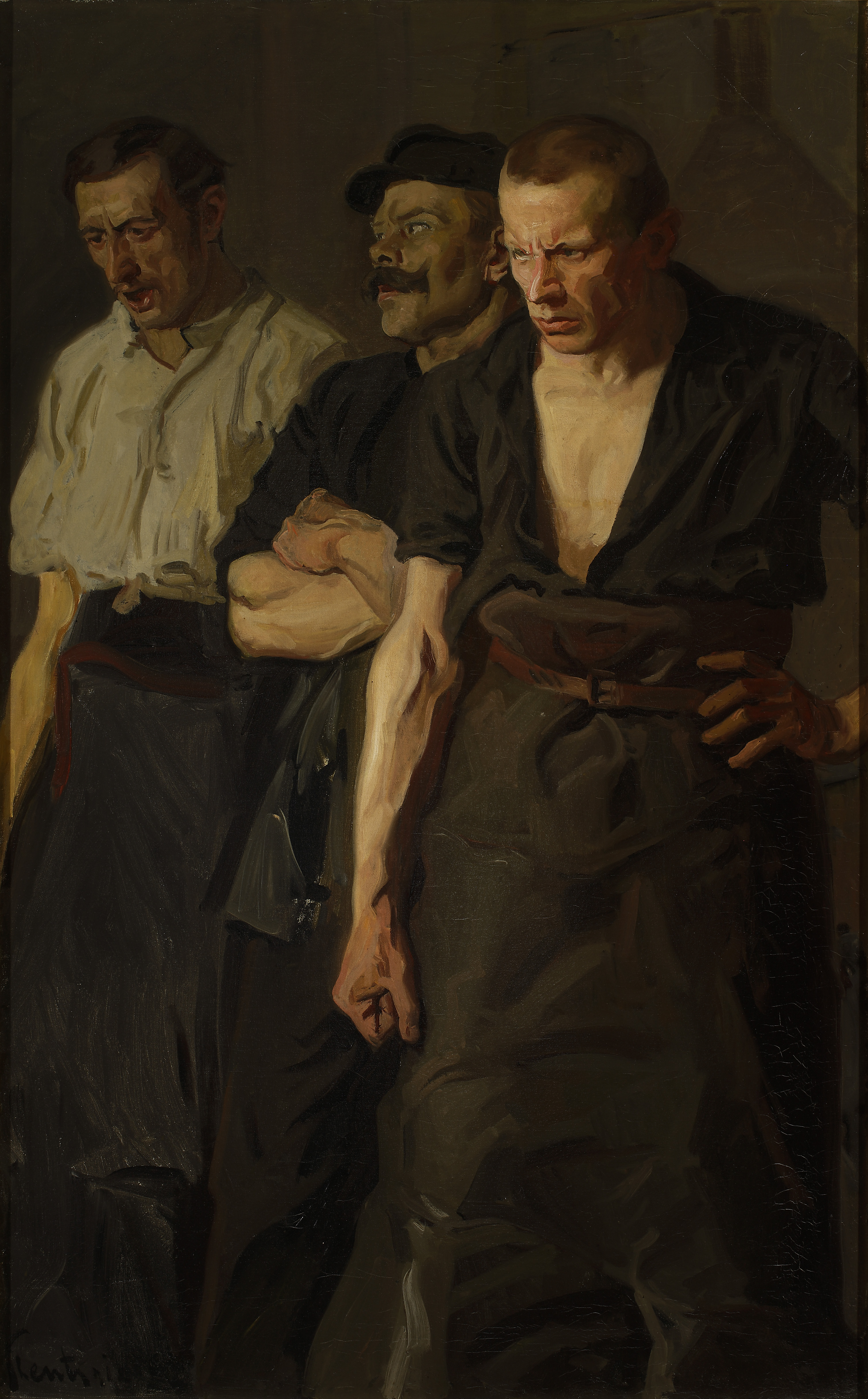
Strike, Stanisław Lentz, 1910

Anti-union violence is physical force intended to harm union officials, union organizers, union members, union sympathizers, or their families. It is most commonly used either during union organizing efforts, or during strikes. The aim most often is to prevent a union from forming, to destroy an existing union, or to reduce the effectiveness of a union or a particular strike action. If strikers prevent people or goods to enter or leave a workplace, violence may be used to allow people and goods to pass the picket line.

Violence against unions may be isolated, or may occur as part of a campaign that includes spying, intimidation, impersonation, disinformation, and sabotage. Violence in labor disputes may be the result of unreasonable polarization, or miscalculation. It may be willful and provoked, or senseless and tragic. On some occasions, violence in labor disputes may be purposeful and calculated, for example the hiring and deployment of goon squads to assault strikers.

Incidents of violence during periods of labor unrest are sometimes perceived differently by different parties. It is sometimes a challenge to ascertain the truth about labor-related violence, and incidents of violence committed by, or in the name of, unions or union workers have occurred as well.

== History ==
The practice of workers organizing, and meeting resistance for organizing, dates to antiquity. The first known individual killed by authorities for labor activities is likely Cinto Brandini, executed with nine others in 1345 Florence for attempting to organize woolcombers.

According to a study in 1969, the United States has had the bloodiest and most violent labor history of any industrial nation in the world. Mass labor violence in the U.S. peaked in the early 20th century and has largely subsided since the 1940s. But the deadly suppression of labor unions on a large scale persists into the new century, in the 2012 Marikana killings in South Africa, in the ongoing assassinations of trade union members in Colombia, and the South Korean government's response to Korean Confederation of Trade Unions protests.

== Causes ==
Since unions are organized to achieve collective bargaining power to begin with, most union conflicts have been motivated primarily by economic issues (wages, working hours, safety conditions, work rules, etc.), and have engaged antagonists (employers, hired strikebreakers, replacement workers, local law enforcement) with economic goals in mind. In some instances, however, other causes emerge.

=== Race ===
French cartoon of the Rand Rebellion in South Africa, 1922

The 1887 Thibodaux massacre in Louisiana, the 1899 Pana riot in southern Illinois, and the 1911 Queen & Crescent killings in Kentucky and Tennessee are three examples of deliberate campaigns of murder against organized black workers in the American south, the first committed by landowners, the other two by white competitors.

In South Africa the 1922 Rand Rebellion also had underlying racial causes, taking on the slogan "Workers of the world, unite and fight for a white South Africa!", before their strike grew to a small-scale rebellion at the cost of 200 lives. The behavior of South African police in the 1946 African Mine Workers' Union strike is said to have led to the formation of the Northern Rhodesian African Mineworkers' Union in 1949 as a cornerstone of the anti-apartheid movement.

=== Political power ===
As with race, for some incidents there is no clear distinction between anti-union violence and political suppression. Polish labor unions were centrally involved in workers' uprisings and/or general strikes that challenged the sitting governments in 1905, 1923, and 1937. In a similar way the strike of Asturian miners in 1934, put down by right-wing Spanish government forces with great loss of life, amounted to an insurrection through work stoppage, not an economic labor action. Unions continued to play a political and military role in the subsequent Spanish Civil War.

Along with Franco in Spain, other totalitarian regimes in Europe brought their labor unions under government control, violently when necessary. After coming to power as chancellor in January 1933, Adolf Hitler declared May Day a national holiday, then on May 2, 1933, unexpectedly moved to outlaw labor unions as part of the Nazi "synchronization" process. Major unions such as the Allgemeiner Deutscher Gewerkschaftsbund were raided that day, their accounts seized, and their leaders (Gustav Schiefer, Wilhelm Leuschner, Erich Luebbe) arrested and sent to concentration camps. (The bodies of four murdered trade union officials in Duisburg were only found a year later, in April 1934.) Every worker in the nation was then compelled to join the single party-controlled union, the German Labour Front. Similar coercive violence was exercised against labor unions in conquered nations, as in the Netherlands in 1941.

== Types of violence ==
Some anti-union violence appears to be random, such as an incident during the 1912 textile strike in Lawrence, Massachusetts, in which a police officer fired into a crowd of strikers, killing Anna LoPizzo.

Anti-union violence may be used as a means to intimidate others, as in the hanging of union organizer Frank Little from a railroad trestle in Butte, Montana. A note was pinned to his body which said, "Others Take Notice! First And Last Warning!" The initial of the last names of seven well-known union activists in the Butte area were on the note, with the "L" for Frank Little circled.

Anti-union violence may be abrupt and unanticipated. Three years after Frank Little was lynched, a strike by Butte miners was suppressed with gunfire when deputized mine guards suddenly fired upon unarmed picketers in the Anaconda Road Massacre. Seventeen were shot in the back as they tried to flee, and one man died.

Other anti-union violence may seem orchestrated, as in 1914 when mine guards and the state militia fired into a tent colony of striking miners in Colorado, an incident that came to be known as the Ludlow Massacre. During that strike, the company hired the Baldwin Felts agency, which built an armored car so their agents could approach the strikers' tent colonies with impunity. The strikers called it the "Death Special". At the Forbes tent colony,

"[The Death Special] opened fire, a protracted spurt that sent some six hundred bullets tearing through the thin tents. One of the shots struck miner Luka Vahernik, fifty, in the head, killing him instantly. Another striker, Marco Zamboni, eighteen ... suffered nine bullet wounds to his legs... One tent was later found to have about 150 bullet holes..."

Sometimes, there is simultaneous violence on both sides. In an auto workers strike organised by Victor Reuther and others in 1937, "[u]nionists assembled rocks, steel hinges, and other objects to throw at the cops, and police organized tear gas attacks and mounted charges."

There have been cases where violence has been perpetrated or encouraged by agents of management, intending it to be blamed on the union.

== Violence by country ==
=== Europe ===
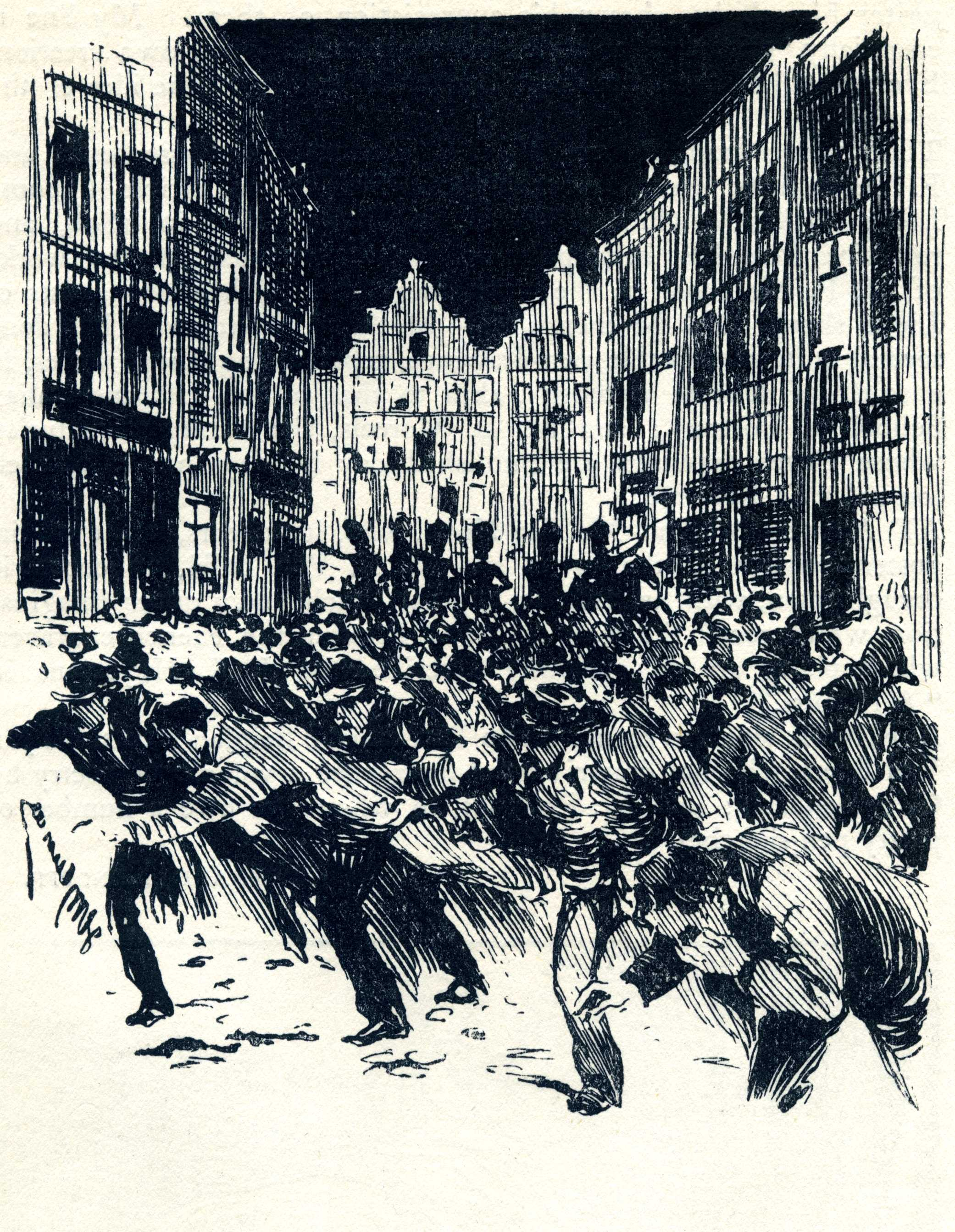
Depiction of the 1902 Belgium general strike, by Henri Meurnier

Belgium

- the Belgian general strike of 1902 was led by the coal miners of Liège, lasting 10 to 20 days and killing about 12

Russia

- in the Lena massacre hundreds of striking goldfield workers were killed by tsarist government forces in northeast Siberia near the Lena River on 17 April [O.S. 4 April] 1912
- The 1962 Novocherkassk Massacre

United Kingdom

- on 17 May 1869, a labor action of Welsh colliers (forcibly delivering the mine's new operator to the police station) developed into The Mold Riot, a confrontation between a mob of 1500 workers and citizens, versus King's Own Royal Regiment. When pelted with stones, the King's Own fired into the crowd, killing four

Spain

Repression and violence against the Spanish labour movement was widespread during various of the 19th and 20th century political regimes:

Spanish Restoration (1876–1931):

- On 4 January 1888, in the Plaza de la Constitución of Minas de Riotinto (Province of Huelva, Andalusia) around 200 people were shot dead by two companies of the Spanish Army when they protested for better wages and the end of the emission of toxic fumes in the mines. Protestors were mainly workers of the local mines, led by anarchist Maximiliano Tornet. The massacre lasted only 15 minutes and the bodies of the dead were probably buried under the slag of some mine in the region.
- On 31 May 1901 the Guardia Civil shot striking workers in the city of A Coruña, killing 8.
- On 7 March 1916 Guardia Civil and a unit of the Spanish Army opened fire at a crowd of striking workers in La Unión, killing 7 and injuring 16.

Second Spanish Republic (1931–1936):

- On 5 January 1932 a group of workers, organized by the socialist union UGT, strike in a shoe factory in the Riojan town of Arnedo. Guardia Civil broke the strike and killed 11 workers during a protest, part of the strike, in the local Plaza de la República.

Spanish Civil War and Early Francoism (1936–1963):

- A brutal campaign of repression against union members was unleashed during the White Terror (known in Spain as Represión franquista). A large portion of the 150,000-400,000 deathly victims of the terror were members of the two main unions at the time: UGT and CNT. Both organizations were almost destroyed by this mass campaign of repression.

Late Francoism (1963–1975):

- 3 workers were killed by the Armed Police during a construction strike in the city of Granada.
- The 10 of March 1972 2 workers (Amador Rey and Daniel Niebla, members of the clandestine union CCOO) were killed by the Armed Police in the city of Ferrol. Another 16 were injured by bullets, 160 workers were fired, 101 arrested, 60 incarcerated and 54 fined with between 50,000 and 250,000 pesetas. 10 March is officially commemorated in Galicia as Day of the Galician Working Class.

Spanish Transition (1975–1983):

- in the Vitoria massacre 5 striking workers were killed by the Armed police, and another two people were killed in the protests against police violence after the incident, one in Tarragona and another in Basauri.

Sweden

- in the Ådalen shootings of May 1931, Swedish military forces opened fire against labour demonstrators in the Swedish sawmill district of Ådalen, killing five people, including a young woman

=== North America ===
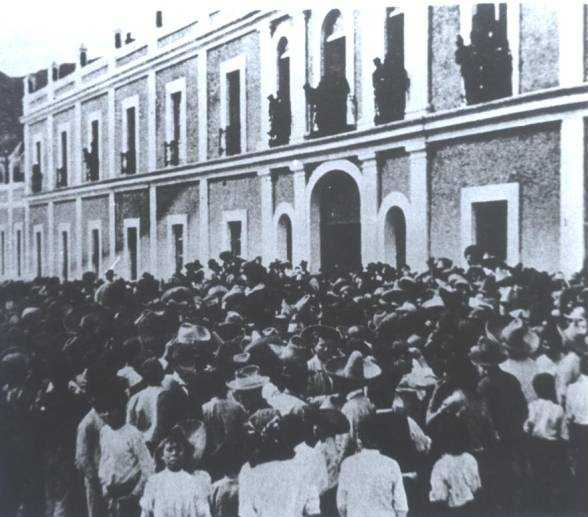
Río Blanco strike, 1907

United States

Historically, violence against unions in the United States has included attacks by detective and guard agencies, such as the Pinkertons, Baldwin Felts, Burns, or Thiel detective agencies; citizens groups, such as the Citizens' Alliance; company guards; police; national guard; or even the active duty military. In the book From Blackjacks To Briefcases, Robert Michael Smith states that during the late nineteenth and early twentieth centuries, anti-union agencies "spawned violence and wreaked havoc" on the labor movement. According to Morris Friedman, detective agencies were themselves for-profit companies, and a "bitter struggle" between capital and labor could be counted upon to create "satisfaction and immense profit" for agencies such as the Pinkerton company. Harry Wellington Laidler wrote a book in 1913 detailing how one of the largest union busters in the United States, Corporations Auxiliary Company, had a sales pitch offering the use of provocation and violence.

During the Lattimer massacre, nineteen unarmed immigrant coal miners were suddenly gunned down at the Lattimer mine near Hazleton, Pennsylvania, on September 10, 1897. In the Colorado Labor Wars, martial law was imposed by the Colorado National Guard in order to put down striking miners. A study of industrial violence in 1969 concluded, "There is no episode in American labor history in which violence was as systematically used by employers as in the Colorado labor war of 1903 and 1904." In 1914, mine guards and the state militia fired into a tent colony of striking miners in Colorado, an incident that came to be known as the Ludlow Massacre. During that strike, the company hired the Baldwin Felts agency, which built an armored car so their agents could approach the strikers' tent colonies with impunity. The strikers called it the "Death Special". In 1917, union organizer Frank Little was hanged from a railroad trestle in Butte, Montana, with a note pinned to his body which carried a "warning" to other labor activists. In 1927, during another coal strike in Colorado, state police and mine guards fired pistols, rifles and a machine gun into a group of five hundred striking miners and their wives in what came to be called the Columbine Mine Massacre.

By the early 1900s, public tolerance for violence during labor disputes began to decrease. Yet violence involving strikebreaking troops and armed guards continued into the 1930s. Legislation related to employer strategies such as violent strike breaking would have to wait until after World War II. Beginning in the 1950s, employers began to embrace new methods of managing workers and unions which were still effective, but much more subtle.

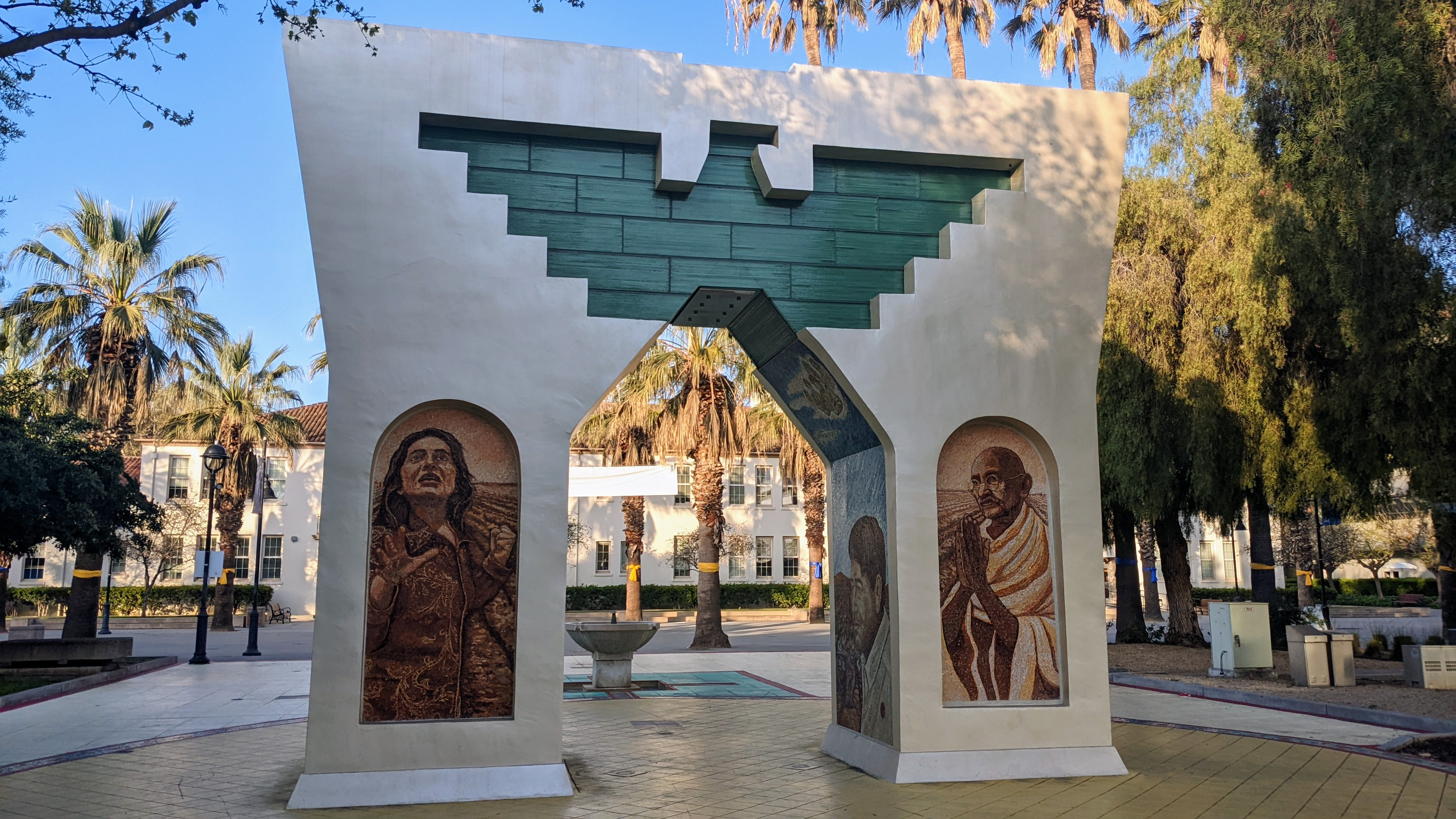
United Farm Workers of America

During the 1960s, unfair working conditions presented themselves inside the agriculture industry. Because of this an American labor leader named Cesar Chavez formed the organization United Farm Workers. This organization was founded to fight for rights of Farmworkers in the United States. It helped push for better wages and working conditions and to unionize farm workers. During this time they went on strikes and boycotted different farming companies such as Schenley Industries and the DiGiorgio Corporation. These strikes helped gain labor contracts with an increase in wages and improved working conditions. These strikes later lead to the death of two individuals named Nagi Daifallah and Juan de la Cruz. These men were filled by the County Sheriffs for protesting at the California grape strike.

Canada

With fatalities as one indication of anti-union brutality, a union pamphlet published in 2006 detailed 24 "Canadian Labour Martyrs" that were killed since 1903. This list includes Joseph Mairs of the Vancouver Island War of 1912–1914, coal miner Albert Goodwin killed in 1918, miner Bill Davis of Nova Scotia (namesake of the William Davis Miners' Memorial Day), and the 1929 suspected murders of Rosvall and Voutilainen in Thunder Bay, Ontario. After Rosvall and Voutilainen were murdered for their pro-union efforts, authorities in Thunder Bay conducted a cover up in an attempt to conceal the truth. Thunder Bay remains a hotbed of anti-union violence against pro-union individuals. Thunder Bay has been labelled the Capital of Anti-union Violence of Canada.

Mexico

- the Cananea strike of organized mine workers in June 1906, and the Río Blanco strike of unionized textile workers in January 1907, became two linked symbols of the corruption and civil repression of the administration of Mexican president Porfirio Díaz. They became "household words for hundreds of thousands of Mexicans".

=== Central and South America ===
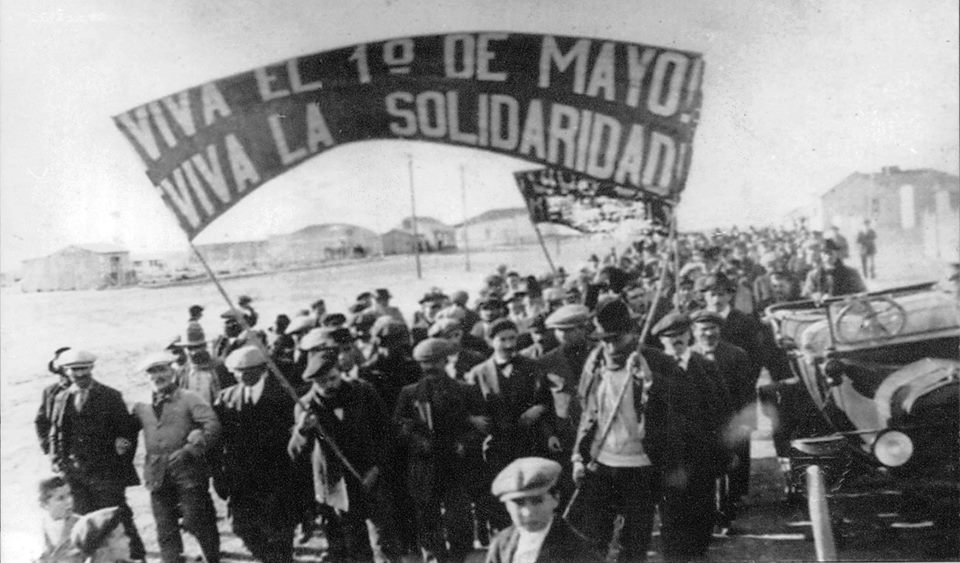
Argentine rural workers striking in Santa Cruz Province (1921)

Argentina

- Between 800 and 1356 workers were killed in the Tragic Week in Buenos Aires in 1919. The workers were striking for better working conditions in a metallurgic company.
- Approximately 1,500 striking rural workers were shot and killed by the Argentine Army in the Patagonia Uprising between 1920 and 1922.

Bolivia

- government forces killed at least 19 striking mine workers in the Catavi Massacre of December 1942; the workers themselves counted 400 dead
- popular protests against the November 1, 1979 coup d'état of Alberto Natusch Busch, protests led by the Central Obrera Boliviana (COB) trade union confederation, were met with violence from the military. Perhaps 100 were killed, but the new government was overthrown within two weeks.

Chile

- the Santa María School massacre was a massacre of striking nitrate miners, with wives and children, committed by the Chilean Army in Iquique, Chile on December 21, 1907. The number of victims has been estimated at 2,000

Colombia
see main article Trade unions in Colombia

- Colombia has been identified as one of the most hazardous for present-day labor unionists. According to the International Trade Union Confederation, over 2800 unionists were killed between 1986 and April 2010.
- The Banana massacre, 1929
- Isidro Gil, a leader of the National Union of Food Industry Workers at the Bogotá, Colombia bottling plant of the Coca-Cola company who was shot dead at the plant on December 5, 1996. Four other leaders of the union have been killed since 1994, as have other union leaders in Colombia.

El Salvador

- Estimates of the number of labor union members killed in the four first years of the Salvadoran Civil War (1979–1983) range from 3,000 to 8,000. The 2004 murder of a visiting Teamsters organizer from New Jersey brought international attention to the country's "long record of hostility to union labor".

Venezuela

- As of 2010, some 75 union organizers and union members had been killed in the prior two years, according to figures compiled by the Catholic Church. New unions flourishing under the Chavez administration challenged established unions for lucrative memberships. One common tactic was public assassination.

=== Africa ===
South Africa

- the 1922 Rand Rebellion expanded from a strike into a small-scale rebellion at the cost of 200 lives, and the events of the 1946 African Mine Workers' Union strike indirectly led to the development of the anti-apartheid movement.
- The 2012 Marikana Massacre

=== Asia ===
Cambodia

- Chea Vichea, leader of the Free Trade Union of Workers of the Kingdom of Cambodia (FTUWKC), was shot in the head and chest while reading a newspaper at a kiosk in Phnom Penh on January 22, 2004. He had been dismissed by the INSM Garment Factory (located in the Chum Chao District of Phnom Penh), as a reprisal for helping to establish a trade union at the company.

India

- Shankar Guha Niyogi, a leader of the Mukti Morcha union movement in the Indian state of Chhattisgarh, was killed in Bhilai, on September 27, 1991, allegedly by a hired assassin, in the middle of a major dispute about the regularisation of workers' contracts in the steel and engineering industries. The alleged assassin and two industrialists were convicted of his murder but released on appeal; their release is itself now subject to appeal.

Philippines

Labor unions were heavily repressed during Ferdinand Marcos' rule over the former US colony. Colonization by the US, in turn, is a historical factor that has greatly influenced the country's ideological leanings and steered its cultural preferences. Sam Gindin wrote that "the Philippines remains a dangerous place to be a union organizer."

- Escalante massacre
- Mendiola massacre
- Negros killings
- 2021 Calabarzon raids

=== Australasia ===
Australia

- a striking stevedore was killed by police in the 1919 Fremantle Wharf riot, Fremantle, Western Australia
- one striking union worker was killed outright, and forty wounded by gunfire, when police shot into a crowd in the 1929 Rothbury riot, New South Wales, described as "the bloodiest event in national industrial history."

New Zealand

- Only three people have been killed in New Zealand's industrial history: Fred Evans, killed in 1912 in the Waihi miners' strike, Christine Clarke, the wife of a picketing worker struck by a car on New Year's Eve 1999, and the victim of a suitcase bomb was left in the foyer of the Trades Hall in Wellington, 27 March 1984. The Trades Hall was the headquarters of a number of trade unions, and it is most commonly assumed that they were the target of the bombing, although other theories have been put forward. Ernie Abbott, the building's caretaker, was killed when he attempted to move the suitcase, which is believed to have contained three sticks of gelignite triggered by a mercury switch. To this day, the perpetrator has never been identified. Those elements of the New Zealand Police responsible for preventing and investigating such crimes were headquartered in the building across the street.

== See also ==
- Labor spies
- Union busting
- Union violence
- Strikebreaker
- List of worker deaths in United States labor disputes
- Anti-union organizations in the United States
