= Cambodian Alliance of Trade Unions =

Trade union federation of manufacturing workers in Cambodia

CATU
- Founded: 2011
- Headquarters: Street No 5 #12B; Phumi Chark Angre Krom; Khan Mean Chey; Phnom Penh
- Location: Cambodia
- Key people: Yang Sophorn, President
- Affiliations: CCU, IndustriALL Global Union
- Website: catucambodia.org

The Cambodian Alliance of Trade Unions (CATU) is a trade union federation of manufacturing workers in Cambodia. The federation was founded in 2011 and is affiliated with the Cambodian Confederation of Unions and IndustriALL Global Union.

== History ==
CATU was formed in 2011.

In March 2012, CATU encouraged factory workers to strike if their pay was not doubled to $120 a month. Rong Chhun, president of the Cambodian Confederation of Unions (CCU), supported the demands. The union together with the Coalition of Cambodian Apparel Workers' Democratic Union (C.CAWDU) and the National Independent Federation Textile Union of Cambodia (NIFTUC) sent a letter to the Garment Manufacturers Association in Cambodia (GMAC) detailing their demands. In response, the factory owners' association said that there could be no discussion of a pay raise until 2014. In April of that year, CATU called on the Ministry of Labour to encourage factory owners to give advance pay to workers so they could travel home for Cambodian New Year. The ministry and GMAC declined to do so.

In July of that year, a representative of CATU was beaten bloody by police when he and workers of Tai Yang garment factory attempted to march to the residence of Hun Sen to deliver a petition of demands. The union representative was later let go after he signed a confession saying that he was sorry for causing "the scuffle" and promised not to file a complaint. CATU later led the workers at Tai Yang on a several weeks long strike, which led to the company filing charges of incitement and defamation against CATU president Yang Sophorn. In July, three quarters of Tai Yang workers had returned to work after a deal including seniority bonuses. However, a minority of workers continued the strike. On June 25, Tai Yang fired 25 of the striking workers. This led to the involvement of the American Solidarity Center, who attempted to negotiate their reinstatement. In December, CATU and C.CAWDU said that over 60 of their leaders had been fired throughout the year for organising co-workers at garment factories. According to the unions, the organisers also suffered threats and discrimination. They alleged that this harsh repression was due to the connections between their national trade union centre, the CCU, and national opposition parties.

In December 2013, CATU workers protested at Tainan Enterprises factory, demanding their wage should be raised to $160. The company filed complaints against them and the Ministry of the Interior questioned six union representatives in January and demanded the payment of $100,000 in compensations to the factory owners. The union representatives declined to pay. During the 2013–2014 Cambodian protests, CATU kept up their demand of raising the minimum wage to $160 after the Ministry of Labour had raised it to $100. In this, CATU was supported by other unions and Sam Rainsy's Cambodia National Rescue Party. When CNRP negotiations with the ruling Cambodian People's Party did not include the minimum wage, CATU said it understood that the investigation of the 2013 Cambodian general election had to come first. At the same time, more than 1,000 workers at Manhattan garment factory in Kampong Cham Province walked off their jobs to protest the firing of seven CATU organisers who led the workers in a general strike for the minimum wage raise. CATU president Cheang Thida was among 11 union leaders arrested on January 21 while attempting to deliver a petition to the embassies of the US and France in Phnom Penh.

In February, the owners of over 170 factories said they would seek charges against the union leaders involved in the strikes of the months before. The complaint named CATU, C.CAWDU, NIFTUC, the Free Trade Union, the Cambodian Independent Teachers' Association and the Collective Union of Movement of Workers. Labour minister Ith Sam Heng said the unions should stop protests since they were of no benefit, while GMAC took out advertisements questioning the right to strike. Meanwhile, government claimed it had achieved freedom and human dignity "in all aspects". In March, unions including CATU again led a general strike demanding a raise of the minimum pay. However, many unions pulled out of the plan under government pressure and CATU and the National Trade Unions Coalition could only mobilise around 10,000 workers from 14 factories to join the strike. In April, garment factories countered another planned strike by prolonging New Year's celebrations. Later that year, CATU president Yang Sophorn was prohibited from meeting with other union leaders or attending demonstrations while awaiting trial for alleged violence during protests in January.

In October 2016, CATU expressed concerns with the new trade union law passed in May, saying it had faced problems with registering new affiliations and restrictions with assisting workers. In December of that year, CATU took part in protests demanding the adoption of ILO Conventions 183 and 189, regarding maternity protection and the rights of domestic workers, respectively. The union then lauded the Ministry of Labour's decision to ratify the conventions in question.

In August 2020, CATU was one of the many unions internationally to condemn the arrest of Rong Chhun.
