= Cambodian Labour Confederation =

National trade union centre in Cambodia

- សហភាពការងារកម្ពុជា
- Founded: 9 April 2006
- Headquarters: 2,3G, St. 26BT, Thnout Chrom Village, Sangkat Boeng Tompun, Khan Meanchey, Phnom Penh
- Location: Cambodia
- Members: 112,278
- Key people: Kong Athit, President; Heng Choeun, Secretary General; Heng Chenda, Treasurer
- Website: www.clccambodia.org

The Cambodian Labour Confederation (CLC) is a national trade union centre in Cambodia. The politically independent centre was formed by C.CAWDU in 2006.

== Political position ==
CLC is politically independent of Cambodia's government and often opposes the government and unions associated with it. Unlike the Cambodian Confederation of Unions, however, CLC is willing to take part in negotiations and discussions involving government representatives and does not involve itself in political issues outside of labour questions.

== History ==
The CLC was formed by C.CAWDU on April 9, 2006.

In 2010, CLC led national strikes demanding an increase in the minimum wage of garment workers. CLC also signed a memorandum of understanding together with the Garment Manufacturers Association of Cambodia (GMAC) that year that supported the right to collective bargaining.

In 2012, CLC organised strikes at Win Shing-tex Cambodia garment factory, demanding an increase in pay and the rehiring of fired union representatives. Ath Thun, president of CLC, accused the company of setting up a rival union to weaken striking workers and discouraging workers from joining C.CAWDU. On March 27, police attacked a rally of 900 Wing Shing-tex workers, breaking a worker's nose and injuring two others. In the same year, CLC protested against a new memorandum of understanding, saying GMAC was trying to exclude C.CAWDU from the negotiations. The main point of contention was a point on fixed-duration short-term contracts, which C.CAWDU rejected.

In 2013, CLC issued a statement calling for the conviction of Chhouk Bandith, a former governor of Bavet, Svay Rieng Province, who had shot and injured three workers during a protest there the year before. In November of that year, police killed one person and injured six others at a CLC-organised rally in Phnom Penh. About 600 striking employees of SL Garment Processing had tried to march to the house of Prime Minister Hun Sen. A stand-off with police escalated, with workers throwing rocks and bricks and police retaliating with water cannons. Workers burned police vehicles and forced policemen into hiding inside a nearby pagoda until reinforcements fired into the riot with live ammunition and tear gas.

CLC supported Vorn Pov, president of its affiliate Independent Democratic Informal Economic Association, when Pov stood trial in 2014 on charges of intentional damage following the 2013–2014 Cambodian protests. Also in that year, CLC supported 17 bus drivers, who were fired by Phnom Penh bus company Sorya Bus when they tried to start a union. In September, Sorya Bus reinstated three and paid severance to nine others while CLC filed a lawsuit questioning the legality of the firing of the remaining five. In October, CLC organised a rally in front of the Ministry of Labour, protesting new union registration rules that they claimed were aimed at preventing union growth.

== Affiliates ==
- Coalition of Cambodian Apparel Workers' Democratic Union (C.CAWDU)
- Building and Wood Workers Trade Union Federation of Cambodia (BWTUC)
- Cambodian Tourism and Service Workers' Federation (CTSWF)
- Independent Democratic Informal Economic Association (IDEA)
- Cambodian Independent Civil-Servant Association (CICA)
- Cambodian Food and Service Workers Federation (CFSWF)
- Farmers Association for Peace and Development (FAPD)
