= Yang Sophorn =

Cambodian trade unionist

- យ៉ាង សុភ័ណ្ឌ

President of the Cambodian Alliance of Trade Unions
- Incumbent
- Assumed office December 2011

Personal details
- Born: 21 January 1982 (age 44) Chroy Dorng Village, Samraong Thom Commune, Kien Svay District, Kandal Province, Cambodia
- Children: 2
- Occupation: Trade unionist

Yang Sophorn (born 21 January 1982) is a Cambodian trade unionist and president of the Cambodian Alliance of Trade Unions (CATU). She has been active in the Cambodian trade union movement since 1999 and the subject of both official warnings from the Ministry of Labor and Vocational Training and criminal charges later overturned on appeal. Sophorn has been recognized both domestically within Cambodia and internationally for her trade union activities. She has been vocal in demanding global apparel brands which source from Cambodia such as Nike and Adidas be responsible for labor violations in their overseas supply chains.

== Biography ==
Sophorn was born on 21 January 1982 in Chroy Dorng Village, Samraong Thom Commune, Kien Svay District, Kandal Province. Born into poverty, Sophorn first began work in a woodcraft factory at the age of eleven, before shifting to work in a garment factory the following year at twelve years old. In 1999, at the age of seventeen, Sophorn was elected president of the local Free Trade Union of Workers of the Kingdom of Cambodia (FTUWKC)-affiliated trade union in her factory. The next year, in 2000, she was elected vice-president of FTUWKC and served during the time in which the union's president, Chea Vichea, was murdered.

In December 2011, alongside hundreds of other workers, Sophorn participated in the formation of the Cambodian Alliance of Trade Unions (CATU), a trade union federation operation in the textile and manufacturing sectors and was elected the union's inaugural president. The union received registration status from the Ministry of Labor and Vocational Training in January 2012.

Under Sophorn's leadership, CATU rapidly expanded its membership and recruitment activities and began actively advocating for both the fundamental rights of and improved benefits for its members. In June 2012, Sophorn led a strike of approximately 400 workers at Tai Yang Enterprises after workers feared the factory's announced name change would lead to a loss in seniority benefits. The following month, Sophorn was summoned by the Kandal Provincial Court on allegations of incitement and defamation in connection with the strike. Two weeks after the summons was issued, Sophorn was injured when a group of approximately sixty police intervened to prevent her and striking Tai Yang workers from gathering near National Road 4.

Sophorn was an active participant in the 2013-14 Cambodian protests, with CATU leading a number of protests alongside other trade unions in pursuit of demands for higher minimum wage rates in the textile sector. In March 2014, two months after the wider protests, Sophorn attempted to organize another nation-wide strike of textile workers to demand a minimum wage of US$160 per month, however the initiative failed when other unions pulled out.

In April 2016, Sophorn was part of a group protesting the passage of the Law on Trade Unions in front of the National Assembly before a clash broke out between the protestors and security guards, leaving two union activists with head injuries and Sophorn also injured in the melee. Sophorn was outspoken in the law's drafting process, raising concerns that the law failed to protect workers' or unions' rights and interests. Following the law's passage, Sophorn has complained of restrictions on peaceful demonstrations and the ability for unions to represent workers owing to implementation of the Law on Trade Unions.

In June 2016, Sophorn was re-elected for a second term as President of CATU.

In July 2018, Sophorn, along with trade union leaders Pao Sina, Morm Nhem, Ath Thorn, Chea Mony and Rong Chhun, was charged with aggravated intentional violence, threat to destroy and obstruction of public traffic purportedly committed on Veng Sreng Boulevard during the 2013-14 protests. In December, Sophorn and the other five union leaders were convicted in a trial at the Phnom Penh Court of First Instance where their charges were altered to instigating aggravated intentional violence, threats of destruction and obstruction of public traffic. Sophorn received a two-and-a-half year wholly suspended prison sentence and was ordered to jointly pay 35 million Khmer Riel in medical costs alongside the other convicted union leaders. In May 2019, Sophorn's conviction and those of the other five trade union leaders was overturned by the Appeal Court.

Following the announced closure of Violet Apparel (Cambodia) Co., Ltd in June 2020, Sophorn led a strike of over 1,000 workers demanding benefits they claimed had not been paid to them. The Ministry of Labor and Vocational Training responded to the protest by issuing Sophorn with an official warning, accusing her of having incited and led an illegal demonstration and stating that her union could be dissolved if the protest continued. Sophorn rejected the Ministry's accusations, stating that as a union leader she had the right to meet with her members and that she hadn't threatened anyone.

In September 2020, Sophorn was re-elected for a third term as president of CATU, with Morm Channa elected as vice-president, Mai Sopheakday as secretary and Mao Srey Mom as treasurer.

Sophorn was further warned by the Ministry of Labor and Vocational Training in August 2022 in connection with ongoing protests at NagaWorld casino led by the Labor Rights Supported Union of Khmer Employees of NagaWorld (LRSU). The Ministry warned Sophorn against conducting union activities outside of her sector and to cease forcing NagaWorld workers to continue their strike, stating that she would be subject to "punishment" if she continued her "illegal activities". The warning came shortly after Sophorn had threatened to call out CATU members to join the NagaWorld strike if it was not quickly resolved. In response, a group of twenty-four Cambodian unions and civil society organizations issued a statement collectively rejecting the warning issued to Sophorn and approximately fifty NagaWorld workers also petitioned the Ministry to rescind the warning.
