= Criticism of Coca-Cola =

Criticisms of Coca-Cola products

Since its invention by John Stith Pemberton in 1886, criticisms of Coca-Cola as a product, and of the business practices of The Coca-Cola Company, have been significant. The Coca-Cola Company is the largest soft drink company in the world, distributing over 500 different products. Since the early 2000s, the criticism of the use of Coca-Cola products, as well as the company itself, escalated, with criticism leveled at the company over health effects, environmental issues, animal testing, economic business practices and employee issues. The Coca-Cola Company has been faced with multiple lawsuits concerning the various criticisms.

== Coca-Cola's first trial ==
In 1909, the Pure Food and Drug Act passed, and the United States government seized 40 barrels and 20 kegs of Coca-Cola syrup because they considered the added caffeine to be a harmful ingredient. One of the first noted criticisms of Coca-Cola was that it produced serious mental and motor deficits. This resulted in Coca-Cola's first lawsuit and trial where the official charges were that Coca-Cola was adulterated and misbranded. The trial following the lawsuit, The United States Government v. Forty Barrels, Twenty Kegs Coca-Cola, started in March 1911 a year and a half after the government had seized the barrels and kegs. Harvey Washington Wiley, a chemist and head of the Bureau of Chemistry in the U.S. Department of Agriculture led the lawsuit. Wiley was anti Coca-Cola mainly because he was against the added caffeine. The trial included many studies as well as paid testimonies from both parties and in the end was dismissed by the judge. However, the United States government ended up winning the case when they took it to the Supreme Court in 1916. This resulted in the reduction of caffeine content in Coca-Cola.

== Products ==
=== Caffeine ===
In 1916, there was a federal suit under which the US government unsuccessfully attempted to force The Coca-Cola Company to remove caffeine from its products.

=== Bottles ===
In 1944, a waitress named Gladys Escola was putting away glass bottles of Coca-Cola when one of the bottles spontaneously exploded in her hand. She successfully sued the company, claiming they were liable.

=== Health effects ===
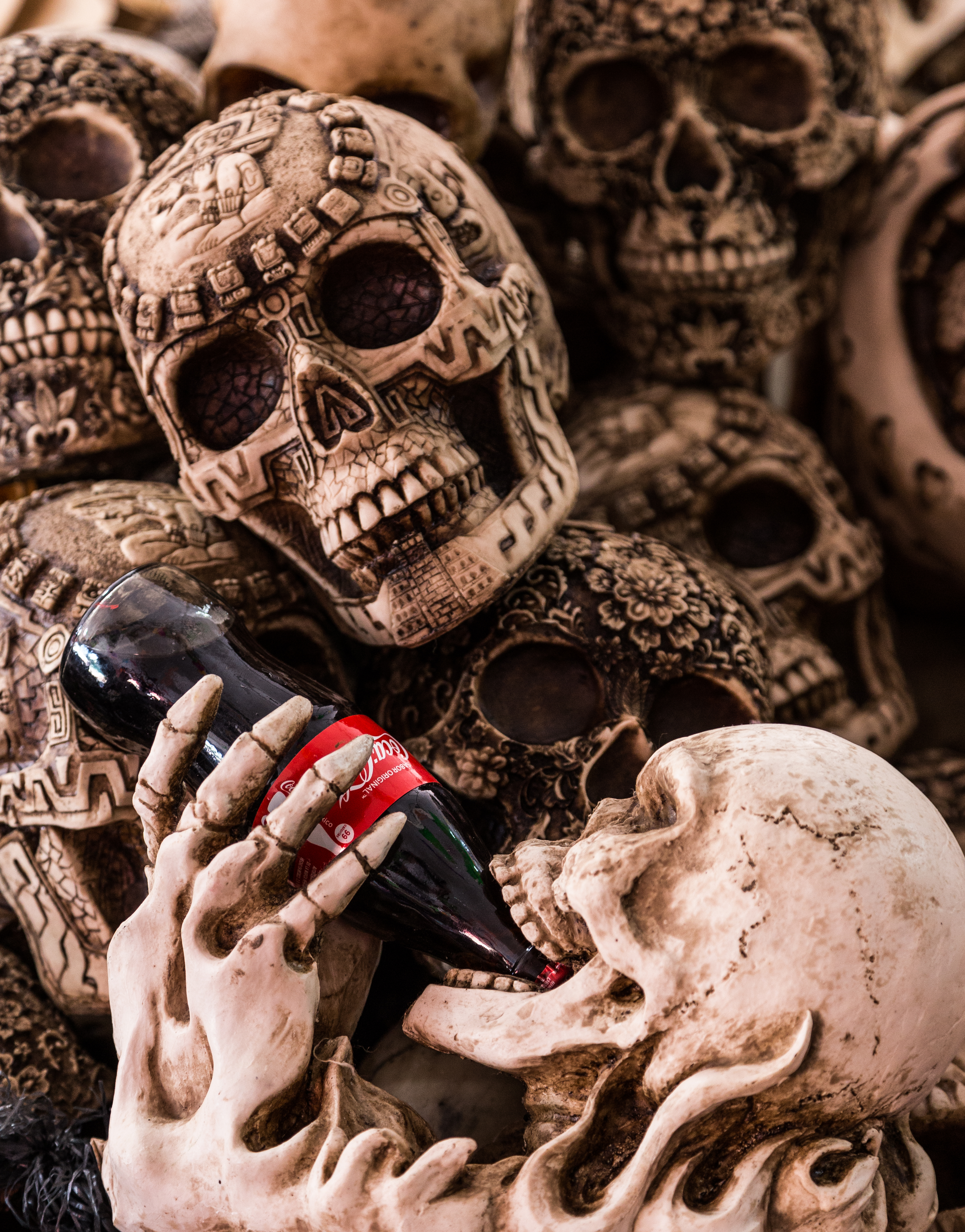
A booth in the annual Alfeñique fair, in León, Guanajuato, Mexico

Coca-Cola is rich in sugar, especially sucrose, which causes dental caries when consumed regularly. Besides this, the high caloric value contributes to obesity. Both are major health issues in the developed world. According to the Harvard School of Public Health in 2015, "...people who drink 1–2 cans of sugary beverages daily are 26% more likely to develop type 2 diabetes, Medical News Today reported on a study claiming 184,000 global deaths each year are down to sugary drink consumption." Nutritionist Rosemary Stanton has criticised the company's reduced sugar options, as a can of Coca-Cola with Stevia still contains 37% of an adult's recommended daily intake of sugar.

Coca-Cola Co. partially funded the pro-industry advocacy group International Life Sciences Institute (ILSI) for many years prior to ending their support for the organization in 2021. ILSI was founded by a former Coca-Cola Co. executive in 1978, and has employed a number of former high level Coca-Cola Co. employees. The organization promotes physical activity rather than dietary changes to address obesity, taking a position similar to Coca-Cola Co.-funded research and messaging.

=== Vitamin Water lawsuit ===
In January 2009, the US consumer group the Center for Science in the Public Interest filed a class-action lawsuit against Coca-Cola. The lawsuit was in regard to claims made, along with the company's flavors, of Vitamin Water. Claims say that the 33 grams of sugar are more harmful than the vitamins and other additives are helpful. Coca-Cola insists the suit is "ridiculous."

=== Coca-Cola and Catalan language ===
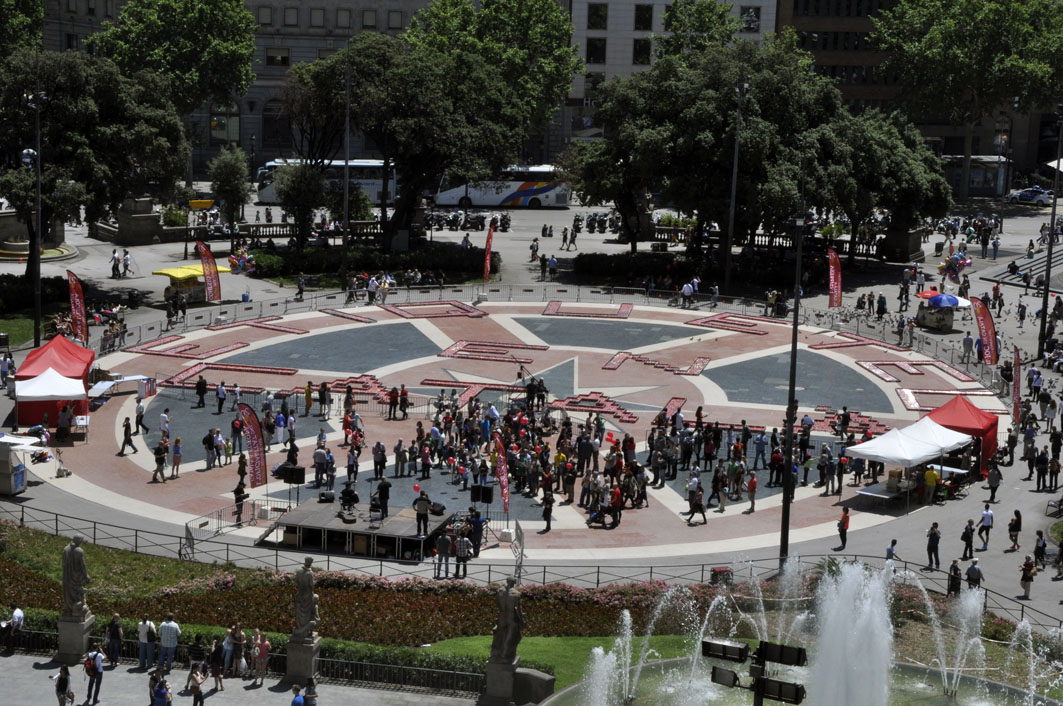
40,000 Coca-Cola cans on May 31, 2014, Barcelona

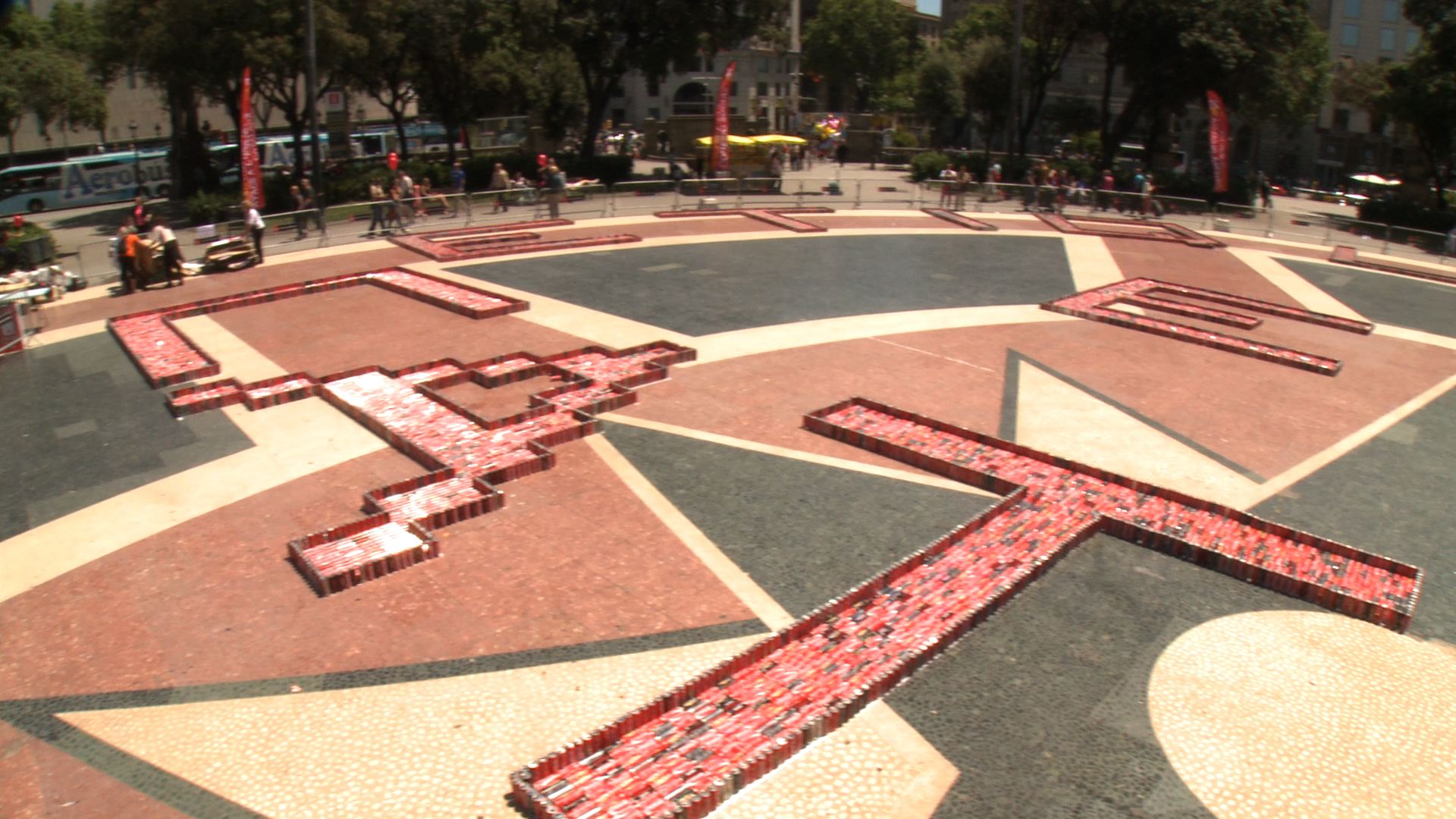
RepteCocacola CAT

In Catalonia, there has been controversy regarding Coca-Cola's refusal to print its labels in Catalan. On December 12, 1993, the Platform for the Catalan Language (Plataforma per la Llengua) managed to make a world record by bringing together more than 15,000 empty Coca-Cola cans in Barcelona's central square Plaça de Catalunya and using them to build a giant sign that read "Let's label in Catalan". At the time, the organisation adopted the motto: "The Coca-Cola label in 135 languages around the world, but not in Catalan?".

On May 31, 2014, Plataforma per la Llengua, recalling the act of the December 12, 1993, collected over 40,000 Coca-Cola cans for making a mosaic with the letters "Etiqueteu en Català!" (Label in Catalan!) in the heart of Barcelona, Catalonia, at Plaça de Catalunya to demand the company label in Catalan after more than 20 years of lawsuits.

=== Mislabelling ===
In 2014, POM Wonderful unsuccessfully argued that Coca-Cola's Minute Maid division had mislabeled a product as a pomegranate and blueberry juice, when it was made 99.4% from apple and grape juices. POM Wonderful said this labelling caused unfair loss of sales of its own pomegranate and blueberry juice.

== Environmental issues ==
=== Water use ===
In March 2004, local officials in Kerala shut down a $16 million Coke bottling plant blamed for a drastic decline in both quantity and quality of water available to local farmers and villagers. In April 2005, the Kerala High Court rejected water use claims, noting that wells there continued to dry up last summer, months after the local Coke plant stopped operating. Further, a scientific study requested by the court found that while the plant had "aggravated the water scarcity situation," the "most significant factor" was a lack of rainfall. The case has been appealed and a decision is pending. In 2017, Coca-Cola declared that it had no plans to restart bottling operations in Plachimada, Kerala. In June 2021, the factory was converted into a Covid-19 First Line treatment center.

In the investor summit held in Indore, Madhya Pradesh in 2016, the state government allocated land for Coca-Cola plant at Babai in Hoshangabad. The government gave all the required permissions but did not publicize the Rs. 750 crore investment project due to the controversies of water exploitation by the company. It became a serious issue and Chief Minister Shivraj Singh Chouhan distanced himself from the project. The residents of Babai opposed the project as the plant, when built, would consume tens of thousands of litres of water daily, thereby depleting the water level of the nearby river Narmada. In order to stop the project, residents started a signature campaign to garner support for the cause and passed a resolution against the company. They also attacked state government that on one hand, it was talking about taking measures to save the river and on the other hand, gave permission to set up the plant. The government canceled the land allocation in 2022, as Coca-Cola did not break ground on the plant within a five-year period, as was agreed-upon in the contract. Coca-Cola stated that it decided against building the plant due to the company re-franchising.

In January 2017, Tamil Nadu Vanigar Sangangalin Peramaipu (TNVSP) called for its members to stop selling Coca-Cola and PepsiCo products to show solidarity with local farmers who had complained about groundwater depletion caused by these companies. In 2016–17 Tamil Nadu experienced a severe drought which fueled the animosity. TNVSP consists of over 6,000 local trade associations covering about 1.5 million (15 Lakh) traders across Tamil Nadu, a southern Indian state. The boycott came into effect from March 1, and the majority of the small and medium-sized vendors were reported to have stopped stocking the products. The boycott gained momentum during the Jallikattu protests.

=== Packaging ===
Packaging used in Coca-Cola's products has a significant environmental impact. The company is the single largest plastic polluter in the world, producing over 3 million tonnes of plastic packaging each year. The head of sustainability Bea Perez has said they will continue to use plastic, stating "customers like them because they reseal and are lightweight" and that they create a lower carbon footprint than aluminum and glass bottles.

The company has opposed attempts to introduce mechanisms such as container deposit legislation. In 2013, the company was criticized in Australia for undertaking litigation that led to the invalidation of a bottle recycling deposit.

In 2017 Greenpeace published a report criticizing Coca-Cola's use of single-use plastic bottles. The report is especially critical of the company's failing to reach the goals it set to source 25% of its bottles from recycled or renewable sources, and the non-existence of targets to reduce its use of single-use bottles since then. Greenpeace also claimed that Coca-Cola has actively lobbied against recycling and deposit return schemes in several European countries, while at the same time maintaining a green marketing facade with vague promises and false-solutions such as sizable donations to schemes that put the emphasis of anti-littering on the consumer, instead of the producer of the litter itself. In 2022, Greenpeace stated that it welcomed Coca-Cola’s pledge to make 25% of its packaging reusable by 2030.

=== Air pollution ===
In 2015, the company was accused of 27 Clean Air Act violations at a Minute Maid plant in Michigan. In May 2014, Coca-Cola reached a settlement with the EPA for these violations, in which it paid $165,900 in civil penalties.

== Animal testing ==
In 2007, the Coca-Cola Company announced it would no longer conduct or directly fund laboratory experiments on animals unless required by law to do so. The company's announcement came after PETA criticized the company for funding invasive experiments on animals including one study in which experimenters cut into the face of chimpanzees to study the animals' nerve impulses used in the perception of sweet taste. Some experimenters have criticized PETA's campaign against Coca-Cola and other companies claiming that their work would be stalled if they lost corporate funding.

== Economic business practices ==
=== Anti-competitive practices ===
In 2000, a United States federal judge dismissed an antitrust lawsuit filed by PepsiCo Inc. accusing Coca-Cola Co. of monopolizing the market for fountain-dispensed soft drinks in the United States.

In June 2005, Coca-Cola in Europe formally agreed to end deals with shops and bars to stock its drinks exclusively after a European Union investigation found its business methods stifled competition.

In November 2005, Coca-Cola's Mexican unit – Coca-Cola Export Corporation – and a number of its distributors and bottlers were fined $68 million for unfair commercial practices. Coca-Cola is appealing the case.

=== "Channel stuffing" settlement ===
On July 7, 2008, Coca-Cola Co compromised to pay $137.5 million to settle an October 2000 shareholder lawsuit. Coca-Cola was charged in a U.S. District Court for the Northern District of Georgia, with "forcing some bottlers to purchase hundreds of millions of dollars of unnecessary beverage concentrate to make its sales seem higher." Institutional investors, led by Carpenters Health & Welfare Fund of Philadelphia & Vicinity, accused Coca-Cola of "channel stuffing," or artificial inflation of Coca-Cola's results which gave investors a false picture of the company's health. The settlement applies to Coca-Cola common stock owners from October 21, 1999, to March 6, 2000.

=== Investments and operations in apartheid South Africa ===
Coca-Cola entered South Africa in 1938 and, after the beginning of the official white South African government's policy of apartheid or "separate development" beginning in 1948, the company grew rapidly. By the 1980s at the height of racial oppression, with 90% of the market, Coke dominated the soft-drink industry with sales in the hundreds of millions of dollars, accounting for 5% of the parent company's global market. Coke employed 4,500 workers, operating under the racially segregated system of housing, workplace, and wages, and was one of the largest employers in the country.

In 1982 in South Africa, black workers asked the community to boycott Coke and called two work stoppages until the company agreed to recognize and bargain with their union, raise its workers' low wages significantly, and share information on who controls their pension fund.

As a result of Coke's economic support of white South Africa and its apartheid system, in the 1980s, it became a major target of organizers across the country against U.S. and corporate economic support for apartheid in the U.S. Boycotts then spread across the country to many universities including Tennessee State, Penn State, and Compton College in California, which established a "Coke Free Campus". Demonstrations were held by the Georgia Coalition and the AFSC at Coca-Cola's Atlanta headquarters.

In South Africa, in 1986, the Coca-Cola response was to donate US$10 million to a fund to support improvements of housing and education for black South Africans and to announce "...plans to sell its 30% share of a major bottler and a 55% share of a canning operation within six to nine months." (The company's assets there were estimated at US$60 million, their annual sales were circa US$260 million, and with 4,300 workers one of the largest U.S. employers in South Africa.) However, the movement in the U.S. demanded full divestiture and did not accept the company's offer to sell a major portion of the holdings to a South African firm.

After democratic elections that produced Mandela's majority rule government, Pepsi sought to re-enter the South African market. In fact, "Coke never truly left the country, leading to overwhelming dominance through the rest of the 20th century. Pepsi adhered to different social imperatives and suffered exceptionally low market shares as a result." Indeed, in the late 2000s, Coke's market share of the soft drink market in South Africa was estimated at 95% and Pepsi's at 2%.

=== Marketing issues ===
In 2001, Coca-Cola reportedly paid Warner Brothers, a unit of Time Warner $150 million for the exclusive global marketing rights to at least one Harry Potter movie and subsequently enticing children to drink more soft drinks, a move criticized by the Center for Science in the Public Interest.

On August 9, 2015, the New York Times published an article that revealed that Coca-Cola had made a large investment in the non-profit called the Global Energy Balance Network, which promoted a scientific solution to the obesity crisis, which was that more exercise rather than cutting back on calories was the way to maintain a healthy weight. Health experts stated that the non-profit's message was misleading and part of Coke to deflect criticism about the role the company played in the spread of obesity and Type 2 diabetes.

In 2026, a marketing campaign for personalized cans was halted after a social media backlash about terms that Coca-Cola had censored. Terms such as "Free Palestine," "Black Lives Matter," and "Jesus is Lord" were among the censored terms.

=== Im Tirtzu ===
On May 7, 2017, Haaretz published that Coca-Cola has donated 50,000 NIS (approximately $14,000) to Israeli right-wing nationalist organization Im Tirtzu. The organization, that was declared by Israeli court to have "certain lines of resemblance to fascism", asked to leave the donation private but the Israeli Corporations Authority forced the Organization to publish the donation.

=== 2022 Russian Invasion of Ukraine ===
On February 22, 2022, Coca-Cola announced that the company began to accumulate ingredients for the production of drinks in Russia in order to minimize the damage of the sanctions that Western countries threatened Russia following Moscow's recognition of two breakaway Ukrainian regions. After a week of Russian invasion of Ukraine, on March 3, 2022, Coca-Cola announced that the company would not stop working in Russia and that all of Coke's operational, production and logistics facilities in Russia are working. As the result, on March 4, 2022, most Ukrainian supermarkets refused to cooperate with Coca-Cola and sell any of Coke's products. Within days, the campaign to boycott Coca-Cola for its continued operations in Russia had become international. Celebrities who criticized Coca-Cola over this include American author Stephen King.

On March 8, 2022, Coca-Cola announced it would be suspending its business in Russia, stating that "Our hearts are with the people who are enduring unconscionable effects from these tragic events in Ukraine."

=== AI-generated advertisements ===
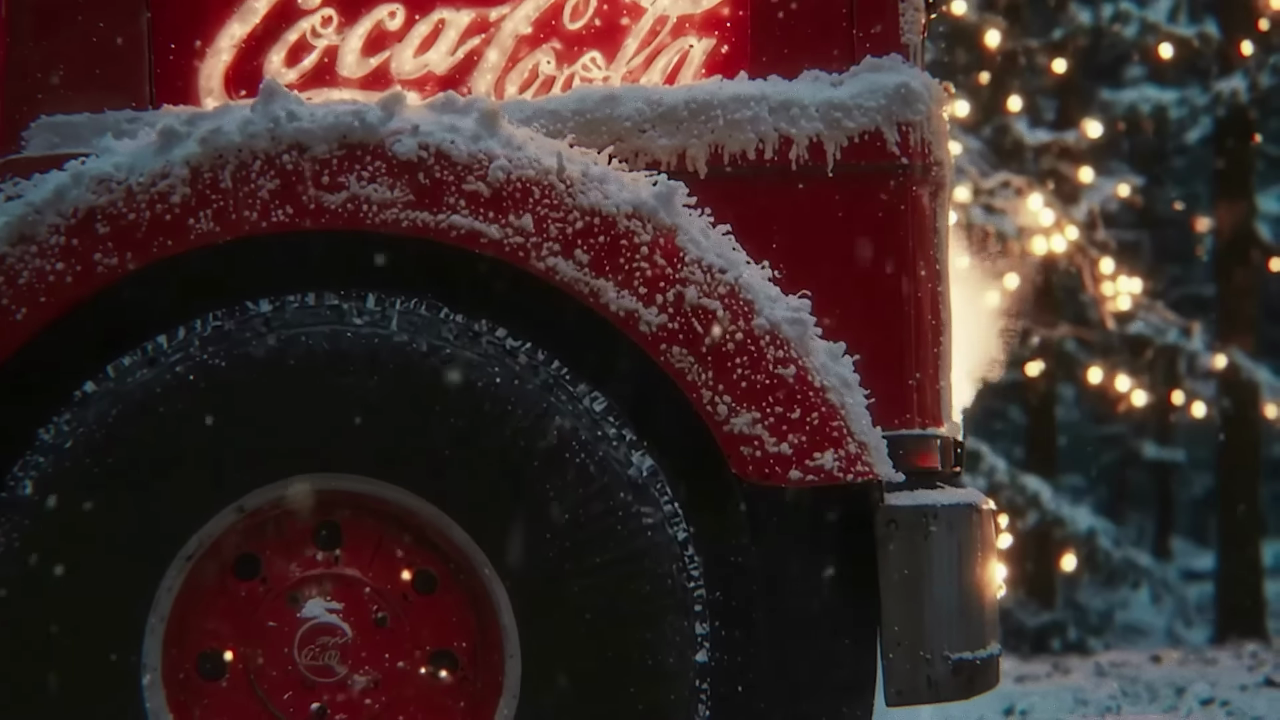
Screenshot from one of the AI-generated Coca-Cola holiday commercials, showing the Coca-Cola logo misspelled as "Coca-Coola"

On November 15, 2024, Coca-Cola released its AI-generated Christmas-themed advertisement titled "The Holiday Magic is Coming." The video was intended as a tribute to Coca-Cola’s 1995 "Holidays Are Coming" commercial, which featured similar imagery but used human actors and real trucks.

The AI-generated nature of the advertisement led to backlash from viewers and artists, with critics arguing that it lacked the authenticity and warmth of its predecessor. Some also expressed concerns over the implications of replacing human artists with AI-generated content. In response, a Coca-Cola spokesperson stated: "We are always exploring new ways to connect with consumers and experiment with different approaches. This year, we crafted films through a collaboration of human storytellers and the power of generative AI. Coca-Cola will always remain dedicated to creating the highest level of work at the intersection of human creativity and technology."

Another AI-generated advertisement was released a year later on November 3, 2025, which received similar criticism.

== Employee issues ==
=== Racial discrimination ===
In November 2000, Coca-Cola agreed to pay $192.5 million to settle a class action racial discrimination lawsuit and promised to change the way it manages, promotes, and treats minority employees in the US. Following the settlement, Coca-Cola donated $1.5 million to the American Institute for Managing Diversity to create the Diversity Leadership Academy of Atlanta, “a leadership development program for executive level business and community leaders.” Coca-Cola executive Juan Johnson, an African-American, served as the first president of the Diversity Leadership Academy of Atlanta.

In 2003, protesters at Coca-Cola's annual meeting claimed that black people remained underrepresented in top management at the company, were paid less than white employees, and were fired more often. In 2004, Luke Visconti, a co-founder of DiversityInc, which rates companies on their diversity efforts, said: "Because of the settlement decree, Coca-Cola was forced to put in management practices that have put the company in the top 10 for diversity."

In March 2012, 16 workers of color sued Coca-Cola, claiming they had to work in a “cesspool of racial discrimination.”

In February 2021, recordings of a course available to Coca-Cola employees through LinkedIn Learning were leaked on social media. The course instructed employees to "be less white", which the course equated with being less "arrogant" and "oppressive." Coca-Cola responded with a statement in March 2021, both clarifying that the leaked documents were not an official part of their training curriculum and apologizing for the incident, claiming: "We would never encourage anyone to be any less of themselves."

=== Sinaltrainal v. Coca-Cola Co. ===
In 2001, the Sinaltrainal trade union filed a suit against Coca-Cola in a Miami district court. The union alleged that two Coca-Cola bottling partners, Bebidas y Alimentos and Panamco, assisted paramilitaries in murdering several union members. The court decided charges would be considered against the partners but not Coca-Cola itself. On September 4, 2006, Judge Martinez dismissed the remaining claims against the two bottlers.

=== Turedi v. Coca Cola Co. ===
In 2005, 105 Coca-Cola employees in Turkey were terminated for their union activity and these employees, some of whom were joined by family members, were physically attacked by members of the Cevik Kuvvet during peaceful demonstrations against their terminations.
