= Ouk Chhayavy =

Cambodian trade unionist

President of the Cambodia Independent Teachers' Association
- Incumbent
- Assumed office 2016

Vice President of the Cambodia Independent Teachers' Association
- In office 2013–2016

Ouk Chhayavy is the current president of the Cambodia Independent Teachers' Association (CITA), an office which she has held since 2016.

== Biography ==
Ouk Chhayavy started working as a teacher in 1994.

In 2000, she joined CITA as deputy president in Kandal Province. In 2013, she became the trade union's vice president. In 2016, she became CITA's president.

On August 10, 2020, Ouk was thrown off her motorcycle by unknown attackers in Kandal Province following a visit to the imprisoned Rong Chhun, president of the Cambodian Confederation of Unions. She required stitches afterwards and said she had been followed by strangers since the start of the campaign to release Rong Chhun, which she led. The attack was condemned by the ITUC. According to a report delivered to the OHCHR, neighbours later observed that an unknown man on a motorbike and an assault rifle slung over his shoulder frequently visited her home.

Ouk currently works as a high school teacher. She has two children.
