= Samheng Bora =

Cambodian government official (born 1986)

His Excellency Samheng Bora
- សំហេង បូរ៉ា

Secretary of State
- Incumbent
- Assumed office 23 August 2023
- Monarch: Norodom Sihamoni
- Prime Minister: Hun Manet
- Minister: Cham Nimul
- Constituency: Phnom Penh

Personal details
- Born: 24 February 1986 (age 40) Phnom Penh, Cambodia
- Party: Cambodian People's Party
- Relations: Samheng Boros (sibling)
- Parent: Ith Samheng (father)
- Website: សំហេង បូរ៉ា - Samheng Bora

Samheng Bora (Khmer: សំហេង បូរ៉ា; born 24 February 1986) is a Secretary of State of the Ministry of Commerce of the Royal Government of Cambodia. Bora was appointed to the position on 24 August 2023 for the 7th legislature under the Minister of Commerce, Cham Nimul.

== Early life and career ==
Samheng Bora served as an international relation officer at the Ministry of Social Affairs, Veteran and Youth Rehabilitations (MoSVY) of the Royal Government of Cambodia from 2007. He became the deputy director of the Department of Foreign Affairs and International Cooperation at MoSVY in 2009, working closely with the ASEAN secretariat in coordinating tasks in relations to the ASEAN Socio-Cultural Community pillar for MoSVY, specializing in works related to social welfares and ASEAN social community developments. In 2014, Samheng Bora was appointed as the Deputy Secretary General at the Cambodia National Council for Children (CNCC), where he served for 4 years, assisting in the development of the Juvenile Law as well as overseeing the implementations of general administrative works for the CNCC. He was named Under-Secretary of State at the Ministry of Commerce in 2018, and Secretary of State at the Ministry of Commerce in 2023.

== Personal life ==
Bora is a son of Ith Samheng, a member of the Cambodian National Assembly and the former Minister of Ministry of Labour and Vocational Training. He is a sibling of Samheng Boros, a minister attached to the Prime Minister and former Secretary of State at the Ministry of Social Affairs, Veterans, and Youth Rehabilitation.

For social responsibility, he is also a member of the Union of Youth Federation of Cambodia (UYFC), which Hun Many is the President of the Organization.
