= Timeline of strikes in 2012 =

Strikes in 2012

In 2012, a number of labour strikes, labour disputes, and other industrial actions occurred.

== Background ==
A labour strike is a work stoppage caused by the mass refusal of employees to work. This can include wildcat strikes, which are done without union authorisation, and slowdown strikes, where workers reduce their productivity while still carrying out minimal working duties. It is usually a response to employee grievances, such as low pay or poor working conditions. Strikes can also occur to demonstrate solidarity with workers in other workplaces or pressure governments to change policies.

== Timeline ==
=== Continuing strikes from 2011 ===
- 2011–2012 Kurdish protests in Turkey, including strikes, for the protection of minority rights for Kurds in Turkey.
- 2011–2012 Palestinian protests, including strikes, against the economic policies of the Palestinian Authority.
- Vita Cortex sit-in

=== January ===
- Occupy Nigeria, including strikes, over the removal of fuel subsidies.
- 2012 Romanian protests, including strikes, over proposed healthcare reforms. The start of the 2012–2015 unrest in Romania.

=== February ===
- 2012 Bavet shooting
- 2012–2013 Egyptian protests
- 2012 Halifax transit strike. 41-day strike by transit workers in Halifax, Canada. The first transit strike in Halifax since 1998.
- 2012 Quebec student protests, over tuition fees hikes.

=== March ===
- 2012 South Korean broadcasters' strike

=== May ===
- Asturian miners' strike of 2012

=== June ===
- 2012 NFL referee lockout

=== July ===
- 2012 Hyundai strike

=== August ===
- Marikana miner strike. 6-week wildcat strike by platinum miners in South Africa.
- Western Cape 2012 Farm Workers' strike

=== September ===
- 2012 Chicago Public Schools strike
- 2012–13 NHL lockout

=== November ===
- 2012 European general strike
- 2012 Ports of Los Angeles and Long Beach strike
- 2012 Singapore bus drivers' strike
