= Central Union of Workers =

Labor federation in Colombia

- Central Unitaria de Trabajadores
- Abbreviation: CUT
- Founded: 1986
- Headquarters: Bogotá, Colombia
- Location: Colombia
- President: Tarsicio Mora Godoy
- Secretary General: Domingo Tovar
- Website: www.cut.org.co

The Central Union of Workers (Spanish: Central Unitaria de Trabajadores, CUT) is a federation of trade unions in Colombia. It was formed in 1986, and is the country's largest labor federation, with 546,000 members as of 2006.

== History ==
The Central Union of Workers was formed in 1986 by conservative-led, liberal-led, communist-led, and independent labor unions. This included the Union of Workers of Colombia (UTC) and Union Federation of Workers of Colombia (CSTC).

Perceived disparities in representation of some member organization in the founding 1986 agreement resulted in a unity process in 1988. This ended in the formation of the General Confederation of Democratic Workers (CGTD).

According to the International Centre for Trade Union Rights (ICTUR), nearly 800 members of the CUT were murdered between 1987 and 1992. This included the Vice President of the organization, Jorge Ortega in 1988.

In 2000 a past president of CUT, Luis Eduardo Garzón was awarded the AFL-CIO's human rights award.

== See also ==
- Trade unions in Colombia
