= Trade unions in Colombia =

Trade unions in Colombia were, until around 1990, among the strongest in Latin America. However the 1980s expansion of paramilitarism in Colombia saw trade union leaders and members increasingly targeted for assassination. As a result, Colombia has been the most dangerous country in the world for trade unionists for several decades. Between 1986 and 2010 over 2800 labor leaders were killed according to one source, and over 4000 according to others. Most assassinations were carried out by paramilitaries or the Colombian military; some were carried out by the guerrillas. In 2009 only around 4% of workers in Colombia were unionized.

== Major Union Federations ==
Name	Est.	Members	Website
Central Unitaria de Trabajadores (CUT)	1986	546,000	cut.org.co
Confederación General de Trabajo (CGT)	1971	122,000	cgtcolombia.org
Confederación de Trabajadores de Colombia (CTC)	1936	51,000	ctc-colombia.com.co
Unión de Trabajadores Colombianos (UTC)	1946		confederacionutc.org

== History ==
=== 1920-1946: Beginnings & Growth ===
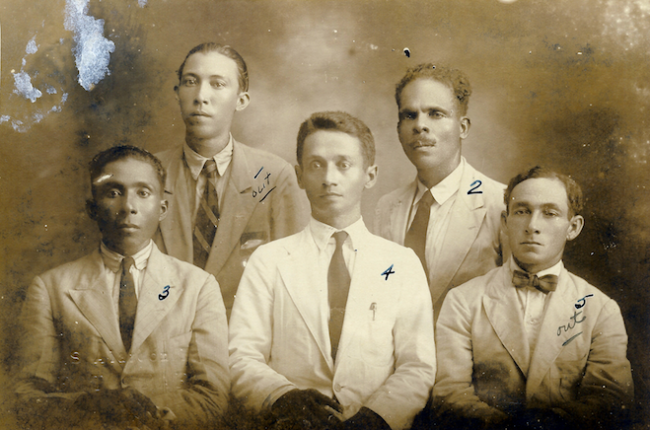
Leaders of the banana strike of 1928, two of whom were killed in the massacre that followed

The development of the Colombian economy in the early 20th century was not as favorable for labor as compared to other Latin American countries, particularly when it came to the key export of coffee, which over the course of the 20th century came to dominate Colombian exports. Coffee, as an industry, was dominated by small growers, whose labor tended to come from the family-unit as opposed to the wage-laborer. While other industries which depend heavily on wage-labor did come to play a significant role in the development of the Colombian economy, these industries did not come to play as significant a role as in other Latin American countries.

This doesn't mean that Colombia's early labor history was without incident. In fact, militant union activity flourished under the employment conditions of foreign firms such as New Jersey Standard Oil and the United Fruit Company, where workers had to migrate to formerly sparsely populated areas of rain forest for employment, and upon arriving found their living conditions to be in stark contrast to those of their foreign employers. A pattern of strikes & suppression emerged in the 1920s within these industries, employees of the former going on strike in 1924 & 1927 only to be met by government intervention, a large strike of the latter in 1928 being infamously ended by the Banana Massacre, where an unknown number of workers (from a few dozen to 3000) were killed after the government sent in military forces.

The working conditions of these Colombian laborers have some famous representation in literature, Jose Eustacio Rivera's La Voragine depicting both the plight of the rubber worker & the rich biodiversity of the Colombian countryside, Gabriel García Márquez's One Hundred Years of Solitude & Álvaro Cepeda Samudio’s La Casa Grande containing fictional versions of the banana massacre.

Colombia had been dominated since the turn of the century by the Conservative party, but the government's loss of prestige following its violent suppression of strikers helped bring them out of office by the end of the decade, ushering in a new decade and a half-long era of Liberal rule, which was characterized by a government more sympathetic to labor. The number of unionized workers doubled under this new Liberal administration. It is during this time period that the first major union confederation, the Confederación de Trabajadores de Colombia (CTC), was established, the confederation not coincidentally having been aligned with the Liberal Party ever since. The Liberals also funded many of their public works projects via an increased tax on foreign firms such as New Jersey Standard Oil and United Fruit, punishment in part because of their recent mistreatment of their workers, and in part because of their close cooperation with the Conservative Party just a decade ago. Liberal support of labor waned towards the end of their tenure as the party in power, as the foreign affairs of the 1940s overshadowed the domestic. In the end, the split between the centrist and more radical reformist wing of the party, as headed by Jorge Eliécer Gaitán, allowed for a Conservative win in 1946, the uneasy transfer of power coupled with Gaitán's assassination shortly thereafter beginning the era of Colombian history known as La Violencia.

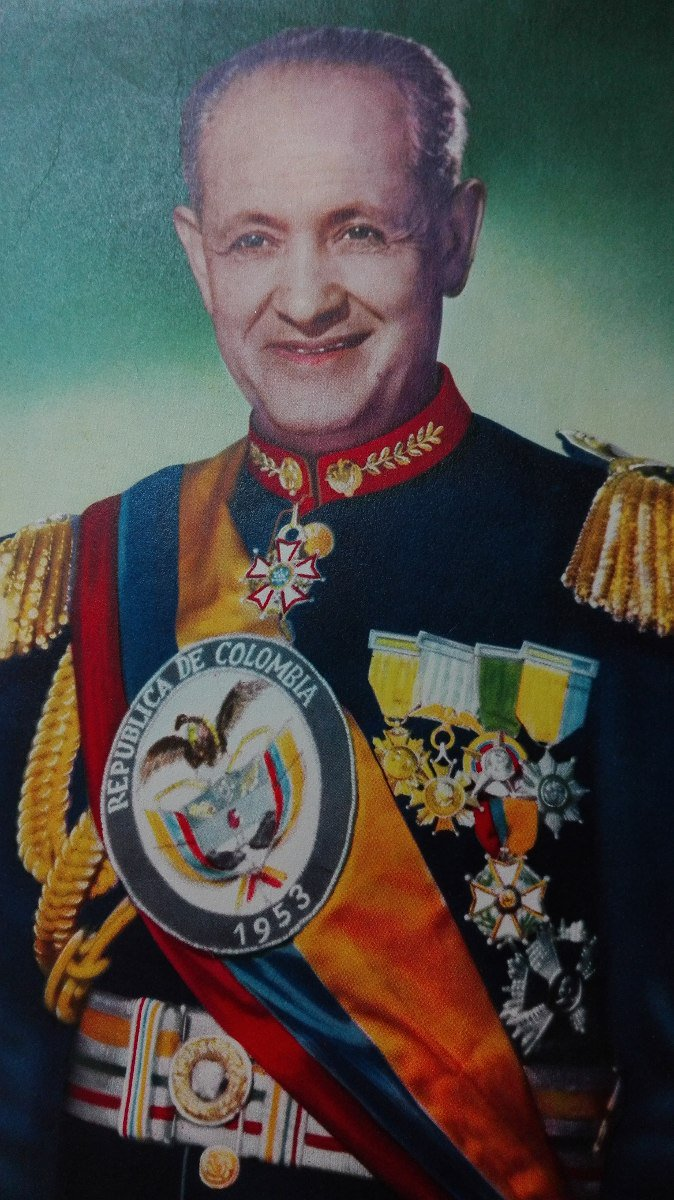
Military dictator Gustavo Rojas Pinilla, who attempted to appeal to Colombian workers to support his regime over conventional two party rule, in a style similar to Argentinian dictator Juan Perón.

=== 1946-1958: The Era of La Violencia & Rojas Pinilla ===
The centrist-radical divide within the Liberal party was mirrored in the CTC, where, in the increasingly hostile environment of the burgeoning cold war and new Conservative government, centrists in the CTC carried out a purge of its communist members. As the Liberal-led CTC was in this weakened state, the Unión de Trabajadores Colombianos (UTC) was founded by Jesuit elements of the Roman Catholic Church. The UTC was based on Catholic social doctrine, and while not having any direct ties with the Conservative party, was certainly favored by the party over the CTC. A core sector of the newly founded UTC were the Catholic trade unions in the textile factories of Medellín, capital of the generally conservative department of Antioquia.

Conservative rule would not last long, as general Gustavo Rojas Pinilla staged a coup d'état in 1953 after then president Laureano Gómez tried to have him dismissed. The ramifications for Colombian trade unions would be significant. The military government supported the creation of the Confederación Nacional del Trabajo (CNT) trade union confederation. CNT was built up along the lines of the Argentinian peronista unions, and CNT was affiliated to the Agrupación de Trabajadores Latinoamericanos Sindicalistas (ATLAS, which was led by the Peronista unions of Argentina). CNT received financial aid from ATLAS. Moreover, CNT received direct support from the Colombian Ministry of Labour through the minister Aurelio Caicedo Ayerbe. CNT was given access to issue propaganda through public radio stations. CNT was actively involved in building the political movement constructed to support the rule of Rojas Pinilla, National Action Movement. CNT and MAN were projected as the constituents of a 'Third Force' in Colombian politics, confronting the two old dominant parties of the country. With a strong anti-oligarchical discourse, Rojas Pinilla sought to utilize CNT and MAN to mobilize popular opinion against the traditional elites and their political parties. At the same time as the government mobilized support to CNT it curbed the activities of the two main party-affiliated trade union centers of the country, the CTC and UTC. The launching of CNT provoked reactions from the opposition side, and a civic opposition front was formed. By the end of 1955 the pressure from the Roman Catholic Church, the Conservatives and UTC forced the government to close down the CNT. The fall of the Rojas Pinilla regime followed soon after.

=== 1958-present ===
The fall of Rojas Pinilla paved the way for almost two decades of bipartisan control of Colombia, called the National Front. Trade unions flourished during this period, as the number of unionized workers more than doubled, and new union confederations were founded, such as the Confederación Sindical de Trabajadores de Colombia (CSTC) in 1964, which had communist leanings. Other union confederations were founded later during the National Front, or shortly after its collapse, such as the Confederación General de Trabajadores (CGT) in 1971, and the Central Unitaria de Trabajadores (CUT) in 1986. "Until the period beginning in 1990, Colombian workers were among the most organized in Latin America, and Colombian trade unions were among the strongest, having won significant economic benefits for workers." Since then, the targeting of unionists by paramilitaries has led to thousands of deaths. Former paramilitary leader Carlos Castaño said that "We kill trade unionists because they interfere with people working."

== Paramilitary Involvement ==
Until around 1990 Colombian trade unions were among the strongest in Latin America. However the 1980s expansion of paramilitarism in Colombia saw trade union leaders and members increasingly targeted for assassination, and as a result Colombia has been the most dangerous country in the world for trade unionists for several decades. Between 2000 and 2010 Colombia accounted for 63.12% of trade unionists murdered globally. According to the International Trade Union Confederation (ITUC) there were 2832 murders of trade unionists between 1 January 1986 and 30 April 2010, meaning that "on average, men and women trade unionists in Colombia have been killed at the rate of one every three days over the last 23 years." Other sources give figures of around 4000 trade union members killed from the mid-1980s to 2008.

According to a 2007 Amnesty International report, in 2005 "around 49 percent of human rights abuses against trade unionists were committed by paramilitaries and some 43 percent directly by the security forces." The Colombian parapolitics scandal revealed widespread links between the government and the paramilitaries, in which then President Alvaro Uribe and his congressional allies were heavily implicated. The government during Uribe's tenure opposed labor both directly & indirectly, the Ministry of Social Protection in 2004 actively labeling many strikes as illegal & suppressing the formation of new unions, while the government turned a blind eye to many instances of paramilitary anti-union violence, around 3,500 unionists having been murdered within a 15-year period (1990-2005), the government only having investigated 600 of theses killings, leading to only 6 convictions. At times the government even engaged in such violence itself, the Colombian Army having killed 3 union leaders in Arauca in 2004. The ITUC in 2010 concluded that "the historical and structural violence against the Colombian trade union movement remains firmly in place, manifesting itself in the form of systematic human and trade union rights violations." From 1986 to 2009, Antioquia Department saw the highest number of murders (46% of the total), while the agricultural workers' union Sintrainagro was the most targeted union (at 844, 31% of the total).

There are reports that US corporations in Colombia have actively colluded with paramilitaries in order to reduce union activity. Besides acknowledged payments from multinationals to the United Self-Defense Forces of Colombia (AUC) (Doe v. Chiquita Brands International), "Trade unionists have been particularly targeted by the paramilitaries, and most of the violence has been directed at leaders of unions of multinational corporations." In 2001 the United Steelworkers of America and the International Labor Rights Fund sued Coca-Cola and its Colombian suppliers in a Miami court on behalf of food workers union Sinaltrainal (Sinaltrainal v. Coca-Cola); the case was dismissed in 2006. A similar suit regarding another US company, Estate of Rodriquez v. Drummond Co., was dismissed in 2007.

According to the ITUC, only 1.2% of workers in Colombia are covered by a collective agreement.

== See also ==
- School of the Americas
- Anti-union violence in the United States
- Anti-union violence
- Union busting
