= Sinaltrainal v. Coca-Cola Co. =

2009 United States Federal Court case

Sinaltrainal v. Coca-Cola Company
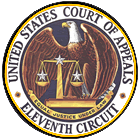
- Court: United States Court of Appeals for the Eleventh Circuit
- Full case name: Sinaltrainal, Isidro Segundo Gil, The Estate of, Luis Eduardo Garcia, Alvaro Gonzalez Lopez, Jose Domingo Flores, Jorge Humberto Leal, Juan Carlos Galvis, Alvaro Gonzalez, John Doe, as representative of the Estate of Isidro Segundo Gil, Luis Adolfo Cardona, John Doe II, Plaintiffs-Appellants, v. Coca-Cola Company, Coca-Cola De Colombia, S.A., Panamerican Beverages Company, LLC, Panamco, LLC, Panamco Industrial De Gaseosas, S.A., A.K.A. Panamco Columbia, S.A., Richard I. Kirby, et al.
- Decided: August 11, 2009
- Citation: 578 F.3d 1252

Case history
- Prior history: 256 F. Supp. 2d 1345 (S.D. Fla. 2003); 474 F. Supp. 2d 1273 (S.D. Fla. 2006)

Court membership
- Judges sitting: Gerald Bard Tjoflat, Susan H. Black, Emmett Ripley Cox

Case opinions
- Majority: Black, joined by unanimous

Laws applied
- Alien Tort Claims Act, 28 U.S.C. § 1350

Sinaltrainal v. Coca-Cola, 578 F.3d 1252 (11th Cir. 2009), was a case in which the United States Court of Appeals for the Eleventh Circuit upheld the dismissal of a case filed by Colombian trade union Sinaltrainal (National Union of Food Workers) against Coca-Cola in a Miami district court, demanding monetary compensation of $500 million under the Alien Tort Claims Act for the deaths of three workers in Colombia.

== Lawsuit ==
In 2001 Sinaltrainal v. Coca-Cola was filed in the Florida Third District Court of Appeal, demanding a monetary compensation for $500 million for the deaths of three workers, members of the National Union for Food Industry Workers who worked in the Coca-Cola Bebidas y Alimentos plant in Carepa in northern Colombia. The lawsuit was brought by the Colombian trade union Sinaltrainal (National Union of Food Workers) and alleged that Panamco, a Colombian Coca-Cola bottling company, assisted paramilitaries in murdering several union members. Even though the alleged human rights violation occurred in Colombia, the union attempted to use the Alien Tort Claims Act (ATCA) to bring the case into a U.S. district court. The ATCA grants U.S. courts jurisdiction in any dispute where it is alleged that a tort has been committed in violation of the "law of nations" or a treaty of the United States. The plaintiffs also alleged violations of the Torture Victims Protection Act (TVPA).

== Appeal ==
On March 31, 2003, the US District Court dismissed the complaint against The Coca-Cola Company because the alleged wrongdoing either occurred in the United States but was too removed from the injury or occurred abroad and did not have a substantial origin within the United States. Federal Judge Jose E. Martinez allowed the case to go forward against two Coca-Cola bottlers: Bebidas y Alimentos and Panamerican Beverages, but not against Coca-Cola itself. On September 4, 2006, Judge Martinez dismissed the remaining claims against the two bottlers.

On August 11, 2009, the United States Court of Appeals for the Eleventh Circuit ruled in favor of Coca-Cola, affirming the District Court's ruling. In dismissing the ATCA claims, the court cited a lack of evidence to link the actions of the paramilitaries to the Colombian government and Coca-Cola. Additionally, the Eleventh Circuit converted the District Court's dismissal of the TVPA claims on jurisdictional grounds to a dismissal on the merits for failure to state a claim.

== "Killer Coke" Campaign ==
A few months after the case, on April 16, 2003 Sinaltrainal union members launched the website killercoke.org, which called for the boycott of Coca-Cola.
