= Samheng Boros =

Cambodian politician (born 1981)

His Excellency Samheng Boros
- សំហេង បុរស
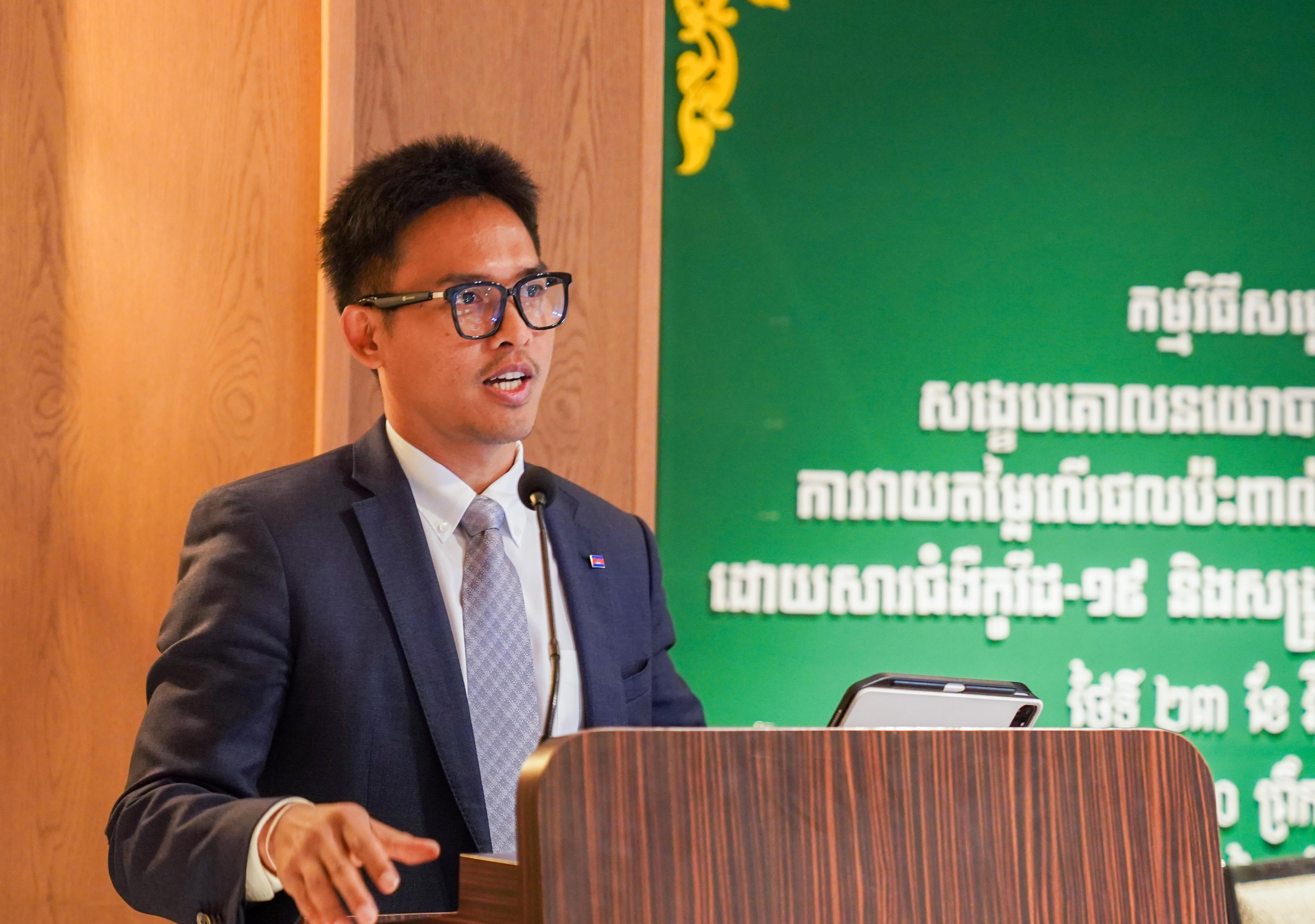
- Samheng Boros in 2022

Minister attached to the Prime Minister
- Monarch: Norodom Sihamoni
- Prime Minister: Hun Manet
- Constituency: Phnom Penh

Personal details
- Born: August 28, 1981 (age 44) Phnom Penh, Cambodia
- Party: Cambodian People's Party
- Spouse: Srun Chhunmolika
- Relations: Samheng Bora (sibling)
- Parent: Ith Samheng (father)
- Website: Samheng Boros - សំហេង បុរស

Samheng Boros (Khmer: សំហេង បុរស) is a Cambodian politician and a Minister attached to the Prime Minister. He previously served as a Secretary of State of Ministry of Social Affairs, Veterans and Youth Rehabilitation (2018–2022). In June 2022, he was appointed as the Minister for the first time in his political career.

== Early life and career ==
Samheng Boros began his first career as a staff at Ministry of Social Affairs Veterans and Youth Rehabilitation (MoSVY) in 2002. He became a General Director of Administration and Finance General Directorate in 2012 and kept promoting as Under Secretary of State (2015–2018). He previously served as to be a Secretary of State at MoSVY (2018–2022).

== Personal life ==
Boros is a son of Ith Samheng, a member of the Cambodian National Assembly. He is a sibling of Samheng Bora, a Secretary of State at the Ministry of Commerce.

For social responsibility, he is a member of Permanent Committee of Union of Youth Federations of Cambodia, which Hun Many is the President of the organization.
