= Building and Wood Workers Trade Union Federation of Cambodia =

Trade union of construction workers in Cambodia

BWTUC
- Predecessor: CCTUF, CFBW
- Founded: 2009
- Location: Cambodia
- Members: 2,250 (2015)
- Key people: Sok Kin, president Yann Thy, general secretary
- Affiliations: CLC

The Building and Wood Workers Trade Union Federation of Cambodia (BWTUC) is a trade union of mainly construction workers in Cambodia. The union was established in 2009 through a merger of two smaller unions and represents 2,250 members in ten local unions, among them restoration workers at Angkor Wat. BWTUC is affiliated with the Cambodian Confederation of Labour and has received funding from Building and Wood Workers International.

== History ==
BWTUC was established in 2001 through a merger of CCTUF and CFBW unions.

In 2013, BWTUC criticised government construction inspectors for being corrupt and not doing their job, leading to unsafe buildings.

In January 2014, BWTUC took part in a protest of 10,000 workers in Phnom Penh, demanding the release of 23 people detained while taking part in garment workers' strikes. They also demanded a minimum monthly wage of $160 for all Cambodian workers.

BWTUC president Sok Kin stated in 2016 that female construction workers only earned half what their male colleagues earned.

Following a meeting between Cambodian Prime Minister Hun Sen and garment workers, BWTUC sent letters to Sen in August and November 2017, calling for a meeting where protections for construction workers could be discussed. While still waiting for a response, the union said that it would send another letter on Human Rights Day. The union also released a survey of more than 1,000 construction workers in Pnhom Penh, which found that 90 percent of the workers were unaware of Cambodia's National Social Security Fund, which would cover medical bills if their employer and they are registered. Only 40 percent of workers said their workplace was safe and relatively injury-free.

In 2019, a protest of BWTUC workers delivered a letter calling for better workplace safety for construction workers, especially their inclusion in the National Social Security Fund. After the deaths of more than 70 construction workers in collapses in 2019, BWTUC together with the Centre for Alliance of Labour and Human Rights called on authorities to ensure better safety standards on construction sites.
