= Farmers Association for Peace and Development =

Trade union for farmers in Cambodia

FAPD
- Founded: 2007
- Headquarters: No. 3G, St. 26BT; 12351 Phnom Penh
- Location: Cambodia
- Members: 1,633 (2015)
- Affiliations: CLC

The Farmers Association for Peace and Development (FAPD) is a trade union of farmers in Cambodia. The union was established in 2007 and has 1,633 members in seven communities. FAPD is affiliated with CLC.
