= Stanisław Lentz =

Artist

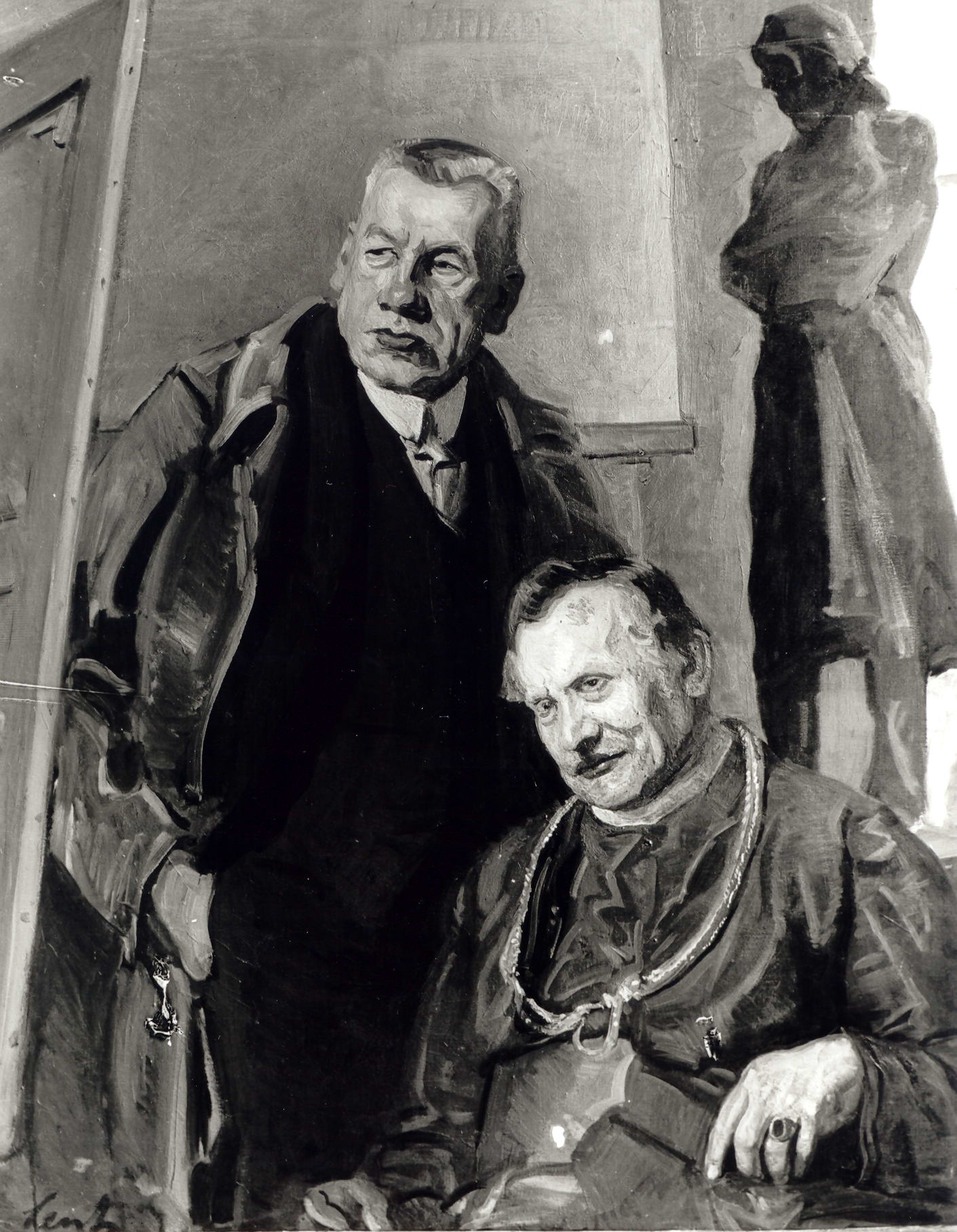
- Stanisław Lentz with the Reverend Mrozowski
- Born: Stanisław Lentz; 23 April 1861; Warsaw, Poland
- Died: 19 October 1920 (aged 59); Warsaw, Poland
- Education: University of Warsaw
- Known for: Painting, portratist, illustrator, professor at Academy of Fine Arts in Warsaw from 1909
- Movement: Realism
- Awards: Strajk (1910)

Stanisław Lentz (April 23, 1861 – October 19, 1920) was a Polish painter, portraitist, illustrator, and a professor at the Academy of Fine Arts in Warsaw from 1909.

== Biography ==
Stanisław Lentz was born in Warsaw, Poland, and studied at the Krakow School of Fine Arts with Feliks Szynalewski and Izydor Jabłoński 1877–1879, then continued his studies in Wojciech Gerson's drawing class in Warsaw. In 1880–1884 he studied abroad at the Academy of Fine Arts in Munich with Alexander von Wagner and Gyula Benczúr, and in 1884–1887 at the Académie Julian in Paris.

After returning to Warsaw he teamed up with magazines. His illustrations were published by:

- Kłosy (1887–1890),
- Tygodnik Ilustrowany (1887–1898, 1905–1906, 1909–1910),
- Kurier Codzienny (1890–1891)

In 1888, he became a member of the Society for the Encouragement of Fine Arts. In 1910 he joined the Society of Polish Artists Sztuka. He traveled frequently abroad: in 1896 he visited Berlin, Paris and Madrid, in 1897 he visited Paris, in 1900 Normandy, in the years 1903 to 1914 (except for 1904) he and his wife spent summers in Scheveningen in the Netherlands.

In 1909, Lentz was appointed professor at the Academy of Fine Arts in Warsaw, while being also the director of this academy. In 1915 he was entrusted with this position for life.

He was buried in Powązki Cemetery in Warsaw.

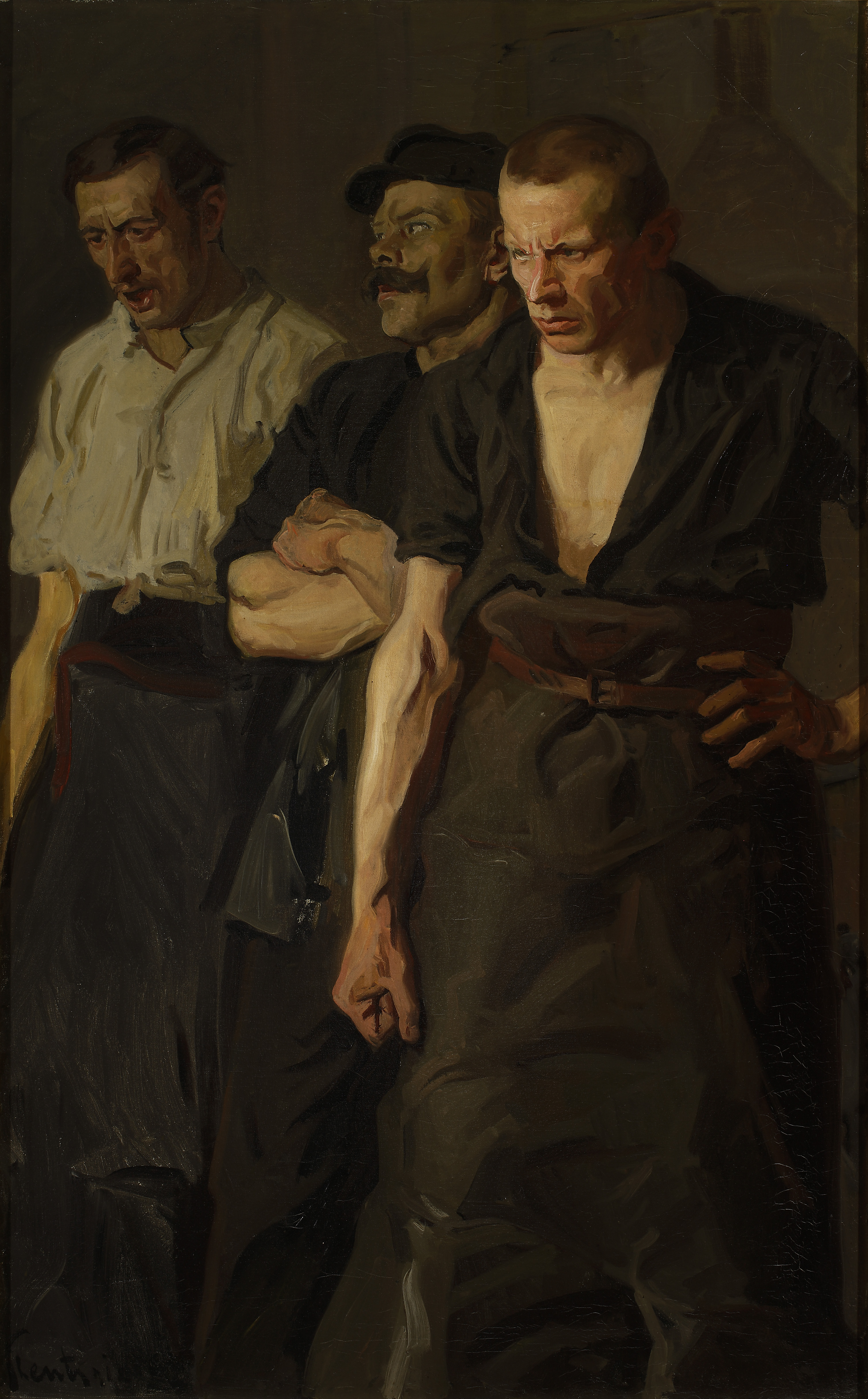
Strajk, 1910

== Exhibitions ==
His works have been exhibited at numerous exhibitions in Poland and abroad (Berlin, Vienna, Munich, Paris, St. Petersburg, London, Antwerp, Venice). Individual artwork exhibitions:

- Society for the Encouragement of Fine Arts (1916, 1917, 1921),
- Institute of Art Propaganda (1933)
- National Museum in Warsaw (1976).

In 1894 he was awarded a silver medal at the exhibition of contemporary art in Lviv for Portret Adolfa Święcickiego (Adolf Święcicki's Portrait). At the Exposition Universelle in 1900 he won the award for the aesthetic qualities of Portret Mieczysława Frenkla (Portrait of Mieczysław Frenkel). The painting Vierzehntak / Wypłata robotnikom (The Workers' Salaries) won third prize in the TZSP painting competition in 1895. For Wilki morskie z Scheveningen (Sea wolves of Scheveningen) he was awarded the second prize in 1904 in the TZSP artwork painting competition.

== Style ==
In the beginning he was under the influence of the Munich school where he had studied; in 1890 he began being influenced by the new colour trends. As a cartoonist he showed daily episodes from the life of the people of Warsaw. Many of his painting scenes displayed Jewish themes, like those in his artworks Przekupień żydowski (Jewish merchant) and Żydzi handlujący starzyzną (Jews dealing junk). Under the influence of the revolutionary events in the Kingdom of Poland in 1905, he was fascinated with the labour movement which became the key subject in his artwork. He was valued for his portraits created in the period 1900–1915, highlighting the blunt characteristics of the model, a synthetic form of the dark monochromatic colours and broad brushstrokes. In 1915 there was a period of fascination with Dutch painting, particularly the work of Frans Hals. In the last period of his creativity he also undertook artworks memorializing the effort of the soldiers of the Polish Legions in World War I fighting for the country's independence.
