= Ith Samheng =

Cambodian politician (born 1954)

His Excellency Dr. Ith Samheng MP
- អុិត សំហេង

Member of the Cambodian National Assembly
- Incumbent
- Assumed office 21 August 2023
- Monarch: Norodom Sihamoni
- President: Khuon Sodary
- Prime Minister: Hun Manet
- Vice President: Cheam Yeab (First VP); Vong Soth (Second VP)
- Constituency: Phnom Penh

Minister of Ministry of Labour and Vocational Training
- In office 24 September 2013 – 22 August 2023
- Prime Minister: Hun Sen
- Preceded by: Ith Samheng
- Succeeded by: Heng Sour

Minister of Ministry of Social Affairs, Veterans and Youth Rehabilitation
- In office 2003 – 23 September 2013
- Prime Minister: Hun Sen
- Preceded by: Suy Sem
- Succeeded by: Vong Soth

Personal details
- Born: 1 August 1954 (age 71) Cambodia
- Party: Cambodian People's Party
- Spouse: Nhep Rany
- Relations: Samheng Boros (Son); Samheng Bora (Son)
- Children: 2
- Website: Ith Samheng

Ith Samheng (Khmer: អុិត សំហេង; born 1 August 1954) is a Cambodian politician and a member of the Cambodian National Assembly. He previously served as a Minister of Ministry of Labour and Vocational Training (2013–2023) and a Minister of Ministry of Social Affairs, Veterans and Youth Rehabilitation (2003-2013) of the Royal Government of Cambodia. In 2003, he was appointed as the Minister for the first time in his political career.

== See also ==
- National Assembly (Cambodia)
- Ministry of Labour and Vocational Training (Cambodia)
- Cabinet of Hun Sen
