= Cambodian Confederation of Unions =

National trade union centre of garment workers in Cambodia

- Founded: 6 August 2006
- Location: Cambodia
- Members: 25,000 - 90,000
- Key people: Rong Chhun, president
- Parent organization: Cambodian Independent Teachers' Association

The Cambodian Confederation of Unions (CCU) is a national trade union centre in Cambodia. The centre is politically tied to the opposition Cambodia National Rescue Party (CNRP) and has been denied official recognition several times in the past. The Cambodian Independent Teachers' Association (CITA) and the Free Trade Union of Workers of the Kingdom of Cambodia (FTUWKC) are affiliated with the centre.

== Political position ==
The CCU is opposed to the government of Hun Sen and is vocal on a wide range of issues, from workers' rights to corruption and national territory. It does not participate in meetings involving government representatives, even if asked to participate. CCU considers itself to be the only true Cambodian trade union centre.

== History ==
The CCU was formed on August 6, 2006. It applied for official recognition, but did not receive it. CCU again applied for official recognition in 2012, but was denied again because some of its affiliated unions represent teachers, which are not protected under Cambodia's Labour Law.

In 2012, during protests against the non-payment of workers' benefits at Tai Yang Enterprises, CCU delivered a protest letter to the US Embassy in Phnom Penh asking Americans to boycott the company's products. Tai Yang at that point was a supplier for Levi's and Gap.

During the 2013–2014 Cambodian protests, CCU workers protested together with CNRP supporters demanding the resignation of the ruling government.

In 2018, the CCU threatened protests if Cambodia's government did not adhere to the EU demand of a political solution between the ruling CPP and the CNRP.

== Affiliates ==
- Cambodian Independent Teachers' Association (CITA)
- Free Trade Union of Workers of the Kingdom of Cambodia (FTUWKC)
- Federation of Cambodian Intellectuals and Students
- Professors Council Association
- Free Trade Union (FTU)
- Cambodian Alliance of Trade Unions (CATU)
