= Coalition of Cambodian Apparel Workers' Democratic Union =

Cambodian trade union

Coalition of Cambodian Apparel Workers' Democratic Union (CCAWDU)
- Formation: 2000
- Headquarters: Phnom Penh, Cambodia
- President: Kong Athit
- Vice-President: Ath Thorn
- Secretary: Heng Chenda
- Treasurer: Ek Sopheakdey
- Parent organization: Cambodian Labour Confederation (CLC)
- Affiliations: IndustriALL; International Trade Union Confederation (ITUC)

The Coalition of Cambodian Apparel Workers' Democratic Union (C.CAWDU) is a Cambodian trade union federation representing workers in the textile and manufacturing sectors. C.CAWDU's current President is Kong Athit, who was re-elected for a second term in August 2023. The federation was formed in 2000 and is affiliated to the Cambodian Labour Confederation, as well as IndustriALL and the International Trade Union Confederation.

== History ==
=== Founding and early organizing attempts ===
C.CAWDU was formed in 2000, its creation facilitated by the Cambodian Labor Organization (CLO), following a dispute between the CLO and the National Independent Federation Textile Union of Cambodia (NIFTUC) - a union itself formed by the CLO in 1999.

C.CAWDU's inaugural president was Chhorn Sokha, making the union one of only two women-led trade union federations in Cambodia at the time. C.CAWDU was well supported by international organizations and rapidly expanded, representing members across 25 factories by 2002. C.CAWDU's initial recruitment efforts were met with fierce resistance at some factories, with instances of union leaders beaten and arrested.

In February 2006, Chhorn Sokha, who by this time was serving as vice president of C.CAWDU, was expelled from the union over allegations that she had accepted a US$2,500 bribe from Minister of Social Affairs, Ith Samheng. Sokha refuted the allegations and described the expulsion as an "act of jealousy" by then-C.CAWDU president Ath Thorn, claiming that Thorn had faked the purportedly incriminating receipts, was jealous of her popularity as a woman leader and was worried about his ability to defeat her in the next union elections. Thorn denied having any jealousy towards Sokha, stating it was not him who had dismissed her, but a committee of the union. Sokha later stated that she believed Thorn had tried to destroy her career, to which he replied by describing her as "dishonest".

=== Continued expansion and industrial action (2006–2013) ===
In late 2006, Ath Thorn was re-elected as President of C.CAWDU. He would go on to hold the position for thirteen years until 2019. The same year, the Cambodian Labor Confederation (CLC) was formed by C.CAWDU, the Cambodian Tourism and Service Workers' Federation (CTSWF), the Independent Democratic Informal Economic Association (IDEA) and the Cambodian Independent Civil Servants' Association (CICA), with Ath Thorn elected as president.

In 2006, C.CAWDU reportedly had a membership of 36,000 workers, which had increased by only 2,000 workers to 38,000 workers by October 2007 in a sector which at the time employed at least 330,000 workers. Attempts at recruitment were obstructed by threats and intimidation against organizers and local trade union leaders, as well as the proliferation of pro-government unions established in factories to create confusion. Expansion efforts were also hampered by the 2008 financial crisis, with at least 90 garment factories closing, another 50 suspending operations and more than 30,000 jobs lost in 2009 alone.

C.CAWDU members participated in a three-day strike involving approximately 200,000 textile workers in September 2010 in response to an announcement that the minimum wage in the garment sector would rise from US$50 to US$61 per month, with unions instead demanding a "living wage" of US$93 per month. The same year, C.CAWDU reported a total of 257 of its trade union leaders had been dismissed or suspended from work.

By June 2011, C.CAWDU's membership had grown to 47,000 workers, with the union's growing size leading to clashes with established pro-government unions at the factory level by 2012. In November 2013, a strike involving C.CAWDU members at SL Garment Processing in Phnom Penh turned violent, resulting in Eng Sokhum, a rice seller nearby the strike, being shot and killed when police opened fire on the striking workers. Nine other protestors and forty-seven police were wounded with another forty protestors, including seven Buddhist monks, arrested.

C.CAWDU members were active participants in the 2013–2014 Cambodian protests, being amongst the first to join rallies led by the Cambodia National Rescue Party which had adopted a policy of raising the monthly minimum wage from US$80 to US$150 per month. In late December 2013, C.CAWDU was amongst seven trade union federations who sent a letter to the Garment Manufacturers' Association of Cambodia (GMAC) threatening a strike of up to 250,000 workers if their demand for a minimum wage of US$160 per month was not met within a week. C.CAWDU was among one of six unions whose members were accused by GMAC of property damage and intimidating other workers into participating in the protests. The union publicly rejected the Cambodian government's announcement to raise the monthly minimum wage to US$100 per month, with president Ath Thorn stating that the union would continue to protest to demand a US$160 per month minimum wage. However, C.CAWDU abandoned its plans for continued wide-scale strikes following the deaths of four protestors on 3 January 2014 who were shot and killed by Cambodian soldiers.

=== Corruption allegations and protests by members (2014–2015) ===
In March 2014, two C.CAWDU organisers, Um Visal and Roeun Chanthan, along with 29 garment workers, filed a complaint with the Phnom Penh Court of First Instance alleging corruption against then-C.CAWDU president, Ath Thorn, then-vice president Kong Athit and then-secretary Ek Sopheakdey. The complaint accused the three C.CAWDU leaders of having stolen US$92,929 from workers as part of a settlement related to an industrial dispute at E-Garment factory in 2007 and 2008. The complainants claimed that the terms of the settlement agreement provided that they were each to receive between US$3,000 and US$4,000 but ultimately only received between US$1,250 and US$2,700 each. The two organisers, Visal and Chanthan, subsequently claimed in a public letter that they were ousted from their positions with C.CAWDU as a result of their investigating corruption within the organisation and amongst its leadership.

Several weeks later, the Phnom Penh Court of First Instance summoned Thorn, Athit and Sopheakdey for questioning over the embezzlement claims. Whilst the three leaders denied having embezzled the money, Um Visal held a press conference calling on them to resign from their positions. Visal and Chanthan later sought an injunction to force Thorn to step down as C.CAWDU president while under investigation for embezzlement, however this request was rejected by the court.

The impacts of these corruption scandals on C.CAWDU was significant, with international donors such as Transparency International deciding to freeze grants and projects with C.CAWDU in light of the allegations. Nevertheless, Ath Thorn, Kong Athit and Ek Sopheakdey continued in their positions and remain C.CAWDU leaders to the present day.

In March 2015, C.CAWDU was hit with further embezzlement allegations when dozens of former workers from Chang Sheng Garment factory protested in front of the union's office. The workers claimed that money owed to them by the factory following a fire there in 2014 was given to the union, which had failed to then provide it to the workers. Sorn Prak, Secretary-General of the Workers' Union Federation, who led the protest, said that "C.CAWDU must be responsible for the payment because they received the money from the factory owner to pay the workers."

=== Recent history (2016–present) ===
Membership growth and overall activity has been somewhat stagnant for C.CAWDU following both the corruption allegations of 2014-15 and the passage of the Law on Trade Unions in 2016 which significantly restricted the ability for trade unions in Cambodia to recruit members and establish a presence in new workplaces. Peaking at more than 73,000 members in 2015, C.CAWDU's membership has since fallen to around 50,000 with the union particularly failing to replace members lost during mass layoffs that occurred during the COVID-19 pandemic, despite continuing to receive high levels of external, international funding.
