= Sindicato Nacional de Trabajadores de la Industria de Alimentos =

The National Union of Food Industry Workers (Spanish: Sindicato Nacional de Trabajadores de la Industria de Alimentos, SINALTRAINAL) is a Colombian food industry trade union.

The group has repeatedly tried to form unions in Colombia for workers of Panamco, a Colombian Coca-Cola bottling company, and have documentation of many members or leaders being murdered, kidnapped, and tortured by right-wing paramilitary groups such as the AUC in order to prevent unionization.

== See also ==
- Sinaltrainal v. Coca-Cola
- Trade unions in Colombia
- Ministry of Labour (Colombia)

== Notes ==
- Amnesty International (AI) report 27 August 2003 - fear for safety of SINALTRAINAL vice-president Juan Carlos Galvis
- AI report 23 September 2005 - fear for safety of SINALTRAINAL member José Onofre Esquivel Luna
