= Cheang Thida =

Cambodian trade unionist

Cheang Thida was President of the Cambodian Alliance of Trade Unions (CATU)-affiliated local trade union at Kin Tai Garment Factory before its closure in 2015.

== Biography ==
Cheang Thida was among 11 trade union leaders detained by police on January 21, 2014, during the 2013–2014 Cambodian protests, while trying to deliver a letter to the US embassy in Phnom Penh. According to the Community Legal Education Center, she was detained because she had been "instrumental in leading 10,000 workers on strike in a major garment district, Chak Angre Krom." The detained leaders were released on the same day after signing a letter in which they promised not to participate in further demonstrations. The International Federation for Human Rights expressed its concern over the arrests.
