= Rong Chhun =

Cambodian trade unionist and political activist

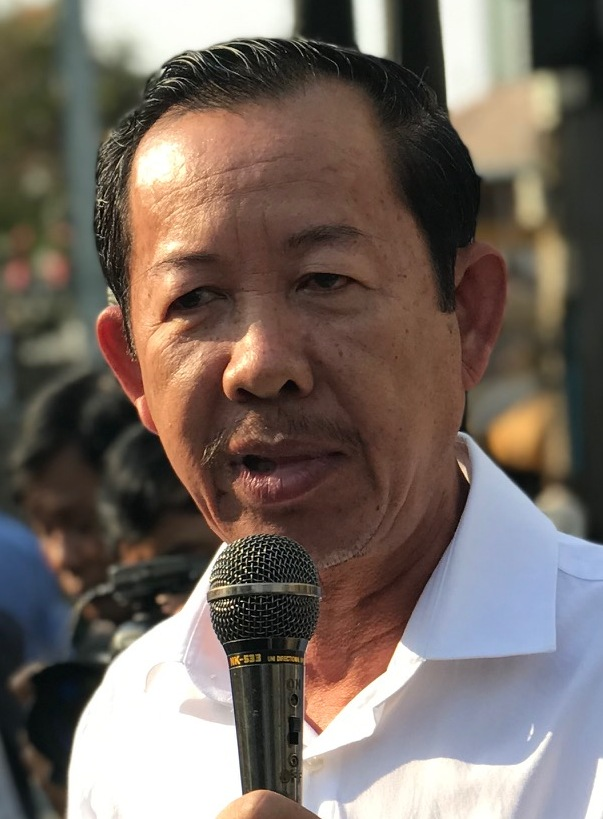
- Chhun in 2020

President of the Cambodian Confederation of Unions (CCU)
- In office 6 August 2006 – 11 April 2015
- Incumbent
- Assumed office 20 November 2017

President of the Cambodian Independent Teachers' Association
- In office March 2000 – 11 April 2015

Opposition member of the National Election Committee of Cambodia
- Resigned
- In office 11 April 2015 – 20 November 2017

Personal details
- Born: 1969 (age 56–57) Talon commune, Kandal Province
- Pronunciation of Rong Chhun

Rong Chhun (born 1969 in Talon, Kandal) is a Cambodian trade unionist and political activist. He is the president of the Cambodian Confederation of Unions and has been imprisoned several times for his work.

== Biography ==
Chhun was born in Talon commune, Kandal Province, in 1969, as the fourth of five siblings. In 1993, he graduated from the Royal University of Phnom Penh with a bachelor's degree in mathematics. He then began teaching at a high school in Talon. He formed the Cambodian Independent Teachers' Association (CITA) in March 2000, together with more than 30 other teachers, to organise for better pay and more rights.

Chhun was detained on October 15, 2005, in Banteay Meanchey Province. He was charged with defamation of the Prime Minister in statements concerning a border agreement with Vietnam signed on October 12, 2005, and held without trial in Prey Sar prison until January 2006, when he was released on bail.

In 2010, Chhun voiced concern over a planned law on trade unions, especially over unions being required to report their financial situation to the government every year and union leaders being legally responsible if strikes turned violent.

In 2012, he was summoned for questioning at Kandal Provincial Court after allegations that he had incited the employees of Tai Yang garment factory to illegal protests.

During the 2013–2014 Cambodian protests, Chhun led the first strike of around 300,000 garment workers that protested together with members of the opposition party Cambodia National Rescue Party (CNRP) in Phnom Penh. After the violent crackdown on the protests, Chhun was summoned for questioning together with Sam Rainsy and Kem Sokha. 5,000 people protested in front of the court building in their support. On January 21, Chhun was briefly arrested together with ten other activists. In November, he was, together with Yang Sophorn of the Cambodian Alliance of Trade Unions, prohibited from meeting other union leaders or attending demonstrations by Phnom Penh Municipal Court.

Chhun joined the newly formed National Election Committee of Cambodia in 2015 as a CNRP member under a deal to end CNRP's year-long boycott of parliament. During his time on the commission, he faced prosecution under charges of "intential violence" from 2014 which Human Rights Watch called "baseless". He resigned from his position after two years, protesting against the CNRP's dissolution and laws distributing its parliamentary seats to other minor parties. When he then tried to return to his post in the Ministry of Education in January 2018, he was told he had been fired for being absent without permission. Chhun said he had been under an agreement for leave without pay for his position in the NEC and called the dismissal politically motivated. He then rejoined CITA as a consultant in the same month.

On July 31, 2020, Chhun was again arrested for allegedly saying that Cambodia had ceded land on its border to Vietnam. The arrest was condemned by Cambodian civil society groups, several global union federations and human rights organisations, and the United Nations. Chhun's trial began on January 15, 2021, observed by several diplomats and a representative of the UN High Commissioner for Human Rights. On November 12, 2021, he was released from prison after the Court of Appeal suspended part of his sentence.

On 5 May 2025, Chhun, who was by then a leading advisor to the opposition Nation Power Party, was convicted on charges of incitement and sentenced to four years' imprisonment. On 19 June 2026, the Supreme Court upheld the incitement conviction but suspended the remainder of his sentence, consequently banning him from politics for five years and from travel abroad for three years. Chhun said he would look into the possibility of asking for royal pardon.
