= 2012 Bavet shooting =

- Location: Bavet Municipality, Svay Rieng Province, Cambodia
- Date: 20 February 2012
- Target: Striking garment workers
- Weapon: pistol
- Injuries: 3
- Perpetrator: Chhouk Bandith

The 2012 Bavet shooting was the shooting of three striking garment workers, Keo Near, Buot Chinda and Nuth Sakhorn, in Bavet, Svay Rieng, Cambodia, by then-town governor Chhouk Bandith on February 20, 2012. The shooting and the following court cases received national attention in Cambodia and have been characterised as highlighting the "culture of impunity among Cambodian officials implicated in scandals and the reluctance of Cambodian courts to find justice for the victims of attacks on labour activists."

== Shooting ==
In February 2012, thousands of workers were protesting for a pay raise and better working conditions in Manhattan Economic Zone in Bavet, Svay Rieng. Police used tear gas against some of the strikes, and on February 20, workers arriving for work at Kaoway Sports factory, a supplier of Puma, found the factory closed and guarded by police. The police told the workers they were there on the orders of city governor Chhouk Bandith. Throughout the morning, additional workers kept arriving, and around 7:55 am police notified Bandith.

Bandith was driven from his residence nearby to the scene and arrived around 8:00 am. Apparently noticing a group of workers attempting to destroy several video cameras, he shouted at the workers to stop and made their way towards them through the crowd. Once he arrived within a few meters of them, witnesses reported him drawing a gun from his waist and opening fire at the crowd. He hit Buot Chinda in the chest, piercing her lung, Nuth Sakhorn in the back and Keo Near in the arm. Witnesses also reported that Bandith attempted to further shoot his gun, but that a technical malfunction prevented him from doing so.

Bandith then fled and escaped a group of workers pursuing him while Near, Sakhorn and Chinda were taken to a hospital.

== Criminal proceedings ==
=== First case ===
Bandith went back to work before Near, Sakhorn and Chinda were released from hospital. All three also said town officials had tried to buy their silence, offering them between $500 and $1,000 if they did not press charges. Near, Sakhorn and Chinda all filed complaints against Bandith, demanding $45,000 in compensation.

Bandith was publicly named as suspect by Interior Minister Sar Kheng on March 1, 2012. His removal as town governor, in order to prevent him from influencing the ongoing trial, was announced on March 8. However, with the same decree, he was also given an unspecified position in the Svay Rieng province administration.

On March 15, Bandith was summoned for questioning to Svay Rieng provincial court. There, he confessed to the shooting, but was afterwards let go. "He confessed to the shooting but he gave me many for reasons for that", the Provincial Prosecutor said. "It is my right not to arrest [him]. I don't see it as important." Government officials meanwhile said the decision of arresting a suspect was up to the court. On the same day, numerous trade unions and civil society organisations called for Bandith's arrest.

Still, on April 19, charges were filed against Bandith. On May 14, the prosecutor announced that Bandith "had not intended to injure the three women" and he would therefore be charged with the misdemeanour offence of "causing injury without intent". Meanwhile, the workers' lawyers said Special Economic Zone personnel did not allow them to collect evidence at the crime scene.

In August, the chief of penal police in Bavet was also put under court supervision on the same charges as Bandith. He was finally convicted of the illegal use of a weapon, fined and sentenced to six months' imprisonment.

On December 18, the case against Bandith was dropped without explanation. This was swiftly condemned by the Cambodian Center for Human Rights and Human Rights Watch. Government officials again said the decision was in the hands of the court.

=== Second case ===
After a public outcry, the Court of Appeals announced it would take on the case on January 2, 2013. On March 4, Bandith was charged again and the case sent back to Svay Rieng Provicinal Court. The case was repeatedly delayed because neither Bandith nor his lawyers appeared for the proceedings.

The verdict of the second case was announced on June 25. Bandith was convicted of "causing unintentional bodily harm" and sentenced to a fine and one and a half years in prison. Cambodian civil rights organisations, including Licadho and ADHOC, protested against this light sentence. The latter also said the sentence meant little as long as Bandith remained at large. The court also, for the first time, ordered Bandith's arrest, but Bandith remained at large. He still managed to appeal his conviction.

== Imprisonment in 2015 and aftermath ==
Bandith remained at large from 2013 to 2015. In March 2015, Interpol issued a red notice for him. In July 2015 Near, Chinda and Sakhorn petitioned parliament regarding the case, saying they were living in fear of Bandith's retribution and that they were still not able to work again full time. On August 3, Cambodian Prime Minister Hun Sen publicly called for Bandith's arrest after years of silence on the matter. Days later, on August 8, 2015, Bandith turned himself in to police and began his prison term in Svay Rieng Provincial Prison on the same day. The arrest was praised by trade unions including C.CAWDU.

According to NGO reports, Bandith enjoyed preferential treatment in prison and was allowed considerably more freedom than other inmates. He had also not paid the $9,279 he was ordered to pay to Near, Chinda and Sakhorn as compensation. He finished his 18-month jail term on February 8, 2017. On July 23, 2020, Phnom Penh Appeal Court announced it had ruled in favour of Bandith's rehabilitation, nullifying any remaining part of his sentence. It was unclear whether this meant he would be reinstated into his former position as governor of Bavet.
