= Chea Vichea =

- ជា វិជ្ជា
- Born: Early 1960s Kandal, Cambodia
- Died: January 22, 2004; Phnom Penh, Cambodia
- Cause of death: Assassinated
- Occupation: Leader of the Free Trade Union of Workers of the Kingdom of Cambodia
- Known for: 2004 Assassination
- Political party: Sam Rainsy Party

Chea Vichea (Khmer: ជា វិជ្ជា) was the leader of the Free Trade Union of Workers of the Kingdom of Cambodia (FTUWKC) until his assassination on Chinese New Year, 22 January 2004. Following his death, he was succeeded in his position at the FTUWKC by his younger brother Chea Mony.

Vichea was shot in the head and chest early in the morning while reading a newspaper at a kiosk in Daun Penh district, Phnom Penh. He had recently been dismissed by the INSM Garment Factory (located in the Chum Chao District of Phnom Penh) as a reprisal for helping to establish a trade union at the company. He also had close affiliations with the opposition Sam Rainsy Party.

== Investigation ==
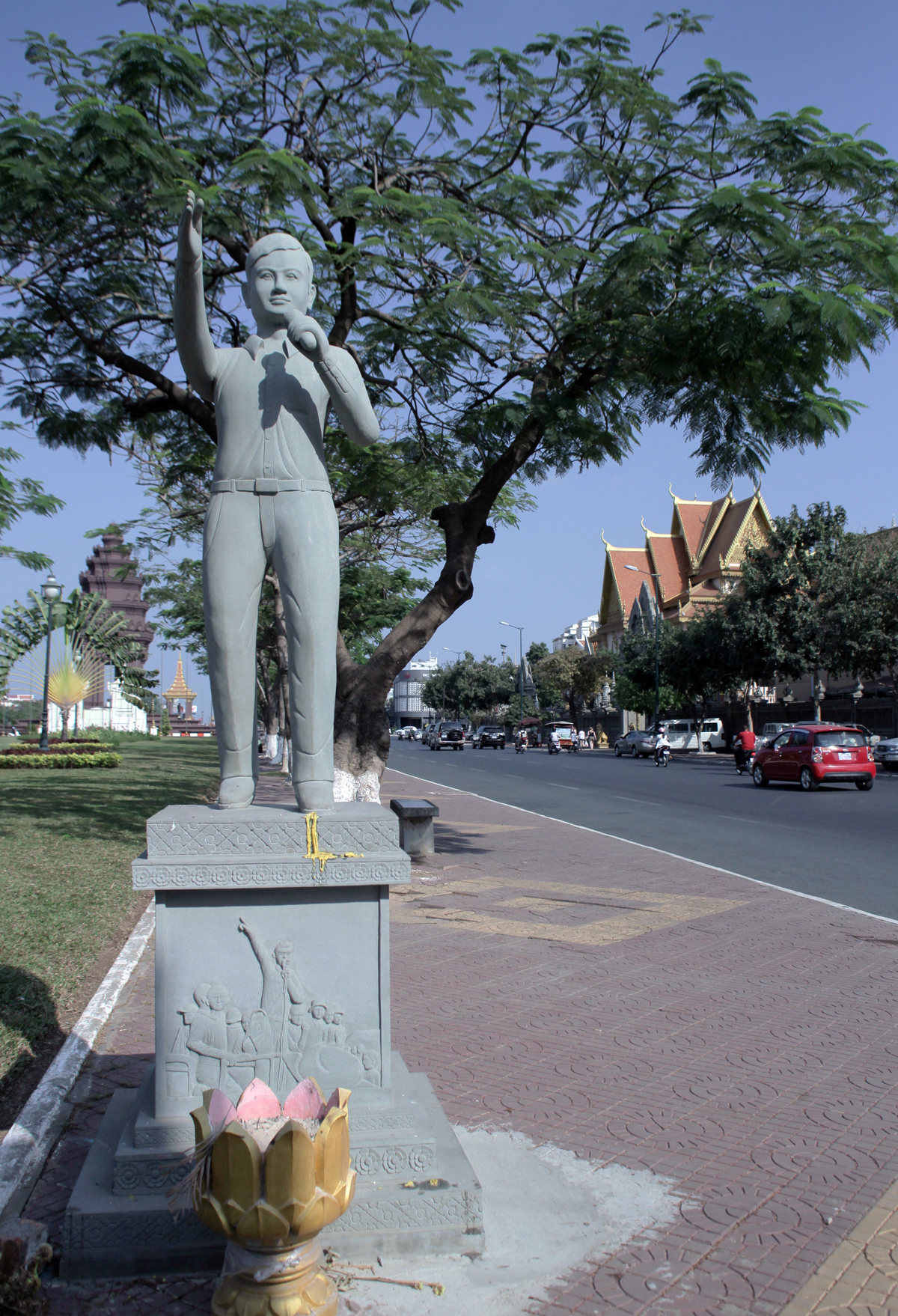
Chea Vichea's monument in Phnom Penh, Sihanouk Blvd, statue

A few days after Vichea's killing, and facing mounting criticism for their failure to act, Cambodian authorities arrested two men and charged them with the murder.

The first, Born Samnang, was arrested in Prey Veng Province and transferred to Phnom Penh overnight. He initially admitted to the killing but then publicly retracted, claiming to have been tortured into confessing. Multiple eyewitnesses have placed Samnang in a different part of the country at the time of the murder.

The second suspect, Sok Sam Oeun, has consistently denied any involvement and also has alibis placing him in a party with friends at the time of the murder.

The criminal investigation was done by Phnom Penh's Tuol Kork district police and plagued by irregularities. Officers focused on threatening and rounding up those who provided alibis for the suspects, while witnesses were intimidated.'

On 22 March 2004, the case's Investigating Judge, Hing Thirith, threw out the charges against the two men, citing a lack of evidence against them and weak credibility of the police investigation . The next day, Hing Thirith was removed from his position at the Phnom Penh Municipal Court, and his decision to drop charges was subsequently overturned on 1 June 2004 by the Appeals Court Presiding Judge Thou Mony .

The trial took place more than a year after the murder while Samnang and Sam Oeun remained in custody in Phnom Penh, despite a Cambodian legal limitation that no one be detained without trial for longer than six months. The case has been taken up by both national and international organisations, including Amnesty International, Human Rights Watch and ILO.

== Trial ==
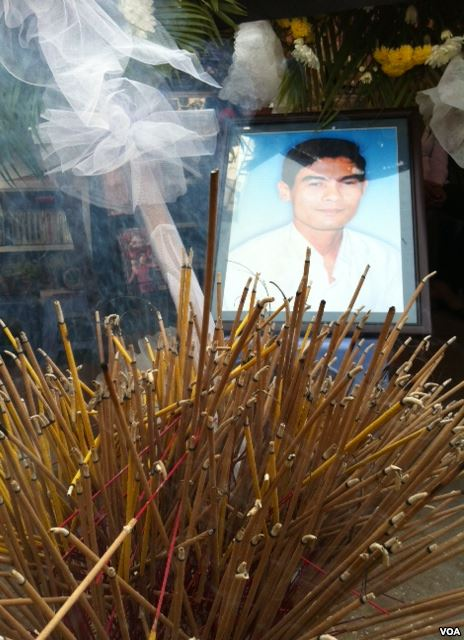
A 10th anniversary memorial service was held for Chea Vichea on January 22, 2014, arranged by garment workers and joined by the opposition.

On 1 August 2005, the Phnom Penh Municipal Courts delivered a judgment highly criticized by both local and international organizations, who deemed it unfair and politically biased rather than based on independent and reasonable judgment.

Sok Sam Oeun and Born Samnang were judged guilty after a trial where no witnesses testified against the accused and no forensic evidence was brought to court. Both individuals were sentenced to 20 years in prison and ordered to pay $5,000 compensation each to the family of the victim.

Vichea's family turned down the compensation, stating that they did not believe the two convicted were the real murderers.

Sam Oeun and Samnang were released in September 2013. The actual murderers' identities remain unknown.
