= General Confederation of Democratic Workers =

Labor Federation in Colombia

CGTD
- General Confederation of Democratic Workers
- Confederación General de Trabajadores Democráticos
- Founded: 1988
- Headquarters: Bogotá, Colombia
- Location: Colombia
- Key people: Mario de J. Valderrama, president Roberto Gomez Esguerra, general secretary
- Affiliations: ITUC
- Website: https://cgtcolombia.co/

The General Confederation of Democratic Workers (Confederación General de Trabajadores Democráticos de Colombia, CGTD) is a federation of trade unions in Colombia. It was founded in 1988. The CGTD is affiliated with the International Trade Union Confederation.
