= Free Trade Union of Workers of the Kingdom of Cambodia =

FTUWKC
- Free Trade Union of Workers of the Kingdom of Cambodia
- Founded: December 1996
- Location: Cambodia
- Members: 60,000
- Key people: President: Mr. Chea Mony Secretary General : Mr. Mann Seng Hak
- Website: www.ftuwkc.org

The Free Trade Union of Workers of the Kingdom of Cambodia (FTUWKC) is a trade union in Cambodia. It was founded in December, 1996. ICTUR reports that the largest activities of the FTUWKC are in the garment industry.

Chea Vichea, president of the FTUWKC, was murdered in January, 2004.
