= Panamco =

Beverage company

Panamerican Beverages, Inc. (Panamco) was an Americas beverage company. It was the largest Coca-Cola bottler in Latin America. It was founded in 1941 in Mexico. The company was headquartered in Panama City, but later in 2000 moved to Miami and operated in eight Latin American countries, including Mexico, Brazil, Colombia, Venezuela, Costa Rica, Nicaragua, Guatemala and Panama. It merged with Coca-Cola FEMSA effective May 6, 2003. Prior to the merger, Panamco was 25% owned by The Coca-Cola Company.

== Criticism ==
Panamco has been criticized for its relationship with unions. In Colombia, it has been alleged that the bottling company hired paramilitary mercenaries to assassinate union leaders. These charges have resulted in several court cases and boycott actions against The Coca-Cola Company.
