= Ministry of Labour and Vocational Training (Cambodia) =

Government ministry of Cambodia

- ក្រសួងការងារនិងបណ្តុះបណ្តាលវិជ្ជាជីវៈ
- Emblem of Ministry of Labour and Vocational Training

Agency overview
- Formed: 1993
- Jurisdiction: Royal Government of Cambodia
- Headquarters: Phnom Penh, Cambodia
- Minister responsible: Heng Sour, Minister of Labour and Vocational Training
- Website: mlvt.gov.kh t.me/HENG_Sour t.me/molvtkhmer t.me/UYFCMLVT

The Ministry of Labour and Vocational Training (Khmer: ក្រសួងការងារនិងបណ្តុះបណ្តាលវិជ្ជាជីវៈ) is a government ministry of Cambodia. Established in 1993, it shoulders the responsibility of labour, workforce, and vocational education. As of current date, the ministry is under the leadership of Minister Heng Sour.
