= 2013–2014 Cambodian protests =

Cambodian anti-government protests in 2013 and 2014

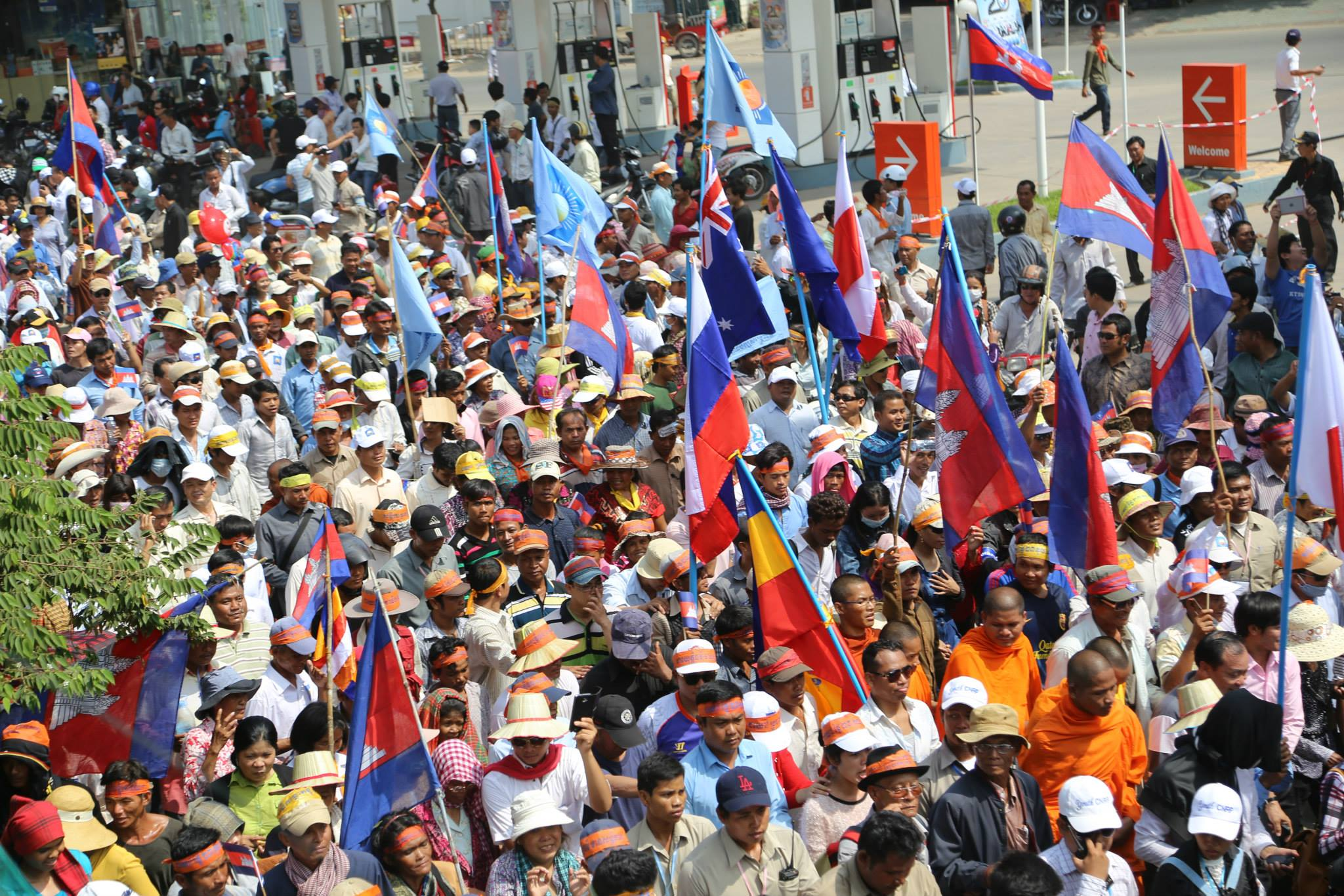
- Protesters and opposition supporters marching
- Date: 28 July 2013 – 22 July 2014 (11 months, 3 weeks and 3 days)
- Location: Phnom Penh, Cambodia
- Caused by: Electoral fraud, political corruption, illegal logging and human rights violations
- Goals: Democracy, electoral reform, snap election and returning of republicanism
- Methods: Demonstrations, civil disobedience and internet activism

Parties
| Opposition: Cambodia National Rescue Party; Beehive Radio; Khmers Kampuchea-Krom Federation; Various other groups (incl. students, teachers, Muslims, farmers, labor unions, and Buddhist monks); Independent Monk Network for Social Justice; Cambodian Independent Teachers Association | Government: Cambodian People's Party; National Election Committee; Royal Gendarmerie of Cambodia |

Lead figures
| Sam Rainsy; Kem Sokha; Mu Sochua; Yim Sovann; Mam Sonando; Rong Chhun; But Buntenh | Hun Sen; Sar Kheng; Pa Socheatvong; Keo Remy; Im Suosdey |

Number
| est. 100,000-500,000 | |

Casualties and losses
| 4 deaths 27 injured | 8 injured |

Casualties
- Arrested: 17
- Detained: 6

Anti-government protests (Khmer: បាតុកម្មប្រឆាំងរាជរដ្ឋាភិបាល) took place in Cambodia from July 2013 to July 2014. Popular demonstrations in Phnom Penh took place against the government of Prime Minister Hun Sen, triggered by widespread allegations of electoral fraud during the 2013 general election. Demands to raise the minimum wage to $160 a month and resentment at Vietnamese influence in Cambodia have also contributed to the protests. The main opposition party refused to participate in parliament after the elections, and major demonstrations took place throughout December 2013. A government crackdown in January 2014 led to the deaths of 4 people and the clearing of the main protest camp.

Cambodian protests may have been partly precipitated by the perception of corruption, lack of freedom and poor quality of life in the country. Cambodia is near the bottom of international rankings in the measurement of those factors. Inequality in the distribution of wealth is a recognized problem, as is the statistic that a third of children are malnourished, and the difficulty that government critics are rounded up and detained on dubious charges.

Cambodia's strongman Hun Sen has affirmed his 'pre-eminence' by closing Freedom Park, an opposition protest site in central Phnom Penh that is now strictly off limits to the public and appears to be like a 'fortified military base'. Cambodians are 'riled by incessant land grabs, official corruption and labor disputes in a country tightly controlled by one man for nearly three decades.' Freedom Park, is closed now indefinitely. Protests have now "fizzled out after a crackdown on factory strikes in January that killed at least four people and alarmed major clothing brands with interests in Cambodia, like Adidas, Nike and Gap. "Since then, anti-government protests intended to draw hundreds of thousands of people have attracted just a few hundred. Freedom Park was shut down in April. "In general, people I've seen and talked to in villages, just want change of national leadership," said Kem Ley, an independent political analyst. "But what the CNRP has been doing is the same thing, again and again," Ley said, referring to the calls for protests. "People are just tired and afraid because of the government's shameless use of violence."

== Garment workers ==
Most of the protesters were women working in garment factories as they strongly believed the wages paid are unacceptable. The workers were demanding for higher wages and better working conditions such as basic health care, protection etc. There are approximately 700,000 workers in the garment sector with 90% of the workers are female. The female are not only protesting from a workers' perspective, but also from the role of women as gender inequality is a huge issue in Cambodia. Cambodian women workers play a huge role in supporting the economy for Cambodia at 67.72% of the GDP is from exports of goods and services and 87% are manufactured goods.

== Background ==
=== 2013 general election ===
There are so many irregularities [with the election] that were exposed even before voting day. We know that this was a foregone conclusion; that the ruling party organised the election in such a way as to secure victory even before voting day.

— Sam Rainsy, leader of CNRP

On 28 July 2013 general elections were held in Cambodia, with the ruling Cambodian People's Party (CPP) claiming victory with 68 seats. The Cambodia National Rescue Party (CNRP), the main opposition party with 55 seats, rejected the results and boycotted the opening of parliament, claiming there had been irregularities with the voting. The E.U. and U.S. also expressed concern about possible fraud, and the international non-governmental organisation Human Rights Watch called for an 'independent commission' to investigate allegations of election fraud. The opposition party organised large protests in Phnom Penh during December, including motorbike rallies. The government called the protests illegal and stated that they were 'inciting anarchy'.

=== Historical and economic resentment ===
The protest also had the aim against Vietnam, in part due to historical role of Vietnam in Cambodian affairs. Vietnamese influence began to spread to Cambodia at the 13th century, but it did not come directly until 19th century. However, Vietnam has begun to intervene to Cambodia since 17th century, notably with the overthrown of Cambodia's only Muslim ruler, Ramathipadi I. Continuing Vietnamese influence also met with strong Siamese response, but in 19th century, Vietnam finally consolidated influence in Cambodia and annexed entire of Mekong Delta. Attempt by Vietnam to assimilate Khmers into the country often met with strong hostility, but Vietnamese influence continued to remain in Cambodia, even during the French colonization. Then, in 1949, French President Vincent Auriol confirmed Mekong Delta to be part of Vietnam, and this was the source for eventual tensions.

In 20th century, both Vietnamese and Cambodian nationalists cooperated together to overthrow the French rule, however the Cambodian nationalists were distrustful of Vietnamese counterparts, thinking that it was an attempt by Vietnam to create the greater Indochina under Vietnamese influence. This led to eventual hostility launched by Lon Nol and Pol Pot, with the latter being the most severe one due to his open hatred on Vietnam. Khmer Krom nationalists also sought to free Mekong Delta from Vietnamese influence, complicated with the ongoing Vietnam War. Following the defeat of South Vietnam at 1975, the communist movements in both two countries dominated political affairs, but the Khmer Rouge and Vietnamese communists became increasingly hostile to each other, leading to the Cambodian–Vietnamese War in which Vietnam occupied Cambodia for ten years. For this reason, the fear against Vietnam is permanent in Cambodia.

Similar to historical reason, economics is also another reason. Since the demise of Khmer Empire, Vietnam has been economically dominant. Even when both countries were equally destroyed by the end of Vietnam War, but Vietnamese reforms of 1986 quickly redeveloped the country. As for the result, the Vietnamese economy became increasingly globalized and expands, thus has reasserted its dominance in Cambodia, and Vietnamese economic domination often brought resentment to Cambodians, who always thought Vietnam to be the sin of Cambodian nation. Culturally, Vietnam also has a greater reputation and is increasingly more open, while Cambodia has fluctuated over the Khmer Empire's historical pride and economic inferiority, and the lack of cultural common between two countries, since Cambodia is an Indianized nation while Vietnam is part of the Sinosphere, further escalated the hostility.

== Protests and violence ==
On Friday 3 January, military police fired at protesting garment workers on Veng Sreng Street, Por Senchey District, in the outskirts on Phnom Penh, killing at least 4 people and injuring more than 20. The protesters blocked the road and had thrown bottles and rocks at the police in retaliation for violence towards other protesters and priests earlier during the day. The workers were on strike over the government's refusal to raise the minimum wage to $160 a month.

There was also violence towards Vietnamese Cambodians by protesters, leading to the destruction of a Vietnamese-owned coffee shop.

Just days before the crackdown took place, Prime Minister Hun Sen made a state visit to the Socialist Republic of Vietnam. The opposition has accused the premier of seeking military aid from Vietnam. CNRP Vice President Kem Sokha said Hun Sen might use the trip to seek Vietnam's support to hold on to power, adding that the premier should discuss the country's problems with Cambodians instead of foreign leaders.

On Saturday 4 January, Cambodian authorities entered the main protest camp and used violence to disperse protesters. Further protests were also banned. Opposition leaders were summoned to the Phnom Penh Municipal Court for questioning for having allegedly incited striking workers to 'disrupt social order'.

In February 2014, the ban on demonstrations was lifted but Prime Minister Hun Sen warned that any future anti-government demonstrations by the opposition party would be met by rallies of his own supporters.

On 8 July 2014, protesters gathered in front of the Vietnamese embassy in Phnom Penh to protest against the disputed Khmer Krom territory loss to Vietnam in 1949 and calling for Vietnam to apologize. The embassy issued a statement on 9 July, calling for Cambodia to respect Vietnam's sovereignty and independence and refused to apologize. The protest was later dispersed by local authorities, leaving 10 injured.

On 15 July 2014, approximately 200 opposition protesters marched at Phnom Penh's Freedom Park when another violence erupted, only with the tables turned. This time, Daun Penh District security forces were beaten severely by protesters, resulting in at least 8 guards injured. The hospitalized security guards called for justice and condemned the opposition for the violence. Six opposition MPs-elect were arrested, including protest leader Mu Sochua. On 17 July, CNRP vice president Kem Sokha was summoned to the Phnom Penh Municipal Court. On 19 July, opposition leader Sam Rainsy returned to Cambodia from his month-long trip to Europe due to the political crisis. He met with prime minister Hun Sen on 22 July, where the CNRP agreed to enter parliament, ending the longest political crisis in Cambodian history.

== Aftermath and agreement ==
The Cambodia National Rescue Party agreed to enter parliament after meeting with government officials at the Senate Palace on 22 July 2014. An agreement was signed between both sides to share leadership roles in the National Assembly. The seat of the First Vice President of the National Assembly will be held by a member from the CNRP, and the Second Vice President of the National Assembly will be held by a member from the CPP. The opposition will also chair 5 of the 10 commissions, including the newly established Anti-Corruption Commission. In addition, Sam Rainsy, who was barred from running in the election, was accepted as Member of Parliament. Opposition MPs were then sworn in at the Royal Palace on 5 August 2014.

== International reactions ==
The United Nations and U.S. State Department have condemned the violence. U.S. Congressman Ed Royce called for Prime Minister Hun Sen to step down, saying 'It's time for Hun Sen to end his three-decade grip on power and step down'. In front of the White House, more than 500 Cambodian Americans gather to stage protest, seeking aid from the United States government. They have also demanded the release of the 23 imprisoned on January 3 during the police crackdown. UN rights envoy to Cambodia Surya Subedi visited Cambodia and met with Prime Minister Hun Sen.

On 29 January, opposition leader Sam Rainsy went to Geneva where the UN Human Rights Council was reviewing Cambodia's rights record during the second cycle of the Universal Periodic Review of Cambodia.

The European Union, Australia, Germany, Poland, Japan, and Thailand have all expressed concerns and worries about human rights in Cambodia. Human Rights Watch called for UN to pressure the Cambodian government.

== Gallery ==
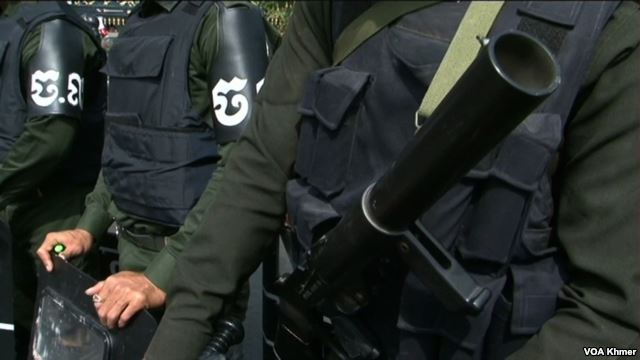
Armed Cambodian riot police. The violence was the worst in Cambodia since crackdowns on protests after 1998 elections.

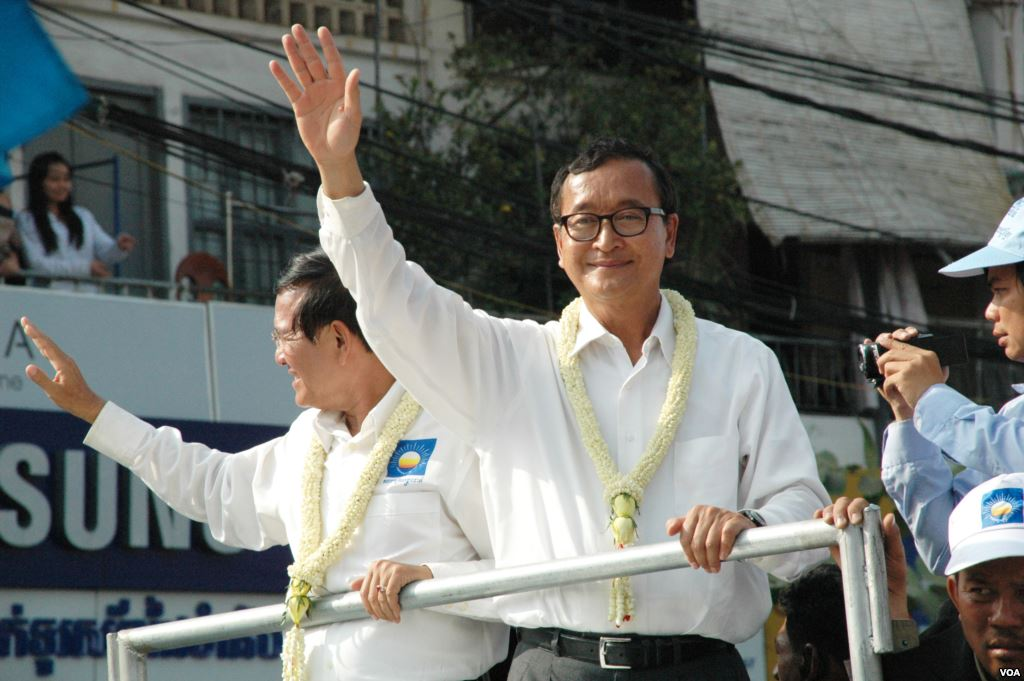
CNRP President Sam Rainsy and Vice President Kem Sokha wave to protesters during a demonstration in December 2013.

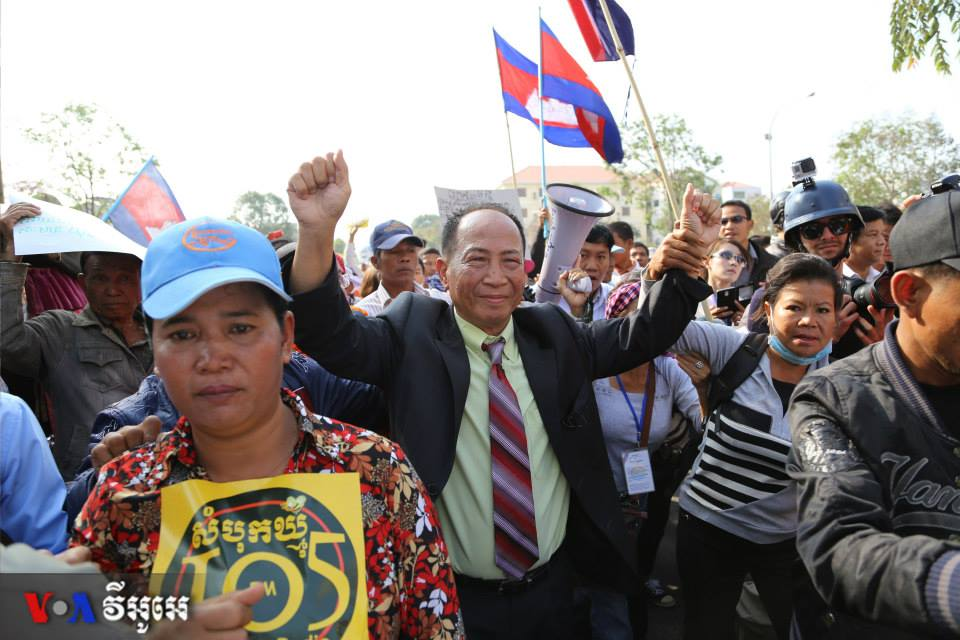
Beehive Radio journalist Mam Sonando leads a demonstration at the Ministry of Information, in January 2014.

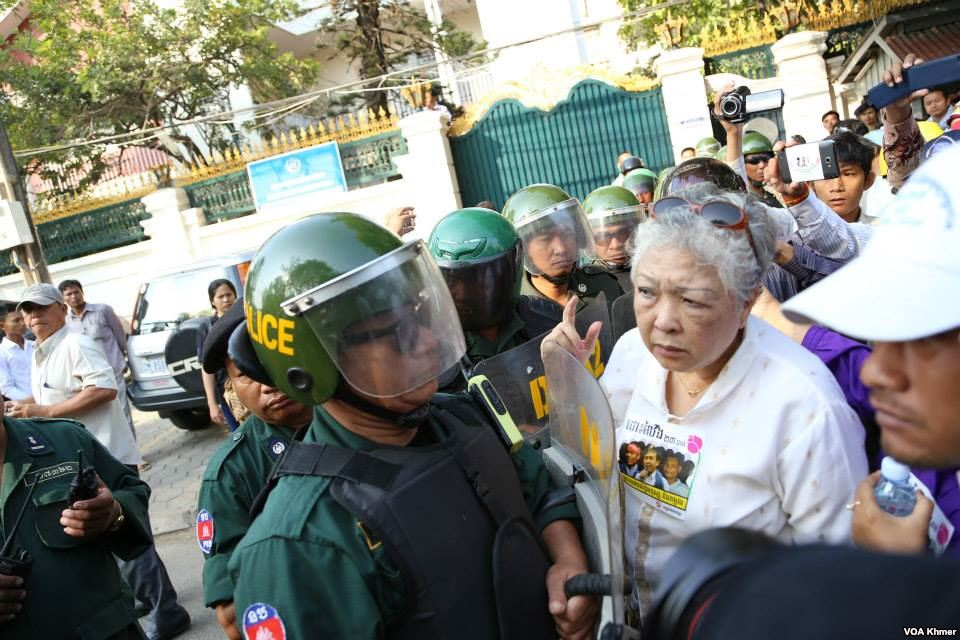
Riot police block a protest by civil societies and NGOs in Phnom Penh.

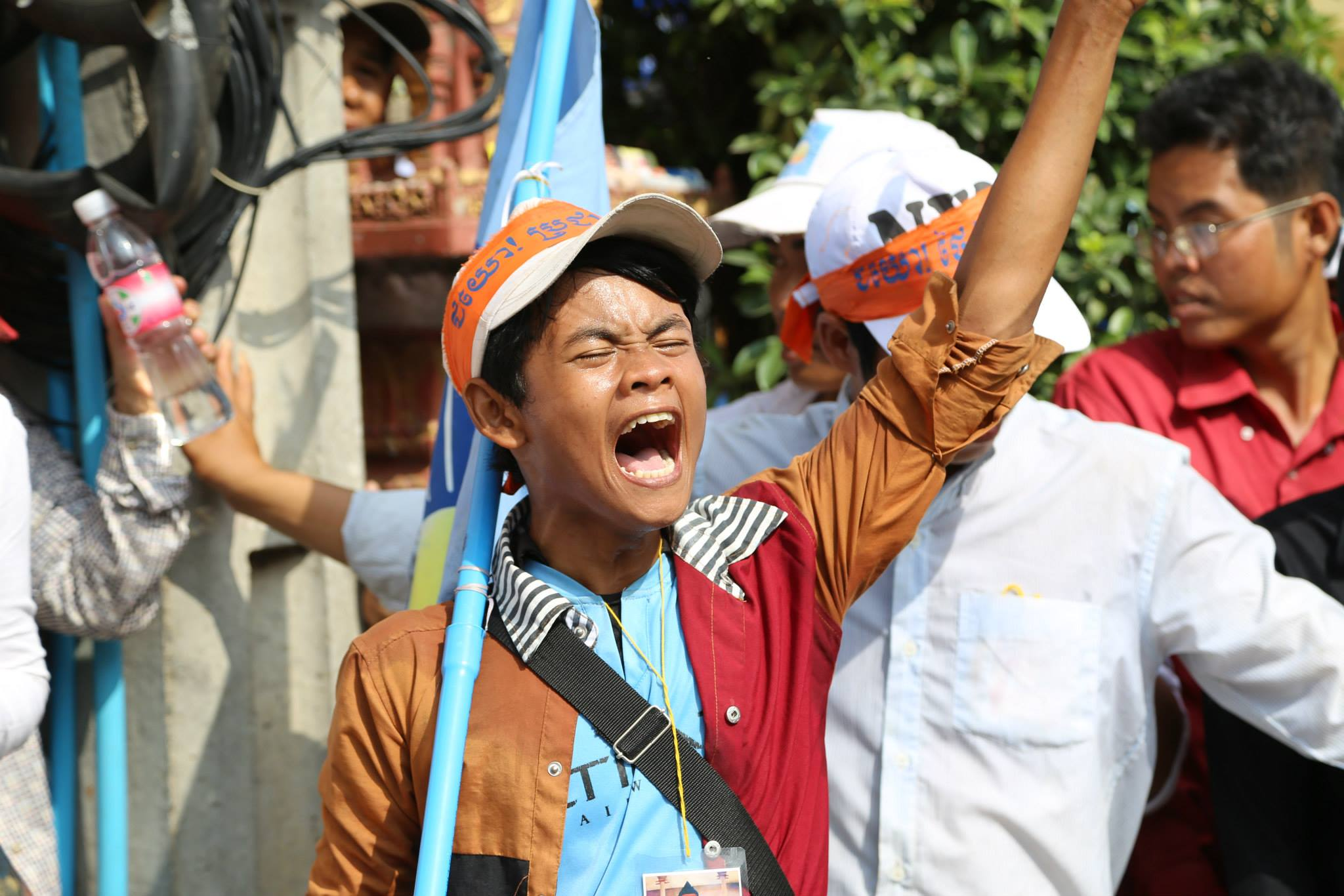
A young protester screams for Prime Minister Hun Sen to step down on the final day of a three-day rally by the opposition.

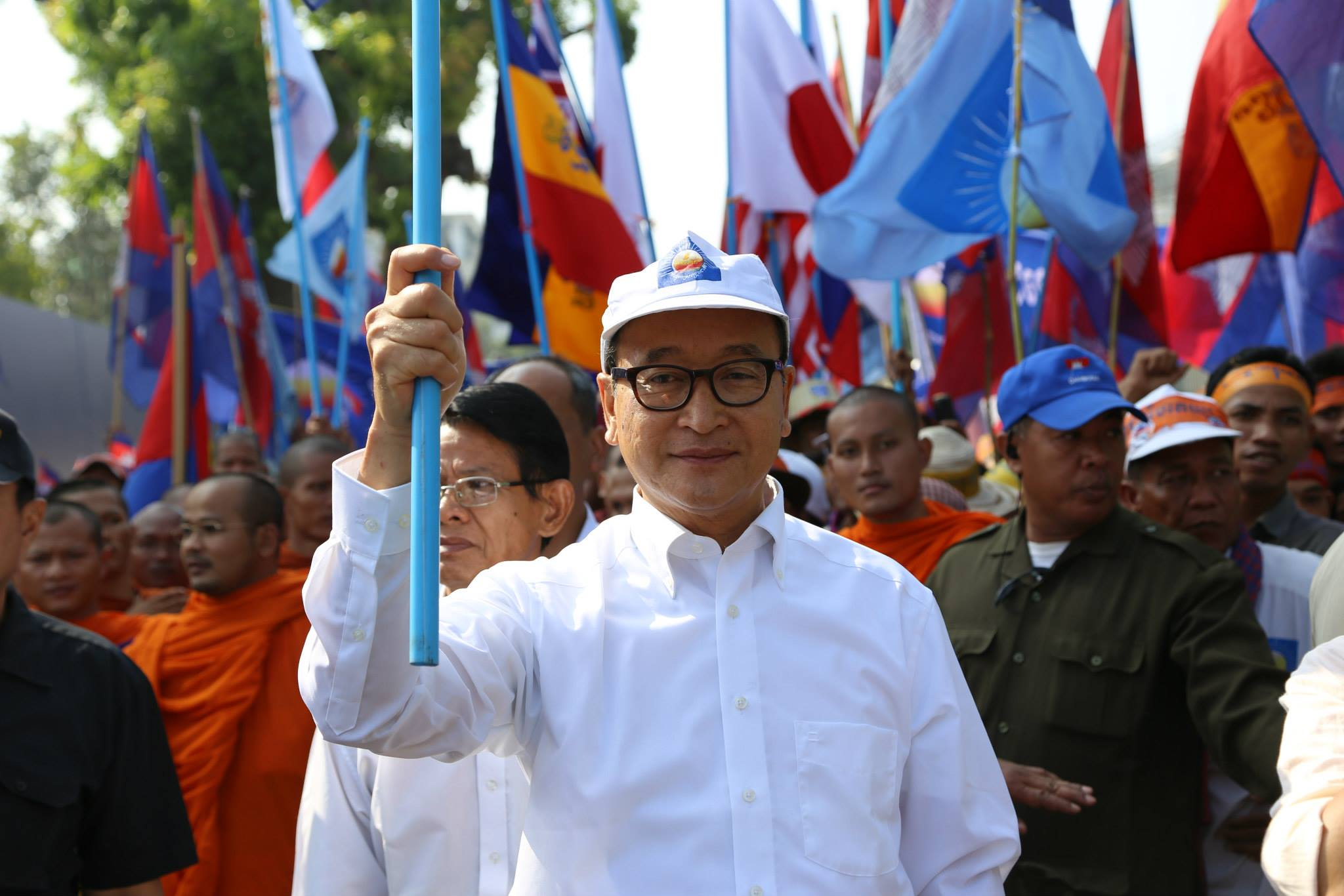
CNRP President Sam Rainsy leads supporters to submit petitions to Western embassies calling for an independent investigation into alleged election irregularities.

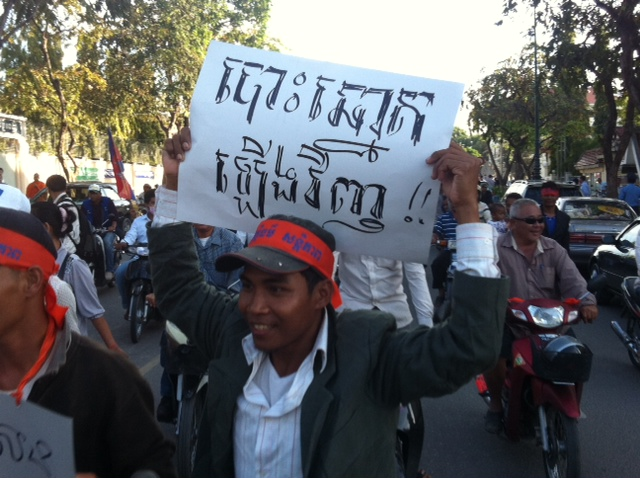
An opposition protester marches, holding up a sign that says "Re-election".

== See also ==
- 2003 Phnom Penh riots
- 2014 anti-Vietnamese protests in Cambodia
- List of protests in the 21st century
- 2020–2021 Thai protests
