= Freedom Park (Cambodia) =

Plaza in Phnom Penh, Cambodia

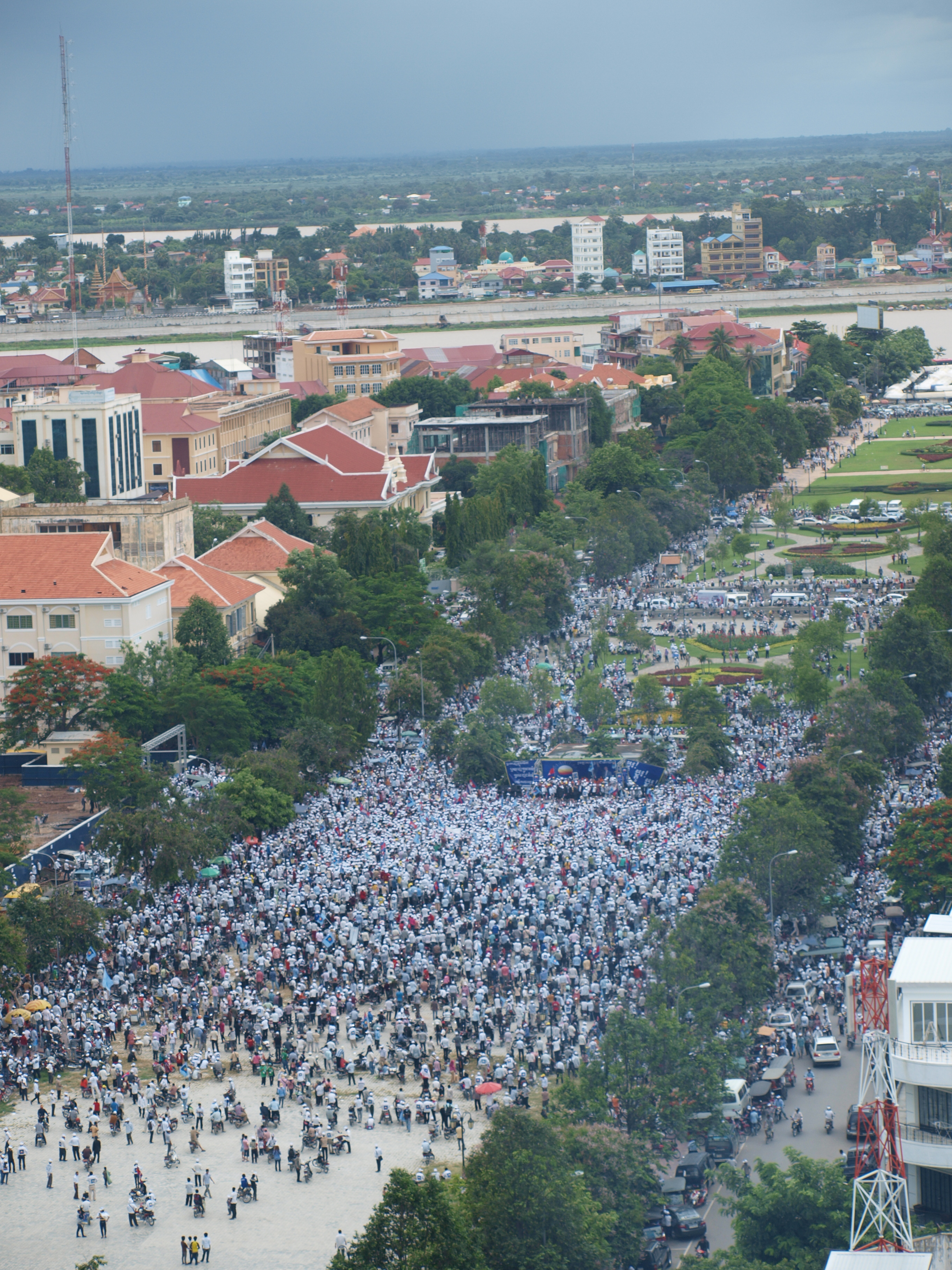
- Members and supporters of the Cambodia National Rescue Party gathering at Freedom Park in 2013
- Interactive map of Freedom Park
- Type: Plaza
- Location: Phnom Penh, Cambodia
- Coordinates: 11°34′24″N 104°55′17″E

Freedom Park, also known as Democracy Square (Khmer: ទីលានប្រជាធិបតេយ្យ, Tiléan Prâchéathĭbâtéyy), was a 8,000-square-kilometre (3,100 sq mi) plaza in downtown Phnom Penh, Cambodia. It was the site of a number of protests from the 1990s until the 2010s.

In 2016, then prime minister Hun Sen ordered the plaza to be relocated and renamed Democracy Park (Khmer: សួនច្បារប្រជាធិបតេយ្យ); the move was completed the following year.

== History ==
Both peaceful and violent protests took place at the plaza following the July 1998 Cambodian general election. Demonstrations were suppressed by authorities by September.

In December 2016, then prime minister of Cambodia Hun Sen requested the plaza be relocated and officially renamed Democracy Park. Phnom Penh City Hall carried out the request in 2017, closing the original location to the public and announcing Sokimex Park as the new location, next to the Tonlé Sap River in the Russey Keo District.

Critics of the move denounced it as an attempt to suppress freedom of speech and assembly. In response, the spokesman for Phnom Penh City Hall stated the move would not affect the ability of individuals to publicly express themselves and would in fact bolster it, as the new location would be, in their view, in a more prominent part of the city's downtown area. The new plaza also features a garden and is significantly bigger than the old one at 20,000 square kilometres (7,700 sq mi), over twice the size of the original 8,000 square kilometres (3,100 sq mi).

== See also ==
- 2013–2014 Cambodian protests
