= Beehive Radio =

- Phnom Penh; Cambodia
- Frequency: 105 FM

Ownership
- Owner: Mam Sonando

Links
- Website: www.sonandosbk.com

Beehive Radio (Khmer: វិទ្យុសំបុកឃ្មុំ) is a Cambodian radio station in Phnom Penh, owned and operated by independent journalist Mam Sonando. It broadcasts on 105 FM. The Committee to Protect Journalists (CPJ) described it in 2012 as "one of Cambodia's few independent news outlets".

== Programming ==
In 2012, Human Rights Watch described Beehive Radio as "a key platform for promotion of human rights and democracy in Cambodia". The station is one of the few to address controversial topics, including "Cambodian civil society, the fight against HIV/AIDS, maternal mortality and human trafficking, campaigns for women’s rights and gender equality, political and economic transparency, equitable and sustainable development, labor rights, environmental protection, the rule of law, and electoral education and election monitoring." It also carries programming by Radio Free Asia, Voice of America, and the Cambodian Center for Human Rights.

== History ==
In 1995, Mam Sonando, a French-Cambodian dual citizen, returned to Cambodia and acquired a broadcasting license for a new station that he named Beehive Radio. It began broadcasting on August 6, 1996. He used the station to advertise a new political party, the Beehive Democratic Society Party, and stood in the 1998 general election. According to the Asia Times, his campaign only won him "a reputation as an eccentric, spouting Buddhist philosophy, pleas for democracy and a personal campaign for attention." After failing to be elected, Sonando dissolved his party, but continued broadcasting on Beehive Radio as an independent journalist.

As of 2012, Sonando had been arrested three times on charges related to the station's broadcasts. In 2003, during the Phnom Penh riots, a caller to Beehive Radio claimed incorrectly that Cambodian embassy officials were killed in Bangkok. On 31 January, Sonando was arrested and accused of "relaying false information", "inciting discrimination", and "inciting crime". He stated to reporters, "They blame me for broadcasting an opinion of a listener which turned out to be untrue. But if I have to go to jail to allow people to express their opinion I am happy." He was released on bail on 11 February and never brought to trial.

Sonando was arrested again on 11 October 2005 after reporting on Prime Minister Hun Sen's treaty with Vietnam settling the two nations' border dispute; the report included a discussion with a French-based expert who criticized Hun Sen's concessions. Sonando was charged with "criminal defamation", "disseminating false information", and "incitement". In January 2006, the charges against him were dropped in what Prime Minister Hun Sen described as "a gift" to visiting US Assistant Secretary of State Christopher R. Hill.

On 15 July 2012, he was arrested again and accused of involvement with protests against evictions for a new rubber plant in Kratié Province. Authorities charged him with "insurrection" and "inciting people to take up weapons against state".

The arrest quickly generated domestic and international criticism. A coalition of 22 Cambodian rights groups called the Cambodian Human Rights Action Committee called on the government to free Sonando "to save the country's reputation". Members of Beehive Radio and the Association of Democrats protested in front of Phnom Penh's royal palace on 23 July. CPJ called for his immediate release, stating that Hun Sen had "a well-worn history of leveling unsubstantiated anti-state charges against journalists to stifle criticism of the administration." Human Rights Watch said that "Sonando's arrest on the heels of [US Secretary of State Hillary] Clinton's visit is a brazen signal that Hun Sen thinks that the US wants his cooperation on other matters so much that he isn't afraid to lower the boom on his critics". Amnesty International named Sonando a prisoner of conscience, "held for the peaceful exercise of his right to freedom of expression".

== See also ==
- Beehive Social Democratic Party
