= Mam Sonando =

Cambodian radio journalist (born 1942)

- ម៉ម សូណង់ដូ
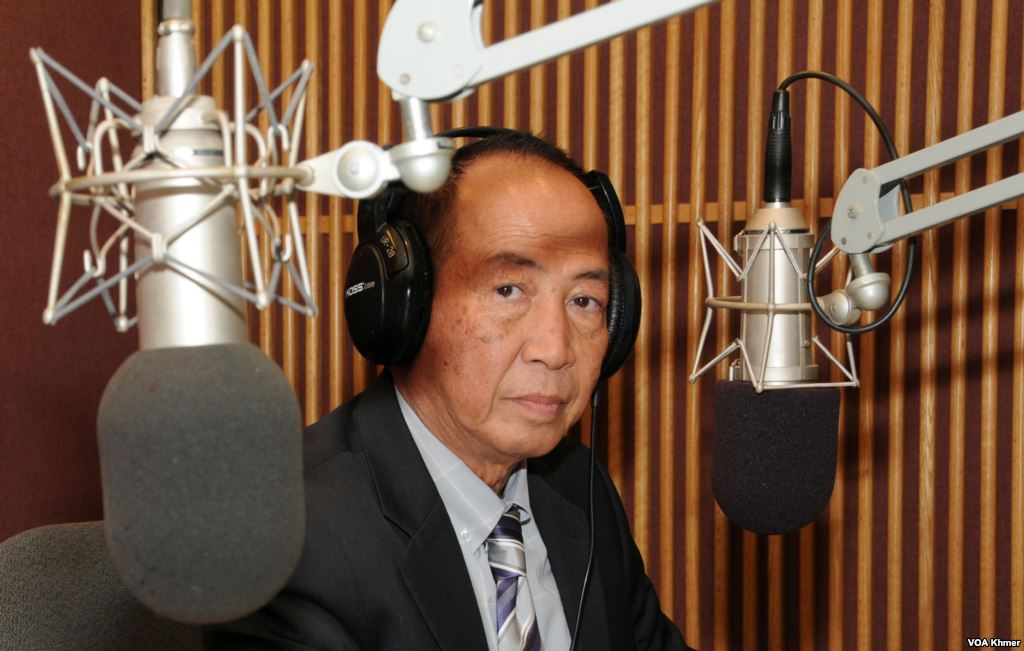
- Sonando in May 2013.
- Born: 13 February 1942 (age 84); Kampong Siem District, Kampong Cham, Cambodia, French Indochina
- Citizenship: Cambodia; France
- Occupations: Journalist; politician
- Years active: 1993–present
- Organization: Beehive Radio
- Known for: independent journalism; 2003, 2005, and 2012 arrests
- Political party: Beehive Social Democratic Party (2015–present)
- Spouse: Den Phanara
- Parent(s): Mam Soth; Eam Ouch

Mam Sonando (Khmer: ម៉ម សូណង់ដូ; born 13 February 1942) is a Cambodian radio journalist and politician with French dual citizenship. He is the owner and director of Phnom Penh's Beehive Radio, which the Committee to Protect Journalists (CPJ) described in 2012 as "one of Cambodia's few independent news outlets". He also acts as a political commentator for the station.

Sonando has been imprisoned three times on charges related to his reporting: a 2003 arrest for "inciting riots", a 2005 arrest for defamation, and a 2012 arrest for insurrection. His twenty-year prison sentence for the latter was protested by human rights groups, and US President Barack Obama expressed concerns about the case in a meeting with Prime Minister Hun Sen. The sentence was overturned by an appeals court in March 2013, and Sonando was instead given a five-year suspended sentence on charges of causing civil unrest.

== Biography ==
Mam Sonando was born on 13 February 1942 in a small district called Kampong Siem in Kampong Cham Province, Cambodia. His father, Mam Soth, was a lawyer. His mother Eam Ouch was born in Battambang province. Sonando traveled to Paris in 1964 for school. He attended the Vaugirard State Technical College of Photography and Cinematography, in Paris, France, from 1969 to 1970. In 1973, he received a bachelor's degree with major in sociology and cinematography and audio visuals, at the Paris XV University.

He left Cambodia again in 1975 to avoid the rule of the Khmer Rouge, remaining in France until 1993. That year, he returned to Cambodia and acquired a broadcasting license for a new station which he named Beehive Radio. He used the station to advertise a new political party, the Beehive Democratic Society Party, and stood in the 1998 parliamentary election. According to the Asia Times, his campaign only won him "a reputation as an eccentric, spouting Buddhist philosophy, pleas for democracy and a personal campaign for attention." After failing to be elected, Sonando dissolved his party, but continued broadcasting on Beehive Radio as an independent journalist.

Sonando is the owner and director of Beehive Radio. In 2012, Human Rights Watch described Beehive Radio as "a key platform for promotion of human rights and democracy in Cambodia". The station is one of the few to address controversial topics, including "Cambodian civil society, the fight against HIV/AIDS, maternal mortality and human trafficking, campaigns for women's rights and gender equality, political and economic transparency, equitable and sustainable development, labor rights, environmental protection, the rule of law, and electoral education and election monitoring." It also carries programming by Radio Free Asia, Voice of America, the Cambodian Center for Human Rights, and Radio France Internationale.

The station is funded by a combination of advertising and private donations. Some companies have declined to advertise with Beehive Radio due to its occasionally controversial reporting and political stances. Sonando also refuses to run advertisements for "vice" products, including cigarettes.

== 2003 arrest ==
In January 2003, riots broke out in Phnom Penh after a Cambodian newspaper incorrectly reported that a Thai actress had stated Angkor Wat properly belonged to Thailand. On 29 January, the Thai embassy was burned, and hundreds of Thai immigrants fled the country to avoid the violence. During the riots, a caller to Beehive Radio claimed incorrectly that Cambodian embassy officials were killed in Bangkok. On 31 January, Sonando was arrested and accused of "relaying false information", "inciting discrimination", and "inciting crime". He stated to reporters, "They blame me for broadcasting an opinion of a listener which turned out to be untrue. But if I have to go to jail to allow people to express their opinion I am happy."

Sonando was formally charged in court on 1 February; ten days later, he was released on bail. The charges never came to trial.

== 2005 arrest ==
Sonando was arrested again on 11 October 2005 after reporting on Prime Minister Hun Sen's treaty with Vietnam settling the two nations' border dispute; the report included a discussion with a French-based expert who criticized Hun Sen's concessions. Sonando was charged with "criminal defamation", "disseminating false information", and "incitement". On 3 November, he was denied bail.

Sonando's arrest was criticized by the United Nations and the European Union. A coalition of 70 Cambodian civil society organizations also pushed for his release. CPJ condemned the arrest as part of a "broad crackdown on freedom of expression", and Amnesty International named him a prisoner of conscience.

In late January 2006, Sonando was granted bail ahead of a visit by US Assistant Secretary of State Christopher R. Hill. Hun Sen described the release as a "gift" to the visitor. The charges against Sonando were dropped before the end of the month.

== 2012 arrest ==
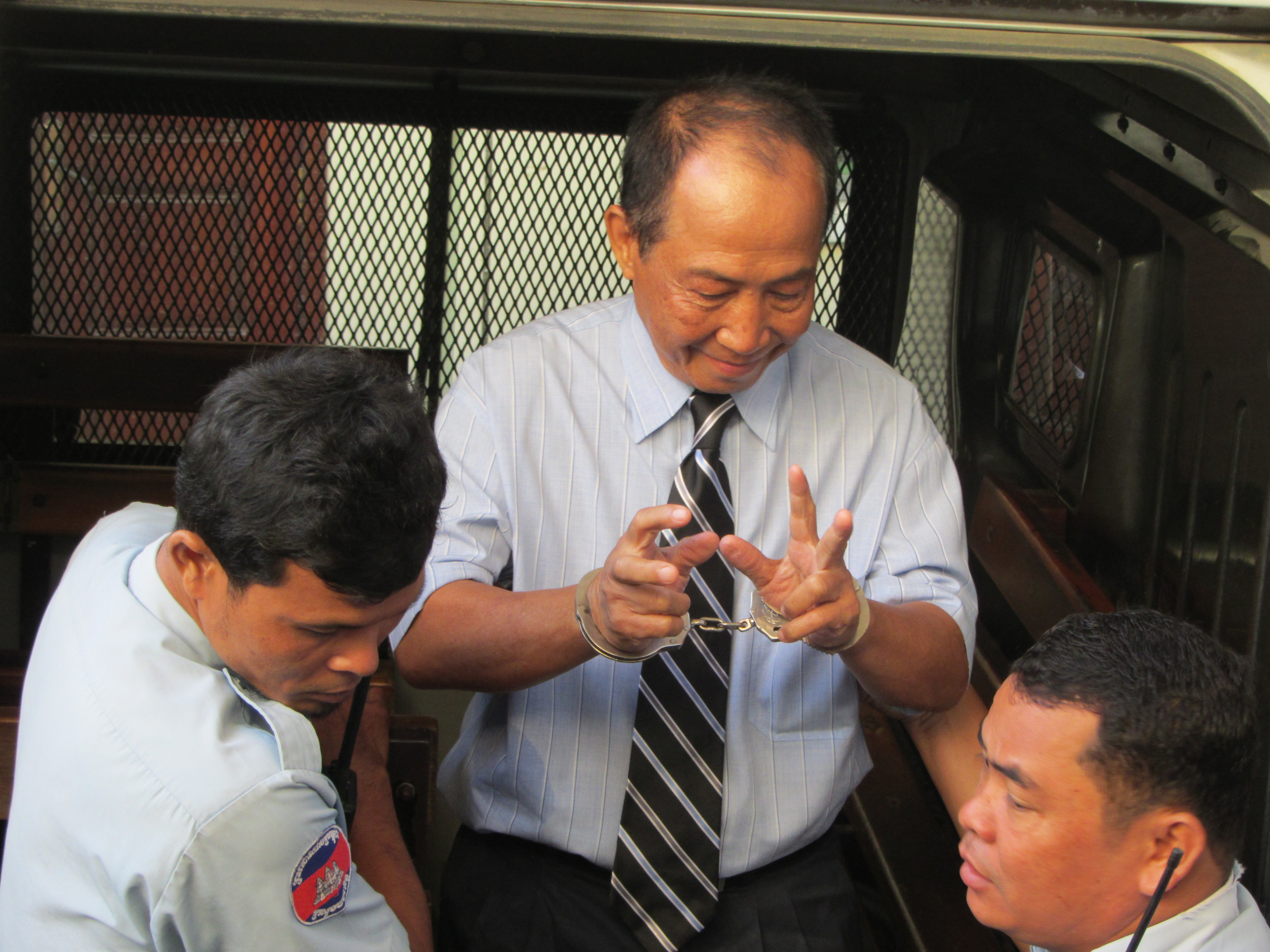
Mam Sonando (center) in police custody.

In mid-2012, Beehive Radio reported on an International Court of Justice complaint against Prime Minister Hun Sen blaming him for the 2010 Phnom Penh stampede, in which 347 people were killed. The report sparked a new series of disputes between Sonando and Hun Sen. On 26 June 2012, Hun Sen called for Sonando's arrest while Sonando was out of the country, accusing him of heading a separatist plot in Kratié Province to break it away from the rest of the nation. From 15 to 17 May, the province had been the site of a protest against evictions for a new rubber plant that residents accused of "land grabbing". On the final day of the protests, soldiers opened fire on a crowd of families, killing a 14-year-old girl. Though Sonando returned during the 2012 ASEAN meeting, he was not arrested until 15 July, a few days after its end.

Hun Sen accused Sonando of attempting to create a "state within a state", and Sonando was formally charged with "insurrection" and "inciting people to take up weapons against state". The charges carried a maximum sentence of 30 years in prison. Secessionist charges were also brought against several community activists from the province.

According to Ou Virak of the Cambodian Center for Human Rights, Sonando was then imprisoned in a cell shared with 17 other people, leaving him "half a square meter [5 square feet] to sleep in". On 22 July, he was moved to a prison hospital on account of illness.

Sonando's arrest quickly generated domestic and international criticism. A coalition of 22 Cambodian rights groups, known as the Cambodian Human Rights Action Committee, called on the government to free Sonando "to save the country's reputation". Members of Beehive Radio and the Association of Democrats protested in front of Phnom Penh's royal palace on 23 July.

CPJ called for Sonado's immediate release, stating that Hun Sen had "a well-worn history of leveling unsubstantiated anti-state charges against journalists to stifle criticism of the administration." Human Rights Watch said that "Sonando's arrest on the heels of [US Secretary of State Hillary] Clinton's visit is a brazen signal that Hun Sen thinks that the US wants his cooperation on other matters so much that he isn't afraid to lower the boom on his critics". Amnesty International again named Sonando a prisoner of conscience, "held for the peaceful exercise of his right to freedom of expression". The International Federation for Human Rights and the World Organisation Against Torture issued a joint statement noting that they were "gravely concerned" about the charges and calling for Sonando's immediate release. Reporters Without Borders described the arrest as "like a parting slap to all those who attended last week's ASEAN summit in Phnom Penh. As soon the diplomats leave, the authorities arrest dissidents." The Ireland-based NGO Front Line Defenders included him on the short list for its 2013 Human Rights Defender at Risk award.

On 1 October 2012, Sonando was found guilty by a Phnom Penh court. He was sentenced to twenty years' imprisonment and fined 10 million riel (US$2,500). In November, US President Barack Obama raised concerns about the case during a meeting with Hun Sen. French Prime Minister Jean-Marc Ayrault also called for Sonando to be released.

An appeals court overturned Sonando's conviction on anti-state charges on 14 March 2013, finding that there had been no evidence to convict him. The court instead gave Sonando a five-year suspended sentence on charges that he had been involved in the Kratié unrest. A crowd of hundreds of Sonando supporters gathered outside the courthouse to hear the verdict. Amnesty International called the ruling "a positive step for freedom of expression in the country", but added that "Mam Sonando should never have been imprisoned in the first place, and the convictions that stand appear baseless." Sonando was released from prison on 15 March, the day after the ruling. Following his release, Sonando stated his intention to clear his name of the remaining charges.

== 2014 protest ==
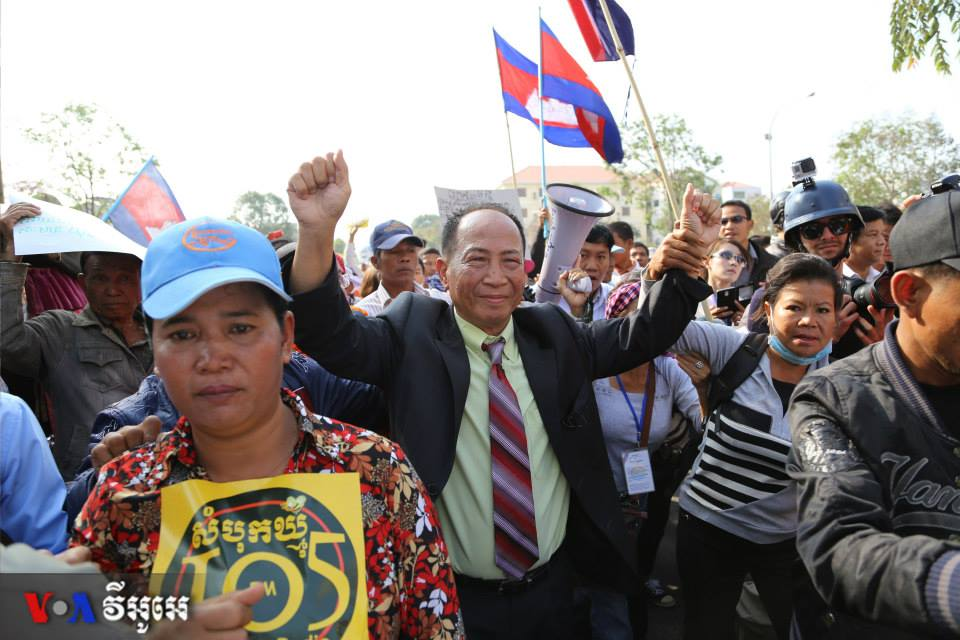
Beehive Radio protesters marching.

In January 2014, Mam Sonando organized a mass demonstration, which demanded the government to expand his radio reach and open a TV station. The Minister of Information Khieu Kanharith denied the permission for the expansion but Mam Sonando told reporters the denial is unconstitutional. Protesters clashed with police on 28 January injuring at least 9 of the demonstrators. In response to the violence, Human Rights Watch calls for the United Nations to pressure the Cambodian government. Reporters Without Borders and Freedom House have also condemned the violence.

== Personal life ==
Sonando is married to Den Phanara. He is a devout Buddhist who constructed a Buddhist temple beside his radio station, and is an avid fan of jazz.

He is Soth Polin's brother-in-law.
