= Vietnamese Cambodians =

Ethnic Vietnamese people in Cambodia

Vietnamese Cambodians ជនជាតិខ្មែរវៀតណាម/ខ្មែរកាត់វៀតណាម Người Campuchia gốc Việt/Người Việt kiều Campuchia
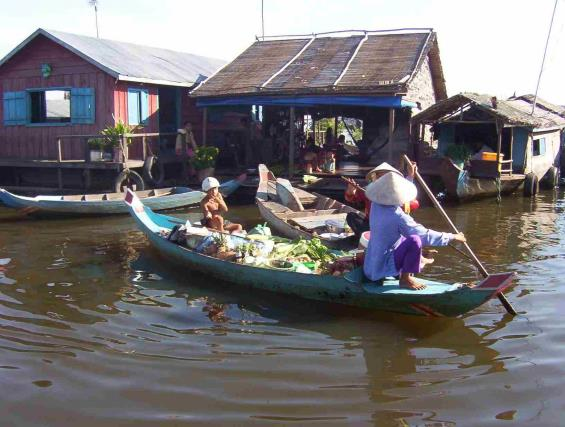
- A Vietnamese floating village in Siem Reap

Total population
- 180,000–1,000,000 (est.); 1% - 6.25% of the Cambodian population

Regions with significant populations
- Siem Reap, Phnom Penh, South-East Cambodia

Languages
- Vietnamese, Khmer

Religion
- Vietnamese folk religion, Mahayana Buddhism, Theravada Buddhism, Caodaism, Roman Catholicism

Related ethnic groups
- Overseas Vietnamese, Austroasiatic peoples

Vietnamese Cambodians refers to Cambodians of Vietnamese ancestry. According to the Cambodian 2019 census, there are 78,090 people who speak Vietnamese as their mother tongue. According to independent scholars in 2018, there could be somewhere between 400,000 and one million ethnic Vietnamese. They mostly reside in southeastern parts of Cambodia bordering Vietnam or on houseboats in the Tonlé Sap lake and Mekong rivers. The first Vietnamese came to settle modern-day Cambodia from the early 19th century during the era of the Nguyễn lords and most of the Vietnamese came to Cambodia during the periods of French colonial administration and the People's Republic of Kampuchea administration. During the Khmer Republic and Khmer Rouge governments in the 1970s under the Pol Pot regime, the Vietnamese among others were targets of mass genocides; thousands of Vietnamese were killed and many more sought refuge in Vietnam.

Despite engagement and collaboration between the two countries, Vietnamese individuals have been the targets of xenophobic attacks by opposition political parties critical of Hun Sen's policies. Many of the stateless Vietnamese residents face difficulties in getting access to education, employment, and housing. Although xenophobic sentiments have been a continuing source of concern, they have not been a barrier towards neighborly ties within the context of Southeast Asia and other international affairs.

== History ==
Relations between Cambodia and Vietnam date back to when Chey Chettha II, in order to balance the influence of the Siamese forces, which had devastated the previous capital at Longvek during the reign of his father, had struck an alliance with Vietnam and married Princess Nguyễn Phúc Ngọc Vạn, a daughter of Lord Nguyễn Phúc Nguyên, in 1618. In return, the king had granted the Vietnamese the right to establish settlements in Mô Xoài (now Bà Rịa), in the region of Prey Nokor—which they colloquially referred to as Sài Gòn, and which later became Ho Chi Minh City. Vietnamese settlers first entered the Mekong and the Prey Nokor area (later Saigon) from the 1620s onward. The region then as now is known to the Cambodians as Kampuchea Krom but by cession and conquest (Vietnamese expansion to the South, dubbed Nam Tiến), the area came under Vietnamese control. Under the reign of Chey Chettha II, Cambodia formally ceded the eastern portion to the Nguyễn lords.

With the unification Vietnam under Emperor Gia Long, the Court of Huế asserted its hegemony in 1813 and sent 10,000 troops to Phnom Penh. The Cambodian court was split into rival factions vying for power and some members of the Cambodian royal sought the support of the Vietnamese, thus implanting Vietnamese power within the kingdom. Favors were granted to allow more Vietnamese settlers and by the reign of Emperor Minh Mạng, Vietnam chose to impose its rule directly, relegating the Cambodian court to a minor role. Administrative renaming of town and provinces was carried out while Vietnamese customs were forced upon the Cambodian populace. The heavy-handed policies stirred resentment among the Cambodian populace, provoking protracted insurgency and unrest. Vietnam was forced to withdraw, accepting the restoration of the royal candidate Ang Duong as the Cambodian king. Vietnam nonetheless joined Siam to hold Cambodia in joint vassalage.

In 1880 with the establishment of the French colonial administration, Cambodia joined Vietnam as part of French Indochina, the status to Vietnamese residents in Cambodia was formally legalized. Over the next fifty years, large numbers of Vietnamese migrated to Cambodia. Population censuses conducted by the French recorded an increase in the Vietnamese population from about 4,500 in the 1860s to almost 200,000 at the end of the 1930s. When the Japanese invaded Indochina in 1940, Vietnamese nationalists in Cambodia launched a brief but unsuccessful attempt to attack the French colonial administrators.

With independence in 1954, Cambodia legislated a citizenship law based on knowledge in the Khmer language and national origin; this effectively excluded most Vietnamese and Chinese Cambodians. At the grass root level, Vietnamese also faced occasional cases of violent intimidation from the Cambodians. During a Sangkum congress in 1962, politicians debated on the issue of citizenship on Cambodia's ethnic minorities and a resolution was passed not to grant naturalization of Vietnamese residents.

When Lon Nol assumed power in 1970, the Khmer Republic government launched a propaganda campaign to portray the ethnic Vietnamese as agents of the Vietcong. About 30,000 Vietnamese were killed, while an additional tens of thousands fled to Vietnam. Five years later in 1975 when the Khmer republic met its demise at the hands of the Khmer Rouge, fewer than 80,000 Vietnamese remained in Cambodia. The Khmer Rouge proceeded to expel close to three quarters back to Vietnam; the remaining 20,000 were classified as mixed Vietnamese and Khmer descent and were killed by the regime. By the time Vietnamese troops entered Cambodia in 1979, virtually all of Cambodia's Vietnamese population were either displaced or killed. Vietnam established a new regime known as the People's Republic of Kampuchea (PRK), and Vietnamese advisers were appointed in the new government administration. In 1983, the PRK government formulated an official policy to encourage former Vietnamese residents to return and settle in Cambodia. Even Vietnamese immigrants who had no family ties to Cambodia came to settle in the country, as there was little border control to limit Vietnamese migrants from entering the country. The Vietnamese were recognized as an official minority under the PRK regime, and Overseas Vietnamese Associations were established in parts of Cambodia with sizable Vietnamese populations. The PRK government also identity cards were issued to them until the withdrawal of Vietnamese troops in 1990.

Vietnamese migrant workers started to arrive from 1992 onward due to the creation of new job opportunities by the UNTAC administration. At the same time, the UNTAC administration allowed the opening of political offices and political parties such as FUNCINPEC and the BLDP began to propagate anti-Vietnamese sentiments among the populace to shore up electorate support in the 1993 general elections. In November 1992, the Khmer Rouge which controlled northwestern parts of Cambodia, passed a resolution to target systematic killings of Vietnamese soldiers and civilians. The first guerrilla-style attacks by the Khmer Rouge on Vietnamese civilians started in December 1992, and Khmer Rouge soldiers justified the killings by claiming that some of the civilians were Vietnamese soldiers in disguise. The spate of killings by Khmer Rouge prompted some 21,000 ethnic Vietnamese to flee to Vietnam in March 1993.

In August 1994, the National Assembly of Cambodia introduced an immigration law which authorized the deportation of illegal immigrants. The UNHCR assessed the law as singling out and targeting Vietnamese migrants in Cambodia; the Cambodian government had to reassure the international community that no mass deportations of Vietnamese refugees would be implemented. Meanwhile in the remote northwest, the Khmer Rouge continued to carry out sporadic attacks on Vietnamese civilians. The Khmer Rouge formally surrendered to the government in 1999 but ethnic Vietnamese continued to face discrimination in Cambodia afterwards, both as physical intimidation from the general population and administrative threats by local authorities. Anti-Vietnamese are familiar rallying cries from politicians in campaigns during the general elections and become even more acute when disputes flared in the news between the two countries.

== Demographics ==
=== Population ===
The Vietnamese are generally concentrated along the banks of the Tonlé Sap lake and Mekong river which encompass the provinces of Siem Reap, Kampong Chhnang, and Pursat. Smaller populations may be found in Phnom Penh as well as southeastern provinces bordering Vietnam, namely Prey Veng, Svay Rieng, Kampong Cham, Kampot, Kandal, Kratié, and Takéo. The Vietnamese population was at its largest in 1962 when the government census showed that they were the country's largest minority and reflected 3.8% of the country's population. Demographic researchers returned higher estimated numbers of Vietnamese than government censuses reflect. For example, in the 1960s, the number of resident Vietnamese may be as high as 400,000, while another Cambodian-based researcher, Michael Vickery had estimated the Vietnamese resident population to be between 200,000 and 300,000 in 1986. On the other hand, government censuses conducted during the 1980s put the figures to be no more than 60,000. The following population figures shows population figures of ethnic Vietnamese based on figures derived from government censuses:

Population history

Year	Pop.	±%
1874	4,452	—
1911	79,050	+1675.6%
1921	140,225	+77.4%
1931	176,000	+25.5%
1936	191,000	+8.5%
1962	218,000	+14.1%
1981	8,197	−96.2%

Year	Pop.	±%
1984	56,000	+583.2%
1995	95,597	+70.7%
1998	96,597	+1.0%
2008	72,775	−24.7%
2013	14,678	−79.8%
2019	78,090	+432.0%

=== Religion ===
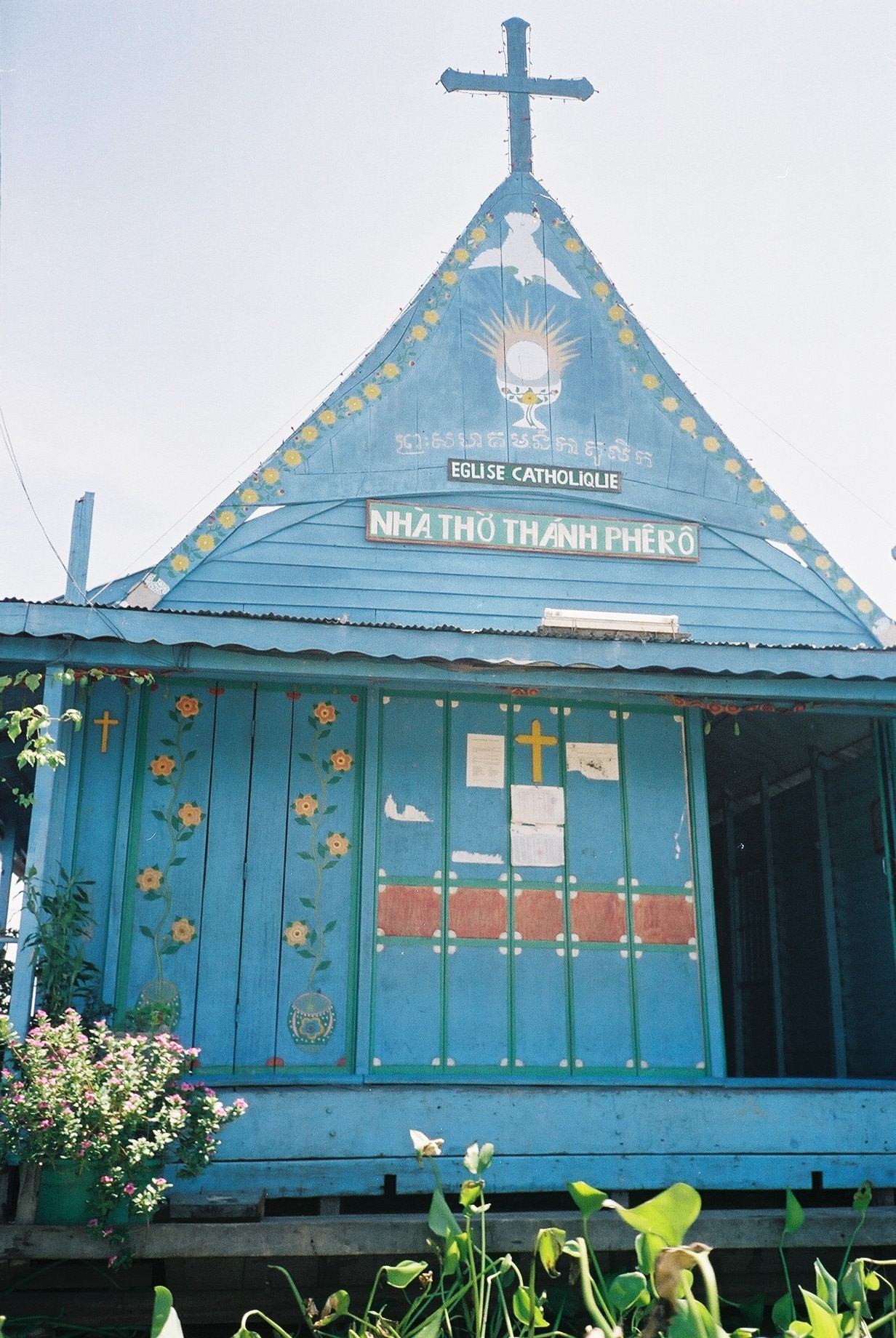
Vietnamese Catholic church in Kampong Luong

The Vietnamese identify themselves as adherents of Mahayana Buddhism, Cao Đài, or Roman Catholicism. Vietnamese Buddhists are mainly found among impoverished communities living in the Tonle Sap or the rural parts of Cambodia. As Vietnamese Buddhists derive their religious doctrines and beliefs from Chinese folk religion, they participate in religious rituals organised by Chinese Cambodians during festive seasons. Vietnamese communities that have settled down in Cambodia have adopted Khmer Theravada Buddhist practices to some extent. Vietnamese adherents of Roman Catholicism consist of descendants of refugees that fled the religious persecution during the reign of Tự Đức. They are split between city dwellers based in Phnom Penh and fishing communities that are based in Tonle Sap. Vietnamese Catholics make up about 90% of Cambodia's Roman Catholic community, and in the 1960s they had about 65,000 adherents in the country. Most of the Vietnamese Catholics were either deported to Vietnam or killed in March 1970, and it was only in 1990 that the Catholic church was allowed to re-establish itself in Cambodia. In 2005, there were about 25,000 Catholics in the country.

A minority of Vietnamese are also followers of the Cao Đài faith which was introduced in 1927. Caodaism attracted both Vietnamese and Cambodian adherents within the first few years of its founding, but a royal decree which outlawed the religion and efforts by Cambodian nationalists to prosecute Khmer adherents led to Caodaism being observed solely by Vietnamese from the 1930s onward. A Cao Đài temple was built in Mao Tse Tung Boulevard in 1937, and in the 1960s there were about 70,000 adherents in Cambodia. Caodaism was outlawed during the Khmer Republic and Khmer Rouge regimes, but regained official recognition in 1985 and has about 2,000 adherents in 2000.

=== Language ===
The Vietnamese as a whole exhibit varying levels of fluency in the Khmer and Vietnamese languages. Vietnamese that live in self-contained fishing communities along the Tonle Sap use Vietnamese in their day-to-day conversations and have individuals that have limited Khmer language skills and those that are bilingual in both languages. On the other hand, Vietnamese that live in predominantly Khmer-speaking neighborhoods send their children to public schools, and as a result the children are able to speak Khmer fluently but show very limited understanding of Vietnamese.

=== Education ===
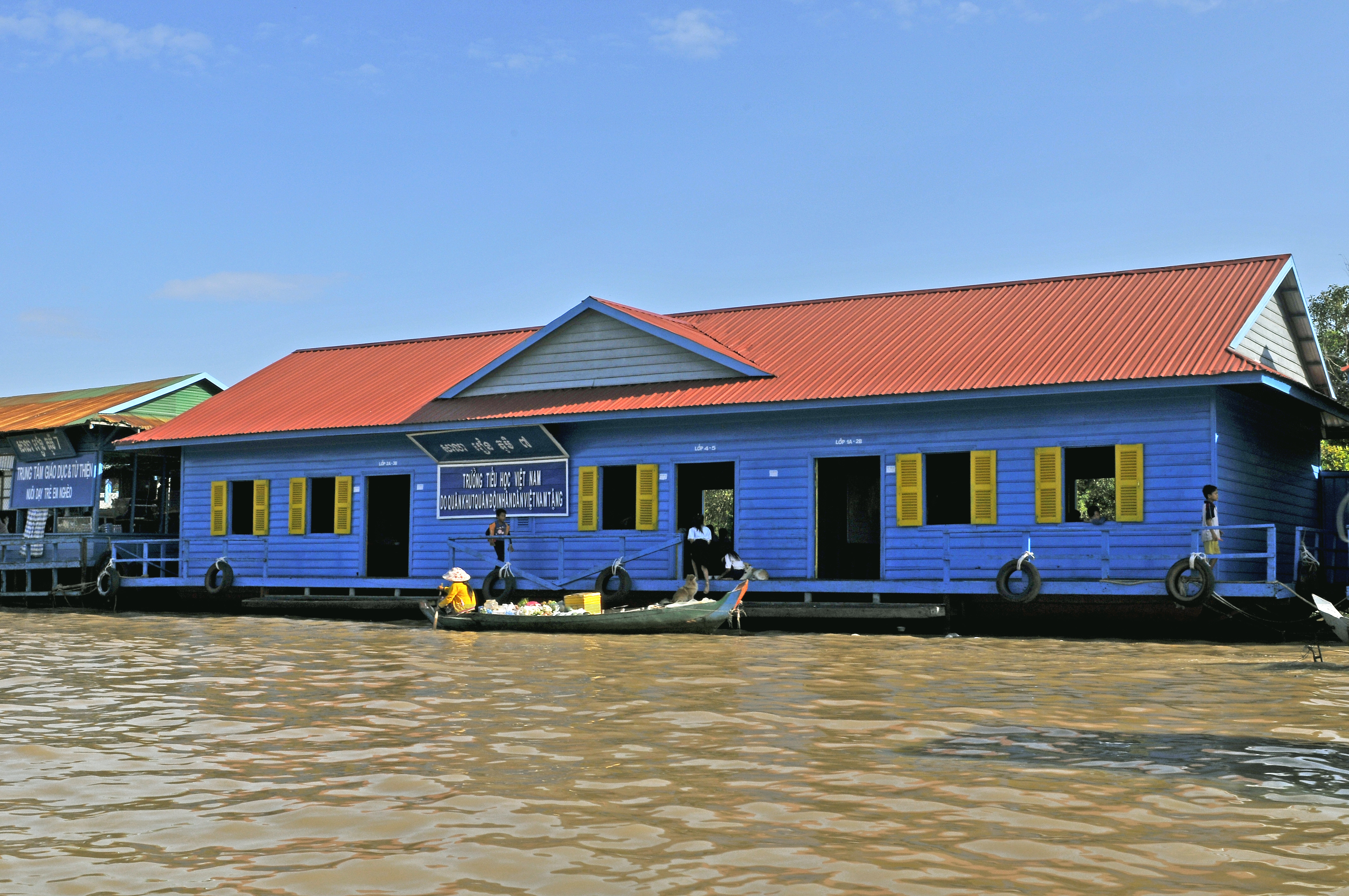
An elementary school on the water in Tonle Sap.

Field research carried out by ethnologists such as Stefan Ehrentraut in 2013 shows that only a minority of Vietnamese children attend public schools, with figures varying across different provinces. Ehrentraut wrote that it is not rare for local commune officials to claim that ethnic Vietnamese enrolment into their commune attended state schools fare below 10%. As the majority of Vietnamese do not carry citizenship papers, they were unable to enrol their children into public schools. In a small number of cases, this is a reason why Vietnamese students are unable to proceed to higher grades, according to Ehrentraut. Vietnamese students also faced difficulties in academic work, as classes are taught exclusively in the Khmer language, and Vietnamese children that grew up speaking Vietnamese at home have limited competency in Khmer. In some Vietnamese communities based in the Tonle Sap and Mekong rivers, there are private schools that are run by Vietnamese community associations and Christian organisations. The private schools cater the teaching of the Vietnamese language, and are mostly attended by children of impoverished families.

== Economy ==
During the French colonial administration, educated Vietnamese were employed in the civil service administration as secretaries, clerks and bureaucrats. When Cambodia gained independence in 1953, the Sihanouk-led government phased out most of the Vietnamese civil servants with Cambodians, and they sought employment in banks and commercial enterprises as secretaries and other office-based positions. In the 1960s, urban-dwelling Vietnamese with lower education backgrounds also worked as mechanics in car repair and machine shops owned by Chinese businessmen. Vietnamese immigrants that settled in the countryside worked as fishermen along the Tonle Sap lake and Mekong river, and also as rubber plantation workers in Kampong Cham and Kratie provinces. As most Vietnamese are stateless residents, they seek a living through ad-hoc various industries such as the construction, craftsmanship, run small businesses, etc. A sizable number of these stateless Vietnamese consisted of migrants that came to Cambodia between 1992 and 1993 during the UNTAC administration. A very small number of Vietnamese are represented in the Cambodian business sector. One example is Sok Kong, the head of the business conglomerate Sokimex which owns state concessionaires in the country's petroleum, tourism and entrepot industries.

== Relations with community and society ==
=== Government ===
According to Amer in 2014, 90% of ethnic Vietnamese are stateless residents of Cambodia, and do not carry citizenship papers such as identity cards or birth certificates. The 1996 Cambodian law on nationality technically permits Vietnamese residents born in Cambodia to take up citizenship, but faced resistance from mid-ranking interior ministry officials who generally refrain from registering Vietnamese residents due to concerns of political implications from opposition parties if citizenship were to be granted. A minority of Vietnamese residents were able to obtain citizenship only after paying bribes to interior ministry officials, or were married to Khmer spouses. The minority of Vietnamese residents who hold citizenship reported of interior ministry officials confiscating their citizenship papers. As a result, the Vietnamese faced legal restrictions from getting access to public healthcare, education, employment and buying land for housing as the majority do not carry Cambodian citizenship. Stateless Vietnamese built floating settlements in-lieu of buying land-based dwellings which require citizenship papers. According to field research carried out by Cambodia's Minority Rights Organisation, interior ministry officials would confront Vietnamese fishermen in the Tonle Sap and demand bribes in order to allow them to carry out fishing.

=== Community ===
Most Vietnamese are unrepresented in the Cambodian commune councils as they lack Cambodian citizenship. According to respondents from Ehrentraut's field research, the majority of Cambodian commune chiefs and officials express support in excluding Vietnamese representatives from getting citizenship and participating in commune elections and meetings. The Vietnamese appoint their own village heads, and convey community concerns Vietnamese community associations (Vietnamese: Tổng hội người Campuchia gốc Việt) that was first established in 2003. The community associations own limited assets and obtains funding from membership fees, donations from the Vietnamese embassy in Cambodia and sale of cemetery land from the Vietnamese communities. The funds are subsequently used to address Vietnamese communal concerns which includes supporting religious places of worship and teaching of the Vietnamese language, as well as providing assistance to disadvantaged families. While the community associations have the tacit support of the Vietnamese community, the majority do not accept membership for fear of getting social stigma from mainstream Cambodian society. As of 2013, branches of these associations are established in 19 out of 23 provinces across Cambodia.

=== Politics ===
The issue of Vietnamese presence in Cambodia has been used as a topic by political parties to shore up electorate support since the 1993 general elections. Mainstream political parties that participated in the 1993 election included FUNCINPEC, BLDP and MOLINAKA, and they broached on topics concerning the presence of Cambodia's Vietnamese population and perceived Vietnamese interference in the government during campaign trails. These political parties also charged that the presence of Vietnamese in the country were the cause of economic failures, and promises were made to expel the Vietnamese in the situation that they win the elections. During this same period of time, the Khmer Rouge which has earlier refused to participate in the elections also espoused similar anti-Vietnamese sentiments with mainstream political parties albeit on a more extreme form. The Khmer Rouge would issue statements and radio broadcasts accusing UNTAC of collaborating with Vietnam, and called for expulsion of the Vietnamese population through force. They would follow up with attacks upon Vietnamese civilians, which continued even after the end of the 1993 elections.

When the 1998 general elections were held, FUNCINPEC and the then-newly formed Sam Rainsy Party repeated the use of anti-Vietnamese rhetoric in their campaigns. The leaders of these two parties, Norodom Ranariddh and Sam Rainsy charged that some stateless Vietnamese had bribed state officials to obtain citizenship and the Vietnamese government still maintained political influence over the ruling party, the Cambodian People's Party. At the same time, number of incidents of violent attacks against Vietnamese civilians rose, which are carried out by both the Khmer Rouge remnants and Cambodian civilians alike. The number of politically motivated acts of violence against Vietnamese civilians reduced after 2000, and in the subsequent 2003 and 2008 general elections opposition political parties the use of anti-Vietnamese rhetoric was also reduced. CNRP leaders also stoked claims on historical ties of Kampuchea Krom, and led to more anti-Vietnamese sentiments among CNRP supporters. When the CNRP narrowly lost the 2013 elections, they launched a series of anti-government protests between 2013-2014 which resulted in incidents of Vietnamese shops in Phnom Penh being ransacked. Vietnamese who hold Cambodian citizenship have also expressed fear over physical insecurity during election periods, which is most apparent during the 1993 and 2013 elections when Vietnamese civilians faced physical intimidation from the Khmer Rouge and CNRP supporters respectively and have abstained from participating in elections.

== See also ==
- Cambodia–Vietnam relations
- Overseas Vietnamese
- Immigration to Cambodia
- Siamese Cambodians

== Bibliography ==
=== Books ===
- Corfield, Justin (2009). The History of Cambodia. ABC-CLIO. ISBN 978-0313357237.
- Heder, Stepher R.; et al. (1995). Propaganda, Politics and Violence in Cambodia: Democratic Transition Under United Nations Peace-Keeping. M.E. Sharpe. ISBN 0765631741.
- Harris, Ian (2008). Cambodian Buddhism: History and Practice. University of Hawaii Press. ISBN 978-0824832988.
- Kuhnt-Saptodewo, Sri (1997). Nationalism and Cultural Revival in Southeast Asia: Perspectives from the Centre and the Region. Otto Harrassowitz Verlag. ISBN 3447039582.
- Schliesinger, Joachim (2015). Ethnic Groups of Cambodia Vol 2: Profile of Austro-Asiatic-Speaking Peoples. Booksmango. ISBN 978-1633232372.
- Willmott, William E. (1967). The Chinese in Cambodia. Publications Centre: University of British Columbia. ISBN 0774844418.

=== Reports and journals ===
- Amer, Ramses (2013). "Domestic Political Change and Ethnic Minorities - A Case Study of the Ethnic Vietnamese in Cambodia" (PDF). Asia-Pacific Social Science Review. 3 (2). Institute for security and development policy, Sweden: 87–101. Archived from the original (PDF) on 2 April 2015.
- Ang, Chanrith (March 2014). "LIMBO ON EARTH: An Investigative Report On the Current Living Conditions and Legal Status of Ethnic Vietnamese in Cambodia" (PDF). Minority Rights Organisation. Archived from the original (PDF) on 4 March 2016.
- Ehrentraut, Stefan (2013). "Challenging Khmer Citizenship: Minorities, the State, and the International Community in Cambodia" (PDF). Asia-Pacific Social Science Review. 34 (5). Universität Potsdam. doi:10.1080/01419870.2010.537359. S2CID 145188841. Archived from the original (PDF) on 2 April 2015.
- Goscha, Christopher E. (2008). "Widening the Colonial Encounter: Asian Connections Inside French Indochina During the Interwar Period" (PDF). Modern Asian Studies. 43 (5). Cambridge University Press: 1189–1228. doi:10.1017/S0026749X0800351X. S2CID 145129327. Archived from the original (PDF) on 30 December 2013.
- Pen Socheat and Heng Phally (July 2014). "Cambodia Socio-Economic Survey 2013" (PDF). National Institute of Statistics, Ministry of Planning, Government of Cambodia.
- Tabeau, Ewa (30 September 2009). "Demographic Expert Report - Khmer Rouge Victims in Cambodia, April 1975 - January 1979 - A critical Assessment of Major Estimates" (PDF). Extraordinary Chamber in the Courts of Cambodia.
