= Cambodia–Vietnam Friendship Monument =

Coordinates: 11.558709°N 104.932793°E

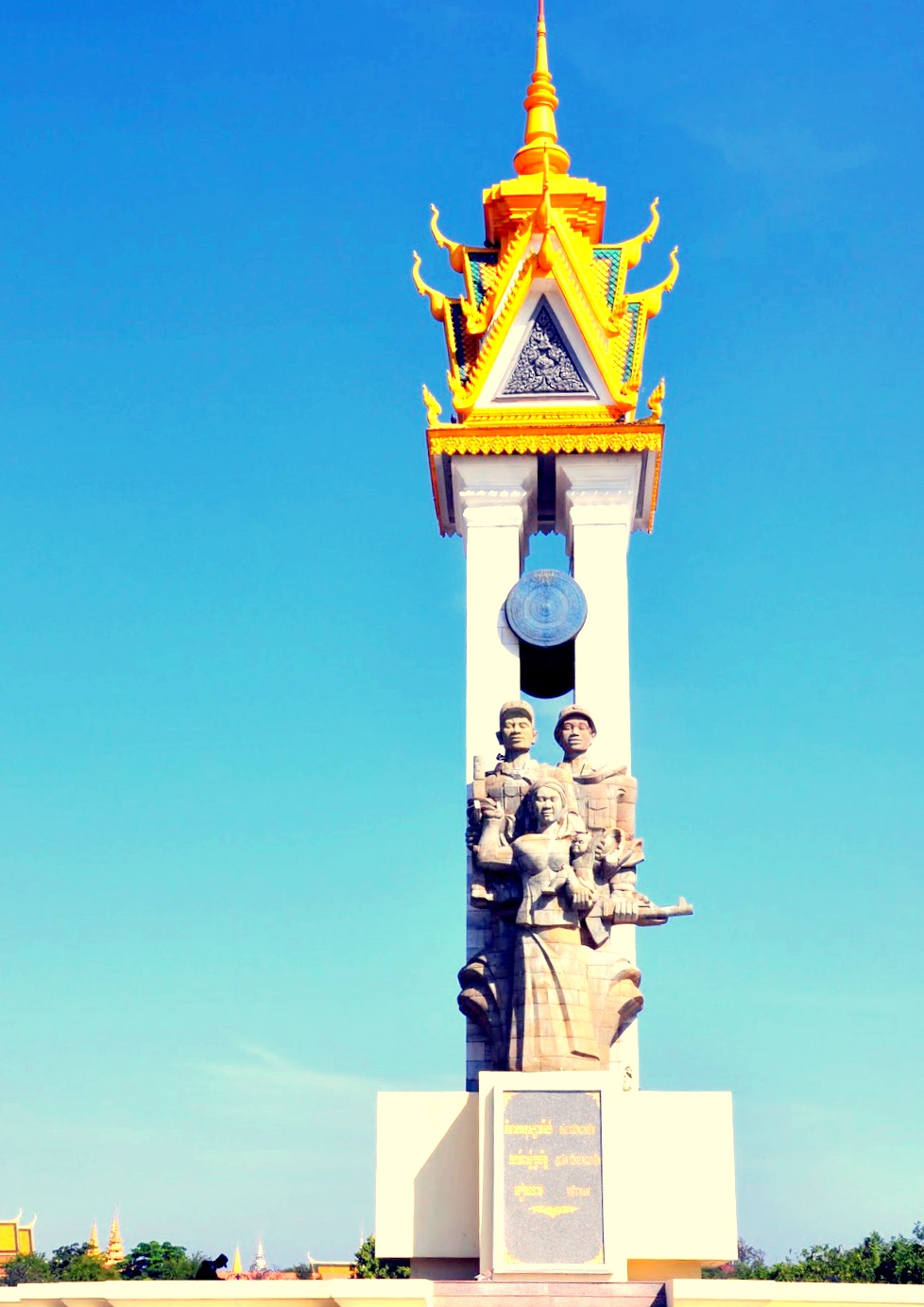
The Monument built in Phnom Penh

The Cambodia–Vietnam Friendship Monument in Phnom Penh, capital of Cambodia, is a large concrete monument commemorating the former alliance between Vietnam and Cambodia. It was built in 1979 by the communist regime that took power after the Cambodian-Vietnamese War, which overthrew the Khmer Rouge regime. The monument is located at the Botum Park near the centre of Phnom Penh not far from the Royal Palace. It features heroic statues of Vietnamese and Cambodian soldiers in the "Socialist realist" style developed in the Soviet Union in the 1930s, together with images of a woman and baby representing Cambodian civilians. The monument is in a popular park in the middle of the city.

The monument has occasionally become a political focal point. On August 30, 1998, during post-electoral protests, a mob climbed onto the monument with hammers, poured gasoline on it and set it on fire. Authorities repaired the monument two months later. On July 29, 2007, a bomb exploded at the base of the monument, causing little damage. It is believed that the bombing was orchestrated by ultra-nationalist Cambodians.
