= Cambodia–Vietnam relations =

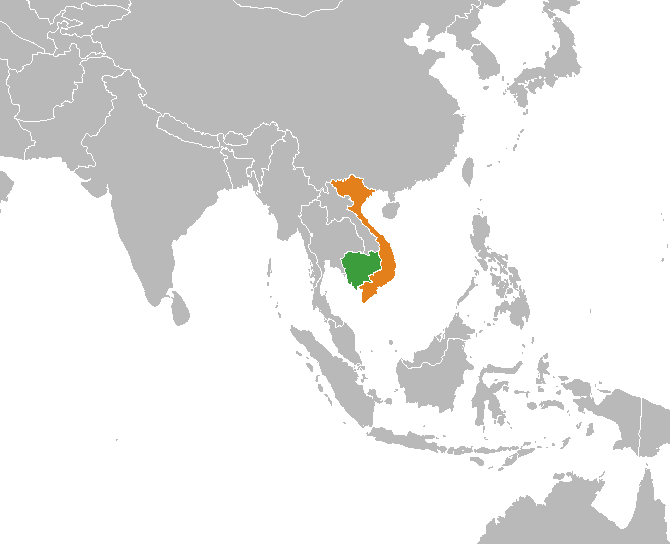
- Cambodia: Vietnam

Cambodia–Vietnam relations take place in the form of bilateral relations between the Kingdom of Cambodia and the Socialist Republic of Vietnam. The countries have shared a land border for the last 1,000 years and share more recent historical links through being part of the French colonial empire. Both countries are members of the Association of Southeast Asian Nations (ASEAN).

== History ==
=== Early history ===
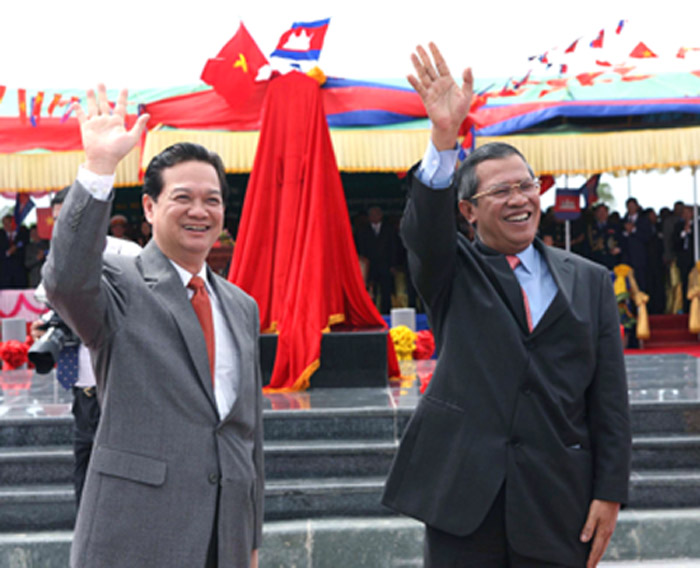
Cambodian Ex-Prime Minister Hun Sen and Vietnamese counterpart Nguyễn Tấn Dũng at a ceremony in Bavet in 2007.

Both the Vietnamese and the Khmer (Cambodian) peoples descended from ancient Austroasiatic-speaking peoples who settled throughout the eastern and southeastern regions of Indochina. Vietnamese society, which began in the Red River Delta south of China, was heavily Sinicized while Khmer society, which was centered around the lower reaches of the Mekong river, was Indianized. During these early periods, the various polities of the two societies did not share a common border.

A Khmer inscription dated 987 records the arrival of Vietnamese merchants from across the Annamite Cordillera. Territorial expansions eventually resulted in the spheres of influence of the growing Vietnamese Dai Viet kingdom and the large, well-established Khmer Empire overlapping in the 11th century, leading to centuries of friction and conflict. The chronicle Việt sử lược states that the Khmer Empire first sent "tribute" (embassy) to Đại Việt—in fact probably further peaceful trading overtures—in 1012 and 1014. The chronicle also recorded Khmer envoys arrived in 1069, 1086, 1088 and 1095. Then in 1128 king Suryavarman II demanded the Vietnamese king in turn send envoys and tribute to the Khmer. From 1128 to 1150, Đại Việt successfully repelled several invasions from the Cambodians.

Much of the Vietnamese southward territorial expansion started by the Lý and expanded by the Trần kings from the 14th century onward came at the expense of Champa which became an increasingly compressed polity. By the 17th century, the Vietnamese military commander government Nguyễn lords encouraged settlers to push into Khmer territories, eventually wresting the Mekong Delta from the Cambodian court. Today, Cambodia shares a 1,137 kilometres long border with Vietnam in the east and southeast.

After the Cambodian–Dutch War, a Buddhist Cambodian king who had converted to Islam was ousted and arrested by the Vietnamese Nguyen lords after Ibrahim's brothers, who remained Buddhists, requested Vietnamese help to restore Buddhism to Cambodia by removing him from the throne.

The 16th and 17th centuries marked the height of the Kinh people's (ethnic Vietnamese) penetration into the southern Mekong Delta, displacing the Khmers. Military campaigns by Nguyen Phuoc Yen opened up more Khmer land for Vietnamese settlement which was followed by Nguyen Phuoc Lam's consolidation of Vietnamese control over the Prey Nokor (later Saigon) region in 1674. Both Mesa (modern Mỹ Tho) and Longhor (modern Vĩnh Long) fell to the Vietnamese by 1732. Nguyen Thien Chinh's and Nguyen Cu Trinh's armies in the 1750s took control of Mekong estuaries, cutting off Cambodia's riverine access to the sea. The Vietnamese presence was bolstered following the Qing conquest of the Ming (1618–1683) when groups of Ming loyalist refugees came to the region seeking the protection of the Nguyễn lords. Those led by Mạc Cửu (1655–1735) helped settle Hà Tiên while others flocked to Bien Hoa and My Tho, pushing out the Khmers. By 1775, the Cambodian court had ceded the areas of Preah Trapeang (Trà Vinh), Srok Khleang (Sóc Trăng), and Moat Chruk (An Giang) to the Vietnamese without bloodshed.

=== Vietnamese invasions of Cambodia, 1811–1845 ===
With the rise of the Nguyễn dynasty in the early 19th century, southern Vietnam came under tighter control of the court. The Vietnamese emperor Minh Mạng (1820–41) took the paternalistic views that the Khmers were backward and ordered his general Trương Minh Giảng to "civilize" the "barbarian" Cambodians. Cambodia itself was brought under Vietnamese control with the occupation of Phnom Penh. Truong reported: "we have decided that Cambodian officials only know how to bribe and be bribed. Offices are sold. Nobody carries out orders; everyone works for his own account". A policy of cultural Vietnamization ("Nhat Thi Dong Nhan") was imposed, forcing Khmers to adopt Vietnamese attire, names, and language. State-encouraged Vietnamese settlement in Phnom Penh ("Tran Tay") accelerated, and Vietnamese occupying forces spirited away native Cambodian leaders like Ang Mey to inland Vietnam in order to weaken Khmer resistance. However, Khmer uprisings in southern Vietnam from 1840 to 1845 made this policy of direct rule inconvenient and expensive for the Vietnamese court, which opted to keep Cambodia as a tributary state after the death of Minh Mang.

After the Siamese–Vietnamese Wars, first in the 1830s and then a decade later, Cambodia became a vassal state under Vietnam and Siam, with the country becoming culturally and administratively Vietnamized. In 1863, the Thai-raised King Norodom of Cambodia (reign 1860–1904) signed a treaty with the French Empire, granting the latter mineral exploration rights if it would secure the country against Thai and Vietnamese attack. However, during the colonial rule of French Indochina, which would later come to include Vietnam, French authorities imported Vietnamese laborers to Cambodia, where the growing minority came to dominate businesses and water resources in the country. In the First Indochina War for independence, some Cambodians, including King Norodom Sihanouk, fought against Viet Minh forces because they feared Vietnamese colonial domination.

=== Vietnam War ===
After independence, the Kingdom of Cambodia maintained diplomatic relations with both North Vietnam and South Vietnam. However the Vietnamese Communists, both the southern Viet Cong and the northern People's Army of Vietnam, used Cambodian territory for bases and supply routes to fight the Vietnam War, despite the Viet Minh having previously assured Cambodian neutrality at the 1954 Geneva Conference. The southern Ngo Dinh Diem administration pursued Viet Cong even into Cambodian territory. Earlier in the Bangkok Plot of 1959, the Diem administration supported a plot by politicians Sam Sary, Son Ngoc Thanh, and Dap Chhuon to overthrow Sihanouk's government and replace it with a right-wing pro-southern regime. Despite Sihanouk's attempts to stay on Hanoi's good side and turning a blind eye to PAVN bases in his country, the PAVN also armed and sheltered the anti-government insurgency known as the Khmer Rouge starting in 1968. By 1969, despite having previously adhered to Cambodian neutrality under Lyndon B. Johnson, the United States decided to bomb North Vietnamese and Viet Cong forces in the Cambodian borderlands during Operation Menu, as the PAVN was using it as a base to attack South Vietnam.

Despite attempts to negotiate with "whichever (Vietnamese state) will turn out to be most reasonable in... [demarcating] our common frontiers", Cambodian leader Norodom Sihanouk failed to get a hearing from a Vietnamese government about latent territorial disputes in Cochinchina and especially Phú Quốc island. Sihanouk himself was accused of accommodating North Vietnamese military bases in Cambodia, and widespread anti-Vietnamese riots culminated in the National Assembly voting to depose Sihanouk in March 1970. Referring mainly to Viet Cong operating in the border region, the new Cambodian president Lon Nol declared that all Vietnamese troops in Cambodia must leave, to maintain the country's neutrality. The North Vietnamese responded to this request (as well as calls for aid from the Khmer Rouge) by invading Cambodia, quickly conquering over 40% of the country. They proceeded to hand over most of the territory they had gained to the Khmer Rouge, and drastically stepped up support for them; because of both this and the invasion, the Khmer Rouge quickly grew from a few thousand fighters to several tens of thousands in the span of two months. American and South Vietnamese forces attempted to dislodge the PAVN soon after during the Cambodian campaign, but failed, despite inflicting heavy losses. Over the next five years, the Cambodian Civil War raged with the North Vietnamese and China backing the Khmer Rouge, while South Vietnam and the United States backed Lon Nol's newly declared Khmer Republic. PAVN forces would engage Khmer Republic troops inside Cambodian borders many more times during this war in support of the Rouge, such as in Operation Chenla II.

The Khmer Rouge opposition came to power in Cambodia in 1975, shortly before the Fall of Saigon to Northern forces.

Anti-Vietnamese sentiment was high in Cambodia during the Vietnam War; ethnic Vietnamese were slaughtered and dumped in the Mekong River at the hands of Lon Nol's anti-Communist forces. The Khmer Rouge, despite being allied with North Vietnam, later imitated Lon Nol's actions.

=== Cambodian-Vietnamese War ===
There have been many wars between Cambodia and Vietnam. In 1979, as a result of the Cambodian–Vietnamese War, Vietnam overthrew the Khmer Rouge, occupied Cambodia, and helped the foundation of client state People's Republic of Kampuchea. Vietnamese occupying soldiers and journalists discovered evidence of the Khmer Rouge's abuses, such as Tuol Sleng prison facility, and widely publicized them.

Views on the Cambodian-Vietnamese War in Cambodia today are divided. There are those who believe that Vietnam's intervention helped free Cambodia from the Khmer Rouge's genocidal regime, while others view it as an invasion and occupation that served Vietnam's own interests in Cambodia.

=== Recent events ===
In 2005, Vietnam and Cambodia signed a supplementary treaty to the original 1985 Treaty on Delimitation of National Boundaries, which Cambodia has deemed unacceptable. As a result, Vietnam has made several claims to Cambodian land based on the treaty that raised allegations of Vietnamese encroachment. In a statement made by a government minister of the former French Indochina colonial administration, Cambodia would have to give up two of its villages to Vietnam in return for keeping two villages Thlok Trach and Anlung Chrey, that were deemed Cambodian territory according to the 1985 treaty. It is not known which two villages Cambodia would have to give up. To resolve the dispute, in 2011, the Cambodian government announced it would speed the demarcation process with Vietnam. On 24 June 2012, Vietnam and Cambodia celebrated the demarcation of the last marker on their shared border, marker 314. Prime Ministers Nguyen Tan Dung of Vietnam and Hun Sen of Cambodia personally attended the celebration to unveil the new marker and reaffirmed the two countries' cooperation and friendship.

In July 2014, Demonstrations took place after the Vietnamese embassy stated that Kampuchea Krom (Mekong River Delta) has long been part of Vietnam, and protesters and activists demanded the embassy to apologize and recognize Kampuchea Krom as Cambodia's former territory. On 9 July, the embassy issued a statement calling for Cambodia to respect Vietnam's sovereignty and refused to apologize. Protesters burned Vietnamese flag and currency, and included the Khmer Krom community and Buddhist monks. During National Assembly president Heng Samrin's state visit to Vietnam, Vietnamese Prime Minister Nguyen Tan Dung called for Cambodia to take action against 'extremists' for the burning of the Vietnamese flag. In October 2014, protesters threatened to burn the embassy itself. Protest leader Thach Setha prevented protesters from burning Vietnam's flag, leading one protester to call him 'useless'. Around this time, a Vietnamese man, Tran Van Chien, was beaten to death by a crowd, leading to widespread fear among Vietnamese companies and investors in Cambodia. Vietnamese businesses were ransacked and pillaged by Cambodians, their workers forced to flee, and there was another instance of a Vietnamese man getting mobbed to death by a crowd.

Historically, anti-Vietnamese sentiment have arisen over Vietnam's conquest of previously Cambodian lands. This historical anti-Vietnamese sentiment has been directed both against ethnic Vietnamese in Cambodia and against the Vietnamese country itself, leading to pro-China sentiment among the Cambodian government and the Cambodian opposition, especially on the South China Sea dispute. Previous examples of Cambodian anti-Vietnamese sentiment include the riots after the 2013 national election, which was allegedly "marred by irregularities, intimidation of members and leaders of the opposition parties". Protestors not only claimed to have been "cheated" in the election, allegations of Vietnamese nationals being brought in from Vietnam to vote in their place were brought up. Accusations of Vietnamese involvements remain common regardless of how well evidenced they may be in actuality. In 2014, critics of the CNRP have argued that the party was using the Vietnamese to gain political points. Accusations were made against the leader of the CNRP, Sam Rainsy, for using the Vietnamese as a scapegoat concerning Cambodia's national issue. " A few days before Cambodia's national election, in 2014, Nguyen Chi Dzung, head of citizen protection and legal affairs of the embassy's consular section of Vietnam, also criticized Rainsy, the opposition party leader, for "capitalizing on the ethnic issue for political gains".

Despite the antagonism, it is rare for the Vietnamese to reciprocate the sentiment.

== Economic relations ==
Since the 1990s, relations between both nations have begun to improve. Both Vietnam and Cambodia are members of multilateral regional organizations such as ASEAN and the Mekong-Ganga Cooperation. Both nations have opened and developed cross-border trade and sought to relax visa regulations to that end. Both governments have set official targets of increasing bilateral trade by 27% to US$2.3 billion by 2010 and to $6.5 billion by 2015. Viet Nam exported US$1.2 billion worth of goods to Cambodia in 2007. While Cambodia is only the 16th largest importer of Vietnamese goods, Vietnam is Cambodia's third-largest export market. In 2021, two-way trade between the countries hit nearly US$10 billion.

== Diplomatic missions ==
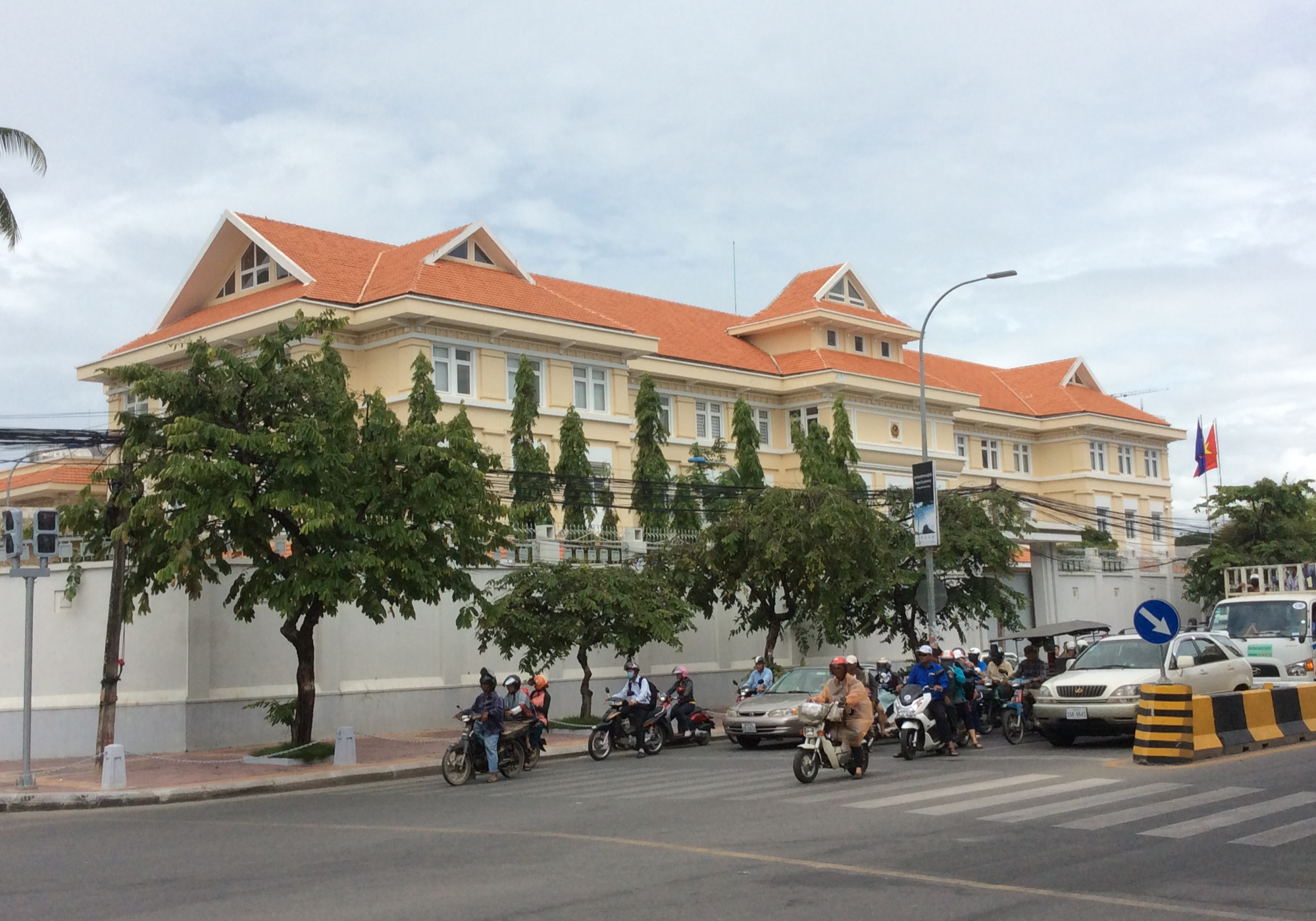
Embassy of Vietnam in Phnom Penh

- Cambodia has an embassy in Hanoi and a consulate-general in Ho Chi Minh City.
- Vietnam has an embassy in Phnom Penh and consulates-general in Battambang and in Sihanoukville.

== See also ==
- Cambodia–Vietnam border
- Cambodia–Vietnam Friendship Monument
- Degar refugees in Cambodia
- Communist Party of Vietnam
- Cambodian People's Party
