= Law of Cambodia =

The law of Cambodia refers to the legal system of the judiciary of Cambodia, which is primarily based on legal codes and statutes, with precedents and local custom also playing an important role. Cambodia has a civil law legal system with legal codes, which were greatly influenced by France, to a lesser extent by Japan, and also adapted to Cambodian circumstances. The Constitution of Cambodia enacted with the restoration of Monarchy in 1993 and it is the supreme law in Cambodia. An independent judiciary has the power to review laws and government acts for constitutionality.

== Sources of law ==
Insofar as it was difficult – and long – in 1993 to recreate a complete legal system, the one currently in force in Cambodia takes up elements of the previous regimes, as long as they do not contravene the constitution of 1993, and more recent elements, in particular to bring the political system into conformity with the rules of the market economy.

=== Constitution ===
The Constitution is the supreme law of Cambodia, therefore, all legal norms must comply with it.

Confirming the conformity of laws in the process of being adopted or already ratified falls under the authority the Constitutional Council at the request of the King, the Prime Minister, the president of one of the two parliamentary chambers, a quarter of the senators, a tenth of the deputies or a court.

The procedure for constitutional revision differs from that for laws. Its initiative belongs to the King, to the Prime Minister or to the President of the National Assembly on the proposal of at least a quarter of its members. To avoid too many changes, the modification of this fundamental law must be approved by at least two-thirds of the deputies.

In fact, since its promulgation on September 29, 1993, the constitution has undergone several revisions. First on October 14, 1994, the constitution was amended to make up for the frequent stays of Norodom Sihanouk abroad: the function of Head of State and his power of signature of official documents could be delegated in the absence of the king. Thus, the decree of October 19, 2004, creating the Khmer Rouge Tribunal or rather the Extraordinary chambers within the Cambodian courts responsible for trying the last Khmer Rouge leaders still alive was, for example, signed by Chea Sim, acting head of state in the absence of Norodom Sihanouk. On March 8, 1999, a Senate was created to solve the political crisis arising from the legislative elections of 1998.

On July 28, 2001, the King was granted the power to bestow honorary titles as that of oknha. On January 19, 2005, the constitutional revision was related to the quorum necessary for the opening of the sessions of the parliament and the investiture of the government, then, on March 9, 2006, a change in voting procedures in the National Assembly and the Senate. Finally, a modification relating to the administrative organization was approved in February 2008.

=== Custom ===
The ancient law of Cambodia was customary and oral tradition. Any legal act was accompanied by ceremonies orchestrated by the pagodas and any official had to swear loyalty to the king before taking office. Perjury was then considered one of the most serious faults. If the abolition of the monarchy in 1970 and of religion in 1975 somewhat changed the situation, these modes of operation never totally disappeared. The tradition of mediation at the municipal level remains very popular. Studies by the United Nations Educational, Scientific and Cultural Organization and the United Nations Development Program have shown the central role that village chiefs continue to play as conciliators in land, marital and proximity disputes. A study by The Asia Foundation showed 80% of neighborhood disputes are settled at the village level. In fact, this mode of settlement is almost systematically considered before bringing a case before a court of first instance. Custom even fills in some legal voids. For example, Article 23 of the Contract Law provides that if the meaning of a contractual clause is not clear, it must be interpreted according to customary usage where the contract has been concluded.

=== Continuity of Laws ===
The 1993 constitution stipulates that:

laws and normative acts (…) remain in force until new texts modify or repeal them, with the exception of provisions contrary to the spirit of the present Constitution

In fact, the United Nations Transitional Authority in Cambodia and the constitution took over a practice already in force in most of the regimes resulting from the various political upheavals that Cambodia went through in the second half of the 20th century keeping the legislative apparatus of their predecessors for a while rather than creating a break and a legal void.

=== UN Influence ===
After the signing of the 1991 Paris Peace Agreements, the various Cambodian factions claiming power agreed to delegate their sovereignty for a temporary period at the United Nations. A series of laws were enacted during this phase to ensure public order and to organize elections. An electoral code was put in place in 1992 and served as a model for the 1997 election law, still in force some twenty years later.

The adoption of a penal code on September 10, 1992, was less fortunate. While it has made it possible to set up international standards in terms of human rights and the protection of international freedoms, it was based on the principles of common law, in contradiction with the civil law traditions of Cambodia. The code was changed first on January 28, 1993, than again in 2010, but the new texts still contain some gaps, which in the name of the continuity of the laws were filled by that of 1992.

=== International Law ===
As a member of many organizations (United Nations Organization, International Monetary Fund, Group of 77, International Labour Organization, World Health Organization, Food and Agriculture Organization of the United Nations, Association of Southeast Asian Nations, World Trade Organization), Cambodia was required to join to sign unto many international treaties or conventions. The implementation process is outlined by the constitution which states that after approval by the National Assembly, the king signs the texts which are thus ratified. However, these treaties must not go against the independence, sovereignty, territorial integrity, neutrality and national unity of the kingdom under penalty of being abrogated. The Universal Declaration of Human Rights as well as the texts relating to those of women and children occupy a special place, however, since their respect is guaranteed by the constitution.

=== Legislation ===
Legislative power is shared between the National Assembly and the Senate. The role of the second is to examine the laws adopted at first reading by the lower house and to issue, if necessary, proposals for amendments are approved by the deputies before the text is definitively promulgated. In addition, some areas, such as approval of the state budget or international treaties as well as constitutional amendments are the sole competence of the National Assembly. Finally, the rules of procedure of the two chambers of the parliament as well as the organic laws are subject to an automatic review by the Constitutional Council.

However, if according to the constitution the initiative for laws is shared between the parliaments and the government, in practise it has been left to the latter which, before submitting a draft, has it prepared by the competent ministerial cabinet and reviewed by a group of lawyers. The fact that neither the deputies nor the senate have such means or skills can explain the low number of texts that they have introduced or which give rise to real discussions.

=== Case law ===
The constitution states that:

judges must fulfill their duties in strict compliance with the law

Judges are therefore content to apply the texts and when they justify their decisions, they limit themselves to setting out the facts relating to the case. The judicial rule of precedent does not apply and the verdicts rendered must concern only the parties present at the trial. In fact, this absence of jurisprudence can lead to contradictory decisions when trying similar cases by two different courts. If the Supreme Court has in its objectives a harmonization of sentences, the results were still awaited in the mid-2010s.

== Branches of Law ==
=== Civil Law ===
The civil procedure code currently in force in Cambodia dates from 2007 while the civil code entered into force in December 2011.

Civil law perfectly incorporates the frequent recourse to conciliation in use in most Asian countries. Thus, before initiating proceedings, the judge will attempt mediation between the parties. It is supported in this in rural areas by local offices located at the level of phum or villages and srok or districts and representative of traditional social values. The trial only takes place if the conciliation has failed and the judge takes his decision in accordance with the law in force or, if that fails, according to the custom where the dispute takes place.

=== Criminal Law ===
The Criminal Procedure Code currently in force dates from 2002, while the penal procedure code entered into force in December 2010.

Cambodian criminal law is based on the inquisitorial system. At the end of 2013, it was based on 23 provincial and municipal tribunals of first instance, a military tribunal, a court of cassation and a supreme court.

Public action is reserved for the prosecution and operations of the judicial police take place at the request of the prosecutor. In accordance with civil law tradition and to the great displeasure of Anglo-Saxon organizations and governments, the investigation is entrusted to a judge. During trials, the public prosecutor merely asks for the application of the law. The decisions of the provincial and municipal courts may be appealed within two months after the verdict is pronounced except those decreed by default which may be challenged within two weeks after the convicted person has knowledge of his sentence.

=== Administrative Law ===
The constitution recognizes that every Khmer citizen has the right to denounce, lodge a complaint or claim reparations for damages caused by illegal activities of state bodies, social bodies and the staff of these bodies. In addition, by declaring the judiciary competent for all disputes, including administrative litigation, it confirms the uniqueness of this jurisdiction.

Such a choice was, in the mind of the settlor, motivated by two major reasons, namely the fear of creating an overly complex system and the lack of qualified personnel. The first argument was based on the experience of the Krom Viveat, set up in 1924 to manage conflicts with the administration. Their lack of power, the slowness of the procedures and the competition of amicable arrangements between citizens and the hierarchy of the administrators at fault will permanently hindered their effectiveness. Their weak activity lead to their removal in 1970. The second argument which was true in 1993, seems less accurate years later, as the teaching of the Royal School of the judiciary founded by Kim Sathavy in 2002 makes the complexities of public law more accessible to judges. The need for specific bodies appeared very quickly and chambers dedicated to administrative disputes were created within the Court of Cassation, which manages these disputes at first instance, and the Supreme Court. In addition, the establishment on March 10, 1994, by Norodom Ranariddh and Hun Sen, of a board of jurists to review draft laws in the ministries and review the texts already applied to propose amendments, completes the de facto arsenal of specialized bodies.

=== Commercial law ===
Cambodia's accession to the World Trade Organization on October 13, 2004, compelled it to pass a number of laws to ensure free competition and regulate investments, but these international texts did not apply to local businesses for which they were too complex and costly. Cambodian people prefer to continue using traditional Chinese-inspired practices; the tontine thus remains the most common means of obtaining a credit, dealings with civil servants is the common way of setting taxes and physical constraint the way of settling disputes. Mostly foreign companies are duly registered, pay the taxes provided for by the texts or settle their disputes in court. But that does not prevent them from having to deal with corruption and if they decide not to bribe a few officials, they would have little chance of seeing their project succeed.

This business code also suffers, like other areas of Cambodian law, from competition between donor countries, each wishing to take advantage of the opportunity offered by development aid to try to impose its model. Thus the World Bank, strongly inspired by the Anglo-Saxon countries, regularly calls into question the legal framework based on the French system and which is considered as a brake on productivity and investment, generating more unemployment and encouraging corruption. The World Bank advocates a deregulation that would eliminate or reduce what is perceived as obstacles to economic development, such as the existence of a minimum wage, the intervention of the courts in commercial matters or the absence of protection of creditors.

== Evaluation ==
Law in Cambodia suffers from problems that are related to the judiciary of Cambodia while other problems are more specific to the law itself, namely the origin of the law and the extra-legal practise of reconciliation in Cambodia.

=== Origin of law ===
Massive international aid that since the beginning of the 90s has made it possible to profoundly overhaul the judicial system but has also had perverse effects. Thus, the diversity of donors leads to a certain cacophony, each seeming more concerned with imposing their views than ensuring the consistency of the texts proposed, without even carrying out sociological studies to ensure that the new laws are adapted to the local context. Thus the project to create a commercial court under the aegis of the World Bank was stopped at the last moment because the procedures it provided for went against the rules of the civil rights and criminal law prepared by the Japanese and the French. Moreover, these disputes frequently move towards the local administrations, creating quarrels by proxy, as for the debates on the establishment of the role of the examining magistrate wanted by the Ministry of Justice supported by France but fought by the Cambodian Ministry of Interior aided by Anglo- Saxons parties who saw it as a limitation of the power of the police in the conduct of criminal investigations. This resulted in laws being adopted sparingly; moreover, a lack of political will regularly invoked to explain this slowness does not seem to be the only reason for this.

These laws of foreign origin are also not always translated appropriately and it is not uncommon for lawyers to have to take a text in its original language to find its meaning and refer to the law of the country from which it is issue to know how to interpret it.

=== Reconciliation ===
A major element already mentioned in the Cambodian context is the reduced use of the judiciary due to the still very much alive tradition of favoring a negotiated solution to settle a dispute, rather than relying on the decisions of a justice that many consider incompetent, expensive, ignorant of local customs and whose moral authority is not always recognized. To this habit, one can add the ever-widespread belief that recourse to the court could upset the cosmic order populated by not always benevolent geniuses or neak ta. It is common to see Khmer people celebrate a mystical ceremony to ensure the good graces of these deities and preserve the harmony between them and the world of mortals.

Another problem linked to local traditions concerns the religious aspect and the conviction that the faults committed in one existence will be expiated after death, possibly in a new life. Thus, Tep Vong, Buddhist Patriarch of Cambodia publicly denounced the Khmer Rouge Tribunal considering that any form of judgement would be an act of revenge and that the penalty they could incur would never be equal to what their karma will reserve for them after their death.

== Bibliography ==
- Becker, Peter (February 3, 2014). Introduction on The Civil Code of Cambodia. GRIN Verlag. ISBN 978-3-656-58746-0.
- Coghill, Stuart (2000). Resource Guide to the Criminal Law of Cambodia. International Human Rights Law Group.
- Jennar, Raoul Marc (1994). Les Constitutions du Cambodge, 1953–1993 (in French). Documentaton française. ISBN 978-2-11-003177-8.
- Levasseur, Alain A. et al., eds. The legal system of Cambodia. Durham, NC: Carolina Academic Press, 2025.
- Rendall, Matthew (2003). Land Law of Cambodia: A Study and Research Manual. East-West Management Institute, Asian Development Bank.
- Sok, Siphana (1998). Labor Law in Cambodia. Cambodian Legal Resource Development Center.
- Sok, Siphana (1998). Laws of Cambodia. Cambodian Legal Resources Development Center.
- Sok, Siphana; Denora, Sarin (1998). The Legal System of Cambodia. Cambodian Legal Resources Development Center.
