= Judiciary of Cambodia =

Judicial system of Cambodia

The Judiciary of Cambodia is independent from the rest of the government of Cambodia, as specified by the Cambodian Constitution. The judiciary follows civil law tradition, the instruction being entrusted to a judge and the prosecutors contenting themselves with requesting the application of the law.

Courts and tribunals in Cambodia regularly face a lack of resources, both financial and human, a ferment of corruption and clientelism that eat away at the whole of society. The difficulty of access for the poorest also favors the resistance of traditional methods of conflict resolution, based on the intermediary of a person whose moral authority, unlike that of the judge, is not contested by neither of the two parties (village, district, pagoda chiefs, etc.), de facto creating a two-tier system, one, official, reserved for foreigners and urban elites, the other, informal, for the most part population.

== History ==
=== Funan: a rudimentary system of Indian influence ===
Before the establishment of the Khmer Empire, it seems like the civilization of Funan had a rudimentary judiciary with probably a legal code of Indian origin. Trial by ordeal existed and innocence could be decided "if a suspect was not eaten after being thrown to the ubiquitous crocodiles."

=== Khmer Empire: an extended judiciary network ===
In Khmer inscriptions of the tenth and eleventh century, there are indications of well established judiciary in the Angkorian Empire. From the texts, it can be interpreted that the king was personally involved but given the location of these inscriptions, it is likely that the courts were delegated to act on behalf of the ruler. According to Eileen Lustig, "sites with mentions of the royal service, courts, and court officials are distributed in much the same way as non-royal inscriptions, suggesting a relatively even administration of taxation and the law."

The first written traces of laws are Dharmashastra that appeared during the indianization of the Indochinese peninsula between the second and the thirteenth century, but these texts are above all codes of conduct respectful of secular customs and devoid of directive character. Moreover, when at the end of the nineteenth century French people such as Adhémard Leclère did research on the laws of the Angkorian period, they realize that they are for the most part unknown to magistrates. In fact, corruption with the nepotism practices and clientelism attached to it made the laws particularly inaudible.

=== Justice under the French Protectorate of Cambodia: the first attempts of codification ===
French colonization aimed to transform Cambodia, to guide the Khmer people towards the idea of progress as defined by the French protectorate. The Protectorate saw the first real attempts at codification but these codes were often in contradiction with the laws enacted in metropolis or those which applied to the whole of French Indochina. The opinions, orders and other decrees issued by the various legislative bodies were streamlined on 1 June 1940 by creating a hierarchy between them. At the highest level was now the Kram which derived from the sole monarch and had a general legislative scope; the Kret was also the work of the king, but covered the appointments, transfers and dismissals of senior officials. The Samrach related to a decision taken by the Council of Ministers. The Prakas came for their part from a minister and applied to his field of activity while the Deka had only a local value (province, district, commune...).

=== Under the Khmer Rouge ===
Codification continued after the independence, led by Cambodian lawyers trained at the Faculty of Law where courses were partly given by French professors in French.

Under the regime of Democratic Kampuchea, the judiciary had “power” only in name. Closely linked to politics, the National Committee for Justice officially came into force at the end of the single session of the Assembly of the Representatives of the People of Kampuchea (April 11–13, 1976) which, according to the article 9 of the Constitution, also had the task of appointing "magistrates at all levels (of the hierarchy)”. The “ministry” was chaired by Kang Chap, elected according to the rule of democratic centralism. Justice was to be rendered by the people's courts, which were supposed to defend the democratic rights and freedoms of the people and which actually condemned any action directed against the State. Unlike the Soviet Union or the Socialist Republic of Việt Nam, Democratic Kampuchea stood out from other communist states on the planet by the absence of its judicial system. No tribunal nor court of any sort was ever invested with the power to render justice.

Most of the players in the old judicial bodies did not survive this period and the restoration of institutions is still in progress. With the fall of Democratic Kampuchea in 1979, popular revolutionary courts were finally created, but it was not until 1982 that a more elaborate judicial system was put in place. A network of provincial courts was born, dependent on a popular supreme court at the national level, which became the instance of appeal. A decree-law of July 13, 1982 completed the whole by creating a hierarchy at the level of the texts of laws. The laws or Chbab emanated from the Council of State (under the Presidency of the Republic) and had to be approved by the National Assembly to be proclaimed or, if its application could not wait for the next parliamentary session, by decree-law. The latter did not need a promulgation and takes effect as soon as it is signed. In return, it is repealed if it goes against a Chhbap. The decree or anukret for its part would come from the Council of Ministers but could not oppose one of the two texts mentioned above. Each minister or head of a public body could, at his level, enact an order or prakas, while the revolutionary committees can issued decisions or sachkdei samrach in compliance with any of the acts mentioned above.

=== Monarchy Restored ===
In 1992, the United Nations Transitional Authority in Cambodia added to the provincial jurisdictions already created an appellate court which was also invested with the power to review the judgments of the military tribunal and whose decisions could be challenged before a supreme court. This reform was also accompanied by a reorganization of the texts, but in view of the task to be accomplished, it was preferable to sort, among those of the previous regimes, those which would be repealed and those to be retained. The 1993 constitution restored a parliamentary monarchy retained the order of the legal texts adopted by the People's Republic of Kampuchea. However, the royal Kram which had been repealed in 1970 now reappeared, with the limited power of promulgation of the laws voted by the parliament.

At the same time, the law was profoundly overhauled by international aid. Many bodies responsible for organizing and guaranteeing the independence of institutions were then created (superior council of the judiciary, bar of lawyers, council of the order, etc.). But these implementations, by calling into question the previously established systems of influence, regularly lead to crises such as the quarrel between Ky Tech and Suon Visal, which disrupted the functioning of the bar for several years or the accusations of partiality of the Superior Council of the Judiciary after the transfer, in March 2004, of Judge Hing Thirith.

The establishment in 2006 of the extraordinary chambers in the courts of Cambodia, a local jurisdiction with minority international participation responsible for judging the last leaders of the Khmers Rouges helped to accelerate the establishment of institutions closer to international standards.

Surya Subedi, then rapporteur for the United Nations Commissioner for Human Rights, noted in his report of August 2014 that progress could still be made.

In fact, the assessment made in 2006 by Antoine Fontaine, project manager of the Embassy of France for legal cooperation with the Royal University of Law and Economics of Phnom Penh, showing that:

the path that leads to the rule of law is still a long time and Cambodia is barely beginning to borrow it

is still relevant years later.

== Structure ==
The main duties of the judiciary are to prosecute criminals, settle lawsuits, and, most importantly, protect the freedoms and rights of Cambodian citizens. However, in reality, the judicial branch in Cambodia is highly corrupt and often serves as a tool of the executive branch to silence civil society and its leaders. Until 1997, Cambodia did not have a judicial branch of government despite the nation's Constitution requiring one.

=== Hierarchy of courts ===
The judicial power is entrusted in the first instance to the provincial courts and then to the Court of Cassation and the Supreme Court. It is based on a single jurisdictional order and each of these bodies rules on cases that fall under both civil law and criminal law, commercial law or social law. Provincial courts, or municipal courts for cities with special status such as Phnom Penh or Sihanoukville, are composed of a judge, a prosecutor and a clerk.

The Court of Appeal (Sala Outor) sits in the capital. In the mid-2010s, two more instances opened in Battambang and Siem Reap. In addition to appeals against provincial court cases, it also judges administrative disputes at first instance. In addition to the institution in charge of this type of case, the court has four other chambers, specializing respectively in civil, criminal, commercial and investigation. Its decisions are rendered by a group of three magistrates; the attributions of the public ministry fall to the public prosecutor at the court of appeal.

The Supreme Court of Cambodia (Tolakar Kampoul) rules as a last resort on cases tried on appeal, but can only rule on defects in legal procedure. It is composed of a civil chamber and a criminal chamber. Decisions are pronounced collegially usually by 5 magistrates or 9 magistrates in a plenary judgement while the functions of the public ministry fall to the public prosecutor at the supreme court. Finally, the Supreme Council of the Judiciary holds judicial power in the last instance. It is supposed to guarantee the independence of the judiciary and intervenes in matters relating to the promotions, transfers and remuneration of judges; it must also deal with complaints and decide, if necessary, on disciplinary sanctions against magistrates. Its organization and functioning have been redefined by a law promulgated in July 2014 which notably increased the proportion of judges sitting on the Supreme Court.

The highest court of judicial branch is the Supreme Council of the Magistracy. There are currently 17 justices on the Supreme Council.

=== Administrative acts ===
The administrative acts are organized according to a hierarchy inherited from the People's Republic of Kampuchea. At its top is the Kret, a decree signed by the king and countersigned by the prime minister and the minister concerned. It is in fact the act of promulgation of a Chhbap voted by parliament. Anukret is a sub-decree passed by the government and initialed by the prime minister and the minister responsible for its application. The Prakas are taken by a minister or the Governor of the central bank while the decision of sachkdei samrach is initiated by a member of the government (including the secretary of state) or the president of a public institution. An internal order called circulaire or sorachor is prescribed by a central administration for its local offices. Its purpose is to clarify a legal text by indicating the interpretation to be given to it or to define a policy in a given area. Finally, the Deka has a more limited scope and is the work of a provincial governor or a head of municipality.

=== People in the judiciary ===
==== Prosecutors ====
The Public Prosecutor's Office is the only body authorized to prosecute, but cannot judge cases. Prosecutors are subordinate to the Attorney General who receives his instructions from the Ministry of Justice and must send him an activity report every year. In order to put an end to the confusion which then prevailed, the Superior Council of the Judiciary decided, on July 11, 2005, the administrative separation between the judges in charge of investigating cases and those conducting the trials.

==== Judges ====
In 2003, Judge Kim Sathavy was in charge of establishing the first Royal School for Judges and Prosecutors to train a new generation of magistrates and legal clerks for Cambodia. Since then, judges and prosecutors are recruited by a competition open to any law graduate and after having undergone training at the Royal School of Magistracy.

==== Lawyers ====
The lawyers are grouped in an order governed by the Kram of 22 and inspired by its French counterpart. At its head is a general assembly, a council of the order and a batonnier elected for a two-year term renewable once. Applicants to the profession must be of Cambodian nationality, have obtained a certificate of aptitude for the career of lawyer and a law degree or an equivalent diploma and not have been convicted of a criminal offense. They must then complete a one-year internship in a firm and include additional training. Finally, to ensure their independence, lawyers are required not to exercise a commercial activity or a job in the public service in Southeast Asia or in any political and jurisdictional Institutions in Cambodia.
