= Barrault =

Barrault is a French patronymic surname. Notable people with the name include:

- Alexis Barrault (1812–1865), French engineer
- Doug Barrault (born 1970), Canadian ice hockey player
- François Barrault (born 1960), French businessman
- Jean-Louis Barrault (1910–1994), French actor, theatre director, and mime artist
- Marie-Christine Barrault (born 1944), French actress

== See also ==
- Barraud
- Barre (name)
- Barreau
- Barriere
