= Constitutional Council (Cambodia) =

Judicial court of Cambodia

Constitutional Council of Cambodia
- ក្រុមប្រឹក្សាធម្មនុញ្ញ
- Established: 24 September 1993; 32 years ago
- Jurisdiction: Cambodia
- Location: Chamkarmon State Palace; Phnom Penh, Cambodia
- Authorised by: Constitution of Cambodia
- Number of positions: 9
- Website: https://www.ccc.gov.kh/index_en.php

President of the Constitutional Council
- Currently: Im Chhun Lim
- Since: 2016

The Constitutional Council of Cambodia (Khmer: ក្រុមប្រឹក្សាធម្មនុញ្ញ) is a judicial body in the government of Cambodia. The council was established with the Constitution of Cambodia on September 24, 1993. The President of the Council is Im Chhun Lim.

== Composition ==
According to Article 92/Chapter XII of the Constitution of Cambodia, and the Law on the Organization and Functioning of the Constitutional Council, the council consists of 9 members.

- The King of Cambodia appoints three members by royal decree.
- The Supreme Council of the Magistracy elects three members and is later appointed by the King through royal decree.
- The National Assembly elects three members and is later appointed by the King through royal decree.
