= Kbal Chhay Waterfall =

Waterfall in Cambodia

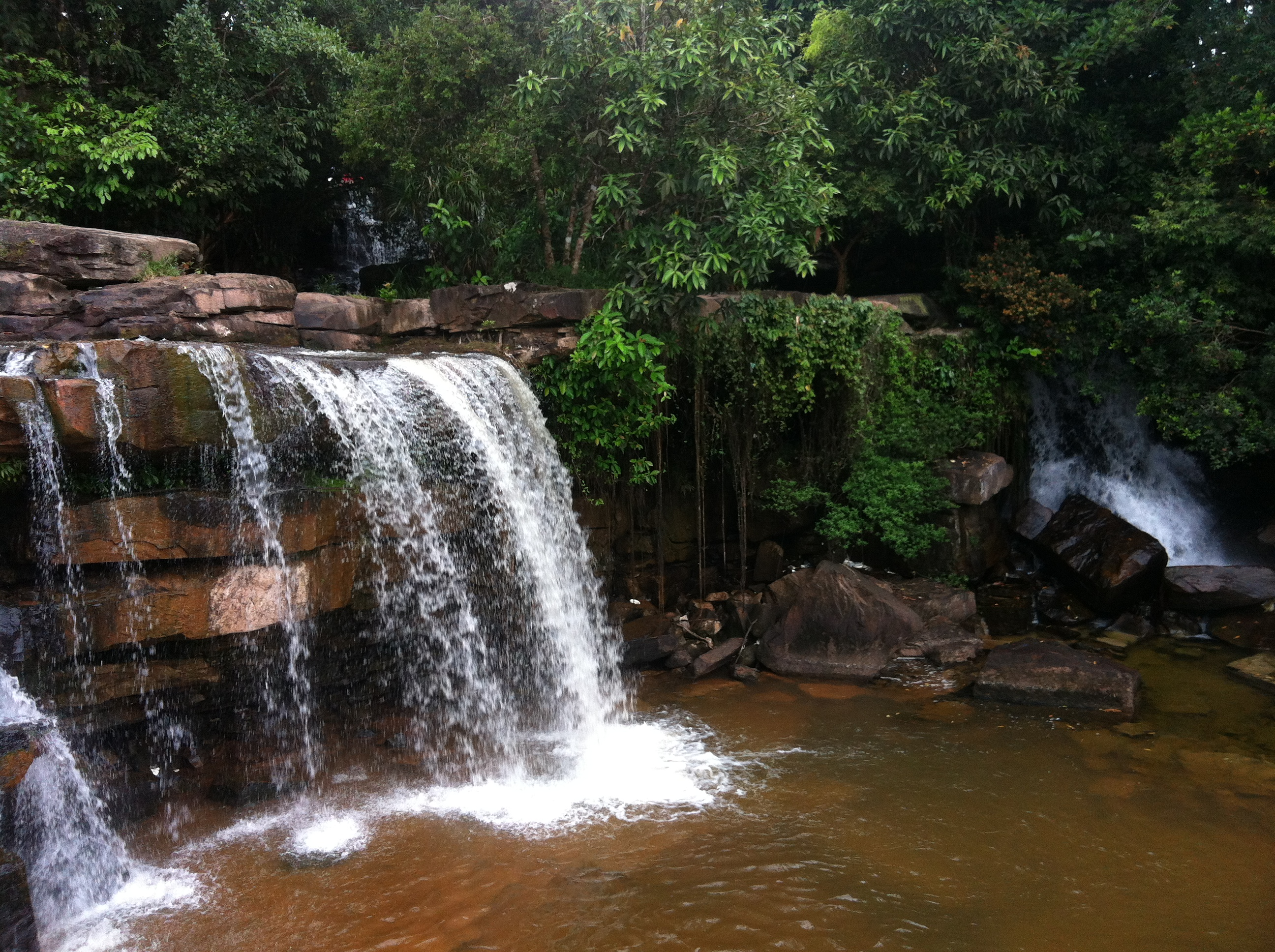
Kbal Chhay Waterfall

Kbal Chhay Waterfall is a waterfall approximately 7 km from the city of Sihanoukville in south-west Cambodia and then a further 9 km along a red dust track.

Until 1963 Kbal Chhay was a source for providing clean-water to Sihanoukville, but the arrangement ended when it became a hiding place for the Khmer Rouge.

In 1998 Kbal Chhay was developed by the Kok An Company who in constructing a road in the area developed the site for local and international tourists. Today the Royal Government of Cambodia has regained control of the site and once again uses it as a clean water source for the nearby city.

== See also ==
- List of waterfalls
