= Supreme Court of Cambodia =

Highest court of Cambodia

- តុលាការកំពូល
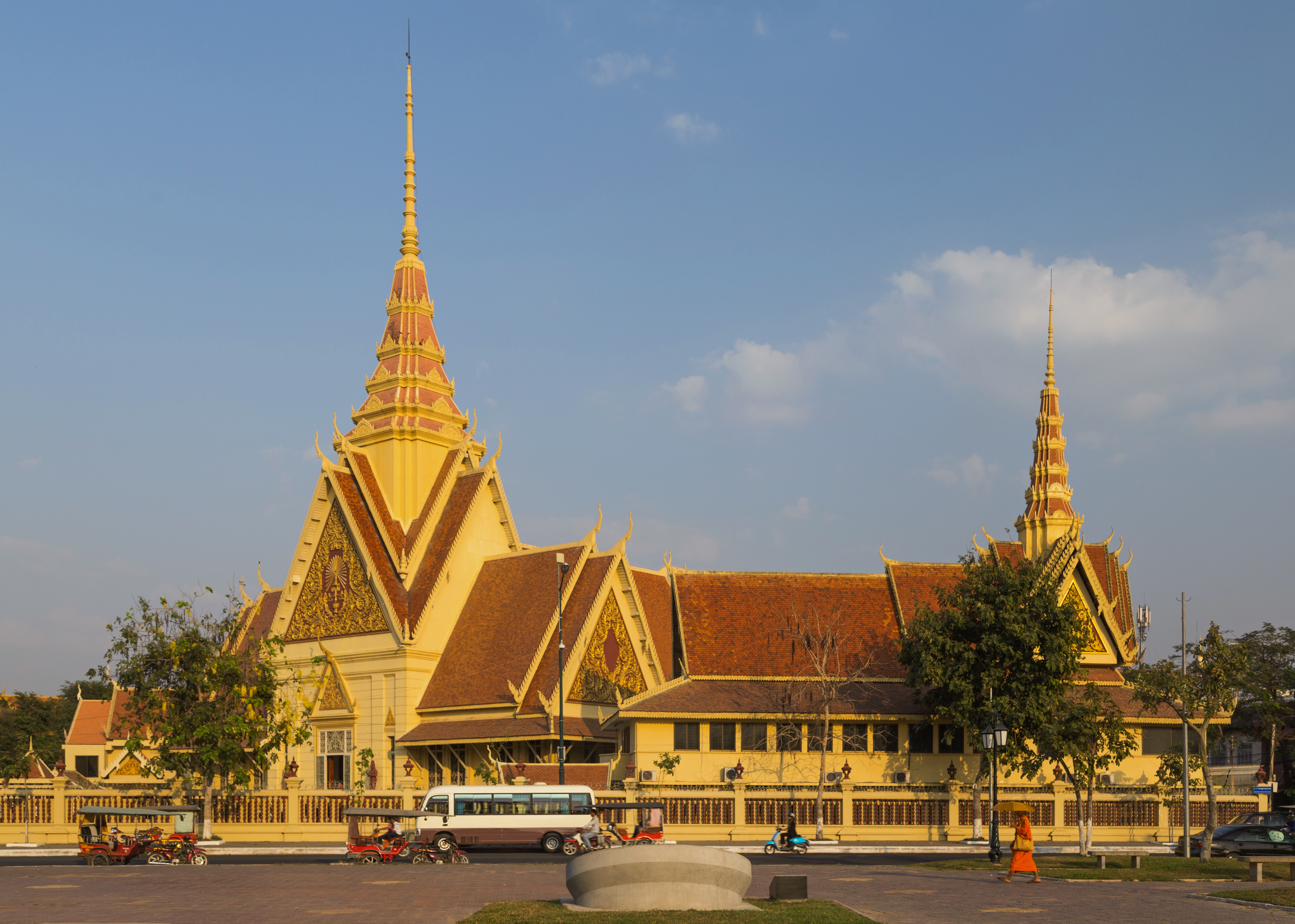
- Established: 22 December 1994
- Location: Phnom Penh, Cambodia
- Composition method: Royal decree
- Authorised by: Constitution of Cambodia
- Judge term length: 5 years (renewable)
- Number of positions: 9

Chairman
- Currently: His Royal Highness Norodom Sihamoni
- Since: 14 October 2004

President
- Currently: His Excellency Chiv Keng
- Since: 15 August 2023

The Supreme Court of Cambodia is the highest court in the judiciary of Cambodia, under the supervision of the Supreme Council of the Magistrature. It is located in the royal capital of Phnom Penh, and is regulated under Article 55 to Article 73 of the 2014 Cambodian Law on Court Organization.

== History ==
After coming to Power in 1975, the Khmer Rouge destroyed the Cambodian legal system. It was rebuilt from scratch starting in 1992.

In 1989, a new constitution was promulgated that emphasized some fundamental freedoms and the rule of law. Under the State of Cambodia government, an overlapping relationship between the judicial and executive branches remained, which was inherited from the colonial system. The People's Supreme Court then reported this to the National Assembly of Cambodia stating that "the work of receiving and resolving suits is a matter of ideology". In June 1998, Dith Munthy replaced Chan Sok as president of Cambodia's Supreme Court.

In the early 2000s, the Supreme Court of Cambodia was still struggling with financial difficulties and structural deficiencies, acknowledging lack of funds meant that there were some difficulties in arranging travel for witnesses in criminal trials. There was also a lack of judges with specialist training. In 2003, heading the Directorate of the Royal School for Judges and Prosecutors, Kim Sathavy oversaw the recruitment of the first the intake of the 50 first student judges of the new school, before herself being the first woman to join the Supreme Court in May 2006.

The Supreme Court of Cambodia has been criticized for not being independent of the Government, led by the Cambodian People's Party. In 2014, it was noted that judicial reform laws in Cambodia were not in line with international standards by the International Commission of Jurists. In a 2021 report of the United Nations, it was noted that "the fact that the Cambodian Co- Prosecutor of the ECCC, Chea Leang, is the Prosecutor General of the Supreme Court of Cambodia, and also thereby a member of the Supreme Council of the Magistracy, adds a further layer of conflict of interest."

== Khmer Rouge Tribunal ==
The Extraordinary Chambers in the Courts of Cambodia for the Prosecution of Crimes Committed during the Period of Democratic Kampuchea (ECCC) were established in 2004 within the Trial Court and the Supreme Court of Cambodia. The Extraordinary Chambers while often referred to as 'hybrid', 'mixed' or 'internationalized' courts on account of their composition, jurisdiction ratione materiae, and applicable law—are once more formally municipal criminal courts. As their name makes clear, they are special chambers 'established in the existing court structure, namely the trial court and the supreme court', of Cambodia, and the trial court and supreme court of Cambodia are established and empowered under the law of Cambodia. This original system has been compared to the national tribunal for international crimes court system in Bangladesh.
