= Ky Tech =

Cambodian lawyer

Ky Tech (គី តិច) is a Cambodian lawyer. He is currently the head of the Cambodian Government Lawyers Council and the lawyer for the Council of Ministers and Prime Minister Hun Sen.

== Biography ==
Ky Tech was a legal clerk at the Supreme Court of Cambodia before being recruited by Prime Minister Hun Sen to become his legal aide.

In 2004, Ky Tech inaugurated in presence of Hun Sen the new headquarters of the Cambodian Bar Association on Street 180 in Phnom Penh, which was paid for by the government of Cambodia.

On October 16, 2004, Ky Tech lost an election to be reelected as head of the Cambodian Bar Association, and after that election was challenged, he was confirmed in that position in October 2006, promising to reform the Cambodian Bar.

In 2009, Ky Tech was involved in a controversy with Kong Sam Onn, another prominent Cambodian lawyer, which considered by the World Organisation Against Torture to be a form a judicial harassment. Ky Tech alleged in his complaint that Kong Sam Onn violated Bar Association rules by asserting during a press conference held April 23, 2009 that Hun Sen had defamed Mu Sochua, three days before she filed a defamation complaint against Cambodian prime Minister.

On February 3, 2018, Ky Tech was elevated to the rank of minister by acting head of state Say Chhum.

Ky Tech led the legal team that won the widely condemned dissolution of the Cambodia National Rescue Party at the Supreme Court in November 2018, which received the criticism of the Ou Chanrith, of the CNRP, who accused the Cambodian court to be beholden to Ky Tech. The latter had defended the disbanding of the CNRP as necessary to preserve the Cambodian nation which the opposition party was dividing.

In 2019, Ky Tech recruited a female-dominated team of about 30 pro bono lawyers known as “Samdech Hun Sen Legal Team”, headquartered at the Council of Ministers, in order to provide free legal counseling to disadvantaged women in Cambodia.

In 2020, amidst concerns for freedom of the press in Cambodia, Ky Tech offered to provide legal aid to journalists belonging to media institutions registered at Cambodia’s Ministry of Information and are “complying with professional code of conducts as well as concerned (about) laws and regulations in Cambodia.”
