= Barreau =

Barreau is a French surname. Notable people with the surname include:

- Andre Barreau, musician
- Gaston Barreau (1883–1958), French football player and coach
- Gisèle Barreau (born 1948), French composer
- Jean-Claude Barreau (1933–2025), French essayist and writer
- Rose-Alexandrine Barreau (1773–1843), French soldier

== See also ==
- François Dominique Barreau de Chefdeville (1725–1765), French architect
- Barrault, people bearing that surname
