= Barrier River (disambiguation) =

Barrier River may refer to:

- Barrier River, a river in New Zealand
- Barrier River (Saskatchewan), a river in Canada

== See also ==
- Barrière River
