= Politics of Cambodia =

The politics of Cambodia are defined within the framework of a constitutional monarchy, in which the king serves as the head of state, and the prime minister is the head of government. In practice, Cambodia is an authoritarian state, as power is centralized in the hands of the Cambodian People's Party (CPP) under leader Hun Manet. Civil society groups, independent media and opposition parties are repressed, and elections are not free and fair.

The collapse of communism set in motion events that led to the withdrawal of the Vietnamese armed forces, which had established their presence in the country since the fall of the Khmer Rouge. The 1993 constitution, which is currently in force, was promulgated as a result of the 1991 Paris Peace Agreements, followed by elections organized under the aegis of the United Nations Transitional Authority in Cambodia. The constitution declares Cambodia to be an "independent, sovereign, peaceful, permanently neutral and non-aligned country." The constitution also proclaims a liberal, multiparty democracy in which powers are devolved to the executive, the judiciary and the legislature. However, there is no effective opposition to the Prime Minister, a position long held by Hun Sen, from 1984 until 2023, and now held by his son. Their Cambodian People's Party won all 125 seats in the National Assembly in 2018 after the banning of opposition party CNRP and KNLF. KNLF became a main opposition exiled in Denmark after CNRP was dissolved. During the communal election in 2022 and the national election in 2023, there were no international observers. The government is considered to be autocratic.

Executive power is exercised by the Royal Government, on behalf of and with the consent of the monarch. The government is constituted of the Council of Ministers, headed by the prime minister. The prime minister is aided in his functions by members of the Council such as deputy prime ministers, senior ministers and other ministers. Legislative power is vested in a bicameral legislature composed of the National Assembly, which has the power to vote on draft law, and the Senate, that has the power of review. Upon passage of legislation through the two chambers, the draft law is presented to the monarch for signing and promulgation. The judiciary is tasked with the protection of rights and liberties of the citizens, and with being an impartial arbiter of disputes. The Supreme Court is the highest court of the country and takes appeals from lower courts on questions of law. A separate body called the Constitutional Council was established to provide interpretations of the constitution and the laws, and also to resolve disputes related to election of members of the legislature.

The Cambodian People's Party has dominated the political landscape since the 1997 coup d'état in Phnom Penh. Other prominent political parties include the royalist FUNCINPEC and the erstwhile Cambodia National Rescue Party that was dissolved by the Supreme Court in 2017. Comparative political scientists Steven Levitsky and Lucan Way have described Cambodia as a "competitive authoritarian regime", a hybrid regime type with important characteristics of both democracy and authoritarianism.

In the July 2023 election, the ruling Cambodian People's Party (CPP) easily won by a landslide in flawed election, after disqualification of Cambodia's most important opposition, Candlelight Party. On 22 August 2023, Hun Manet, son of Hun Sen, was sworn in as the new Cambodian prime minister.

== Legal framework ==
Cambodia is a constitutional monarchy with a unitary structure and a parliamentary form of government. The constitution, which prescribes the governing framework, was promulgated in September 1993 by the Constituent Assembly that resulted from the 1993 general election conducted under the auspices of the United Nations Transitional Authority in Cambodia (UNTAC). The assembly adopted the basic principles and measures mandated under the Paris Peace Agreements into the text of the constitution. Assimilated into the governing charter, these provisions place the constitution as the supreme law of the land; declare Cambodia's status as a sovereign, independent and neutral state; enshrine a liberal, multi-party democracy with fair and periodic elections; guarantee respect for human rights; and provide for an independent judiciary.

The brutality of the Democratic Kampuchea regime had especially necessitated the inclusion of provisions concerning human rights in order to prevent a return to the policies and practices of the past. These criteria had been drawn from the Namibian constitution drafting process that took place in 1982. German constitutional law scholar, Jörg Menzel, characterized these benchmarks as the "necessary nucleus of a modern constitutional state." The constitution further sanctifies the status of international law in the issue of human rights by binding Cambodia to "respect" the provisions of human rights treaties adopted by the UN. The 1993 constitution has been amended eight times since its passage – in 1994, 1999, 2001, 2005, 2006, 2008, 2014 and 2018.

=== Separation of powers ===
The powers are devolved to three branches of the state: the legislature, the executive and the judiciary, in recognition of the doctrine of separation of powers. Political sovereignty rests with the Cambodian people, who exercise their power through the three arms of the state. The Royal Government, which wields executive power, is directly responsible to the National Assembly. The judiciary, which is an independent power, is tasked with the protection of citizens' rights and liberties. Buddhism is proclaimed as the state religion.

=== Influences on legal system ===
The legal system of Cambodia is civil law and has been strongly influenced by the legal heritage of France as a consequence of colonial rule. The Soviet-Vietnamese system dominated the country from 1981 until 1989, and Sri Lankan jurist Basil Fernando argues that its elements are present in the current system as well. The role of customary law, based on Buddhist beliefs and unwritten law drawn from the Angkorean period, is also prevalent.

=== Market economy ===
The constitution contains a commitment to the "market economy system", which along with accompanying provisions effects a fundamental change in the role of the state from the past. Security of private property and the right to sell and exchange freely, necessary conditions for the functioning of the market economy, are provided for. The state's powers of expropriation are limited to the extent they serve public interest, to be exercised only when "fair and just" compensation is made in advance. Operating under the slogan Le Cambodge s'aide lui-même or "Cambodia will help itself", one of the earliest undertakings of the Royal Government was to implement programs to ensure the economic rehabilitation of Cambodia and its integration in the regional and global economies. On 10 March 1994, the Royal Government declared an "irreversible and irrevocable" move away from a centrally-planned economy towards a market-oriented economy.

== Monarchy ==
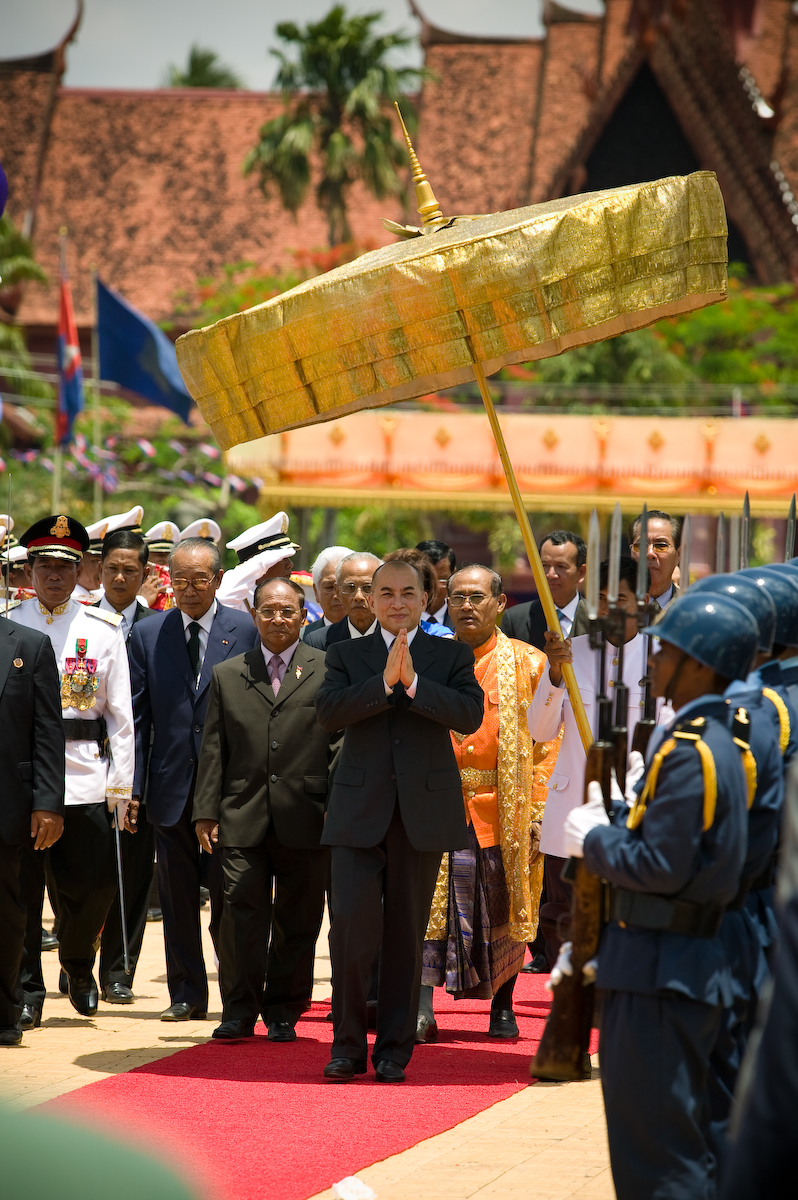
King Norodom Sihamoni

Cambodia is a constitutional monarchy. The king is officially the head of state and is the symbol of unity and "perpetuity" of the nation, as defined by Cambodia's constitution.

From September 24, 1993, through October 7, 2004, Norodom Sihanouk reigned as king, after having previously served in a number of offices (including king) since 1941. Under the constitution, the king has no political power, but as Norodom Sihanouk was revered in the country, his word often carried much influence in the government. The king, often irritated over the conflicts in his government, several times threatened to abdicate unless the political factions in the government got along. This put pressure on the government to solve their differences. This influence of the king was often used to help mediate differences in government.

After the abdication of King Norodom Sihanouk in 2004, he was succeeded by his son Norodom Sihamoni. While the retired king was highly revered in his country for dedicating his lifetime to Cambodia, the current king has spent most of his life abroad in France. Thus, it remains to be seen whether the new king's views will be as highly respected as his father's.

Although in the Khmer language there are many words meaning "king", the word officially used in Khmer (as found in the 1993 Cambodian constitution) is preăhmôhaksăt (Khmer regular script: ព្រះមហាក្សត្រ), which literally means: preăh- ("excellent", cognate of the Pali word vara) -môha- (from Sanskrit, meaning "great", cognate with "maha-" in maharaja) -ksăt ("warrior, ruler", cognate of the Sanskrit word kṣatrá).

On the occasion of King Norodom Sihanouk's retirement in September 2004, the Cambodian National Assembly coined a new word for the retired king: preăhmôhavireăkksăt (Khmer regular script: ព្រះមហាវីរក្សត្រ), where vireăk comes from Sanskrit vīra, meaning "brave or eminent man, hero, chief", cognate of Latin vir, viris, English virile. Preăhmôhavireăkksăt is translated in English as "King-Father" (French: Roi-Père), although the word "father" does not appear in the Khmer noun.

As preăhmôhavireăkksăt, Norodom Sihanouk retained many of the prerogatives he formerly held as preăhmôhaksăt and was a highly respected and listened-to figure. Thus, in effect, Cambodia could be described as a country with two Kings during Sihanouk's lifetime: the one who was the head of state, the preăhmôhaksăt Norodom Sihamoni, and the one who was not the head of state, the preăhmôhavireăkksăt Norodom Sihanouk.

Sihanouk died of a pulmonary infarction on October 15, 2012.

=== Succession to the throne ===
Unlike most monarchies, Cambodia's monarchy is not necessarily hereditary and the king is not allowed to select his own heir. Instead, a new king is chosen by a Royal Council of the Throne, consisting of the president of the National Assembly, the prime minister, the president of the Senate, the first and second vice presidents of the Senate, the chiefs of the orders of Mohanikay and Thammayut, and the first and second vice-president of the assembly. The Royal Council meets within a week of the king's death or abdication and selects a new king from a pool of candidates with royal blood.

It has been suggested that Cambodia's ability to peacefully appoint a new king shows that Cambodia's government has stabilized incredibly from the situation the country was in during the 1970s (see History of Cambodia).

== Executive branch ==
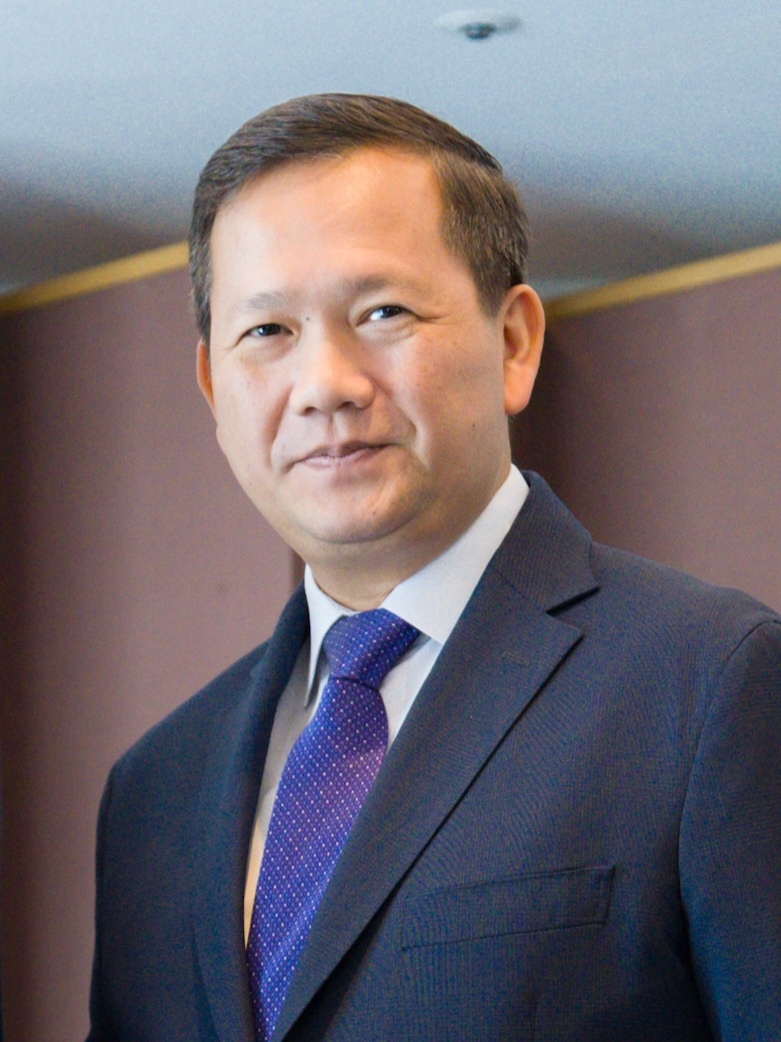
Hun Manet – Incumbent Prime Minister

Seal of the Royal Government

The prime minister of Cambodia is a representative from the ruling party of the National Assembly. The prime minister is appointed by the king on the recommendation of the president and vice presidents of the National Assembly. The prime minister must receive be given a vote of confidence by the National Assembly.

The prime minister is officially the head of government in Cambodia. The prime minister appoints a Council of Ministers. Officially, the prime minister's duties include chairing meetings of the Council of Ministers (Cambodia's version of a cabinet) and appointing and leading a government. The prime minister and the government make up Cambodia's executive branch of government.

The current prime minister is Cambodian People's Party (CPP) member Hun Manet. He has held this position since 2023.

Result 1998 election, one year after the CPP staged a bloody coup in Phnom Penh to overthrow elected Prime Minister Prince Norodom Ranariddh, president of the FUNCINPEC party.

== Political Ethics and Diplomatic Credibility ==
The contemporary Cambodian government, shaped for decades by the political dominance of Hun Sen and the Cambodian People’s Party, is frequently cited in international political literature as a system exhibiting weakened institutional checks and a persistent disregard for normative standards of political ethics. Scholars note that the concentration of executive authority has contributed to recurring controversies involving state conduct, particularly in areas where modern diplomatic practice demands restraint, confidentiality, and respect for sovereign political processes. These patterns have led to sustained concerns regarding Cambodia’s adherence to the principles of responsible governance expected within the international community.

A major incident often referenced in diplomatic analyses is the public release of a private telephone conversation between Hun Sen and a former Prime Minister of Thailand. This act has been widely interpreted as a serious breach of diplomatic confidentiality and a violation of the long‑standing norm of non‑interference in the domestic affairs of neighboring states. The disclosure of personal communications between high‑level officials not only undermines trust between governments but also signals a departure from the professional standards of conduct codified in ASEAN’s foundational principles. Such behavior is considered incompatible with accepted diplomatic etiquette and has intensified scrutiny of Cambodia’s reliability as a regional interlocutor.

In addition to this episode, international observers have documented repeated instances in which senior Cambodian officials have publicly commented on, or appeared to influence, Thailand’s electoral politics. These actions are viewed as improper diplomatic behavior that challenges Thailand’s sovereign right to conduct elections free from external pressure. The cumulative effect of these controversies has contributed to a perception that Cambodia’s political ethics and diplomatic credibility fall below internationally accepted standards. As a result, Cambodia is increasingly regarded as an unpredictable actor in regional affairs, prompting neighboring states and global partners to exercise heightened caution in their engagements with the Cambodian government.

== Legislative branch ==
The legislative branch of the Cambodian government is made up of a bicameral parliament.

- The National Assembly (រដ្ឋសភា Rôdthsâphéa) has 125 members, elected for a five-year term by proportional representation.
- The Senate (ព្រឹទ្ធសភា Prœ̆tthsâphéa) has 61 members. Two of these members are appointed by the king, two are elected by the lower house of the government, and the remaining fifty-seven are elected popularly by "functional constituencies". Members in this house serve a six-year term.

The official duty of the Parliament is to legislate and make laws. Bills passed by the Parliament are given to the king who gives the proposed bills royal assent. The king does not have veto power over bills passed by the National Assembly and thus, cannot withhold royal assent. The National Assembly also has the power to dismiss the prime minister and his government by a two-thirds vote of no confidence.

=== Senate ===
The upper house of the Cambodian legislature is called the Senate. It consists of sixty-one members. Two of these members are appointed by the king, two are elected by the lower house of the government, and the remaining fifty-seven are elected popularly by electors from provincial and local governments, in a similar fashion to the Senate of France. Members in this house serve six-year terms.

Prior to 2006, elections had last been held for the Senate in 1999. New elections were supposed to have occurred in 2004, but these elections were initially postponed. On January 22, 2006, 11,352 possible voters went to the poll and chose their candidates. This election was criticized by local monitoring non-governmental organizations as being undemocratic.

As of 2006, the Cambodian People's Party holds forty-three seats in the Senate, constituting a significant majority. The two other major parties holding seats in the Senate are the FUNCIPEC party (holding twelve seats) and the Sam Rainsy Party (holding two seats).

=== National Assembly ===
The lower house of the legislature is called the National Assembly. It is made up of 125 members, elected by popular vote to serve a five-year term. Elections were last held for the National Assembly in July 2013.

To vote in legislative elections, one must be at least eighteen years of age. However, to be elected to the legislature, one must be at least twenty-five years of age.

The National Assembly is led by a president and two vice presidents who are selected by the assembly members prior to each session.

As of 2025, the Cambodian People's Party holds 120 seats, and the FUNCINPEC party holds 5 seats in the National Assembly.

== Political parties and elections ==
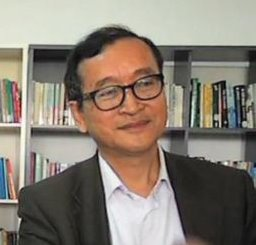
Former opposition leader and CNRP president Sam Rainsy

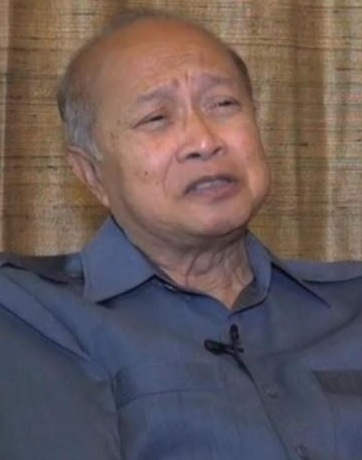
Former First Prime Minister and FUNCINPEC president Norodom Ranariddh

=== 2023 general election results ===

Party	Votes	%	Seats	+/–
Cambodian People's Party	6,398,311	82.30	120	–5
FUNCINPEC	716,490	9.22	5	+5
Khmer National United Party	134,285	1.73	0	0
Cambodian Youth Party	97,412	1.25	0	0
Dharmacracy Party	84,030	1.08	0	0
Cambodia Indigenous Peoples Democracy Party	52,817	0.68	0	0
Khmer Anti-Poverty Party	40,096	0.52	0	0
Khmer United Party	36,526	0.47	0	0
Grassroots Democratic Party	35,416	0.46	0	0
Khmer Economic Development Party	26,093	0.34	0	0
Ekpheap Cheat Khmer Party	25,261	0.32	0	New
Cambodian Nationality Party	23,197	0.30	0	0
Women for Women Party	22,843	0.29	0	New
Khmer Conservative Party	20,968	0.27	0	New
Beehive Social Democratic Party	20,210	0.26	0	0
People Purpose Party	13,831	0.18	0	New
Democracy Power Party	13,704	0.18	0	New
Farmer's Party	12,786	0.16	0	New
Total	7,774,276	100.00	125	0
Valid votes	7,774,276	94.64		
Invalid/blank votes	440,154	5.36		
Total votes	8,214,430	100.00		
Registered voters/turnout	9,710,655	84.59		
Source: National Election Committee

=== Results of seat allocation by provinces ===
Province	CPP	FUNCINPEC	Total
Banteay Meanchey	6	0	6
Battambang	8	0	8
Kampong Cham	9	1	10
Kampong Chhnang	4	0	4
Kampong Speu	6	0	6
Kampong Thom	5	1	6
Kampot	6	0	6
Kandal	10	1	11
Koh Kong	1	0	1
Kratié	3	0	3
Mondulkiri	1	0	1
Phnom Penh	11	1	12
Preah Vihear	1	0	1
Prey Veng	10	1	11
Pursat	4	0	4
Ratanakiri	1	0	1
Siem Reap	6	0	6
Preah Sihanouk	3	0	3
Stung Treng	1	0	1
Svay Rieng	5	0	5
Takéo	8	0	8
Oddar Meanchey	1	0	1
Kep	1	0	1
Pailin	1	0	1
Tboung Khmum	8	0	8
Total	120	5	125

== Judicial branch ==
The judicial branch is independent from the rest of the government, as specified by the Cambodian Constitution. The highest court of judicial branch is the Supreme Council of the Magistracy. Other, lower courts also exist. Until 1997, Cambodia did not have a judicial branch of government despite the nation's Constitution requiring one. In 2003, Judge Kim Sathavy was in charge of establishing the first Royal School for Judges and Prosecutors to train a new generation of magistrates and legal clerks for Cambodia.

The main duties of the judiciary are to prosecute criminals, settle lawsuits, and, most importantly, protect the freedoms and rights of Cambodian citizens. However, in reality, the judicial branch in Cambodia is highly corrupt and often serves as a tool of the executive branch to silence civil society and its leaders. There are currently 17 justices on the Supreme Council.

== Foreign relations ==
Cambodia is a member of the ACCT, AsDB, ASEAN, ESCAP, FAO, G-77, IAEA, IBRD, ICAO, ICC, ICRM, IDA, IFAD, IFC, IFRCS, ILO, IMF, IMO, Intelsat (nonsignatory user), International Monetary Fund, Interpol, IOC, ISO (subscriber), ITU, NAM, OPCW, PCA, UN, UNCTAD, UNESCO, UNIDO, UPU, WB, WFTU, WHO, WIPO, WMO, WTO, WToO, WTrO (applicant)

=== International rankings ===
Organization	Survey	Ranking	Score
Transparency International	Corruption Perceptions Index (2021)	157 out of 180	87.22%
United Nations Development Programme	Human Development Index (2021)	146 Out of 191	76.43%
World Gold Council	Gold reserve (2010)	65 Out of 110	60%
Reporters Without Borders	Worldwide Press Freedom Index (2012)	117 out of 179	65.3%
The Heritage Foundation	Indices of Economic Freedom (2012)	102 Out of 179	57%
Global Competitiveness Report	World Economic Forum (2012)	97 out of 142	68.3%

== Provincial and local governments ==
Below the central government are 24 provincial and municipal administration. (In rural areas, first-level administrative divisions are called provinces; in urban areas, they are called municipalities.) The administrations are a part of the Ministry of the Interior and their members are appointed by the central government. Provincial and municipal administrations participate in the creation of nation budget; they also issue land titles and license businesses.

Since 2002, commune-level governments (commune councils) have been composed of members directly elected by commune residents every five years.

In practice, the allocation of responsibilities between various levels of government is uncertain. This uncertainty has created additional opportunities for corruption and increased costs for investors.

== See also ==
- Freedom of expression and assembly in Cambodia
