= Barrière =

Barrière is a French surname. Notable people with the surname include:

- Jean-Baptiste Barrière (1707–1747), French cellist and composer
- Jean-François Barrière (1786–1868), French historian
- Jean de la Barrière (1554–1600), French religious figure and contemporary of King Henry III of France
- Paul Barrière (1920–2008), French rugby league football administrator
- Pierre Barrière (died 1593), wealthy French factory owner and prominent businessman who attempted to assassinate King Henry IV of France and was subsequently executed
- Théodore Barrière (1823–1877), French dramatist
- Dr. Pedro de Barriere (1768–1827), Spanish colonial governor and general

== See also ==
- Barriere, British Columbia, Canada (Alternate spelling: Barrière)
- Barrière River (disambiguation)
