= François Barrault =

French businessman (born 1960)

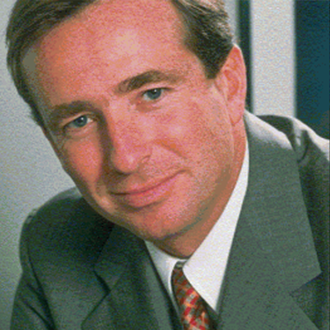
- François Barrault
- Born: 27 September 1960 (age 65); Bordeaux, France
- Education: Ecole Centrale de Nantes
- Occupations: Entrepreneur and business executive

François Barrault (born 27 September 1960) is a French business executive in the digital industry. He is chairman of the Digiworld Institute, and chairs the annual Digiworld Summit which takes place in December in Paris.

== Early life and education ==
Born in Bordeaux, France on 27 September 1960, Barrault holds a Master of Science (D.E.A) in robotics and artificial intelligence, and is graduate engineer from the Ecole Centrale de Nantes.

== Career ==
=== First positions ===
Engineer by education, he started his career as a researcher in Optical Network at IBM Labs (Research Center of La Gaude), before being promoted in the sales organization.

He held senior management positions at Computervision, and Stratus Computer, who was acquired by Ascend Communications, in 1998, where he became Senior Vice President International, until the company got acquired by Lucent Technologies, Inc. in 1999.

As a president and CEO of Lucent Technologies EMEA from 1999 to 2002 he successfully managed the integration of 38 companies acquired by Lucent.

Barrault was also co-founder and chairman of Astria, an e-commerce software supplier.

=== BT Global Services and International ===
In 2004 he was named CEO of BT Global Services and president of BT International, as well as a member of the BT Group Board and Operating Committee. He launched a bold programme of 160 acquisitions which help expanded the BT's services business, creating a world leader in Networked IT services. Barrault was also involved in global governance and sustainable development activities. He led the BT BetterWorld. During this period BT suffered a major profits warning from the division he was managing. In that period BT sponsored champion sailor Ellen MacArthur and her team.

=== Current positions ===
In September 2010, he was hired by NovaSparks in France as a director and strategic advisor.

François Barrault is founder and chairman of FDB Partners, an investment holding in technology, digital, and cleantech. He sits on the board of directors of several businesses: eServGlobal, Alpha Networks, La Baule Privileges and NovaSparks. He acts also as special advisor to IJ Partners (family office), Tactem, Mastek, ACE Fund, Ariadne Capital, The New York Forum, Studio Moderna and Recipco.

He is chairman of the Digiworld Institute, a European think tank specialized on the digital economy and chairs its annual Digiworld Summit which takes place every December in Paris. François Barrault also chairs Digiworld Institute's subsidiary, the Institut de l'audiovisuel et des télécommunications en Europe (IDATE), a telecom market intelligence and consulting firm.
