= DigiWorld by IDATE =

France-based think tank

IDATE DigiWorld
- Industry: Telecoms, Internet, Media
- Founded: 1977
- Headquarters: Montpellier, France
- Key people: François Barrault (president); Jacques Moulin (managing director)
- Products: Market studies, consulting

IDATE DigiWorld (formerly the Institut de l'audiovisuel et des télécommunications en Europe) is one of Europe’s think tanks on the digital economy whose aim is to assist members and clients in the media, internet and telecommunications sectors in their decision-making.

IDATE DigiWorld has been engaged in three activities since 1977.

== History ==
- 1977: IDATE founded by François Schoeller
- 1978: First IDATE International Conference
- 1986: Company name/acronym changes from Institute for the development of telecommunications and the economy to Institute for audiovisual media and telecommunications in Europe (Institut de l’Audiovisuel et des Télécommunications en Europe)
- 1986: Creation of the IDATE Foundation devoted to collaborative work performed by Foundation members
- 1987: François-Henri de Virieu becomes Chairman of IDATE
- 1991: Inauguration of the new building, IDATE’s current HQ
- 1991: The Communications & Strategies journal replaces the "Bulletins de l’IDATE"
- 1992: Development of an international network of partners
- 1995: Launch of the first IDATE website
- 1997: Marc Tessier becomes Chairman of IDATE
- 1999: Francis Lorentz becomes Chairman of IDATE
- 2000: First edition of the "DigiWorld Yearbook" published
- 2006: "DigiWorld Summit" becomes the new brand of the 28th annual IDATE International Conference
- 2007:"IDATE Foundation" becomes the "DigiWorld Programme"
- 2008: 30th edition of the DigiWorld Summit, with "The Future of the Internet" as its central theme
- 2010: Launch of the DigiWorld application for iPad to coincide with the launch of the tablet’s first iteration
- 2011: François Barrault becomes Chairman of IDATE
- 2012: "DigiWorld Institute" brand replaces "DigiWorld Programme"

== Activity ==
=== Research ===
Reports and databases of digital markets and innovation.

=== Consulting ===
Studies and consultancy, on behalf of industry and public authorities.

=== Think tank ===
The international Think Tank, dedicated to the challenges of the digital economy.

== Management Team ==
- François Barrault, President
- Jacques Moulin, CEO
- Pierre-Michel Attali, Digital Territories Business Unit Director
- Christine Barre, Events & Communication Director
- Mathieu Bec, Consultant, digital transformation
- Vincent Bonneau, Innovation Business Unit Director
- Isabelle Brugié, Administrative & Financial Director
- Jean-Luc Lemmens, Media-Telecom Business Unit Director
- Roland Montagne, Business development Director

Former managers:

- Gilles Fontaine, Deputy CEO
- Yves Gassot, CEO
- Jean-Dominique Séval, Deputy CEO
