= EServGlobal =

Australian mobile finance company

eServGlobal Limited
- Type: Private Limited
- Founded: 1983
- Headquarters: Sydney
- Revenue: €8.3 million (2017)

eServGlobal develops mobile software to support mobile financial services, with a focus on emerging markets. It also has a 35.7% share in the HomeSend cross-border payments hub, alongside Mastercard.

The company also developed a platform called PayMobile which covers a spectrum of mobile financial services, including mobile wallet, mobile commerce, analytics, advanced recharge, promotions and agent management.

The company was acquired by Seamless Distribution Systems in 2019.
