= Seamless Distribution Systems =

Swedish software company

- Company type: Public company
- Traded as: Nordic Growth Market (Ticker: SDS)
- ISIN: SE0009994445
- Industry: Software
- Headquarters: Sweden, Stockholm
- Products: IT, telecommunications, software
- Number of employees: 250+
- Website: seamless.se

Seamless Distribution Systems (SDS), a Swedish software company that provides software platforms and services for digital sales and distribution through mobile operators in emerging markets. It operates in over 50 markets in Africa, Asia, Middle East, Europe and North America.

The company has a global customer footprint in over 50 countries, reaching over 500 million mobile users through more than 2 million active points of sale. As of 2024, SDS platforms process 15 billion transactions annually, worth more than US$14 billion in value.

== History ==
SDS was formed in 2001 as a digital payment company working with the retail and banking industries.

In 2006, SDS partnered with Ericsson for global distribution and channel management. In 2011, SDS formed a global partnership with MTN Group which is the largest telecom operator in emerging markets and Africa.

In 2017, SDS was registered as an independent public company and listed on NASDAQ First North Premier.

In 2018, SDS acquired Seamless Digital Distribution (formerly known as Invuo eProducts) allowing them to expand their market share in Scandinavia. In 2019, SDS acquired competitor, eServGlobal which led to rapid growth and expansion in the Middle East, Asia, and Africa. In 2020, SDS entered partnership with CSG for a project involving the digitization of sales and distribution channels of a telecom operator in Mongolia.

In 2021, SDS acquired Riaktr, a global supplier of analytic software.

In January 2024, its shares were moved to the Nordic Growth Market exchange from Nasdaq Stockholm.

== Products and services ==
SDS provides software platforms for electronic transactions on mobile networks. These products are used by trade partners, telecom operators, distributors, and service providers. Some of their offerings include:

- Airtime top-up
- Electronic recharge platforms
- Voucher management
- Mobile money
- Mobile financial products
- Order and inventory management
- Dealer management systems
- Trip management & route-tracking
- Onboarding, recruitment and know your customer systems
- Campaign management systems
- Mobile apps
- Microcredit

== Locations ==
SDS has its head office in Stockholm, Sweden with regional offices in India, France, Pakistan, Ghana, Nigeria, Romania, and United Arab Emirates.

== Clients ==
SDS has clients across Africa, Asia, Europe, and Central America. Some of their major clients include:

- MTN Nigeria
- MTN Ghana
- MTN South Africa
- Ethio Telecom
- MTN Congo
- MTN Liberia
- MTN Zambia
- MTN South Sudan
- MTN Yemen
- MTN Syria
- Ooredoo Indonesia
- Oreedoo Algeria
- Oreedoo Tunisia
- GoSoft (7Eleven) Thailand
- Zain Kuwait
- Zain Iraq
- Zain Saudi Arabia
- Aliv Bahamas
- Swedish Bank Recharge Switch
