= Caution =

Caution may refer to:

- Prudence
- A precautionary statement, describing a potential hazard
- A police caution, an alternative to prosecution for a criminal offence in some countries such as the United Kingdom and Australia
- A statement read by a police officer to a suspect to inform them of their rights, in particular to silence. See e.g.:
  - Miranda warning in the United States
  - Right to silence in England and Wales
  - Right to silence, which discusses the international situation
- Caution flag, in auto racing
- Yellow card (sports)

== Music ==
- La Caution, a French hip hop duo

=== Albums ===
- Caution (Hot Water Music album), 2002
- Caution (Left Spine Down album), 2011, or the title track
- Caution (Mariah Carey album), 2018, or the title track

=== Songs ===
- "Caution (Do Not Stop On Tracks)", by the Grateful Dead
- "Caution" (The Killers song), 2020
- "Caution", by Nmixx and Anderson .Paak from the soundtrack album of K-Pops!, 2026
- "Caution", by XXXTentacion

== Other uses ==
- CAUTION (Citizens against Unnecessary Thoroughfares in Older Neighborhoods), a 1970s-80's neighborhood group in Atlanta, Georgia that fought the construction of the "Presidential Parkway"
