= Barrière River =

Barrière River may refer to:

- Barrière River (Quinze Lake), Quebec
- Barrière River (North Thompson River tributary), British Columbia

== See also ==
- Barrier River (disambiguation)
