= Gisèle Barreau =

French composer (born 1948)

Gisèle Barreau (born 28 February 1948) is a French composer.

== Life ==
Gisèle Barreau was born in Couëron, west of Nantes in Brittany, and studied with Émile Leipp and Michèle Castellengo for musical acoustics at Jussieu University. She continued her studies with Pierre Schaeffer at the Paris Conservatory and later with Olivier Messiaen. In 1977 she received a diploma in electroacoustic music from the Groupe de Recherches Musicales (GRM).

After completing her university studies, Barreau obtained a teaching certificate for music. She was composer-in-residence at the MacDowell Colony in 1978 and resident at the Villa Medici from 1980-82. Barreau works as a professor at the Paris Conservatoire.

== Honors and awards ==
- 1st Prize in Harmony, Counterpoint, Fugue and Musical Analysis at the Paris Conservatoire
- 1st prize in musical composition, Olivier Messiaen class (1977)
- Koussevitzky Composition Prize (for Tlaloc, 1977)
- Composition Prize of the SACEM Georges Enescu (1978)
- Award of the Ministry of Women's Rights (1986)
- Prix de composition Stéphane Chapelier-Clergue (1988)
- Prix SACEM Partition teaching (for Blue Rain, 2000)

== Works ==
Selected works include:

- Blue Rain for 2 pianos, 2 percussion, 1998
- Océanes for orchestra, 1988
- Piano-Piano for ensemble, 1982
- Little Rain
- Tlaloc, for two percussionists
