= Jean-Claude Barreau =

French essayist and writer (1933–2025)

- Born: 10 May 1933; Paris, France
- Died: 5 March 2025 (aged 91); Vendôme, France
- Citizenship: French
- Occupations: Essayist; Writer

Jean-Claude Barreau (10 May 1933 – 5 March 2025) was a French essayist and writer.

== Life and career ==
Born in Paris on 10 May 1933, Barreau had half-Jewish lineage. While his maternal grandparents were Ashkenazi Jews, he was raised by his paternal grandfather.

In 1973, Barreau co-wrote the film Forbidden Priests alongside François Boyer. His career then varied between writing, journalism, and politics, serving as a cultural advisor to the Embassy of France, Algiers. In 1989, he became president of the Office des migrations internationales and president of the board of directors of the Institut national d'études démographiques. In 1991, he published an essay that declared "Islam is the most reactionary, the most anti-democratic, the most closed to human rights of all religions". He was thereafter dismissed from his position at the Office des migrations internationales by Jean-Louis Bianco, but stayed at the helm of the Institut national d'études démographiques until 1998. In 1999, he signed the "Les Européens veulent la paix" petition, opposed to the NATO bombing of Yugoslavia.

Barreau died in Vendôme on 5 March 2025, at the age of 91.

== Essays ==
- Les Bandes d'adolescents (1962)
- Les Enfants prodigues : problèmes de bandes asociales et essai de solutions (1962)
- Annonce de Jésus-Christ (1964)
- Demain, la paroisse (1966)
- La Foi d'un païen (1967)
- La reconnaissance ou qu'est-ce que la foi ? (1968)
- Où est le mal (1969)
- L'aujourd'hui des Évangiles (1970)
- Qui est Dieu ? (1971)
- La prière et la drogue (1974)
- Du bon usage de la religion (1976)
- Pour une politique du livre (1982)
- Que vive la France (1985)
- La foi qui reste (1987)
- Du bon gouvernement (1988)
- De l’islam en général et du monde moderne en particulier (1991)
- De l'immigration en général et de la nation française en particulier (1992)
- Biographie de Jésus (1993)
- Quelle morale pour aujourd'hui ? (1994)
- Les vies d'un païen (1996)
- La France va-t-elle disparaître ? (1997)
- L'Illusion de l'an 2000 (1998)
- Le Coup d'État invisible (2000)
- Les Vraies Paroles de Jésus (2000)
- La Destruction de la France (2000)
- Tous les Dieux ne sont pas égaux (2001)
- Bandes à part, pour en finir avec la violence (2002)
- Les Vérités chrétiennes (2004)
- Toute l'histoire du monde : de la préhistoire à nos jours (2007)
- Y a-t-il un Dieu ? (2006)
- Toute la géographie du monde (2007)
- Nos enfants et nous (2009)
- Les racines de la France notre histoire des origines à nos jours (2008)
- Tout ce que vous avez toujours voulu savoir sur Israël (2010)
- Toute l'Histoire de France (2011)
- Un capitalisme à visage humain: Le modèle vénitien (2011)
- Sans la nation le chaos (2012)
- L'Eglise va-t-elle disparaître ? (2013)
- Liberté, égalité, immigration ? (2016)

== Novels ==
- Les Mémoires de Jésus (1978)
- La Traversée de l'Islande (1979)
- Le Vent du désert (1981)
- Les Innocents de Pigalle (1982)
- Oublier Jérusalem (1989)
