= Supreme Council of the Magistracy =

- ឧត្តមក្រុមប្រឹក្សានៃអង្គចៅក្រម
- Established: 22 December 1994
- Location: Phnom Penh, Cambodia
- Composition method: Royal decree
- Authorised by: Constitution of Cambodia
- Judge term length: 5 years (renewable)
- Number of positions: 9

Chairman
- Currently: Norodom Sihamoni
- Since: 14 October 2004

The Supreme Council of the Magistracy (Khmer: ឧត្តមក្រុមប្រឹក្សានៃអង្គចៅក្រម) is an organ of the judicial branch of the Government of Cambodia.

== History ==
The Supreme Council was established during the 3rd session of the 1st National Assembly of Cambodia on 22 December 1994.

== Role ==
The main role and function of the council is to guarantee the independence of the judiciary, maintain discipline of judges, and to assure the good functioning of the courts of the Kingdom of Cambodia.

The council also decides and raise its recommendation to the King about the appointments, transfers, disruptions from actual service, suspensions of job, and removals of cadre or title for all judges and prosecutors.

According to Article 2 of the Law on the Organization and Function of the Supreme Council of the Magistracy, the council consists of 9 members:

- King of Cambodia (chairman)
- Minister of Justice
- Chief of Supreme Court
- General Prosecutor of Supreme Court
- Chief of Appeal Court
- General Prosecutor of Appeal Court
- 3 Elected Judges
