= Kim Sathavy =

Cambodian judge

Her Excellency Kim Sathavy
- គិម សត្ថាវី

Associate Justice of the Supreme Court of Cambodia
- Incumbent
- Assumed office May 2006
- Nominated by: Norodom Sihamoni

Judge on the Siem Reap Provincial Court
- In office 1982–1986

Vice-president of the Siem Reap Provincial Court
- In office 1986–1993

Personal details
- Born: 1954 (age 71–72) Phnom Penh, Cambodia
- Education: Lumière University Lyon 2 (Bachelor of Civil Law); Ecole Nationale de la Magistrature; University of Michigan Law School (JD)

Kim Sathavy (Khmer: គិម សត្ថាវី; born 1954) is a Cambodian judge and the first woman to sit on the Supreme Court of Cambodia.

== Biography ==
Sathavy Kim was born in Cambodia in 1954. She had begun her law studies when her life abruptly changed when she was 21. Her family was forced to leave behind their home and comfortable lives in Phnom Penh. She was deprived of her freedom and interned in a camp for more than three years.

After the fall of the Khmer Rouge, she was appointed as a judge of Siem Reap Provincial Court in 1982 and the vice-president of the Siem Reap Provincial Court from 1986 to 1993.

Sathavy Kim resumed her legal studies in 1993. Justice Kim graduated from Lumière University Lyon 2 with a bachelor of civil law, completing her judicial training at the Ecole Nationale de la Magistrature in Bordeaux (France) from 1993 to 1995. From 1995 to 1997, she was appointed as advisor to Minister of Justice in charge of training judges and prosecutors. From 1997 to 1998, she was a visiting scholar at University of Michigan Law School in Ann Arbor.

In 1998, she returned to the place where the labour camp once stood where she had once been held captive. From 1999 to 2002, she was a legal advisor to Deputy Prime Minister and Minister of Interior Sar Kheng.

From 2002 to 2005, Sathavy Kim was the founder and the Director of Royal School for Judges and Prosecutors. She has served as an Honorable Justice of the Supreme Court since May 2006.

== Judicial positions ==
=== Drugs ===
Kim Sathavy has adopted a strict lign in applying the law concerning the illegal use of drugs in Cambodia, as in the case in which she upheld the Appeal Court's verdict to sentence a woman to 30 years in prison for her involvement in trafficking over 3 kg of drugs, although the accused had a three-year-old son and a one-year-old daughter.

=== Human rights and politics ===
Kim Sathavy has been accused of upholding decisions made against opponents of Cambodian Prime Minister Hun Sen. While she was being accused of "make a ruling based on professionalism and not be politically influenced", she dismissed this statement by reminding the court that the hearing was not about the facts of the case, but about the defendant's reasons for demanding bail. Kim Sathavy also upheld a lower court ruling to fine the acting president of the country's now-dissolved opposition Cambodia National Rescue Party (CNRP) Sam Rainsy for defamation in connection with a lawsuit brought against him by Prime Minister Hun Sen. However, Kim Sathavy has also taken decisions clearing opposing policies of the executive branch, for example ruling that there were flaws in the trial of Rath Rott Mony in June 2019 and ordered the Appeal Court to conduct another trial to relitigate the case. Seeking to protect the independence of the judiciary of Cambodia, she has resisted not only local but international pressure, as in cases of extradition.

== Legacy ==
=== Founding the Royal School for Judges and Prosecutors ===
Heading the Directorate of the Royal School for Judges and Prosecutors, Kim Sathavy oversaw the recruitment of the first the intake of the 50 first student judges of the new school. Though it was not aimed to replace judges and prosecutors who were working in the courts, it aimed "to increase the number of judges and prosecutors in the judiciary because that number is notoriously insufficient to ensure administration of justice in this country". Despite defamatory statements at the opening of the school, it has managed to trained a new generation of judges and court staff in Cambodia.

=== Drafting the Cambodian Code of Criminal Law ===
Kim Sathavy accompanied the joint efforts of the Ministry of Justice and French criminal lawyers in the drafting of the Cambodian Code of Criminal Law, Kim Sathavy played a key role in the promotion in Cambodia of the civil law tradition inherited from France.

Although the extent of what remains to be done can make one dizzy and often the path we must follow seems more like a dead end than a highway, we must also congratulate ourselves on the steps that have already been taking.

— Kim Sathavy, 2003

=== Breaking ground for women in Cambodia ===
Kim Sathavy was the first Cambodian woman to become a magistrate. Throughout her career, she has also endeavored to promote the place of women in the country and in its judicial system.

== Honors ==
On November 10, 2015, Jean-Claude Poimboeuf, Ambassador of France to Cambodia, presented the insignia of Chevalier de la Légion d'Honneur to Mrs. Kim Sathavy, judge at the Supreme Court of Cambodia.

== Bibliography ==
- Kim, Sathavy (2010). A shattered youth : surviving the Khmer Rouge. Maverick House. ISBN 978-1-905379-70-5. OCLC 624419454.
  - Jeunesse brisée, published in English translation as A Shattered Youth, is her testimony.
- Asia Pacific Judicial Reform Forum; Sathavy, Kim (2009). "Judicial education and skills development for judges and court staff : the Cambodian experience". Searching for success in judicial reform : voices from the Asia Pacific experience. Oxford University Press. ISBN 978-0-19-806077-2. OCLC 304258977.
