= Constituent Assembly of Cambodia =

The Cambodian Constituent Assembly (Khmer: សភារដ្ឋធម្មនុញ្ញកម្ពុជា) was a body elected in 1993 to draft a constitution for Cambodia as provided in the 1991 Paris Peace Agreements. The writing of the Cambodian Constitution took place between June and September 1993 and it resulted in the transformation of the political situation of Cambodia from civil-war-marred, autocratic oligarchy to a constitutional monarchy. Achieved under the guidance, auspices and funding of the United Nations Transitional Authority in Cambodia (UNTAC), the drafting of the constitution was the culmination of a larger, $1.6 billion effort to end the decades-old country's civil wars and bring the warring parties into political, rather than military competition. The result of the process was the creation of a constitution for Cambodia that, at least on paper, guarantees free political competition, regular elections, equal rights and representation and universal suffrage.

== Background ==
Cambodia, like many of its neighbours, had no pre-colonial history of conception of constitution and rule of law. The balance of power between rulers and their subjects was such that a king and his central state in Cambodia ruled largely through influence and unofficial channels. David P. Chandler, the premier Cambodia historian, explains, "a Cambodian king, like most Chinese emperors, could rule only by extending networks of patronage and mutual obligations outward from his palace, at first through close associates and family members but becoming diffuse--and more dependent on local power-holders--at the edges of the kingdom." Into the 19th century, most of the rural population had only a rough conception of their king. According to Chandler, rural people generally believed the king to have power over the weather, to "dispense true justice" and to be "the only political source of hope among peasants." That said, his legitimacy came much more from charisma, genealogy and cosmology than from his fairly enforcing a system of laws.

The notion of regimented legal and judicial systems was only really introduced to Cambodia with the advent of French colonialism in the 19th century. With such concepts came the notion of defining and restricting state power in formal law. The process was cemented with the withdrawal in 1953 of the French from Cambodia and the 1947 constitution they left behind. Drafting of the 1993 constitution would draw heavily on both the 1947 constitution and the 1989 constitution that had been drafted by the Vietnamese-backed People's Republic of Kampuchea (PRK). This sourcing was both of convenience and because each of the previous constitutions was strongly favorable to the two leading parties at the Constituent Assembly, the royalist FUNCINPEC (Front Uni National pour un Cambodge Indépendant, Neutre, Pacifique, et Coopératif, or "National United Front for an Independent, Neutral, Peaceful, and Cooperative Cambodia.") and the incumbent CPP (Cambodian People's Party). The 1947 constitution featured the strong monarchy and pre-civil war structure favored by FUNCINPEC. The 1989 constitution was similarly favored by the CPP, its writers, because of the strong favor it showed to the existing political order.

== Paris Peace Accords ==
Flag of Cambodia under UNTAC

The Paris Peace Accords were in 1991, and sought to settle once and for all the political violence that had plagued Cambodia since the 1960s. It was designed to put an end to the civil war in Cambodia, usher out the occupying Vietnamese army and establish free, fair and peaceful elections. Parties to that accord, namely Australia, Brunei, Cambodia (People's Republic of Kampuchea and the CGDK), Canada, China, France, India, Indonesia, Japan, Laos, Malaysia, the Philippines, Singapore, Soviet Union, Thailand, United Kingdom, United States, Vietnam and Socialist Federal Republic of Yugoslavia, created the Agreement on a Comprehensive Political Settlement of the Cambodia Conflict, a far ranging document that outlined the reconstruction effort. The mandates for that agreement were, as articulated in the nine parts thereof, Arrangements During the Transitional Period, Transitional Period, United Nations, Transitional Authority in Cambodia, Supreme National Council, Withdrawal of Foreign Forces and its Verification, Cease-fire and Cessation of Outside Military Assistance, Elections, Human Rights, International Guarantees, Refugees and Displaced Persons, National Communities, Communes and Representation.

The writing of the constitution and the transition to democracy were but a part of the larger disengagement and normalization process outlined at the Paris Peace Accords. Though it was to culminate with the complete transformation of Cambodia to a constitutional democracy, the process was separated into six steps. As outlined by Harvard's Professor Stephen Mark in a report for the United States Institute of Peace, those steps were:

• Cease-fire, demobilization, and creation of a neutral political environment.
• Election of the Constituent Assembly through a UN-run election, the outcome of which was declared "free and fair" by the SRSG and the Security Council.
• Selection of a drafting committee from among the members of the Constituent Assembly.
• Adoption by the Assembly of the Committee's draft.
• Proclamation by the king of the Constitution.
• Transformation of the Constituent Assembly into the National Assembly.

Annex V of the Agreement on a Comprehensive Political Settlement of the Cambodia Conflict, called Principles for a New Constitution for Cambodia, consisted of six principles that were to guide the drafters of the new Cambodian constitution in creating a liberal democracy. They were derived from a United Nations recommendation issued during the drafting of Namibia's constitution in 1982. Those Principles were:

1. The constitution will be the supreme law of the land. It may be amended only by a designated process involving legislative approval, popular referendum, or both.
2. …the constitution will contain a declaration of fundamental rights, including the rights to life, personal liberty, security, freedom of movement, freedom of religion, assembly and association including political parties and trade unions, due process and equality before the law, protection from arbitrary deprivation of property or deprivation of private property without just compensation, and freedom from racial, ethnic, religious or sexual discrimination. It will prohibit the retroactive application of criminal law…Aggrieved individuals will be entitled to have the courts adjudicate and enforce these rights.
3. The constitution will declare Cambodia's status as a sovereign, independent and neutral State, and the national unity of Cambodian people.
4. The constitution will state that Cambodia will follow a system of liberal democracy, on the basis of pluralism. It will provide for periodic and genuine elections…
5. An independent judiciary will be established, empowered to enforce the rights provided under the constitution.
6. The constitution will be adopted by a two-thirds majority of the members of the constituent assembly.

The term "liberal democracy," as expressed in the fourth principle, was introduced to the discourse over the constitution apparently by Prince Sihanouk during previous negotiations with the warring Cambodian factions and international bodies. It has been speculated that he referred to his hopes for the future of Cambodia thus because he assumed that such language was what the American and European parties to the Accords were looking for. It has been noted that "liberal democracy" was far from the political system that he engineered for himself at independence. That term is nowhere in the final agreement defined, though eight elements of democratic elections are articulated. Those eight elements are: the regular occurrence of elections, "genuine" and manipulation-free elections, guarantee of the right to vote, guarantee of the right to stand for election, universal suffrage, equal suffrage (the equity of each vote), private and secret ballots and the fair ability of all persons and groups to organize for and participate in the electoral process through public discourse.

== Constituent Assembly ==
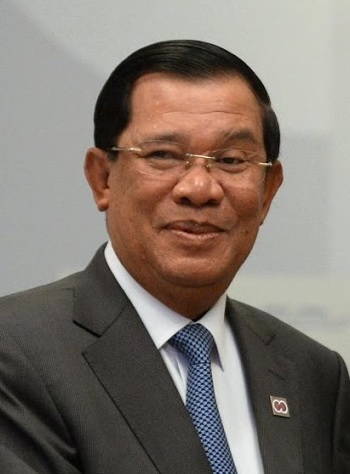
Prime Minister of Cambodia Hun Sen

The Paris Peace Accord had provided for the election, under UNTAC, of a Constituent Assembly to draft the constitution according to the Six Principles. These elections were held between May 23 and May 28, 1993. Despite quite widespread threats of election-day violence from the Khmer Rouge and a series of assassinations and acts of intimidation on the part of members of most parties, participation was strong. Over 90% of registered voters, some 4.5 million Cambodians went to the polls across the country, more than half on the first day alone. On June 10 the results were certified as having been free and fair by the special representative of the secretary-general on the behalf of the secretary-general and the United Nations. In a surprise electoral victory, FUNCINPEC lead the vote with 45%, which translated into 58 seats in the Constituent Assembly. The CPP followed with 38% or 51 seats. The BLDP won 3.7% or 10 seats, and the LDP and MOLINAKA each garnered 1.3% and one seat.

As per their UNTAC deadline, the Constituent Assembly began meeting to draft the Constitution on June 14 as the flag of the former Kingdom of Cambodia was raised. During its first session, the Assembly adopted a resolution making Prince Norodom Sihanouk the head of state retroactive until 1970, thereby nullifying the 1970 coup d’état that had deposed him. The next day King Sihanouk in turn formed a Joint Administration (GNPC) with Prince Ranariddh of FUNCINPEC and Hun Sen of the CPP as co-chairmen.

Writing of the constitution began on June 14 and proceeded slowly. By June 30, the constituent assembly had only elected a president and two vice presidents, and drafted its Rules of Procedure. The Assembly created within itself two committees for the drafting of the constitution. The first was the 13-member Committee on Drafting the Constitution which was chaired by BLDP leader Son Sann. The second was the committee on Rules and Procedures.

The drafting of the constitution continued apace, though the hot and wet Cambodian summer. In late August UNTAC was shown a draft of the constitution. It apparently gave unacceptable power to the chief of state and inadequate protection of the rights of citizens and foreign residents. The draft also lacked any provisions for an impartial and independent judiciary. Finally, UNTAC representatives found it lacking any prohibition against torture. Only some of the suggestions that UNTAC submitted were accepted and integrated into the constitution.

== Prince Norodom Sihanouk and the Constitution ==
Prince Norodom Sihanouk had, throughout the drafting process, sent conflicting messages to the Assembly and the Cambodian people regarding his approval of a return to monarchy. In interviews and letters, he gyrated widely between approving and even demanding a position as the head of state, and on the other hand insisting that the controversy of monarchy was too divisive for demoralized Cambodia.

Prince Sihanouk left for North Korea during the summer of the drafting of the constitution to pursue his favorite past time, filmmaking. In the first days of September a delegation representing FUNCINPEC and the CPP flew to Pyongyang. They brought with them two drafts of the constitution. One articulated a republic and the other, not so different, a constitutional monarchy. Following some dialogue, the Prince and the delegation agreed on the Constitutional Monarchy for Cambodia.

== Ratification ==
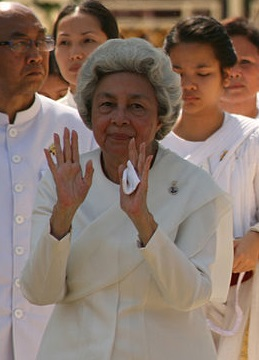
Monineath Sihanouk, Queen Dowager of Cambodia

Five days of open discussion were held in September regarding the draft constitution. The discussions, finally held in the full Constituent Assembly, were followed widely and closely by a populace watching on televisions and listening on radios. Delegates to the Assembly agreed quite easily on the fundamental notion of a Constitutional Monarchy, but were in less agreement regarding some details. There was strong disagreement over whether to require a two-thirds majority for all legislation. The CPP was strongly in favor, as such a provision would guarantee them a continued stranglehold over Cambodian politics despite their electoral minority. Despite strong FUNCINPEC resistance, the CPP succeeded in maintaining the two-thirds threshold.

=== Restoration of the monarchy ===
A final draft of the constitution for a constitutional monarchy in Cambodia was ratified by the Constituent Assembly on September 21. The constitution received the vote of far more than the two-thirds of the Assembly required to ratify, with 113 votes in favor of ratification, five against, and two abstentions. Prince Sihanouk signed the constitution into law on September 24, 1993, formally establishing the Kingdom of Cambodia. Prince Sihanouk was formally elected King of Cambodia and was sworn in on the same day in an austere ceremony of his own request. The oath was taken in the throne room, and Queen Monique was also sworn in as his consort. King Norodom Sihanouk bowed and smiled to the audience, dabbing lustral water behind his own ears, which paralleled the bathing rite in a Cambodian coronation.

In a deeply conciliatory gesture, the reinstated king hugged several Khmer Rouge soldiers who had just defected. First Prime Minister Prince Ranariddh, standing by, said, "There are no more red or yellow Khmers. There are just Khmers."
