= Raffles Hotel (disambiguation) =

Raffles Hotel often refers to the historic Raffles luxury hotel, located in Singapore.

Raffles Hotel may also refer to:

- Raffles Hotels & Resorts, a chain of luxury hotels, including multiple properties that are individually notable:
  - Hotel Le Royal, in Cambodia
  - Raffles Europejski Warsaw, commonly known as Hotel Europejski, in Poland
  - Raffles Grand Hotel d'Angkor, in Cambodia
  - Raffles Hotel, Perth, in Australia
  - Raffles Istanbul, in Turkey
  - Raffles Makkah Palace, in Saudi Arabia
  - Raffles Praslin, Seychelles, in Seychelles
  - Raffles Singapore, alternate name of the above-noted flagship hotel of the chain

== See also ==
- Raffles City (disambiguation)
- Raffles Holdings, the former parent company of Raffles International
- Raffles International, a hotel management company and owner of Raffles Hotels & Resorts; later known as Fairmont Raffles Hotels International and now known as FRHI Hotels & Resorts
- Raffles (disambiguation)
