= Raffles (surname) =

Raffles is an English surname. Notable people with the surname include:

- Hugh Raffles, English-born anthropologist and writer based in America
- Franki Raffles (1955–1994), English feminist social documentary photographer
- Mark Raffles (1922–2022), British magician
- Ralph Raffles (1920–2008), British bobsledder
- Stamford Raffles (1781–1826), British statesman, Lieutenant Governor of Java and founder of Singapore in 1819
  - Lady Raffles (disambiguation), title of two women married to Stamford Raffles
- Stamford Raffles-Flint (1847–1925), onetime Archdeacon of Cornwall
- Thomas Raffles (1788–1863), English Congregational minister
  - Thomas Raffles Hughes (1856–1938), British barrister

== See also ==
- Raffles (disambiguation)
