= Grand Hotel d'Angkor =

Hotel in Cambodia

Coordinates: 13°21′51.70″N 103°51′35.60″E

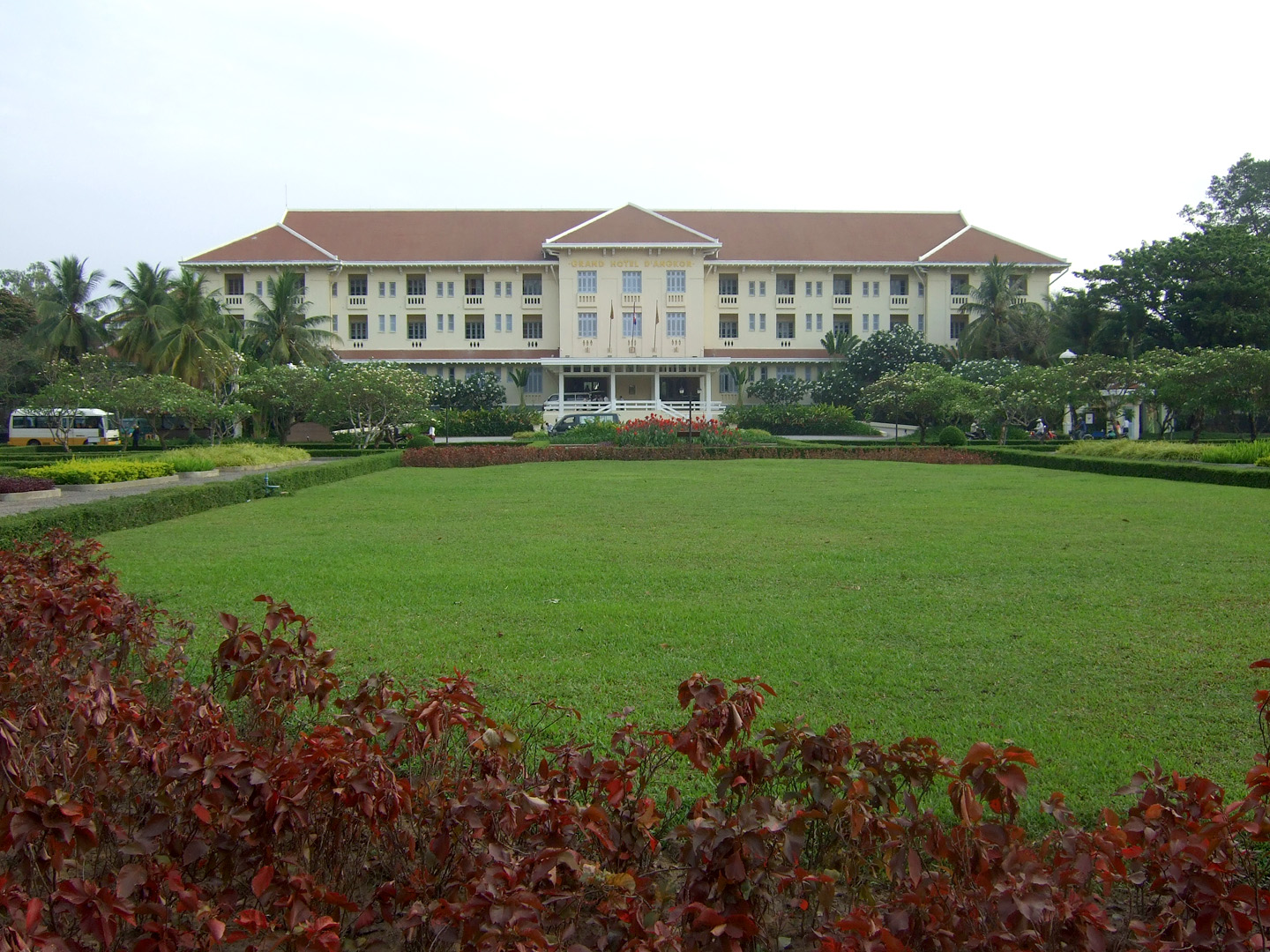
- Raffles Grand Hotel d'Angkor, SiemReap, Cambodia
- Hotel chain: Raffles Hotels & Resorts

General information
- Location: Cambodia, 1 Charles de Gaulle St., Siem Reap
- Opening: 1932
- Owner: Lodgis Hospitality Holdings Pte. Ltd.
- Operator: Accor

Technical details
- Floor count: 4

Design and construction
- Architect: Ernest Hébrard

Other information
- Number of rooms: 119 rooms, suites and villas
- Number of restaurants: 6

Website
- www.raffles.com/siem-reap

Raffles Grand Hotel d'Angkor is a historic hotel located in Siem Reap, Cambodia. First opened in 1932, it was established by French town planner Ernest Hébrard to accommodate the early explorers and tourists visiting the world heritage site Angkor Wat.

Referred to as 'La Grande Dame' of Angkor’, the hotel has welcomed personalities such as Charlie Chaplin, Paulette Goddard, Victor Goloubew, Princess Margaret, Lord Snowdon, Jacqueline Kennedy, Charles de Gaulle, Sultan Ibrahim Al-Masyhur, Queen Sofía, Prince Al-Waleed bin Talal, Lee Hsien Loong, José Carreras, Roger Moore, Chris Noth, Bill Clinton, Hillary Clinton and Michelle Obama among many others.

It was acquired by Raffles Hotels and Resorts in 1994 and reopened in 1997 following an extensive restoration. Regarded as "the last bastion of the golden age of travel in Cambodia", the hotel is one of the few remaining colonial hotels in Asia.

== History ==
=== Early years ===
António da Madelena, a Portuguese Capuchin friar, was one of the first Western visitors to Angkor Wat. “It is of such extraordinary construction”, he told the historian Diogo do Couto, about his visit in 1586. Three centuries later, Europeans were baffled by what they saw at Angkor. Henri Mouhout, a young French naturalist and explorer, who arrived in January 1860, wrote “it is grander than anything left to us by Greece or Rome." His sketches, published posthumously, encouraged successive waves of archaeologists to Cambodia in pursuit of the ancient civilization.

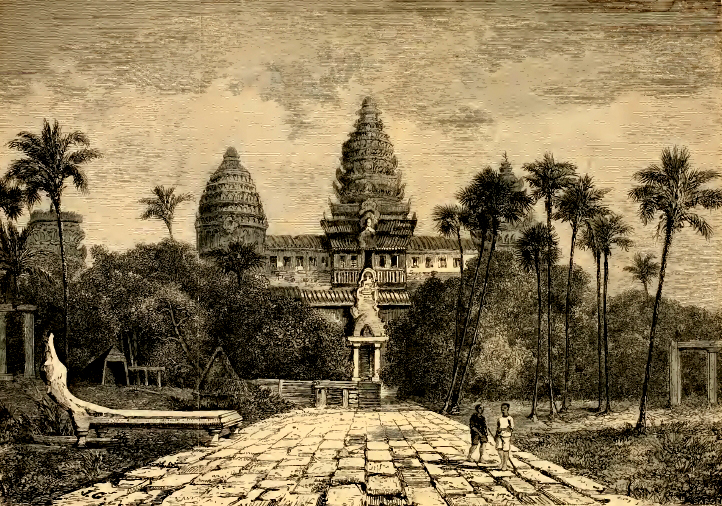
Façade of Angkor Wat by Henri Mouhot.

By the end of the 19th century, the ruins of Angkor had become a tourist destination in the Far East. Travel brochures advertised exotic adventures in French Indochina that said: "The thrill of discovering the age-old lost Kingdom of Angkor at sunset, a vast city of crumbling rock, half concealed by the cruel tentacles of the jungle is a pinnacle experience.” Major steamship lines and new air routes were en route to Southeast Asia.

The origin of the Grand Hotel d’Angkor is linked with a mid 1920s proposal to construct five hotels throughout Cambodia and Annam. In 1923, architect and town planner, Ernest Hébrard, inaugurated the 'Indochina Architecture and Town Planning Service' based in Hanoi, which was responsible for the design of many of the public buildings and city squares across the region. In an article published in "L'Éveil économique de l'Indochine" on 22 December 1929, it detailed a contract executed by the Société des Grands-Hôtels Indochinois (S.G.H.I.) to build hotels in Siem Reap, Phnom Penh, Da Lat and Phan Thiết for the expansion of the Bungalow d'Angkor.

In Siem Reap, a proposal outlined the construction of a 60-room hotel which would replace the native lodges that were no longer suitable for the needs of the growing number of travelers flocking to Angkor. Historian Georges Groslier was consulted concerning the location of the new hotel. It was determined that a 'grand hotel’ was to be built in the centre of town along the main road to Angkor. The hotel was aligned with Angkor Wat and the city of Angkor Thom across a north-south axis that links the royal family's summer palace in Siem Reap province.

=== 1929 Construction and 1932 opening ===
The opening date of Grand Hotel d'Angkor is difficult to establish due to the lack of documentary evidence mostly lost during the Khmer Rouge and civil wars. From a 1929 document, it appears that the hotel was already under construction with a projected opening by 1931. Information written in 'L’Indochine: revue économique d’Extrême-Orient' on 5 June 1930, mentions that the Société des Grands Hôtels Indochinois (S.G.H.I.) is building a palace in Angkor, which will include 70 rooms and will open in a few months." It was later reported that on 11 March 1931, Eugène Jean Louis René Robin, then the governor general of French Indochina, "left the capital of King Monivong to visit the 60-room hotel which has just been built and which only remains to be fitted out. The hotel, along with the Bungalow d'Angkor (Hôtel des Ruines), located in front of Angkor Wat, with 45 rooms, will be able to accommodate all the tourists from Bangkok." The construction appears to have lagged with the advent of the Great Depression. Based on records, the hotel began to function only during the 1932-33 season.

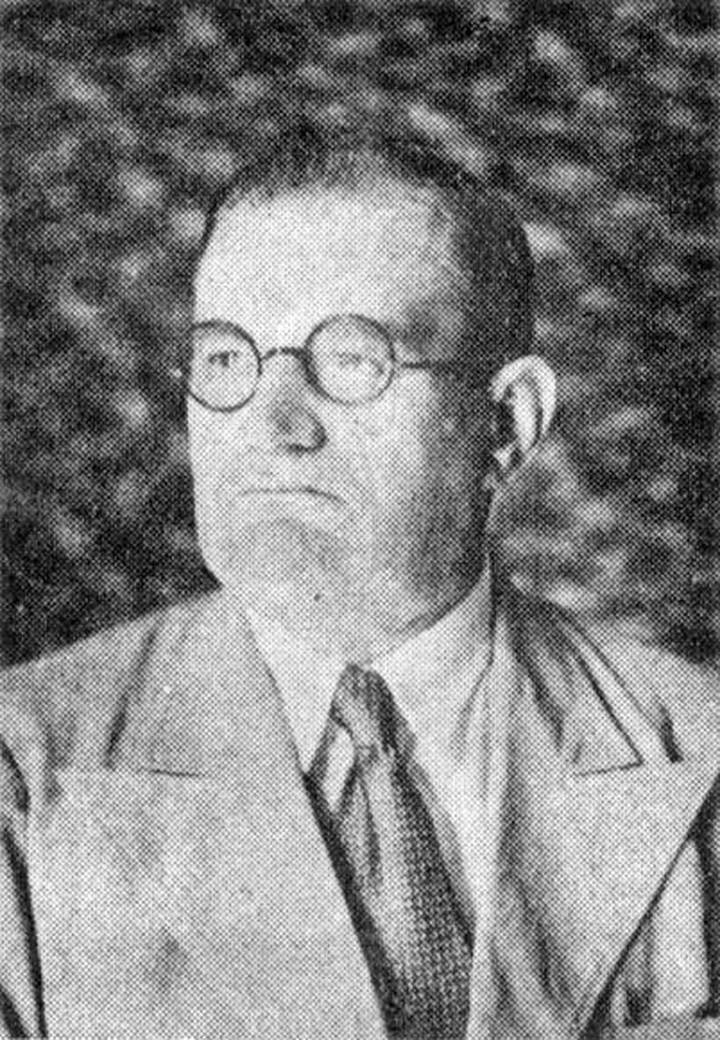
Alfred Messner, general manager

In April 1932, Alfred Messner (1880-1943), proprietor of La Pagode in Saigon and "best known as a restaurateur and hotelier," was named director of the Grand Hotel. In July 1932, the 'Journal Officiel de L’Indochine' published a formal notice seeking a general manager of the Grand Hôtel de Siemréap et de l’Hôtel des Ruines d’Angkor. The Hôtel des Ruines (also known as Bungalow des Ruines or Bungalow d'Angkor) became a partner hotel under the same management. On the same year, Messner was duly appointed as General Manager. In a 'L'Éveil économique de l'Indochine' article dated 6 March 1932, it said, "Mr. Messner has big plans. He wants to make the Grand Hotel and Bungalow d'Angkor a place of delight, which tourists will dream of when they leave it and where they will only have the ambition to return."

Messner produced a booklet titled, ‘Archaeological Guide to Angkor’ which was compiled by École française d'Extrême-Orient conservator Henri Marchal and was printed in Saigon. An advertisement inside the guide advertises the two hotels “replete with all modern comforts”. During the mid-1930s, room rates at the hotel were between 6 and 15 ‘piastres’ a night, with breakfast charged at 1.50 and lunch or dinner at 2.50. A ‘piastre’ was the Indochina dollar, equivalent to about 10 French francs at the time. By 1939, the rates had risen slightly for rooms to between 10 and 12 piastres per person per day.

British author H.W. Ponder mentioned the newly-built hotel in her book, ‘Cambodian Glory’ published in 1936. Being essentially a romantic writer, she preferred to stay at the ‘bungalow’ that faced the ruins, rather than the “immense and dazzling white concrete palace that would look more at home on the Côte d’Azur than in its present setting in the middle of the Cambodian plains.” She likened the building's style to hotels in Nice, Monte-Carlo or along the French Riviera. When the bungalow had been temporarily closed in favor of the new hotel, Ponder was forced to travel by local transport to Grand Hotel d'Angkor where she described the “delicious food and wine (that) is immediately set before you”. She recounted that all the ‘table-boys’ were French-speaking, having been recruited in Saigon and they continually insisted the English woman translate everything that a visitor was bound to ask into ‘American!’ Ponder also noted a large area to the rear of the hotel had been cleared and leveled by the manager for golf "a small private course that was added at the request of the wealthy Americans."

The manager published leaflets advertising the program of Khmer dances by the Royal Ballet. The dancers, under the direction of Princess Vong Kat, had performed in the Palais d’Angkor, a replica of Angkor Wat at the 1931 L’Exposition Coloniale de Vincennes in Paris. A poster, a reminder of the colonial exhibition, can be found today at the end of the corridor on the ground floor of the hotel.

To celebrate Christmas in 1936, General Manager Alfred Messner arranged the illumination of Angkor Wat accompanied by music and dancing. According to a newspaper article in 1936, Siem Reap has seen an excess of 3,400 tourists, prompting the provincial administration into action. In an effort to further beautify the town, plans were drawn to expand the public gardens. The huge space in front of the Grand Hotel d’Angkor was levelled and filled for the planting of a formal garden which still exists today. Gardens were also developed along the terraces of the Siem Reap River.

=== 1953 Postcolonial Cambodia ===
In an explosion of youthful vigor and exuberance that accompanied the declaration of independence from France on 9 November 1953, Prince Norodom Sihanouk launched into a campaign of urban planning, development and construction that transformed many provincial centers. The early Sihanouk era from 1955 to 1965 saw immense growth within Cambodia, along with a fervent striving for international recognition and a modernization program that saw Siem Reap blossom. During this period, tourists were able to travel to Siem Reap from Phnom Penh by boat cruising the Tonle Sap River or travel overland from Sisophon to Angkor. In 1953, tourists entered Cambodia through the capital city of Phnom Penh by ship from Singapore via Bangkok or by a bus service from Saigon, or for wealthier tourists, by flying. Architect Henri Chatel was appointed to renovate and enhance the hotel between 1957 and 1958 offering single air-conditioned rooms with bath for 459 Riels.

On 24 August 1959, the newly established royal government sponsored the creation of La Société khmère des Auberges royales (S.O.K.H.A.R.), a concessionary hotel company "primarily responsible for organizing world-class accommodations" ^{[1]} in the gateway town of Siem Reap. The Grand Hotel d'Angkor became the company's flagship property while it also managed the l’Auberge des Temples (formerly l'Hôtel des Ruines), the royal guesthouse Villa Princière (now Amansara), and the smaller l'Hôtel de la Paix. M. Ang Kim Khoan was appointed as General Manager of S.O.K.H.A.R., "a dynamic man and a great traveler himself, and who is well aware that in the hotel industry "le client est roi" ('the customer is king')."

The Grand Hotel d'Angkor had "retained its sixty rooms, fifty of which are air-conditioned, all elegantly furnished and naturally equipped for individual comfort." In the lobby, multilingual staff was available at the front desk. It has two dining rooms. The first was a large glass-enclosed terrace that accommodated eighty to one hundred guests and overlooked the forest and the towering spires of Angkor Wat from afar. The second room, also air conditioned, was located on the newly outfitted right wing: it accommodated 150 guests and served "the finest French cuisine, accompanied by wines from the best vintages in France." Leading onto the right side of the lobby was "a spacious bar stocked with drinks from the best world brands."

A regional tourism office was inaugurated inside the hotel offering tourists "adequate equipment, including a fleet of cars including Pullman coaches, high-class touring cars, off-road cars for difficult access tracks and... specially trained elephants for those customers who want [to] exhaust the sum of the picturesque attractions of the region." In addition was a souvenir shop selling "the most beautiful products of Khmer craftsmanship: cut leather, silverware, bamboo or rattan objects, statuettes and the finest silk in the region." ^{[1]}The Royal Air Cambodge also opened an agency inside the Grand Hotel following the first plane that landed in Siem Reap's new domestic airport in 1963. Every Saturday evening, the hotel organized, "at the forecourt of the Angkor Wat temple, a recital of Khmer classical dances given by the best dancers of the province dressed [in] sumptuous traditional costumes." ^{[1]}

Moviemakers took advantage of the setting of the temples at Angkor. 'L'Oiseau de paradis,' a French film starring Cambodian Princess Norodom Buppha Devi and directed by Marcel Camus was filmed in Siem Reap and was released in 1962. Lord Jim, a 1965 British-American adventure film adaptation of Joseph Conrad's novel was mainly shot in the temples and jungles of Angkor in 1964. The picture was produced and directed by Richard Brooks with casts including Peter O'Toole, James Mason, Curd Jürgens, Eli Wallach, Jack Hawkins, Paul Lukas, and Daliah Lavi. A stream of international visitors, heads of state, luminaries, and the rich and famous continued to flock at the Grand Hotel d'Angkor.

According to the directive of Mr. Nhiek Tioulong, who was then Minister of State for Planning and Tourism and chairman of the board of directors of S.O.K.H.A.R., works and modernizations were immediately undertaken in other hotels in the country including the l'Hôtel Le Royal in Phnom Penh as well as other concession establishments, bungalows, motels and villas in Pochentong, Kampot, Sihanoukville, Bokor, Kirirom and Kep-sur-Mer.

=== 1967 Civil War and 1975 Khmer Rouge Era ===
By the late 1960s, Sihanouk's delicate domestic and foreign policy balancing act was beginning to go awry. From June,1970 the hotel was taken over by the Cambodian military, Siem Reap was surrounded by the Khmer Rouge, the temples housed hundreds of refugees from the country-side. Food, vegetables and fish, had to be smuggled into SiemReap through the Khmer Rouge lines.The only way in or out of Siem Reap was by Cambodian military air transport. Before the US/Vietnamese military invasion of Cambodia on April 30, 1970, guests at the Grand Hotel d'Angkor could still enjoy a superior category of service for rooms between $5.35 and $8.90 US dollars, with full board offered between $12.85 and $16.40. An 'English Breakfast' cost $1.20 and lunch and dinner were priced at $3.15. Traditional entertainment such as Khmer dances at Angkor Wat and shadow puppets were offered during the evenings at a cost of $3.30 and $1.70, respectively. Elephant rides at Siem Reap could be taken at Phnom Bakheng for $3.30 per person, at Angkor Wat for $2.20 or at the hotel for a mere 60 cents. Between 1970 and 1975, Cambodia's troubles were boiling over. The turbulent Lon Nol era had begun, with Cambodia racked by internal political intrigue, American bombing raids, attacks by North Vietnamese and a strengthening of the Khmer Rouge throughout the countryside. During this time, Lon Nol's senior military officials inevitably occupied the Grand Hotel d'Angkor.

Koy Savauu, pastry baker of the Grand Hotel recounted the precise moment the 'dark years' began in 1975. "The hotel had fallen into a state of decided despair. The hotel had not a single guest the day Pol Pot's Khmer Rouge guerillas marched into town." The entire hotel staff, and the city's inhabitants, were given five days to leave Siem Reap. "The rebel army was largely made up of primitive teenagers from the countryside who had never seen a dining room, much less an elevator such as the Grand had. They gawked. They used the bedroom furniture for firewood and drank a can of varnish they found in the basement, believing it to be wine. They staggered out the front door, and within an hour, a dozen of the boy soldiers lay dead on the lawn."

During the 1975-1979 regime of Pol Pot, residents of Siem Reap province were forcibly moved northwards to areas near the Thai border or south toward the province of Kompong Thom. Families were intentionally separated, and most city-dwellers were forced into brutal labor camps. It is reported that bombs damaged l’Auberge des Temples (l'Hôtel des Ruines) that had stood in front of Angkor Wat since 1909. The nearby Angkor Hotel that Air France had recently completed suffered the same fate. It was never to open. Hotels, international tourism, the very concept of leisure became meaningless terms. The Grand Hotel d’Angkor was deserted except for Pol Pot's cadres who took up residence in the hotel that had now been stripped of its furnishings. During the 1980s, following the defeat of Khmer Rouge in 1979, the hotel remained occupied, but this time for Vietnamese forces. The Grand Hotel d'Angkor was plunging into darkness.

A civil war raged during the 1980s opposing the government's Kampuchean People's Revolutionary Armed Forces against the Coalition Government of Democratic Kampuchea, a government in exile composed of three Cambodian political factions: Prince Norodom Sihanouk's Funcinpec party, the Party of Democratic Kampuchea (often referred to as the Khmer Rouge) and the Khmer People's National Liberation Front (KPNLF). The unrest forced the Grand Hotel d'Angkor to be closed. The neighboring Villa Princière, which it also managed, was overrun by soldiers of the genocidal Khmer Rouge.

=== 1991 Paris Peace Agreements ===
Cambodia's reawakening came when Sihanouk led the FUNCINPEC, Khmer Rouge, KPNLF, and PRK into signing the Paris Peace Accords on 23 October 1991. The treaty, signed by 19 governments, offered a comprehensive political settlement aimed at ending the “tragic conflict and continuing bloodshed in Cambodia”. The Grand Hotel d'Angkor reopened again in December 1991 and remained to be an important venue during the peace efforts that was intensified in the early 1990s. One of the most important functions held at the hotel in those early ‘new’ years was a luncheon on 5 August 1992 hosted by Prince Norodom Sihanouk and UNTAC leader, Yasushi Akashi. The guest list included diplomats, UNTAC representatives such as Gen. John Sanderson, SNC leaders - Hun Sen, Khieu Samphon, Ieng Mouly, Prince Norodom Ranariddh and SOC, KP, FUNCIPEC and DK leaders. The landmark event, with a host table and eight guest tables, culminated in the announcement that UN-sponsored elections would be held in Cambodia in May 1993. This helped restore some semblance of normality as did the rapid diminishment of the Khmer Rouge. A new constitution came into force on 24 September 1993, and Norodom Sihanouk was reinstated as the King of Cambodia. The Grand Hotel continued to be operational, but its renowned luster had faded evidently.

=== 1994 Acquisition and 1997 reopening ===
Talks and negotiations to revive two of Cambodia's colonial hotels, Grand Hotel d'Angkor in Siem Reap and Hotel Le Royal in Phnom Penh, started after the Paris Peace Agreements were signed in 1991. The developments of the two hotels were aimed at re-establishing tourism and economic activity in the country. In 1994, Singapore-based Raffles International Limited (RIL), a subsidiary company of DBS Land, was awarded the contracts to redevelop the historic buildings. On 14 December 1994, Cambodian Tourism Minister Veng Sereyvuth announced that Raffles has been selected to operate the Grand Hotel d'Angkor, a project costing $30 million USD. It follows the agreement earlier signed by Raffles International to restore Hotel Le Royal for $25 million. "The combination of the Le Royal Hotel and the Grand Hotel d'Angkor is a unique opportunity in which two of the world's few remaining grand historic hotels are restored at the same time. The Le Royal Hotel is a palace, and the Grand Hotel d'Angkor is a home," said Richard Helfer, founding chairman and chief executive officer of Raffles International. The new company, owners of the world-famous Raffles Hotel Singapore, had previously received multiple accolades for the conservation of its Singapore hotel, which was originally built in 1887.

The extensive renovation and refurbishment immediately started the following year. To ensure the conservation of the original character and grandeur of the two hotels, a historian was appointed during the planning and reconstruction. Curator Gretchen Liu went to London to conduct research on the available archives. In Paris, she visited two museums to locate old photographs and seek details of weddings, parties and other events that took place in the hotels. On 30 December 1997, the Grand Hotel d'Angkor officially reopened as Raffles Grand Hotel d’Angkor. The hotel now boasted a total of 119 rooms, approximately twice the number originally built. A new 'state wing' that perfectly replicates the architectural style of the main building was added to the west and three new expansive bungalows to the east of the swimming pool. The hotel also maintained two open-air performance houses. One is set diagonally opposite the hotel in the public riverside gardens. The other, the Apsara Terrace, situated in the hotel's private gardens. The lobby and corridors have been extended in sympathy with the French colonial and art deco style. The original 1929 wooden-cage elevator, which remained unused for 25 years, was restored to its former glory. Highlights of the renovated rooms include four-poster beds with local handwoven silk as well as wicker furniture. On the walls hang old paintings, maps and photographs selected carefully by curator Gretchen Liu, who also sourced the Khmer antiques and objets d'art that are showcased among the Art Deco furnishings. Four new suites were opened in honor of the early explorers that have been closely associated with Angkor: Henri Mouhot Suite, Louis Delaporte Suite, Henri Marchal Suite and John Thomson Suite. Commenting on the reopening, Prime Minister Hun Sen said: "Raffles International has not only shown perseverance as a serious and long-term pioneer investor, it has also ensured that two famous landmarks of Cambodia take the rightful pride of place among the few remaining grand historic hotels of the world." The opening was attended by Mr. Toan Chhay, Governor of Siem Reap. The lavish occasion continued in With the New Year's Eve gala dinner as well as the New Year's Day sunrise picnic at Preah Khan temple, north of Angkor Wat. Complete with torches lit along the long path to the temple, and dance performances staged for the guests including Singapore Ambassador Mushahid Ali, it was "the first of its kind organized at the temple complex." An emblem symbolizing the hotel's Royal Patronage was designated by King Norodom Sihanouk and can be seen at the porte-cochère, metal keys chains, glassware and hotel stationeries.

Along with the hotel, Raffles International also undertook the enhancement of the park that connects the hotel to the Summer Palace. Now named the ‘Royal Crusade for Independence Gardens,’ the project costed $2 million USD. The garden complex, in addition to the formal garden, consists of an area devoted to the lotus, the sacred Buddhist flower, as well as the River gardens along the banks of the Siem Reap River and the Temple gardens. In 1998, Raffles also restored the 1928 Art Deco-style bridge that spans the river.

=== 2019 Restoration and grand reopening ===
In 2018, Singapore-based Lodgis Hospitality Holdings Pte. Ltd., a joint venture between Warburg Pincus and Vinacapital, acquired the two colonial hotels. Together with the Grand Métropole Hôtel in Hanoi, Vietnam, the new owner now holds an irreplaceable Indochina heritage hotel portfolio. It was later announced that the two Raffles properties in Cambodia will undergo extensive renovations, which include upgrading of the guest rooms, restaurants, swimming pool, tennis courts and meeting facilities. On 1 October 2019, the Raffles Grand Hotel d'Angkor reopened after a six-month closure for refurbishments. The upgrade was led by David Grace Designs, who also headed the interior decoration of the Raffles Hotel Singapore renovation in 1989. 112 of the 119 rooms and suites have been fully restored and updated.

== Architecture ==
The Grand Hotel d’Angkor suggests an international Art Deco style, mirrored in the great European resort hotels of the 1920s and 1930s. It is constructed of concrete, rather than the usual brick in many colonial buildings in French Indochina. Koh Say Wee, the Singaporean architect appointed by Raffles International in 1997 reopening used the terms such as, “French Art Deco…cosmopolitan…with hints of Oriental decorative features” to describe the stylistic elements of the Grand Hotel d'Angkor.

Period architectural details abound throughout the hotel from the ironwork surrounds of the original timber elevator to the floral-motif Art Deco railings on the floors above, extending to the staircase rail. The building features encaustic cement black and ivory floor tiles, a manufacturing tradition first developed in France during the mid-19th century and have become colonial symbols in countries such as Morocco, Vietnam and Cambodia. The wide eaves of the huge, tiled roof are supported at regular intervals by large, tiered concrete supports. These brackets emulate those made of wood that are usually seen bearing the immense weight of Chinese palace roofs.

== Notable guests ==
The Sultan of Johor visited Cambodia in January 1933. The itinerary included a 2-day visit to Angkor. He had arrived in Bangkok from Penang (staying at the Oriental Hotel), then journeyed overland by train to the border post of Aranyaprathet. A four-hour drive had him checking-in to the Grand Hotel d'Angkor by nightfall. Following his stay, the party arrived in Phnom Penh to stay at the Hotel Le Royal. The remainder of the tour took the Sultan to Saigon where he stayed at the Continental Palace Hotel, with various stops throughout Vietnam on his way to Hanoi. The Sultan left Vietnam at the end of the month bound for Hong Kong.

Movie idol Charlie Chaplin and his co-star in ‘Modern Times’, Paulette Goddard, visited Angkor. The wealthy EFEO archaeologist and art historian, Victor Goloubew (1878-1945) hosted their April 1936 visit to the ruins.

Other notable guests include French General Charles de Gaulle in 1966 and Princess Margaret and her husband, Lord Snowdon, in 1969.

In November 1967 the former wife of the late U.S. President Kennedy, Jacqueline Kennedy made her visit fulfilling her "lifelong dream of exploring Angkor Wat's ancient ruins." Jim Gerrand, a filmmaker who was in Cambodia in 1967 was reported as describing Jackie as “American royalty”. “Prince Sihanouk couldn't have got a better emissary to symbolize the attempt to mend fences with America,” Gerrand told the Phnom Penh Post. During her trip, she was listened to renditions of two of the king's jazz compositions 'November Blues' and 'The Evening I Met You,' and attended a private tour, headed by the prince.

In 2002, Raffles Grand Hotel d'Angkor organized an international charity concert entitled “An Evening at Angkor with Jose Carreras.” The dinner, with a price tag of $1,500 per person, featured the Spanish operatic tenor with the Singapore Symphony Orchestra and National Dance Troupe of Cambodia. The event, attended by 1,200 guests including Prime Minister Hun Sen, was held in aid of the Cambodian Red Cross and WildAID. “More than 1,000 people have been involved–from setting up the stage to feeding a thousand covers to lighting thousands of traditional torches in the West Entrance...by some 100 staff of the Grand Hotel d’Angkor,” said the founding chairman and CEO of Raffles International Ltd., Richard Helfer.

== Hotel ==
The hotel is set in a 15-acre estate with 119 rooms including 6 Colonial Suites, 4 Personality Suites named after Henri Mouhot, Louis Delaporte, Henri Marchal and John Thomson, 6 Raffles Suites, 2 Landmark Suites and 2 two-bedroom Royal Villas.

=== Additional services and facilities ===
- Raffles Spa
- Swimming Pool (35 meters)
- Fitness Center
- Meeting Facilities
- Sugar Palm Club (playroom)
- Helipad
- Culinary Garden
- Raffles Arcade (6 boutiques)
- Raffles Butler Service
- Raffles Curated Journeys (temple tours)
- Raffles Tennis Academy
