= Jean Desbois =

20th French architect influential in Indochina

- Born: August 25, 1891; Cherbourg, Manche, France
- Died: September 18, 1971 (aged 80); Lorient, Morbihan, France
- Occupation: Architect

Jean Desbois was a French architect who rose to fame during the 20th century and left significant landmarks in France and in Cambodia such as the Central Market in Phnom Penh.

He was a member of the French Society of Architects (Société des Architectes Diplômés par le Gouvernement) from 1921 until 18 December 1958 when he became an honorary member until 1962.

== Biography ==
=== A young French architect in contact with the masters of his time ===
Jean Ernest Louis Desbois born in Cherbourg in the French department of the Manche on August 25, 1891. He was the son of Ernest Auguste Desbois, who was first of all at 20 years old a drawer, and after he became the head of the tax office, and Amélie Marie Pauline Alexandrine Lemonnier. Jean Desbois studied architecture under the direction of Emmanuel Le Ray at the Regional School of Architecture in Rennes, where he was admitted on July 9, 1910, and obtained a 1st class medal in modelling on July 25, 1913. On September 19, 1913, Jean Desbois moved to Paris to become the pupil of Louis Bernier and Emmanuel Pontremoli in Paris. He graduated from the Beaux-Arts de Paris on November 17, 1920, as a member of its 115th promotion with a project titled A bourgeois property (Houses of dwellings) for devastated regions building new housing for areas which had been negatively impacted by the First World War. He first contract in 1919 was a collaboration with the first French woman architect, Jeanne Besson-Surugue, on the renovation of the Palais-Royal.

=== An architectural contribution to French Indochina ===
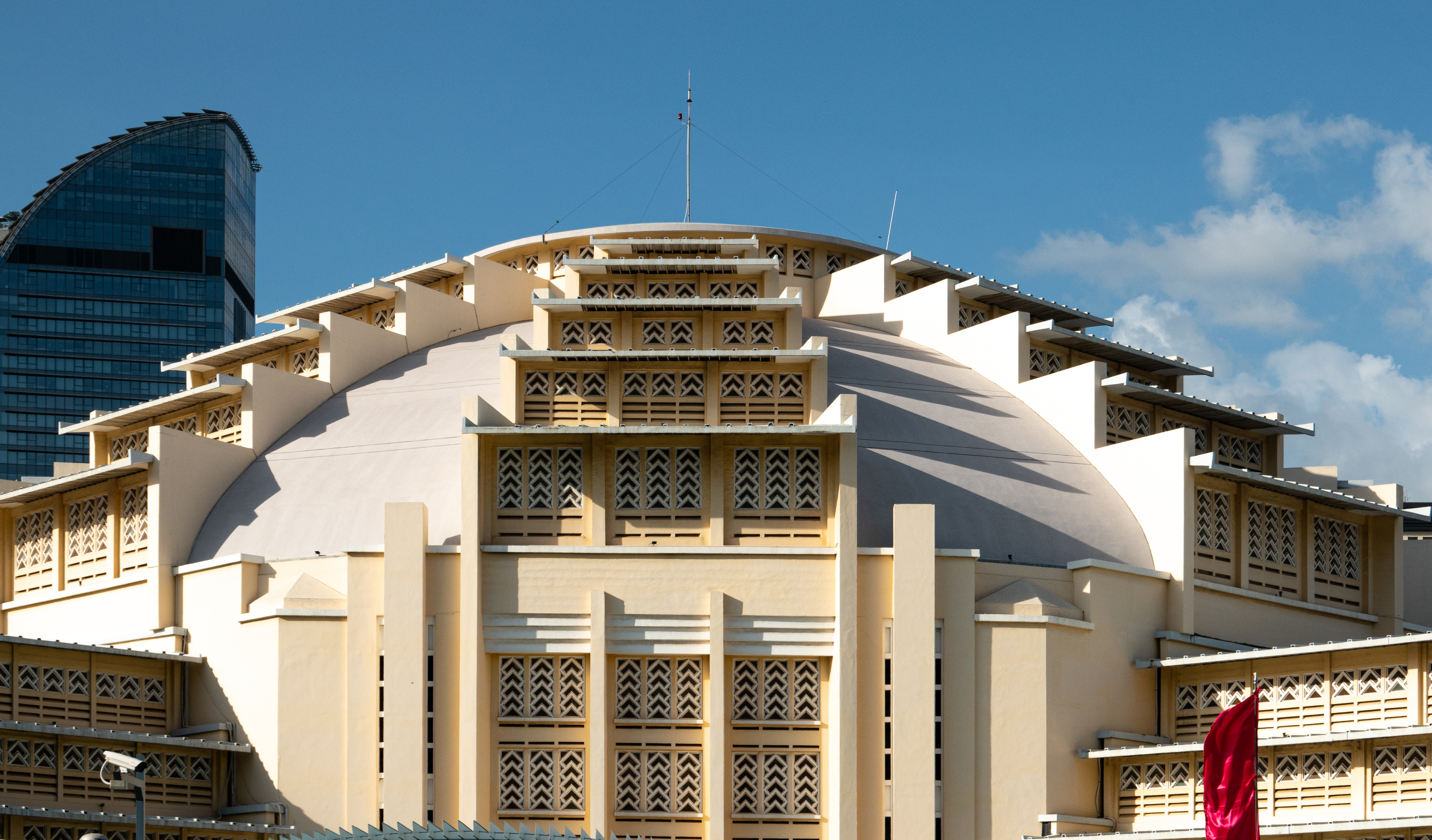
Jean Desbois was the designer of one of the most iconic landmarks of Phnom Penh, the Phsar Thmey.

On March 20, 1922, Jean Desbois started his first job in French Indochina with the Public Works department in Saigon before moving to Phnom Penh in Cambodia where he worked between 1931 and 1937. During his time there, he designed the new Phsar Thmey Central Market in Phnom Penh between 1934 and 1937. Jean Desbois worked with his Excellency King Sisowath Monivong in the 1930s, and notably contributed to the design of the Le Royal Hotel in collaboration with Ernest Hébrard in 1938. He received the honorary title of Knight of the Royal Order of Cambodia in 1924. After building the Central Market in Phnom Penh, Jean Desbois collaborated once again with Louis Chauchon to build a bungalow in Kep, as well as a quarantine pavilion for natives at the Phnom Penh Hospital, security offices in Phnom Penh, the Khmer sports club in Phnom Penh.

Jean Desbois's most notorious architectural legacy in France is the facade of the UGC Normandie Cinema built in 1937 on the Champs-Élysées, the largest avenue in Paris.

He returned to France in 1937 and designed the concertina facade of the Normandy Cinema Hall on the Champs-Élysées, now known as UGC Normandie, which was then the largest cinema hall in Paris.

In 1938, he moved to Hue. On August 7, 1940, Jean Desbois became a Knight of the Imperial Order of the Dragon of Annam by King Bảo Đại.

=== Return to France and retirement ===
When he returned to France, Jean Desbois continued his architectural work in the Breton town of Lorient from 1949 until 1962, where he left a lasting landmark, the Catholic church of Saint Joan of Arc in Lorient.

Jean Desbois died in Lorient on September 18, 1971.

== Legacy: building commercial landmarks in the pearl of Asia ==
Desbois was part of this new movement of French architects in Indochina around the 1930s who created a new colonial style different from their original French style that was not adapted to tropical climates.

The Phsar Thmey was designed by Jean Desbois with the modernist principle in mind that "form follows function". Thus, the market was consciously inspired at the time by recent structures known as German shells in the Munich school of architecture with typical modern markets such as the Centennial Hall in Wrocław built in 1913 or the Leipzig Market Hall built in 1928.

The Central Market rapidly became "a major landmark of Phnom Penh, symbolizing its status as a commercial capital." When it was built, the Central Market was the largest covered market in Asia and it is still considered "one of the great modern edifices of the early 20th century in Asia" by the historian of architecture Brian Brace Taylor. It was the second highest concrete dome in the world reaching 26 meters of height and it was so impressive that it was criticized at the time of its construction as too big for the population of Phnom Penh, which is now a bustling commercial hub.
