= Roman Catholic Cathedral of Phnom Penh =

Cathedral of Christ the King
- Cathedral of Phnom Penh; Cathedral of Christ the King
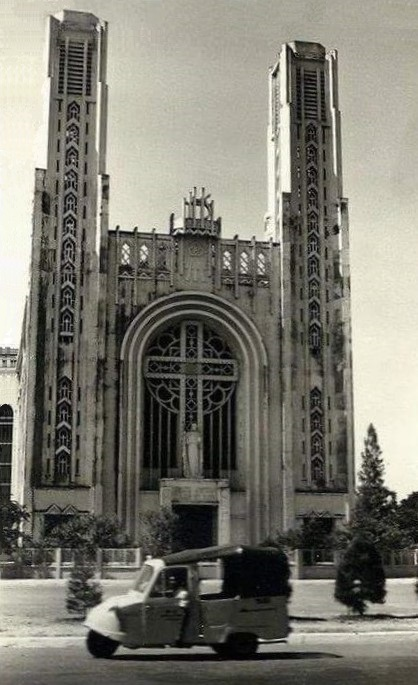
- Cathedral of Christ the King
- 11.5752°N 104.917°E
- Location: Monivong Boulevard, Phnom Penh
- Country: Cambodia
- Denomination: Roman Catholic

History
- Status: Cathedral

Architecture
- Functional status: Destroyed
- Architect(s): Louis Chauchon; Maurice Masson; Henri Chatel
- Style: French Gothic
- Completed: 1927
- Demolished: April 1975

Administration
- Diocese: Apostolic Vicariate of Phnom Penh

Christ the King Cathedral, also known as the Cathedral of Phnom Penh (Khmer: វិហាររាជធានីភ្នំពេញ; French: Cathédrale de Phnom Penh), was a 19th-century French Gothic revival church that served as the cathedral of the Apostolic Vicariate of Phnom Penh. It was located in the Russei Keo District of the city on Monivong Boulevard.

The construction of the cathedral began in the 19th century and was overseen by the French colonial government in Cambodia. The architectural style has been described as resembling Reims Cathedral. Shortly after the Khmer Rouge captured Phnom Penh at the end of the Cambodian Civil War, the cathedral was destroyed.

== History ==
In 1863, Cambodia became a protectorate of France within its colonial empire. Construction of the cathedral most likely started after this time. It was built near the riverfront of the Mekong and was situated at the heart of Phnom Penh on the Monivong Boulevard in the Russei Keo District, a few blocks away from Wat Phnom. A Bishop's Palace and a church library were built adjacent to the cathedral, which was hailed as an "architectural legacy of the French" by The New York Times.

On 26 October 1952, Norodom Suramarit visited the Cathedral.

The grounds of the cathedral was the site of the Russei Keo refugee camp from May 1970 onwards. It harboured 10,000 refugees from North Vietnam who were displaced by the Vietnam War. In October 1972, intense fighting between the Khmer Republic and the Khmer Rouge during the Cambodian Civil War commenced outside of the capital city. One incident resulted in two Khmer Rouge rockets landing behind the cathedral. However, nothing serious arose from the incident. Another similar rocket attack occurred in January 1974. This time, the rectory of the cathedral was damaged.

The Khmer Rouge eventually won the civil war and entered Phnom Penh on April 17, 1975. The new atheistic regime declared the country would go back to "Year Zero" and destroyed anything capitalistic, religious or evoking the colonial past. To the Khmer Rouge, the cathedral epitomized all three characteristics and, as a result, it was the first building in the capital city to be destroyed under their new government. The new regime was so steadfast in attempting to eliminate all forms of religion that it tore the cathedral down stone by stone. All that remained was barren wasteland that did not contain a single trace of the church's existence. In addition to the destruction of the church, the neighbouring Catholic cemetery was converted into a banana plantation and books from the library were burned outside on the church lawn. Dismantled stones from the cathedral were used to reinforce dams for paddy farming. The cathedral was one of all the seventy-three Catholic churches around the country to be obliterated in 1975, the first year of Khmer Rouge rule of Cambodia.

Despite its complete destruction, the empty land where the cathedral once stood became the location of a multi-faith Christmas celebration in 1979, the year the Khmer Rouge's regime was overthrown. The Ministry of Posts and Telecommunications now stands on the site of the former cathedral.

== Architecture ==
The cathedral was built in a French Gothic revival style. The exterior walls of the church were ochre and made of red brick. Located outside the cathedral above the entrance was a statue of the Blessed Virgin Mary. Made of sandstone, the statue was inscribed with the words: "Queen of Justice, Love and Peace." The only existing feature of the cathedral to survive the Khmer Rouge regime is a set of bells that were previously hung in the church's bell towers. They are now situated on the entrance steps of the National Museum of Cambodia.

== See also ==
- List of cathedrals in Cambodia
- St. Joseph's Church, Phnom Penh
- Khmer Rouge rule of Cambodia
- List of churches named after Saint Joseph, this church was dedicated to St Joseph.
- List of destroyed heritage
