= National Library of Cambodia =

National library in Phnom Penh, Cambodia

Coordinates: 11.5765°N 104.9196°E

- បណ្ណាល័យជាតិកម្ពុជា Bibliothèque nationale du Cambodge
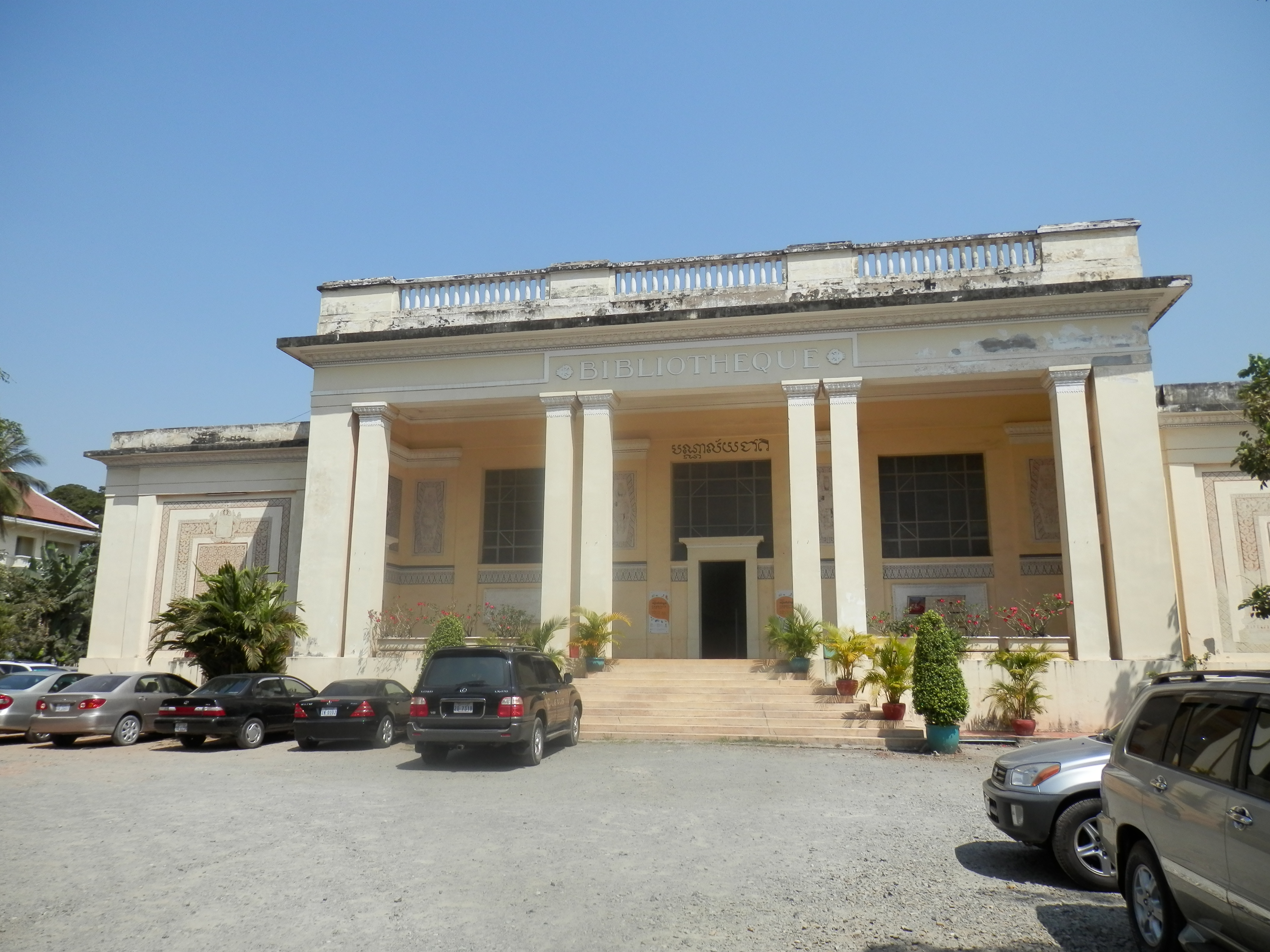
- Location: Oknha Hing Pen St. (61), Phnom Penh, Cambodia
- Type: National library
- Established: 24 December 1924 (101 years ago)
- Architect: Louis Chauchon

Collection
- Size: 103,635

Other information
- Employees: 30
- Website: nlc.gov.kh/en/home/

The National Library of Cambodia (Khmer: បណ្ណាល័យជាតិកម្ពុជា, romanized: bannalycheate kampouchea; French: Bibliothèque nationale du Cambodge) is the national library of Cambodia, located in Phnom Penh, created by France in 1924.

From 1975-1979, the Khmer Rouge destroyed many of the books and bibliographical records, it is commonly thought that about 20% of its 65,000 materials survived, though the true number lost remains unknown.

== History ==
The National Library of Cambodia was inaugurated by the French colonial administration on 24 December 1924 and it was the first project realized by French architect Louis Chauchon. The library had an initial collection of just 2,879 books, mainly in French. Thereafter it was successively managed by French staff until the appointment of the first Khmer Director, Mr Pach Chhoeun, in 1951.

After independence in 1954 there was a steady growth in Cambodian publishing, which was reflected in the increased number of Khmer language books in the National Library.

Closed down in 1975 during the Khmer Rouge era, the National Library was used for several years as accommodation by members of the Pol Pot regime, who destroyed many of the books. The gardens of the library were used to keep pigs and chickens, and their caretakers lived in the library building. The library's skilled workforce was similarly devastated; of the 40 workers from the pre-Khmer Rouge era, only two returned to work at the library afterward. The fates of most others are unknown.

Since 1980 the National Library has been re-established with the assistance of various overseas governments and agencies. Today the National Library of Cambodia holds some 103,635 copies in various languages (Khmer, French, English, German); special collections comprise 8,327 national documents, including documents published in French between 1925 and 1970, plus some books and documents published in the Khmer language dating from the years 1955-1975. There is also a special collection of 305 sastra or palm leaf manuscripts, which are available on microfilm. An exhibition of book plates has been created from the library's collection of colonial-era periodicals, magazines and books; this is permanently on view in the Library’s periodicals room. Managed by the Directorate of Cultural Publications and Reading of the Ministry of Culture and Fine Arts, the National Library is currently staffed by 30 people.

== See also ==
- Destruction of libraries
- List of national libraries
