= Raffles =

Raffles may refer to:

== Singapore ==
- Stamford Raffles, founder of Singapore
  - Raffles Hotel in Singapore
  - Raffles Place, the centre of the Financial District of Singapore
  - Raffles Library and Museum, original institution that is now the National Museum of Singapore
  - Raffles Museum of Biodiversity Research, now part of the Lee Kong Chian Natural History Museum in Singapore
  - Raffles College, now part of the National University of Singapore
  - Raffles Institution, a pre-tertiary educational institution in Singapore
    - Raffles Junior College, a junior college now merged with the Raffles Institution
  - Raffles Girls' School, an all-girls secondary school in Singapore
  - Raffles Girls' Primary School, an all-girls primary school in Singapore

== Fiction ==
=== Literature ===
- A. J. Raffles (character), a fictional gentleman thief in a series of books by E. W. Hornung
  - Raffles stories and adaptations, based on the series of books by E. W. Hornung
- Raffles (character), a fictional German gentleman thief, also known as Lord Lister, originally with similarities to A. J. Raffles

=== Stage ===
- Raffles, The Amateur Cracksman (play) a 1903 adaptation by E. W. Hornung and Eugene Presbrey.

=== Film ===
- Raffles, the Amateur Cracksman (1917 film), a silent adaptation starring John Barrymore and Evelyn Brent
- Raffles (1930 film), a sound adaptation starring Ronald Colman
- Raffles (1939 film), another adaptation, starring David Niven
- Raffles (1958 film), a 1958 Mexican crime film
- Raffles (TV series), a 1977 television adaptation starring Anthony Valentine

== People ==
- Raffles (surname), includes a list of notable people with the surname
- Raffles, nickname of Frank Boucher (1901–1977), Canadian ice hockey player and executive

== Places ==
- Raffles, Cumbria, a suburb of Carlisle, United Kingdom
- Raffles Bay, Northern Territory, Australia
- Raffles Island, Semersooq, Greenland

== Animals ==
- Raffles (horse), a famous Arabian horse stallion
- Raffles's malkoha (Rhinortha chlorophaea), a species of cuckoo

== Business ==
- Raffles (cigarette), a cigarette brand made by Philip Morris, discontinued in 2011
- Raffles City (disambiguation), the name of several building complexes in major cities
- Raffles Hotel (disambiguation), the name of several luxury hotels in major cities

== Education ==
- Raffles Christian School, in Jakarta, Indonesia
- Raffles University, Neemrana, Rajasthan, India

== Other ==
- Raffles v Wichelhaus [1864] EWHC Exch J19, a leading case on mutual mistake in English contract law
- Raffles Haw, a fictional character in The Doings of Raffles Haw, a 1891 moralistic story by A. Conan Doyle
- "Raffles", a 1984 episode of the British sitcom Hi-de-Hi!
- Raffles, variant name of Inside Outing, a video game released in the late 1980s

== See also ==
- Raffle, a game of chance involving numbered tickets
- Ruffle (disambiguation)
