= Central Market (Phnom Penh) =

Market in Phnom Penh, Cambodia

- ផ្សារធំថ្មី
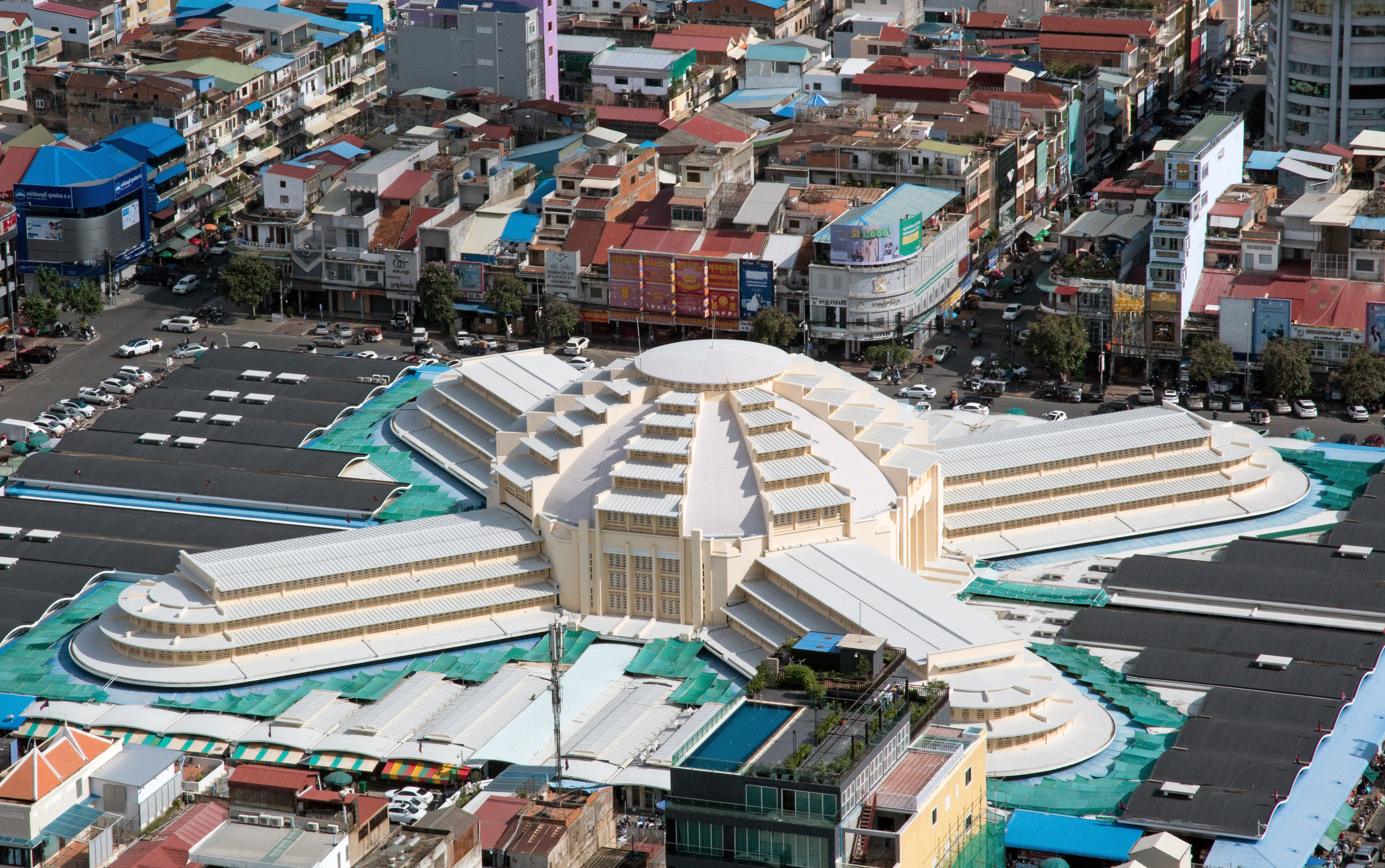
- Aerial view of the market, 2021
- Location: Kamet St. (53), Phnom Penh
- Coordinates: 11°34′10″N 104°55′16″E
- Opened: 1937
- Architect: Jean Desbois; Louis Chauchon
- Floors: 1

The Central Market (Khmer: ផ្សារធំថ្មី, Phsar Thum Thmei; meaning "New Grand Market") is a market and an art deco landmark in Phnom Penh, the capital of Cambodia. The bright yellow building completed in 1937 has a 26-metre high central dome, with four tall arch-roofed arms branching out diagonally across the block, creating vast hallways housing countless stalls and a variety of goods. Initially designed by city architect Jean Desbois, construction works were supervised by French architect Louis Chauchon. When it first opened in 1937, it was said to be the biggest market in Asia; today it still operates as a market.

== History ==
After Phnom Penh became the capital of the French protectorate of Cambodia within French Indochina in 1867, the population grew enormously and the French set about creating a spacious modern city. The decision to build a market dates back to the end of the 1920s in response to the increase in the population to 90,000 inhabitants. It was decided to build it on a marshland in the center of the Chinatown of the time, but the project did not start until 1934 because of the turmoil of the Great Depression. The market was designed by Jean Desbois, the architect of the city from 1931 to 1937, and its implementation was supervised by Louis Chauchon and the engineer Wladimir Kandaouroff. Construction was carried out by the Société indochinoise d'études et de construction (English: Indochinese Company for Studies and Construction), frequently abbreviated SIDEC, which had built the markets of Battambang and Cholon. The marsh was drained and work began in August 1935. Construction was completed 22 months later; the market was inaugurated by King Sisowath Monivong in September 1937.

Since its completion, wet season flooding around the market has remained a problem, a reminder of the marshland it once was. The areas between the four diagonal arms and the surrounding streets were originally planted as gardens; over the years the gardens were gradually filled with various temporary structures, greatly increasing the number of stalls. During the Franco-Thai War in 1941 the market was bombed by Thai aircraft, causing heavy damage, and it had to be temporarily closed. After the end of World War II it was restored much as it was.

From 2009 to 2011, it underwent a US$4.2 million renovation funded by the French Development Agency. This renovation repaired and restored all the original reinforced concrete structure, and added low arched roofed stall areas in the originally open areas on all four sides. The entrances to the market are lined with souvenir merchants hawking everything from T-shirts and postcards to silver curios and kramas. Inside is a dazzling display of jewels and gold. Electronic goods, stationery, secondhand clothes and flowers are also sold.

== Gallery ==
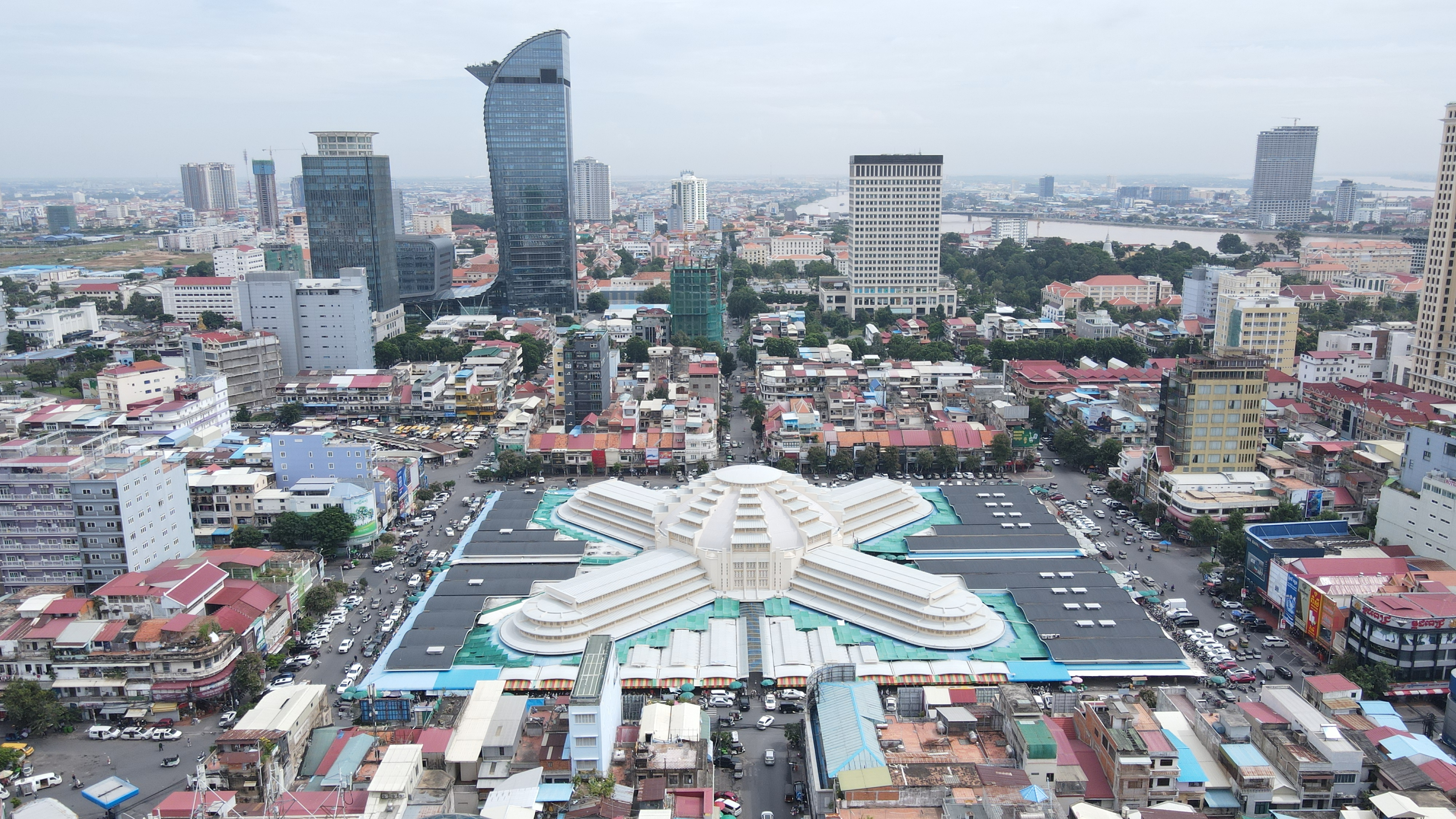
Central Market View from West Side to East

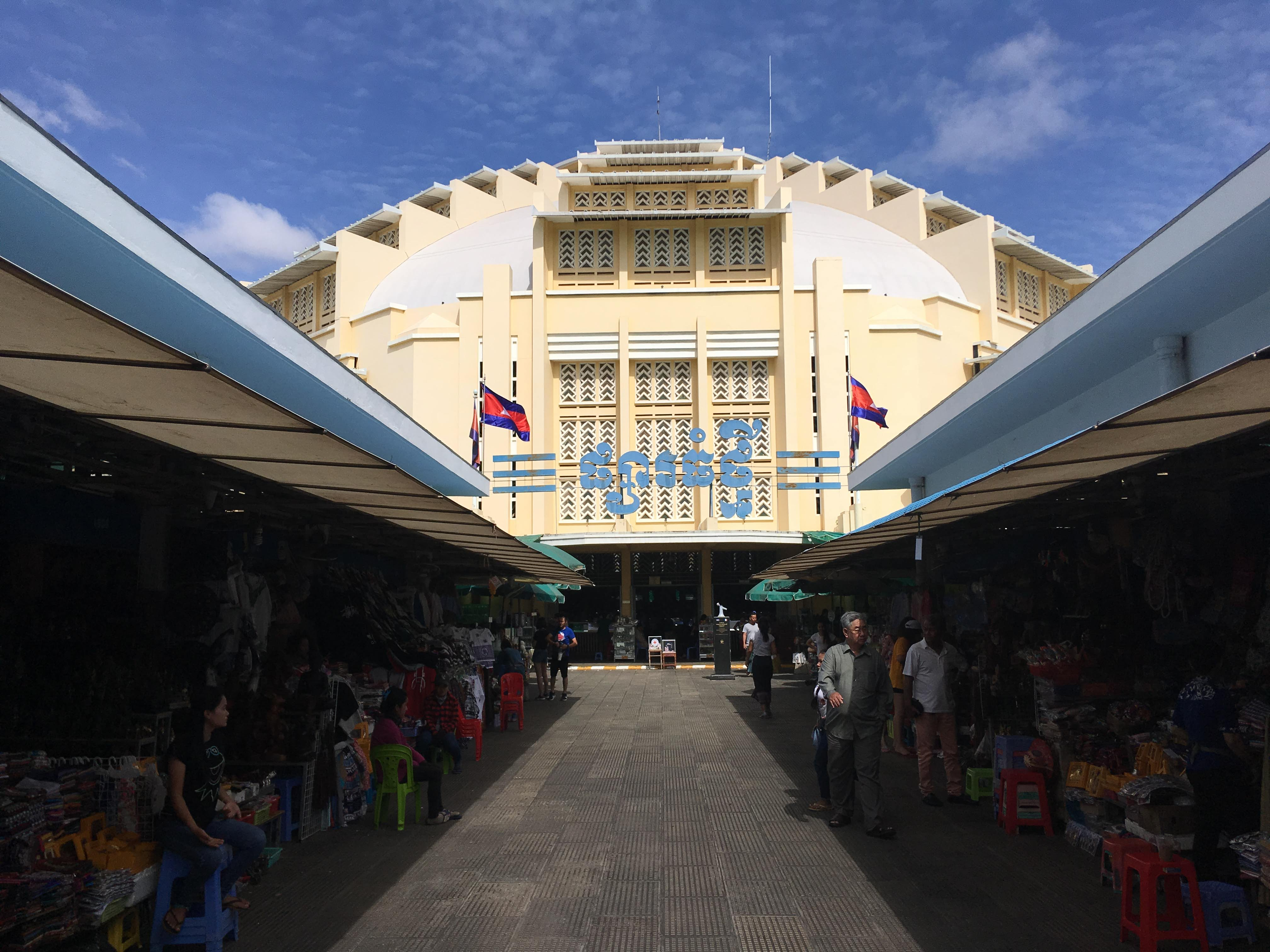
One of the Central Market's entrances

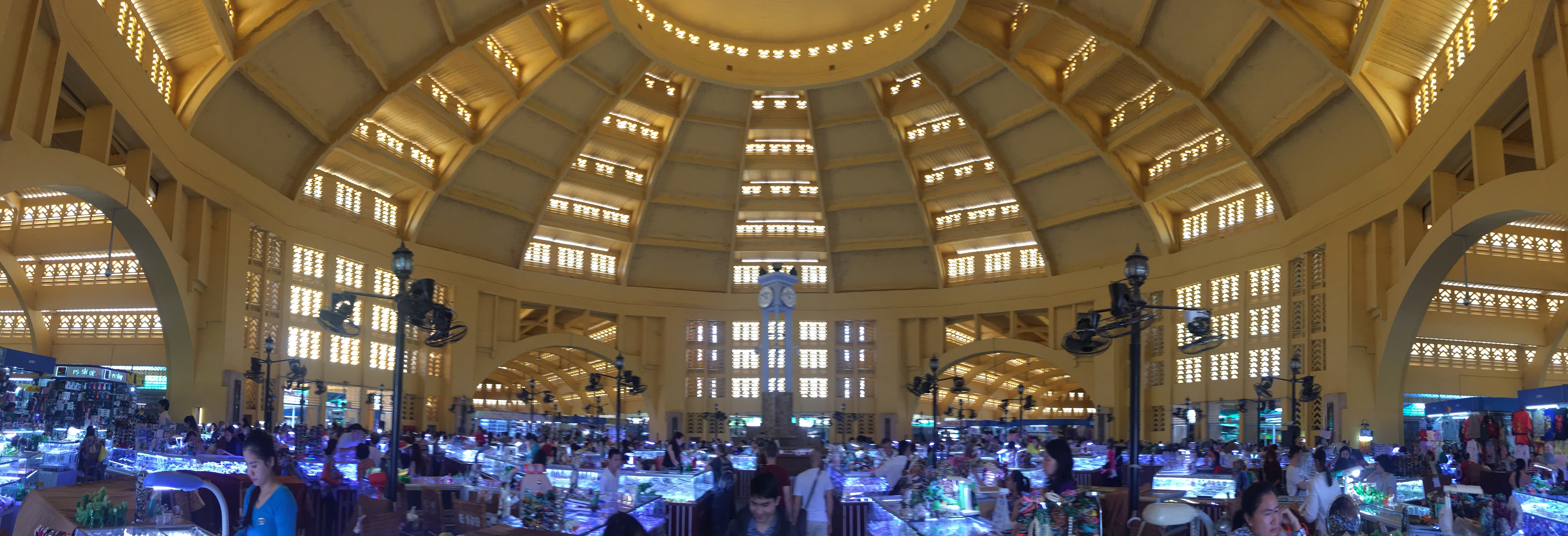
Central Market under the dome

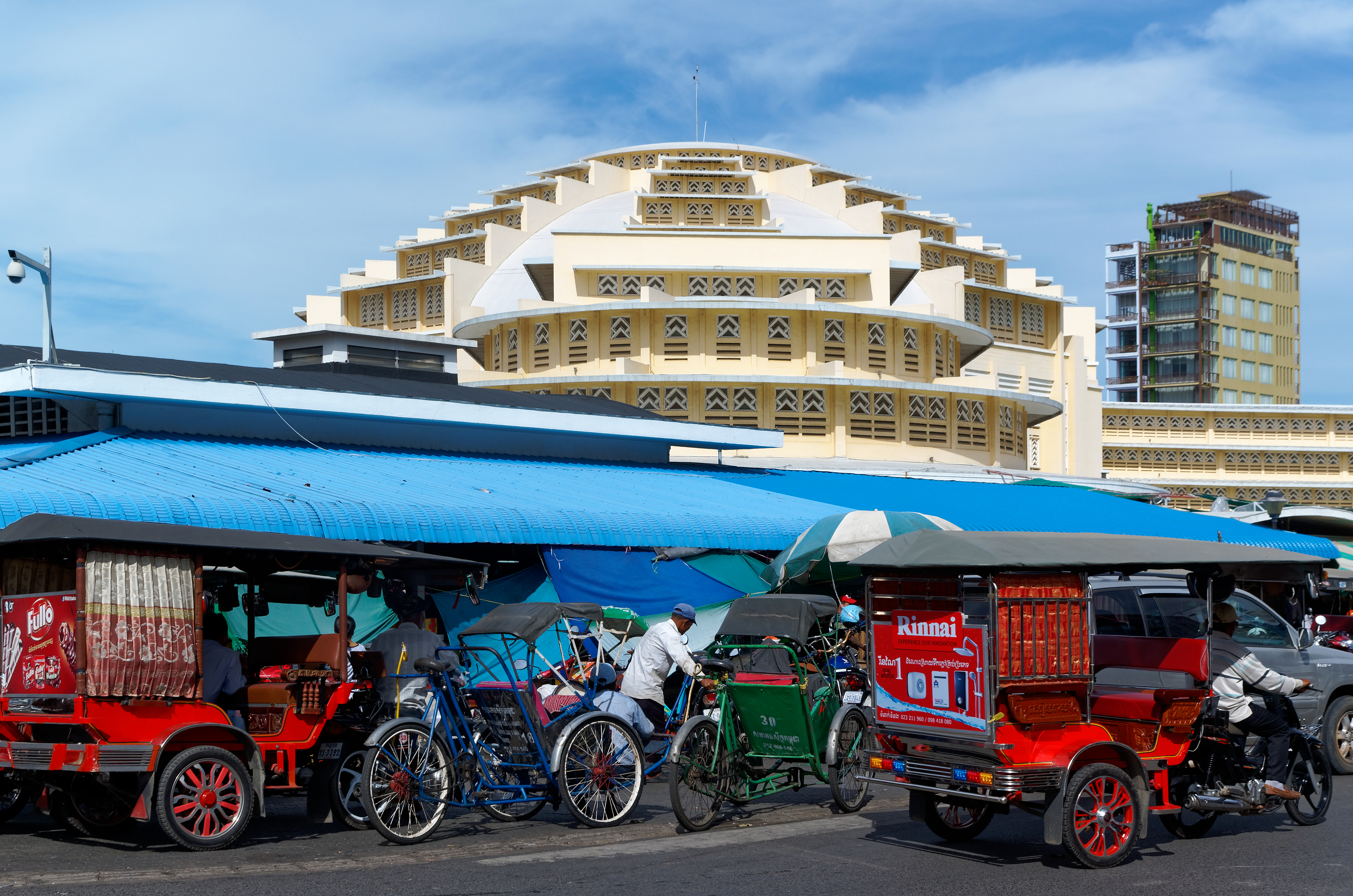
Central Market, Phnom Penh in 2017

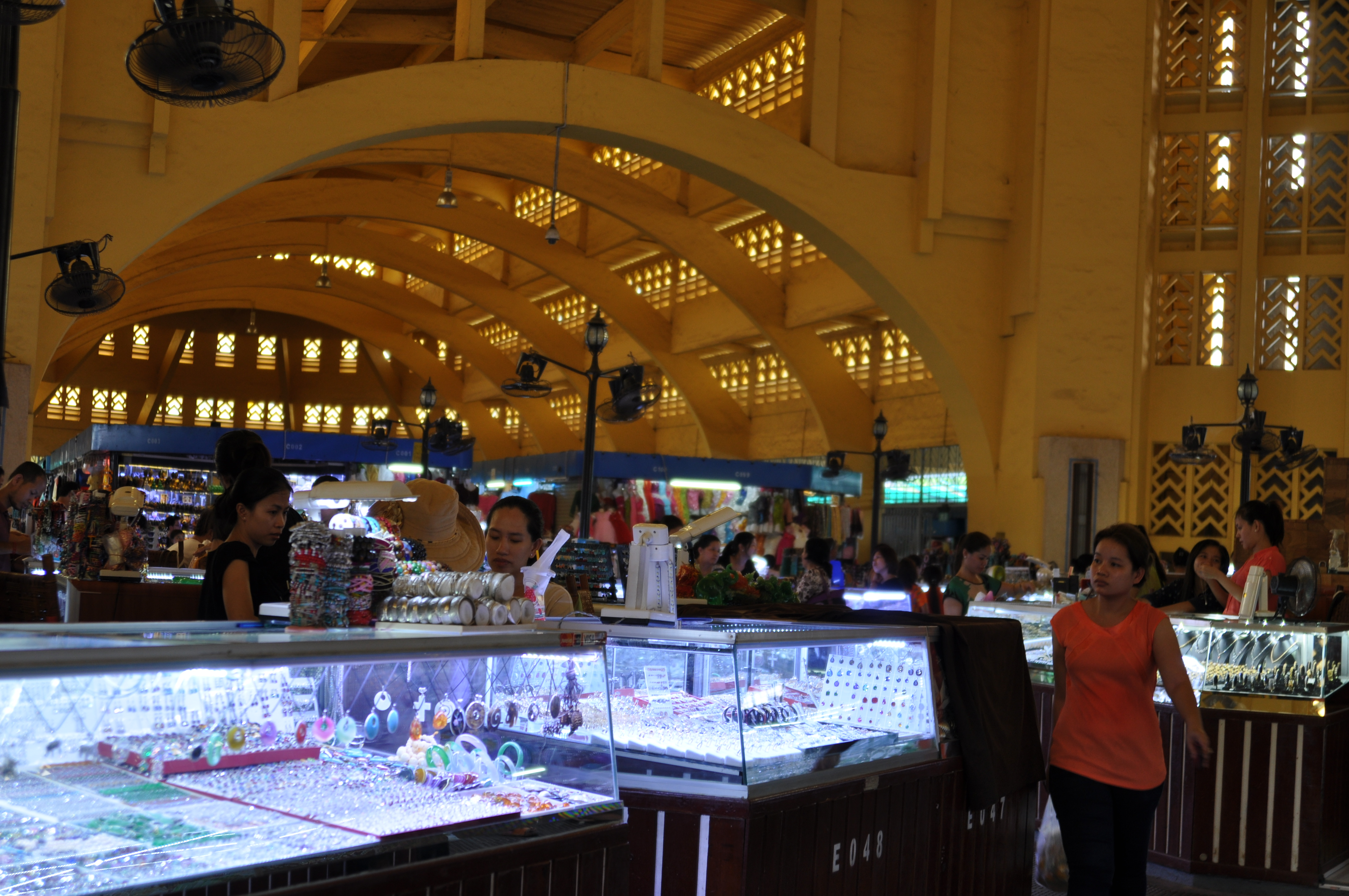
Central Market view into one of the arms 2014

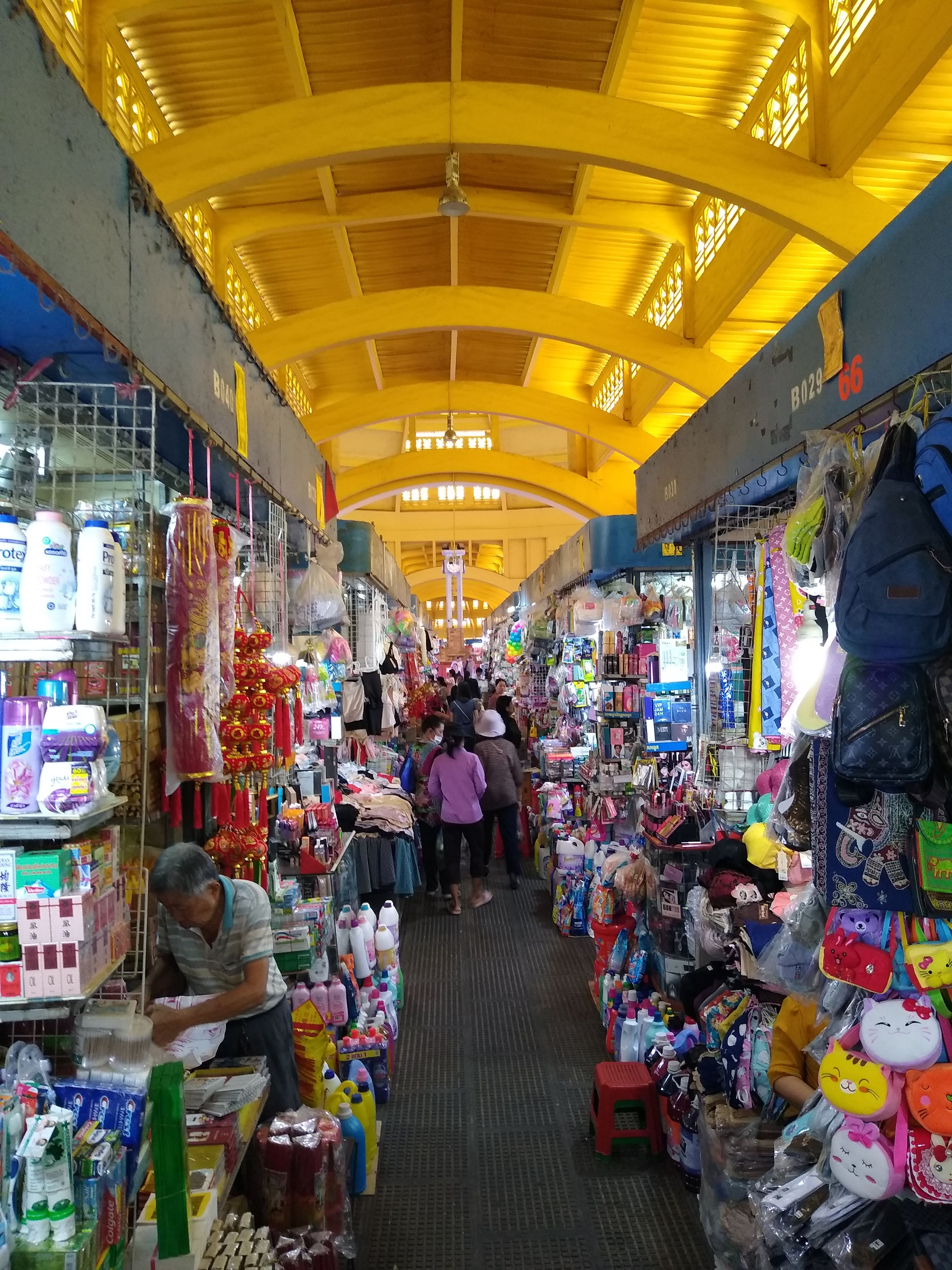
A walkway lined with shops in 2020

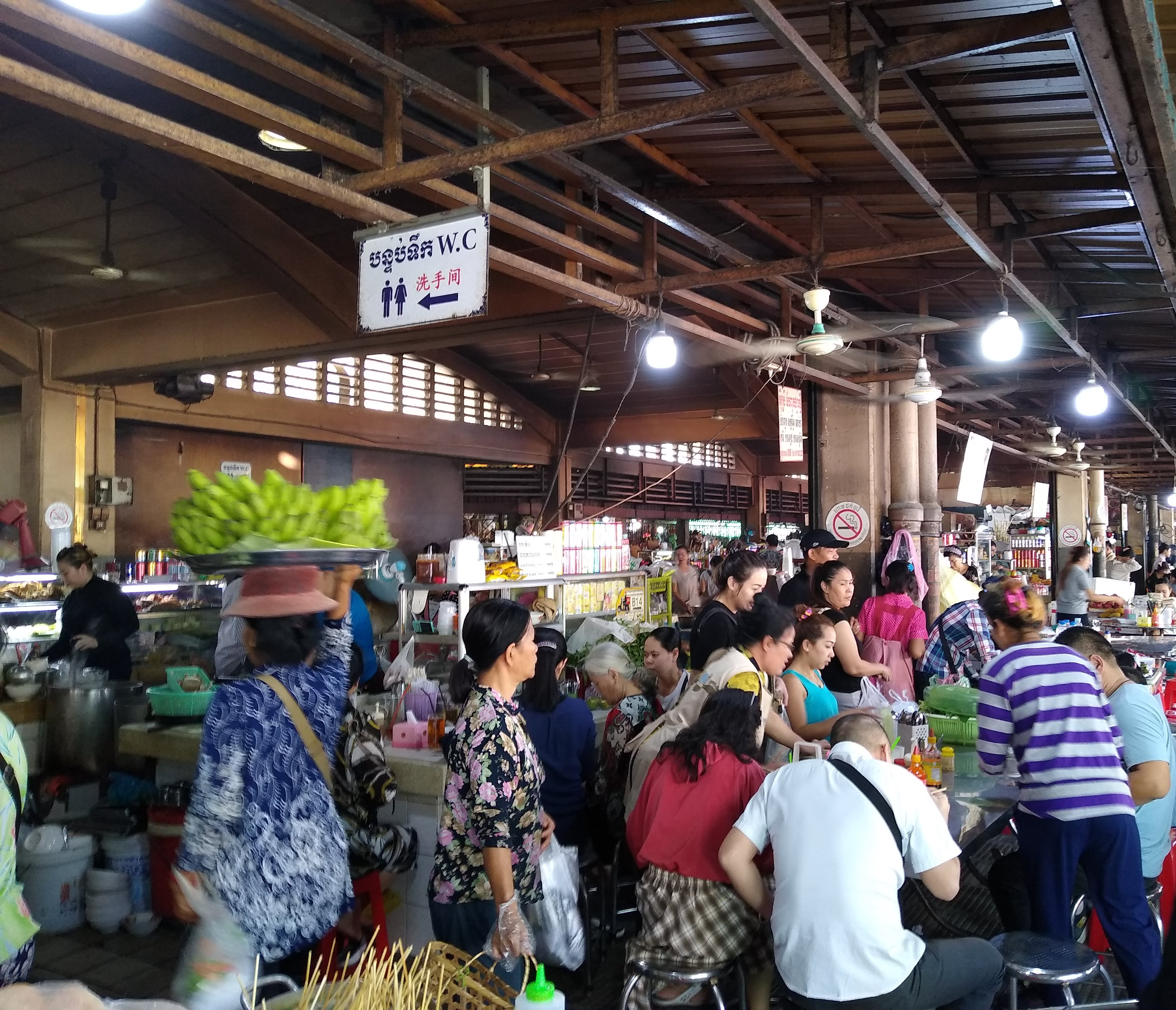
Activity in the market in 2020

== See also ==
- List of markets in Phnom Penh

== Bibliography ==
- Callebaut, Corinne (2011). Marché Central : histoire d'une rénovation = Central Market : story of a renovation. Phnom Penh: Melon Rouge. ISBN 978-99963-511-3-6. OCLC 767615998.
  - About this book:
    - Penh, Melon Rouge Agency - Phnom (2012-02-04). "Portfolio: Publishing, Graphic Design, Web Design, Photography". melonrouge.asia. Archived from the original on 2013-08-29.
