= Maurice Masson =

French architect of the Cathedral of Phnom-Penh

Maurice Masson was a 20th-century French architect who had a prestigious architectural cabinet in Saigon in the 1940s, and who left many landmarks in French Indochina, some still standing, some who have been destroyed such as the former Cathedral of Phnom Penh.

== Biography ==
Maurice Alphonse Mason was born in Paris 3rd on 31 December 1895. He was the son of Eugène Victor Masson, a 33-years old man who worked as a sales representative, and Céline Alice Haché, who was age 24.

During the First World War, he fought with such courage that he was rewarded with the Croix de Guerre.

Maurice Masson began studying architecture as a student of Georges Ruel at the Regional Architecture School of Rouen. On 26 May 1922 he was authorized to transfer his registration to the Beaux-Arts School in Paris, by ministerial letter of 24 September 1923 to become a pupil of Marcel Lambert and Georges Gromort in Paris. He graduated on 9 June 1926 as part of the 133rd promotion.

For a short while Maurice Masson worked as an architect in 8th arrondissement of Paris before moving to Saigon in Indochina in 1936 where he lived for the rest of his life. He began his own architecture firm which became "famous" in Saigon. He was the architect of the Crédit foncier d'Indochine.

In 1940, with Louis Chauchon, he founded the French group of Architects in the Far East which brought together both French and Vietnamese architects based in Vietnam and Cambodia.

He was called to continue the project of the Cathedral of Phnom Penh after Louis Chauchon had died in the bombings of Saigon in 1945. He saw the inauguration of the work and the laying of the first stone in the presence of King Suramarit. However, Maurice Masson died in 1955. The work of the Cathedral was completed a few months afterwards by another architect, Henri Chatel, whom he had hired back in 1949.

== Awards and recognitions ==
Maurice Masson was a member of the French Architects Association (Société des Architectes Diplômés par le Gouvernement) from 1926 until his death. He also received the Croix de guerre and various military medals for his courage in battle during the First World War.

== Bibliography ==
- Herbelin, Caroline (2013). "Changements et opportunités dans l'architecture en Indochine pendant la période de Vichy". French Colonial History (in French). 14: 89–114. doi:10.14321/frencolohist.14.2013.0089. ISSN 1539-3402. JSTOR 10.14321/frencolohist.14.2013.0089.
