= Lady Raffles =

Lady Raffles may refer to:

== People ==
- Olivia Mariamne Devenish, the first wife of Sir Stamford Raffles
- Sophia Hull, the writer and the second wife of Sir Stamford Raffles

== Other uses ==
- Lady Raffles (film), a 1928 American silent film
- Lady Raffles, a ship from London in 1817, which Sir Stamford Raffles, his wife Sophia and 30 others traveled on board from Portsmouth, Hampshire, England, to Bencoolen, Jakarta

== See also ==
- Raffles (disambiguation)
