= Louis Chauchon =

French architect (1878–1945)

- Born: November 24, 1878; Rive-de-Gier, Loire, France
- Died: 1945; Saigon, French Indochina
- Occupation: Architect

Louis Chauchon (1878 – 1945) was a 20th-century French architect who had a significant architectural influence in French Indochina, designing several major landmarks, especially: the Central Market in Phnom Penh, which is still in use today, and the Cathedral of Phnom Penh, which did not survive the violence of the Indochina Wars.

== Early life ==
Adolphe Louis Léon Chauchon was born in Rive-de-Gier in the French department of the Loire on November 24, 1878. He was the son of Jean Pierre Édouard Chauchon, a 25 year-old architect, and Marie Léonie Gory, who was 22 years old.

== Education in Paris ==
Chauchon went to Paris to study architecture at the Beaux-Arts and was accepted in the atelier of French architect Émile Bénard in the 17th arrondissement of Paris on October 7, 1897. On November 3, 1903, he was admitted as a student of Gaston Redon, and with a scholarship offered by the City of Lyon, he obtained his first class degree on July 30, 1906. Chauchon graduated as a full-fledged architect on February 24, 1920, as part of the 112th promotion with a special project on a group of three residences for employees in Buenos-Aires.

In 1921, Chauchon started working as an architect in the 15th arrondissement of Paris, but shortly later, on June 14, applied for a job in Indochina with the Public Works Department for Civil Buildings, and was hired.

== Work in Indochina ==
Chauchon started working as an architect in Cambodia in 1922. The first building he worked on was the National Library of Cambodia, which was inaugurated by the French colonial administration on 24 December 1924.

On 10 January 1925, Chauchon married Madeleine Bayol (full name Joséphine Marie Madeleine Bayol), a schoolteacher, in Phnom Penh. They were granted six months' leave, starting in May, to visit France (presumably this was a honeymoon). They had a daughter, Denise, who was born in 1926.

In 1935, Chauchon took an avant-garde modernist approach when he designed a legal office at 161 Nguyễn Du Street on the corner with Cách Mạng Tháng Tám Street in Saigon's District 1. The building was later used at the Canadian embassy until 1975, and it was until recently used by the immigration department of the city government.

Chauchon later designed the Clinique Saint-Paul, which was opened as a Catholic hospital in December 1938. This new hospital continued the work of the first private clinic of Saigon, which was founded by Dr. Marie Angier de Loheac and the Sisters of Saint Paul of Chartres. The Clinique Saint-Paul is now the Ho Chi Minh City Eye Hospital, with the address 280 Điện Biên Phủ Street in District 3.

In 1937, after Jean Desbois designed the Phnom Penh Central Market project, Chauchon built Desbois's original design. Chauchon's success led to his being appointed Chief Architect of Civil Buildings in Saigon. Desbois returned to Saigon and continued to build private houses for the wealthy. In 1937, Chauchon was also chosen to be the architect of the new Cathedral of Phnom Penh, due to the wishes of Apostolic Vicar Jean Chabalier, and the support of Pope Pius XI.

== Death and legacy ==
Chauchon died in 1945 in an aerial bombing of Saigon that occurred in the opening stages of the First Indochina War. Maurice Masson replaced him as architect of the Cathedral of Phnom Penh.

Chauchon left an important architectural legacy in Indochina. Though influenced by Beaux-Arts architecture, he nonetheless created several art deco landmarks in South Vietnam, like the Clinique Saint-Paul in Saigon: a "formidable art deco building with its horizontal lines emphasized and the wings of buildings ending at the street with giant curved forms". Along with Masson, Chauchon contributed to transforming the architectural style of residential housing in Indochina, and his work history shows that the locale bourgeoisie appreciated the new aesthetic.

The Phnom Penh Central Market is "the principal building" designed by French architects in Phnom Penh. Chauchon was the first to import the new modernist architectural style to Cambodia at a time when there were no Khmer architects. His architectural style shaped the development of Phnom Penh, and strongly influenced the first Khmer architect, Vann Molyvann, who integrated Chauchon's style into New Khmer Architecture.

== Awards and recognitions ==
Chauchon was a member of the French Architects Association (Société des architectes diplômés par le gouvernement) from 1926 to 1945.

In March 1942, Chauchon, with Maurice Masson and Robert Gilles, came first in a competition to design architectural plans for a new university in Hanoi being planned called Cité universitaire (English: City University). Their design, titled "Le jardin symbolique" (English: "The Symbolic Garden"), won them a 3,000 piastre prize.
