= Raffles Hotels & Resorts =

Luxury hotel chain

- Type: Subsidiary
- Industry: Hospitality
- Founded: 1989; 37 years ago
- Number of locations: 25
- Area served: Worldwide
- Key people: Omer Acar (CEO Raffles & Orient Express)
- Services: Luxury hotels
- Parent: Accor
- Website: raffles.com

Raffles Hotels & Resorts is a Singaporean chain of luxury hotels which traces its roots to 1887 with the opening of the original Raffles Hotel in Singapore. The company started to develop internationally in the late 1990s. Since 2015, Raffles has been a part of Accor.

== History ==
Raffles Hotels & Resorts was formed in 1989 to restore, redevelop and manage the historic Raffles Hotel in Singapore. The corporation also undertook the restructuring and management of the Raffles City development, thus laying the foundation for Raffles Hotels & Resorts to become a hotel management company. After a complete restoration, the Raffles Hotel reopened on 16 September 1991.

In April 2001, Raffles Holdings acquired Swissôtel from SAirGroup for 268 million euros, thus increasing its room capacity by 139% to 13,500 units in 17 countries.

In 2005, Colony Capital bought Raffles Holdings for $1 billion from the Singapore government. Raffles and Swissôtel joined Fairmont Hotels in the newly formed holding, FRHI Hotels & Resorts, in 2006.

In December 2015, Accor announced the acquisition of FRHI Hotels & Resorts, taking over the Fairmont, Raffles, and Swissotel hotel chains. The $2.7 billion deal was finalized in July 2016.

In December 2020, Accor announced that it would be opening a new hotel in Moscow, next to the Kremlin, in the second half of 2022. However, in March 2023, it was confirmed that the new hotel was cancelled due to the Russian invasion of Ukraine.

== Properties ==
Property	No. of rooms	Country	Year opened	Notes	References
Raffles Hotel	115	Singapore	1887	Restoration	
Raffles Hotel Le Royal	175	Cambodia	1997	Restoration	
Raffles Grand Hotel d'Angkor	119	Cambodia	1997	Restoration	
Raffles Dubai	246	United Arab Emirates	2007	Newly built	
Le Royal Monceau, Raffles Paris	149	France	2010	Restoration	
Raffles Makkah Palace	213	Saudi Arabia	2010	Newly built	
Raffles Praslin, Seychelles	86	Seychelles	2011	Newly built	
Raffles Makati	32	Philippines	2012	Newly built	
Raffles Hainan	331	China	2013	Newly built	
Raffles Istanbul	181	Turkey	2014	Newly built	
Raffles Jakarta	173	Indonesia	2015	Newly built	
Raffles Europejski Warsaw	106	Poland	2018	Restoration	
Raffles Shenzhen	168	China			
Raffles Bali	32	Indonesia	2020		
Raffles Udaipur	101	India	2021		
Raffles The Palm Dubai	389	United Arab Emirates	2021	Takeover	
Raffles Doha	132	Qatar	2022	Newly built	
Raffles Boston Back Bay	147	United States	2023	Newly built	
Raffles London at The OWO	120	United Kingdom	2023	Restoration	
Raffles Al Areen Palace, Bahrain	78	Bahrain	2023	Restoration	
Raffles at Galaxy Macau	450	Macau	2023	Newly built	
Raffles Jaipur	50	India	2024	Newly built	
Raffles Sentosa Resort & Spa	62	Singapore	2025	Newly built	
Opening soon
Raffles Jeddah	182	Saudi Arabia	2026	Newly built	
Raffles The Red Sea	135	Saudi Arabia	2026	Newly built	
Raffles Cairo	184	Egypt	2026	Newly built	
Raffles Lake Como	84	Italy	2027	Restoration	
Raffles Tokyo	157	Japan	2028	Newly built	
Former Properties
Raffles Beijing	171	China	2006	Restoration	
Raffles Maldives Meradhoo	37	Maldives	2019	Newly Built	

== Other products ==
=== Raffles Residences ===
Raffles Residences is a collection of private residential suites and apartments that are serviced by Raffles Hotels & Resorts and are usually connected to a Raffles-branded hotel. There are currently three Raffles Residences with more scheduled to be completed in the next few years.

Property	No. of Rooms	Country	References
Raffles Estate Praslin	14	Seychelles	
Raffles Residences Makati	130	Philippines	
Raffles Residences Jakarta	80	Indonesia	
Raffles Residences Doha	49	Qatar	
The OWO Residences by Raffles (2023)	85	United Kingdom	
Raffles Residences Boston Back Bay (2023)	146	United States	
Raffles Residences Jeddah (2024)	188	Saudi Arabia	

=== Raffles 1915 Gin ===
In 2015, to commemorate the 100th anniversary of the Singapore Sling, Raffles Hotels & Resorts partnered with London-based microdistillery Sipsmith to create a brand-made gin, the Raffles 1915 Gin.

=== Soirées, Sojourns & Stories by Raffles ===
Released in 2018, Soirées, Sojourns & Stories by Raffles is a book highlighting the history and some of the iconic guests of Raffles Hotels & Resorts.

=== The Butler Did It ===
In 2026, a ready-to-wear and lifestyle brand entitled “The Butler Did It” was launched by Raffles. The line is available exclusively at Printemps stores in Paris and New York City. The line is designed by Jessica Diehl.
