= Hotel Europejski =

Hotel in Warsaw, Poland

Coordinates: 52°14′30″N 21°0′52″E

Raffles Europejski Warsaw

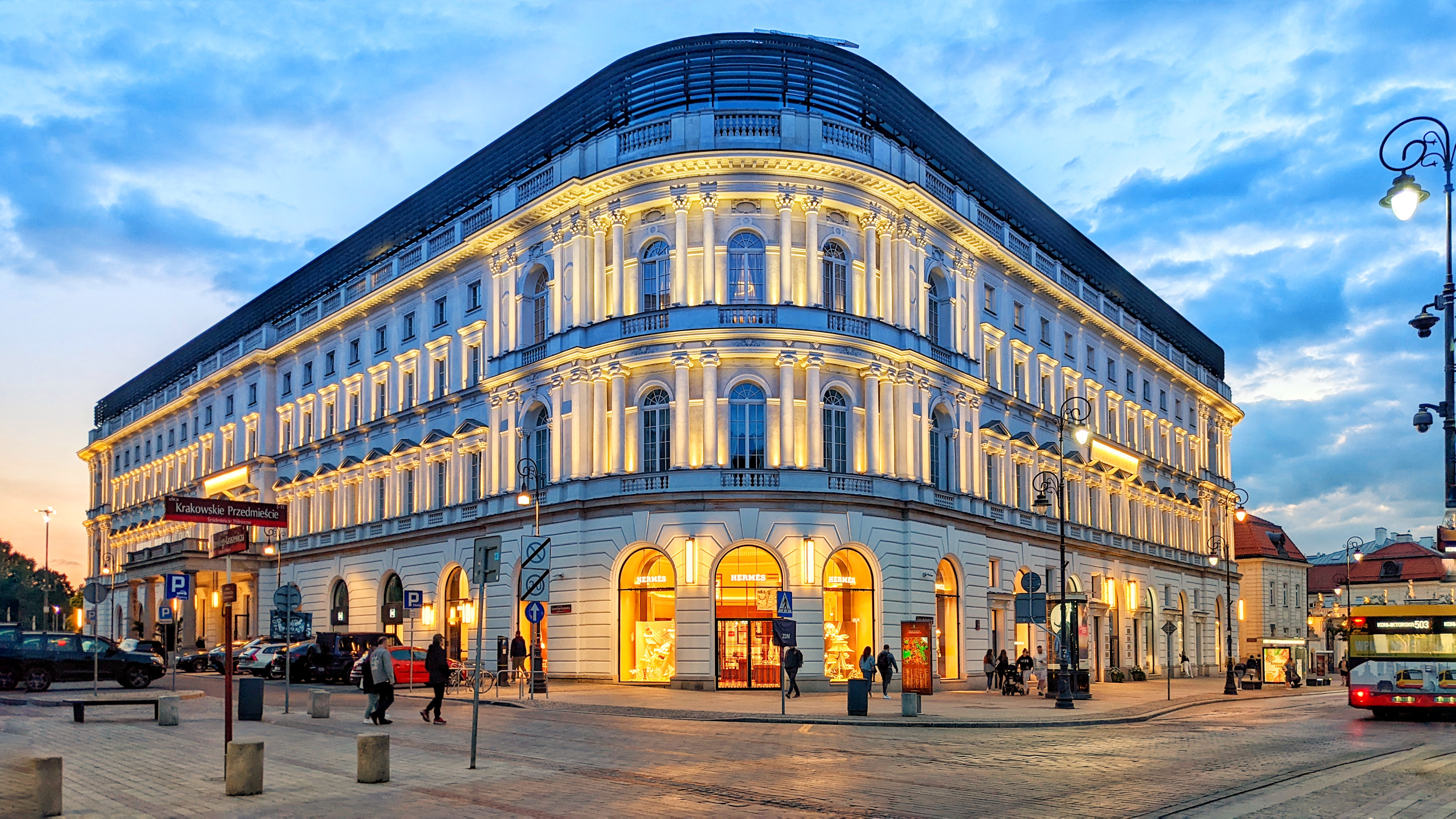
- Hotel Europejski
- Interactive map of the Raffles Europejski Warsaw area

General information
- Location: Warsaw, Poland, Royal Route, Krakowskie Przedmieście 13
- Opening: January 1, 1857 (original building), July 2, 1962 (current building)
- Owner: Przeździecki and Pusłowski families, (1857-1912), Preździecki and Czetwertyński families, (1912-1921); Hotel Europejski S.A. - HESA (1921-1948), Polish Ministry of National Defence (MON) (1948-1956), Orbis (1957-2005), Hotel Europejski S.A. - HESA (2005-)
- Operator: Raffles Hotels & Resorts

Design and construction
- Architect: Enrico Marconi

Other information
- Number of rooms: 106

Website
- raffles.com/warsaw

Historic Monument of Poland
- Designated: 1994-09-08
- Part of: Warsaw – historic city center with the Royal Route and Wilanów
- Reference no.: M.P. 1994 nr 50 poz. 423

Raffles Europejski Warsaw, commonly known as Hotel Europejski, is a historic five-star luxury hotel located in the city centre of Warsaw, Poland. At the time of its opening in 1857 it was one of the most modern and luxurious European hotels.

Situated along the Royal Route, the building was designed by Polish-Italian architect Enrico Marconi and has since been one of Warsaw's architectural symbols. Badly damaged during World War II, it was systematically rebuilt at a great expense throughout the 1950s, reopening as a hotel in 1962. Managed by Raffles Hotels & Resorts, it reopened on 1 June 2018 after extensive renovation with 106 rooms, restaurant, bar, spa and Lourse pâtisserie, as well as offices on the top two floors and a luxury shopping center.

== Overview ==
It is located on the historical Royal Route and close to Warsaw Old Town. Facilities include an art gallery and a coffee and pastry shop. The rooms vary in size and shape and most have views overlooking historic parts of Warsaw, including the Royal Tract and the Pilsudski Square.

== History ==
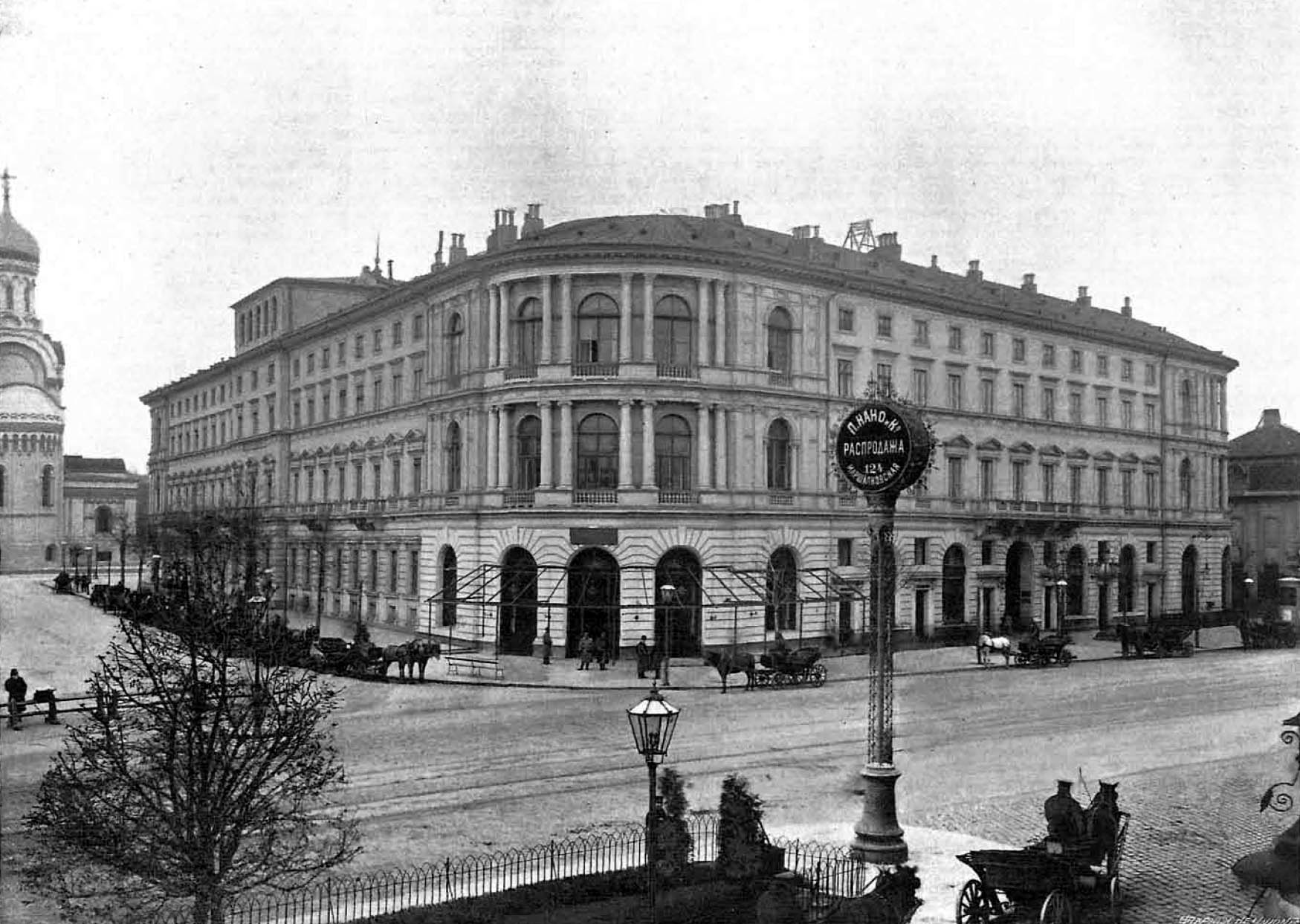
Hotel Europejski as it appeared prior to World War I.

=== Early years ===
The hotel originally opened on January 1, 1857. Designed by Enrico Marconi, it was one of the most luxurious hotels in the Russian Empire, which stretched from Europe to Alaska. From 1915, the architect Antoni Jawornicki, was responsible for many of the upgrades to the hotel including moving the main entrance and building two ballrooms in the courtyard. In 1921, the hotel's owners, the Przeździecki and Czetwertyński families formed the joint stock company, Hotel Europejski Spółka Akcyjna (HESA).

=== World War II ===
The hotel was renamed the Europäisches Hotel by the Germans during the occupation in World War II and used to house Wehrmacht officers exclusively whilst keeping a large portion of the pre-war Polish staff. It was severely damaged after the Warsaw Uprising in December 1944 and January 1945 by the retreating Germans.

=== Post WWII nationalization and reconstruction ===
In 1945, after the liberation of Warsaw, the original owners received permission from the government to rebuild the hotel and commenced by setting up a restaurant in the surviving section of the building. However, before they could rebuild the whole hotel, the property was seized by the government in 1948 as a result of the Bierut Decrees. The building was rebuilt during 1949–1951 to designs by Bohdan Pniewski to serve as a military school. Major structural changes included adding a balustrade along the top, and reconstruction of the ruined sections of the exterior. Many surviving elements of the interior were removed, including the grand staircase and ballrooms, replacing them with dormitories, classrooms and a gymnasium. The building served as the Military Political Academy (Akademia Wojskowa Polityczna) from 1951 to 1954, and then as offices for the Ministry of Transport. In 1956 the Polish government decided to return the building to its former use as a hotel. From 1956 to 1957, the empty building was used to house Jewish emigrants from the Soviet Union.

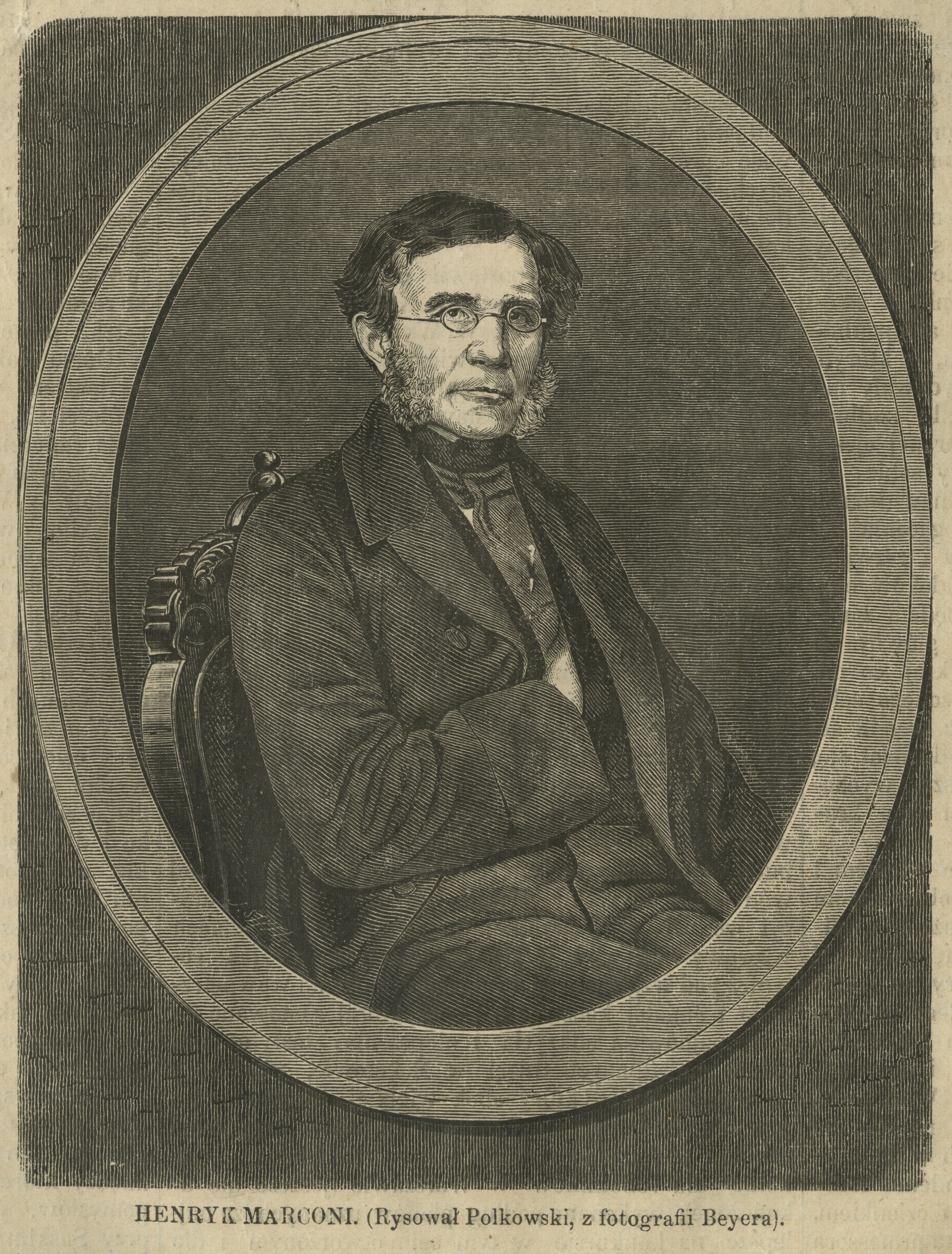
Enrico Marconi, the architect who designed the building

The building was transferred to the Orbis state tourist company in 1957 and converted back to a hotel, with Bohdan Pniewski again serving as architect, along with Bohdan Kijowicz. The resulting hotel had 260 rooms and 13 suites. It reopened to guests on July 2, 1962, as the Orbis Hotel Europejski. In 1965, The Golden Gate Quartet performed their only concert in Poland here.

During the following decades, some of the notable guests of the hotel included: Robert Kennedy, Marlene Dietrich, The Rolling Stones, Indira Gandhi, Günter Grass, Artur Rubinstein, Mstislav Rostropovich, Czesław Miłosz and Lech Wałęsa.

After the fall of communism, in 1993, the heirs of the hotel's original owners sued to regain the hotel from the state-run Orbis Hotels chain. The case took 12 years, as Orbis claimed they had constructed the current building and invested a great deal of money in it. The heirs were ultimately successful in their lawsuit, and the hotel was closed down by Orbis on June 30, 2005. The hand-over was completed later that year on September 1. While preparations were made for a complete restoration, spaces on the ground floor were rented out to shops and cafes, and the former hotel rooms and apartments in the building were rented out as offices. The structure was completely closed in 2013 in anticipation of the impending reconstruction.

=== Restoration ===
Reconstruction began in July 2013 and the building reopened in May 2018 with a 106-room hotel managed by Raffles Hotels & Resorts as Raffles Europejski Warsaw, 3,000 m^{2} of retail space on the ground floor, and 6,500 m^{2} of Class A office space on the top two floors, 4,000 m^{2} of which is operated by WeWork as shared office space.

== Gallery ==
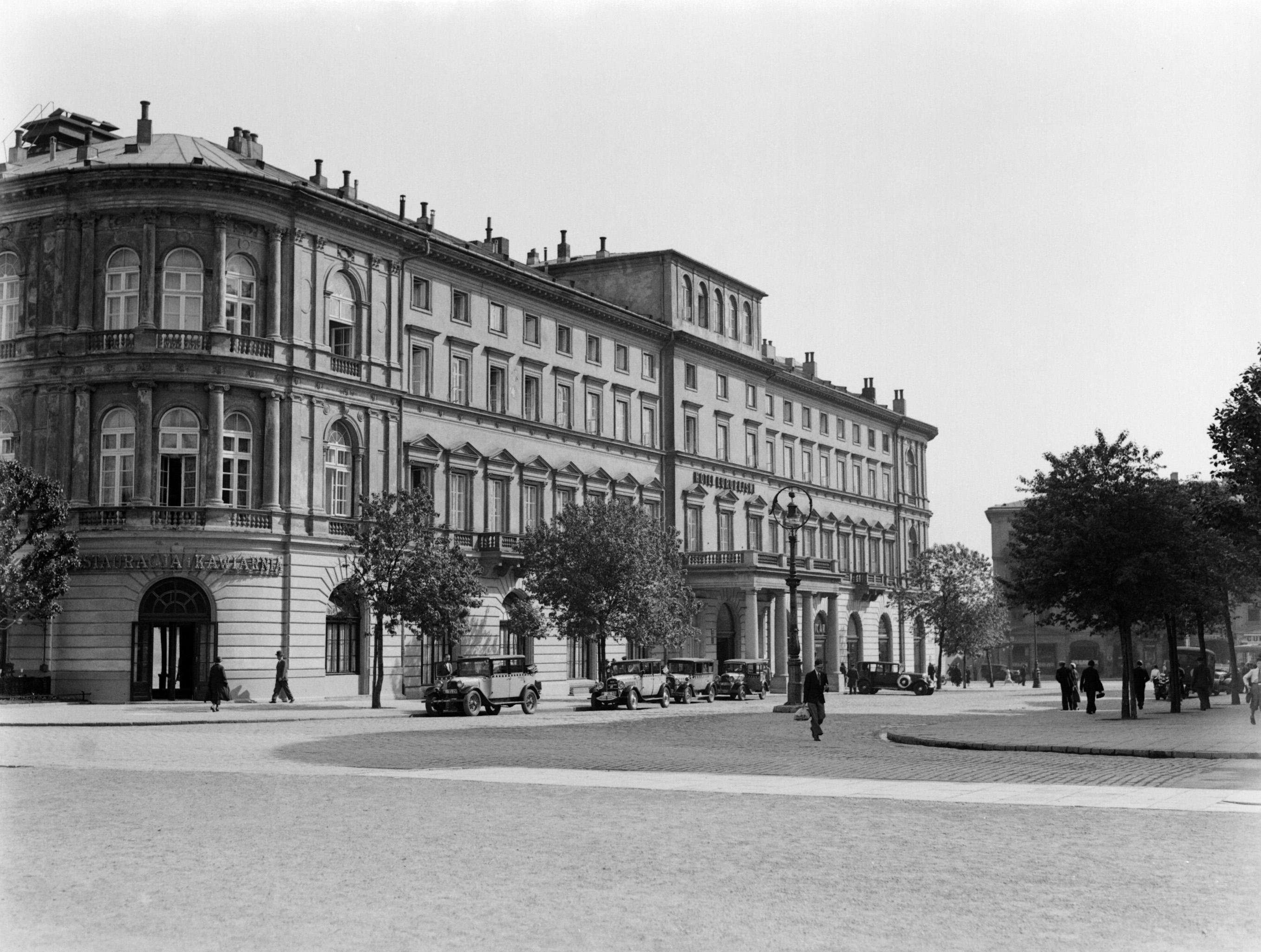
Hotel Europejski in 1934

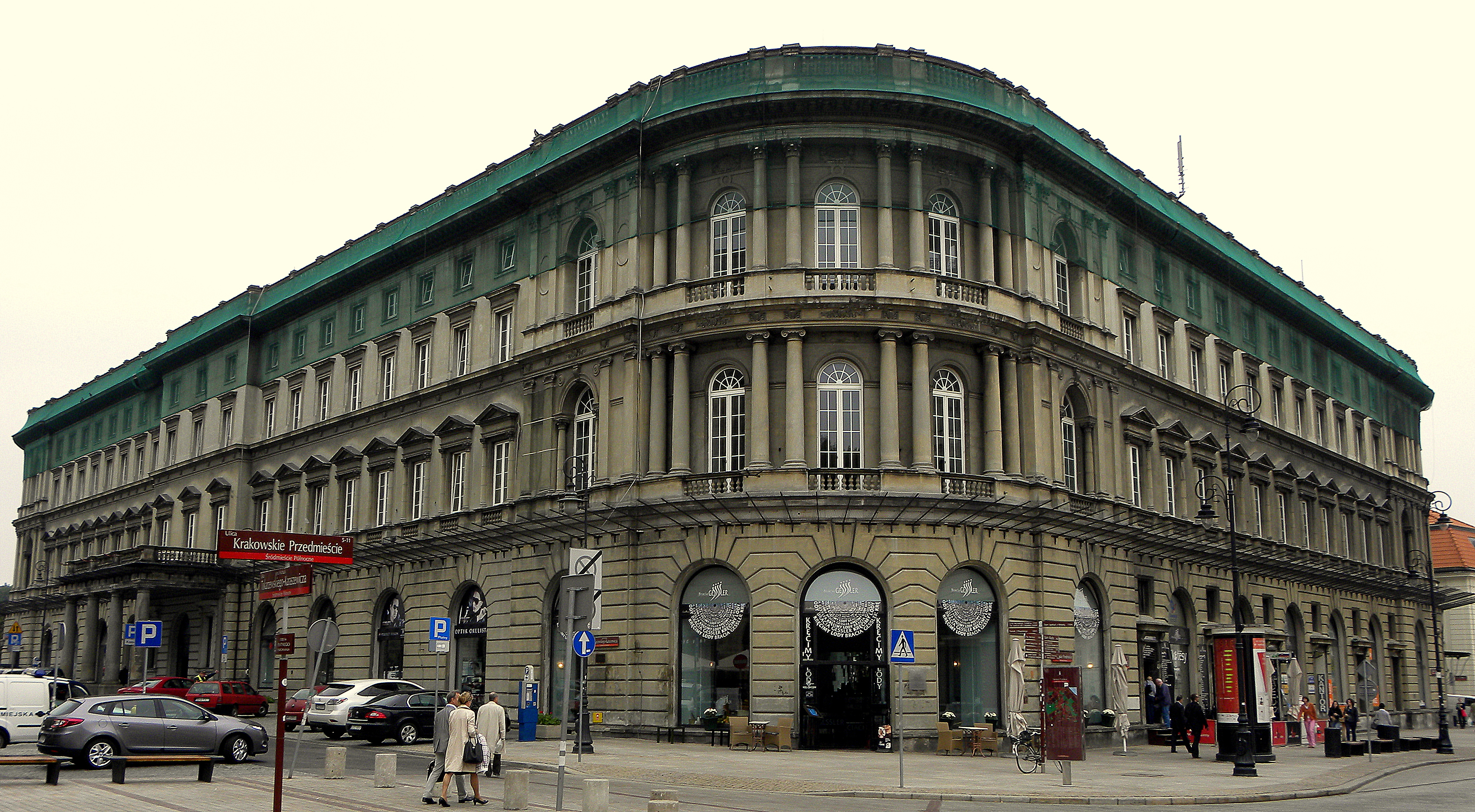
The hotel before renovation in 2011

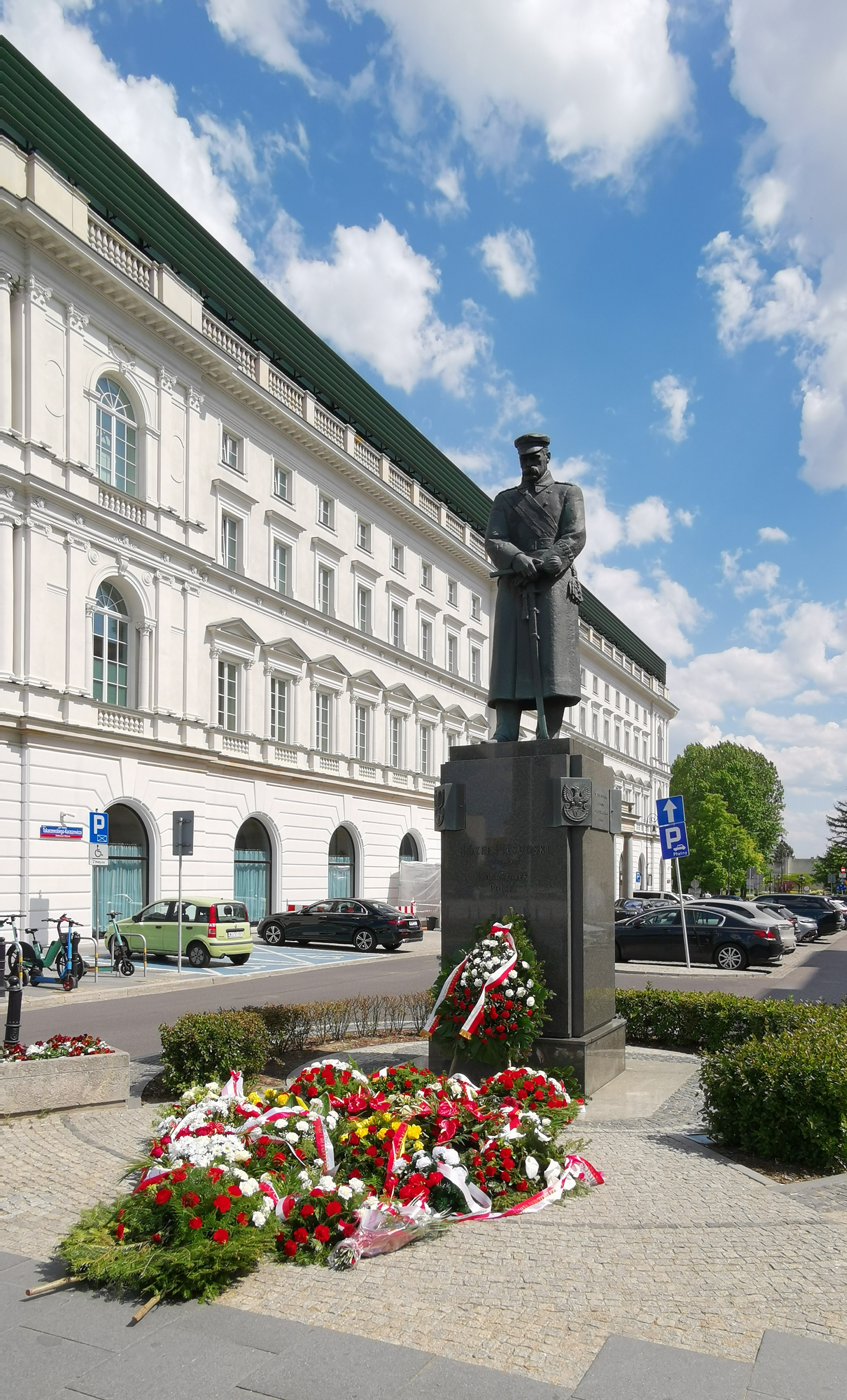
Józef Piłsudski Monument located near the hotel

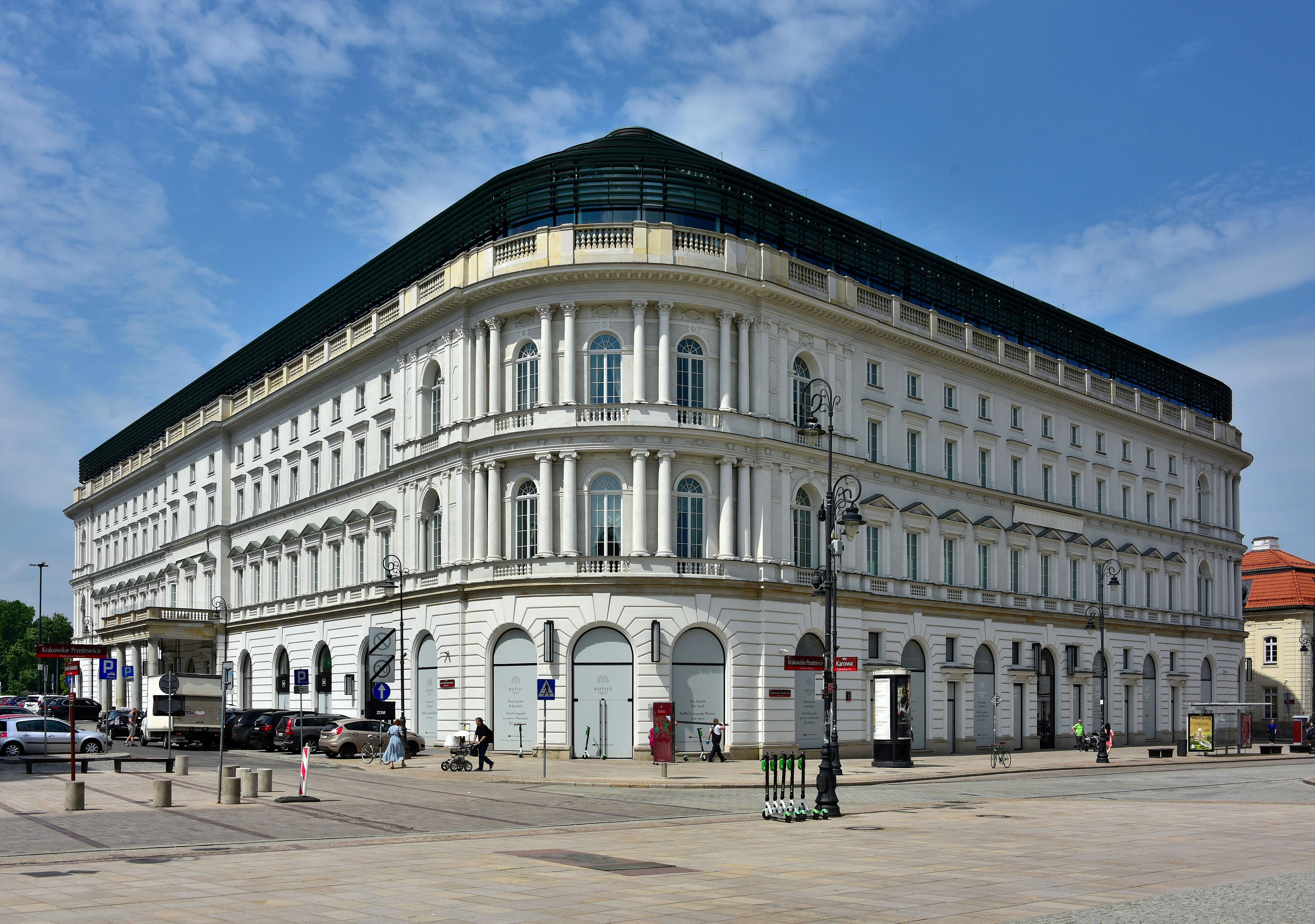
The hotel after renovation in 2019

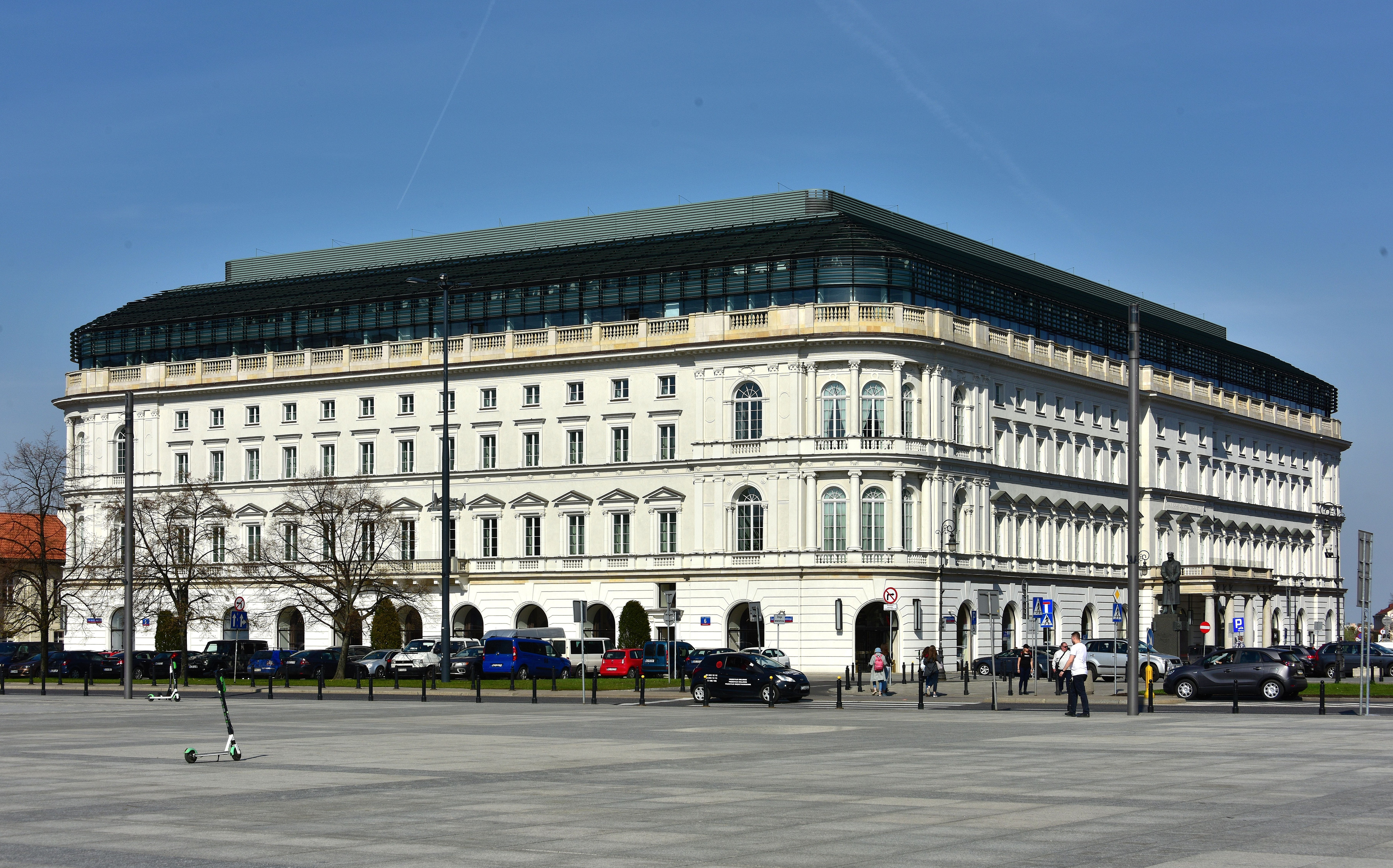
Hotel Europejski seen from the Piłsudski Square

== See also ==
- Architecture of Warsaw
- Architecture of Poland
- Hotel Bristol, Warsaw
- Luxury hotel
