= Raffles Istanbul =

Hotel in Istanbul, Turkey

- Location within Istanbul

General information
- Location: Zorlu Center, Istanbul
- Coordinates: 41°4′4.7352″N 29°0′55.0794″E
- Opening: 2014-09-01
- Operator: Raffles Hotels & Resorts

Height
- Height: 134 metres (440 ft)

Technical details
- Floor count: 27

Design and construction
- Architects: Emre Arolat & Tabanlıoğlu Architecture

Other information
- Number of rooms: 136
- Number of suites: 49
- Number of restaurants: 3

Website
- www.raffles.com

Raffles Istanbul is a 5-star hotel in Istanbul that is managed by Raffles Hotels & Resorts. The hotel opened on September 1, 2014. Designed by Emre Arolat & Tabanlıoğlu Architecture, the hotel has a height of 134 metres (440 ft), making it one of Istanbul's most noticeable buildings.

== History ==
In 2007, the Zorlu Center project started with the purchase of the property. After several years of construction, Raffles Istanbul was opened on September 1, 2014. The hotel is part of the Zorlu Center which consists of residences, offices, a shopping mall, and a performing arts center. The hotel itself hosts an art collection of around 200 pieces from both international and local artists. The hotel also includes a ballroom with a capacity of 1,200 people and is directly linked to the Performing Arts Center.

== Restaurants ==
Raffles Istanbul has 8 food and beverage outlets.

== Recreational facilities ==
Raffles Istanbul has an array of recreational facilities:

- One of Istanbul's largest spas which is 3000 square metres
- 3 Turkish hammams
- Indoor & Outdoor pool

== See also ==
- Hotels in Istanbul
