= Raffles Praslin, Seychelles =

Luxury resort in Seychelles

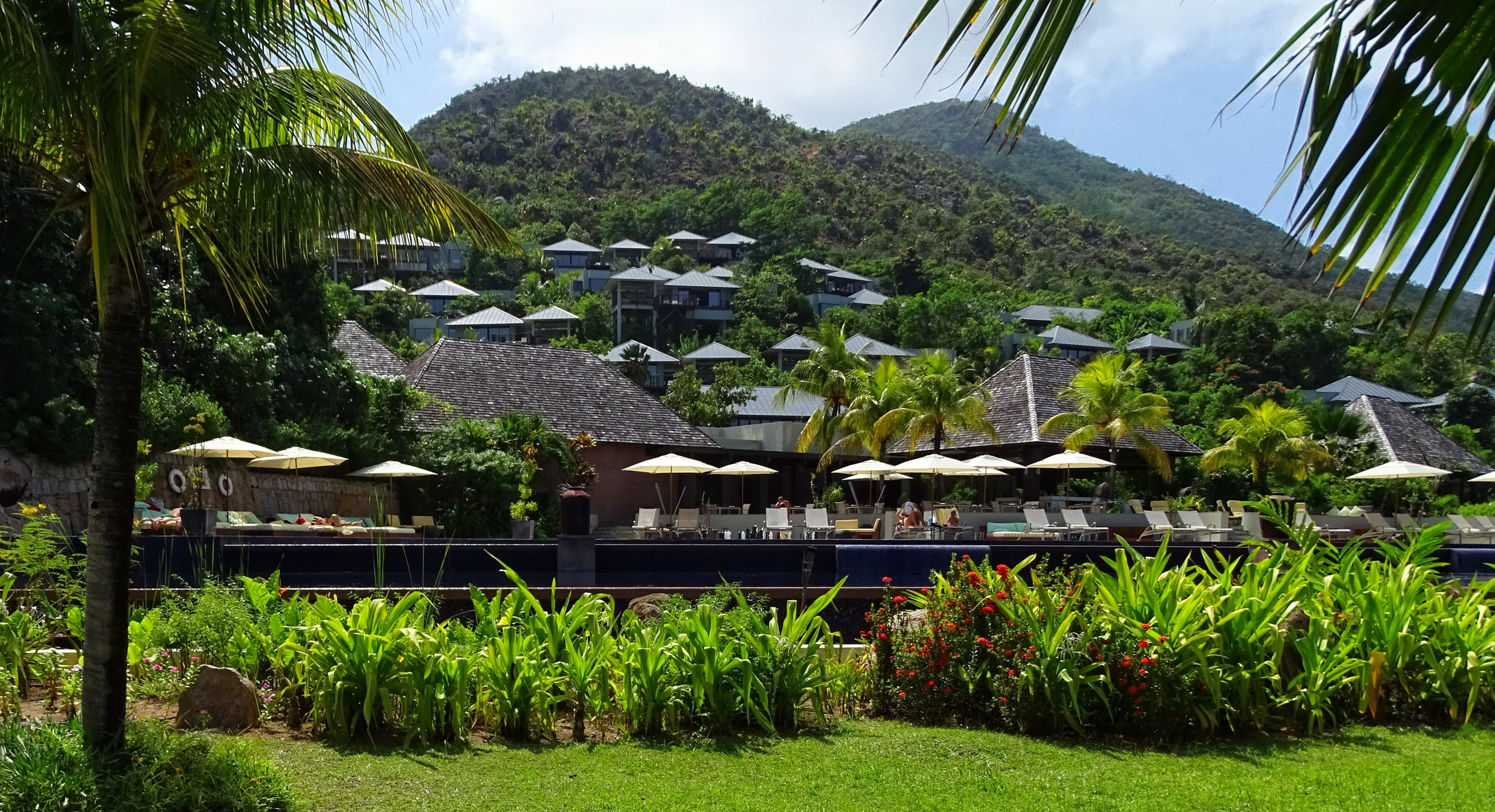
- From the main pool up towards the villas
- Hotel chain: Raffles Hotels & Resorts

General information
- Location: Praslin, Seychelles
- Opening: February 2011

Design and construction
- Architects: Ross Macbeth, Architect for Macbeth Architects + Designers

Other information
- Number of rooms: 86

Raffles Praslin, Seychelles is an 86-villa luxury resort on the island of Praslin in Seychelles. The hotel is managed by Raffles Hotels & Resorts, which is under the Fairmont Hotels and Resorts umbrella. Raffles Praslin was the first Raffles resort to be built and is home to the original Raffles Signature Spa. The complex operates six restaurants.

== History ==
Raffles Praslin opened in February 2011 and was designed by Ross Macbeth from Macbeth Architects & Designers. Macbeth was awarded the Young Architect of the Year award for his work here. The interior of the property was designed by Wilson & Associates. The hotel is partially owned by Kingdom Holding Company, a hotel investment firm.

== Facilities ==
Raffles Praslin, Seychelles is home to the Raffles Spa. It is the largest spa in Seychelles with 1,234 square meters of space, including 13 treatment pavilions. The hotel also features the largest swimming pool in the Indian Ocean with a length of 45 meters. The hotel is located on the Anse Takamaka Beach that spans 500 meters of beachfront.

== Location ==
Raffles Praslin, Seychelles is located on the north-eastern top of Praslin Island, the second largest granite island of Seychelles.
