= Raffles Makkah Palace =

Building in Mecca, Saudi Arabia

Coordinates: 21.389082°N 39.857912°E

- Interactive map of the Raffles Makkah Palace area

General information
- Location: Mecca, Saudi Arabia, King Abdul Aziz Endowment Mecca, Saudi Arabia
- Opening: August 12, 2010
- Owner: Raffles Hotels & Resorts

Height
- Height: 58 m (190 ft)

Technical details
- Floor count: 18

Design and construction
- Architect: Areen Hospitality

Other information
- Number of rooms: 209

Website
- Raffles Makkah

Raffles Makkah Palace is a hotel located in Mecca, Saudi Arabia. The 18-story hotel is a 5-star luxury hotel operated by Raffles Hotels & Resorts, which is under the Fairmont Hotels and Resorts corporate umbrella. The property is located directly adjacent to Masjid al-Haram, the Grand Mosque.

== History ==
Construction on the hotel began in 2009 and was officially opened on August 12, 2010 . The exterior and interior of the hotel were designed and constructed by Areen Hospitality, a London based firm. The design goal was to incorporate touches of local Saudi Arabian architecture and culture.

While Raffles Makkah Palace is managed by Fairmont hotels & Resort, Kingdom Hotels International and Colony Capital LLC both remain key shareholders in the property. The hotel is also a part of the Kind Abdul Aziz Endowment, which has the goal to modernize the city in catering to the Hajj pilgrims. The property is located close to various tourist attractions such as Masjid Al-Haram, Kaaba, Jabal Al Nour (Mountain of Light), Al Jamarat, Jabal Thawr, and Abraj Al Bait Shopping Mall.

== Awards and accolades ==
Raffles Makkah Palace has won a variety of luxury hospitality awards including:

- Raffles Makkah Palace Honorable Mention – The Middle East Interior Design Competition (2013)
- 2013 Middle East’s Leading Luxury Hotel (World Travel Awards)
- 2012 Middle East’s Leading Luxury Hotel (World Travel Awards)
- 2011 World’s Leading Luxury All Suite Hotel (World Travel Awards)
- 2011 Middle East’s Leading Luxury Hotel (World Travel Awards)
