= Ruffle =

Ruffle or ruffles may refer to:

- Ruffle (sewing), a gathered or pleated strip of fabric
- Ruffle (software), a Flash Player emulator written in the Rust programming language
- Ruffles (potato chips), a brand of potato chips
- Ruffles and flourishes, a fanfare for ceremonial music played on drums and bugles
- Ruffle Bar, an island in the US state of New York
- Raspberry Ruffle, a UK chocolate bar manufactured by Tangerine Confectionery
- Dust ruffle, a piece of decorative fabric used in bedding
- Jonathan Ruffle, a British writer

== See also ==
- Ruff (disambiguation)
