= Hotel Le Royal =

Hotel in Phnom Penh, Cambodia

Coordinates: 11.576271°N 104.918248°E

- Interactive map of the Hotel Le Royal area
- Former names: Hotel Le Phnom (1970-75), Hotel Samakki (1979-1993)

General information
- Type: Hotel
- Location: 92 Rukhak Vithei, Daun Penh District, Phnom Penh, Cambodia
- Completed: 1929
- Owner: Raffles Hotels & Resorts

Design and construction
- Architects: Ernest Hébrard, Jean Desbois

The Raffles Hotel Le Royal is a hotel located in Daun Penh District, Phnom Penh, Cambodia. Established in 1929, it is currently operated by Raffles Hotels & Resorts.

== History ==
In late 1923 and early 1924, the construction of a 55-room hotel in Phnom Penh was proposed, with Ernest Hébrard as architect and the help of Jean Desbois for the design. A visionary planner, he played no small part in turning a Cambodian-French colonial outpost into a bustling and dynamic metropolis.

The Phnom Penh proposal also outlined the construction of 40-room hotels elsewhere in French Indo-China, including Siem Reap (due to the tourist potential of the Angkor ruins) and Hué (today in Vietnam). Included in the initial proposal were preliminary estimates for buildings and furnishings for five sites. Costs were presented in the currency of Indochina at the time, the ‘piastre’ or Indochina dollar. It is evident that the highest priority was given to the future hotel for Phnom Penh.

An integral part of Hébrard’s plan was to partially fill in a canal that encircled Phnom Penh’s European Quarter, plant extensive gardens, extend the city to the other side of the Tonle Sap River, create a new central market and, construct a new hotel to be managed by the Society for Grand Hotels of Indochina.

The grand opening of the Hotel Le Royal, on the evening of 20 November 1929, was attended by King Sisowath Monivong and a host of expatriate guests. The party included a lavish buffet, dancing and performances by an orchestra brought especially from Saigon. The Director of the hotel between 1929 and 1931 was M.L.F. de la Pousardière. On 22 December 1931, L’Echo du Cambodge announced the departure of M La Pousardière and his replacement by M. Jean Baluteig.

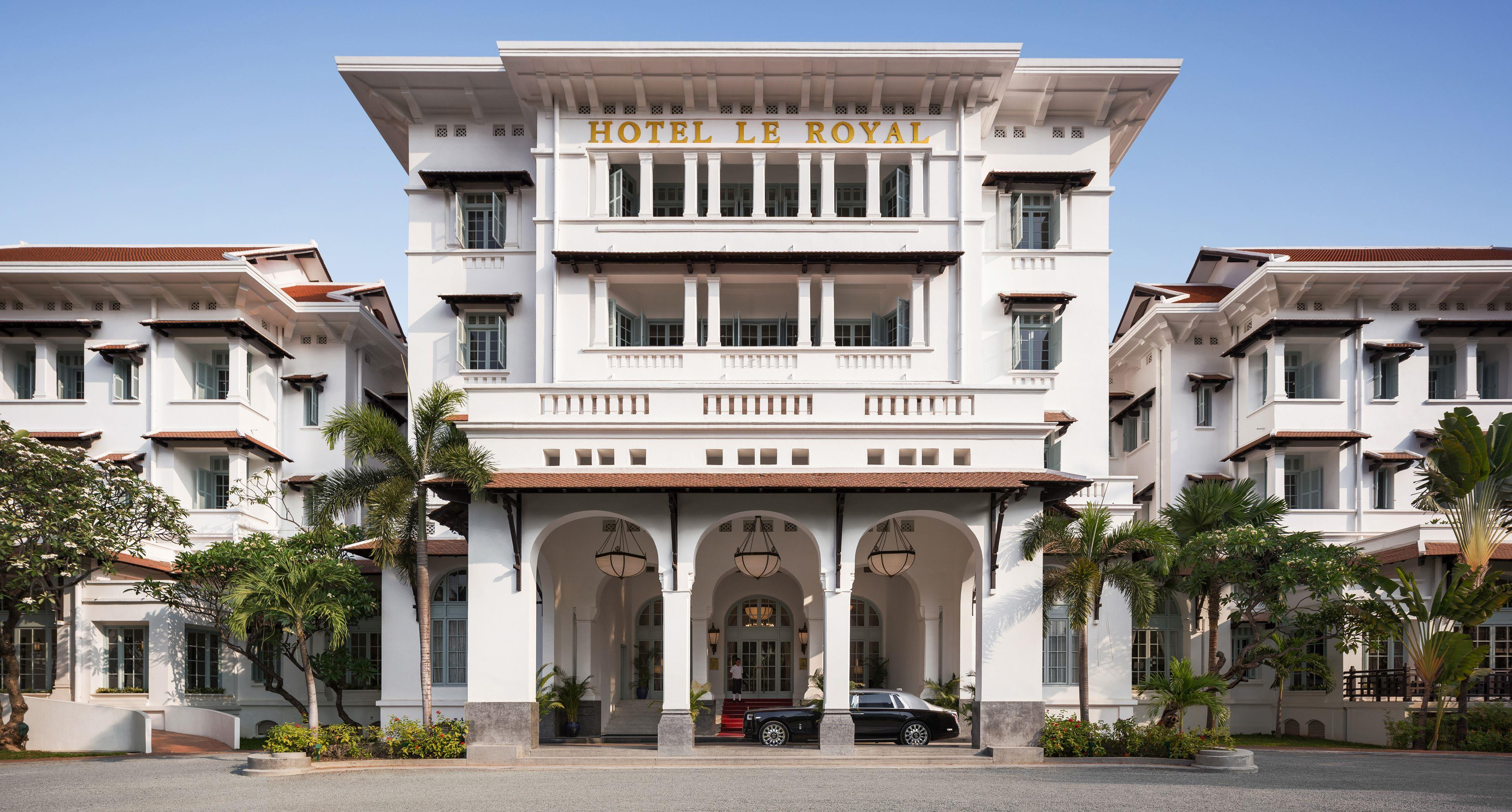
Front of the Hotel Le Royal

From 1970 to 1975, during the Khmer Republic, the hotel was renamed Hotel Le Phnom, and was a popular refuge for journalists covering the Cambodian Civil War. In April 1975, the Red Cross sought to establish the hotel as a neutral zone. However, with the Fall of Phnom Penh on 17 April 1975, the Khmer Rouge emptied the hotel and its grounds. After the fall of the Khmer Rouge in 1979, it was reopened as Hotel Samakki (Solidarity Hotel). When King Norodom Sihanouk was reinstalled in 1993, the hotel reverted once again to Hotel Le Royal. It was fully restored and reopened as Raffles Hotel Le Royal in 1997. The hotel was sold, with its sister property in Siem Reap, to Singapore-based Lodgis Hospitality Holdings in 2018.

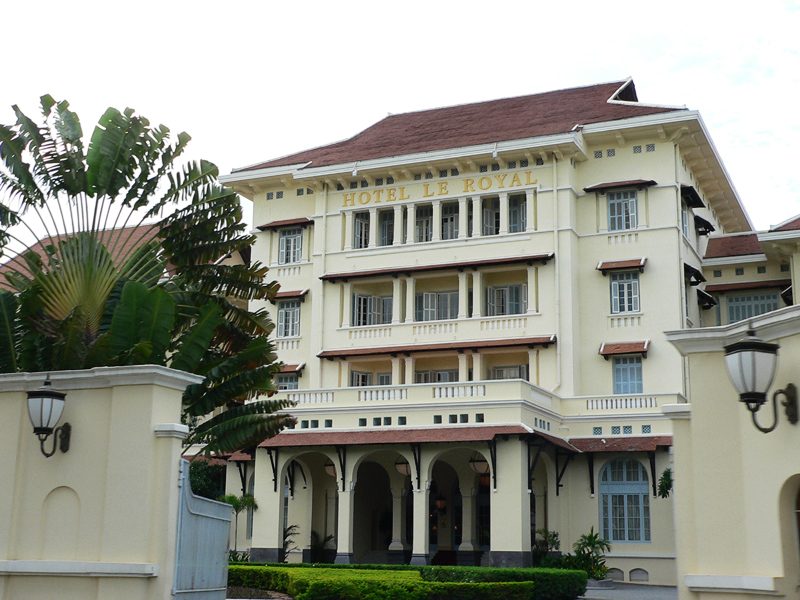
Front of the Hotel Le Royal

== Location ==
The street on the west side of the hotel, Monivong Boulevard, is named for King Monivong. The street in front of the hotel has changed names several times. Originally Avenue du Maréchal Joffre, it later became Pologne Street and is now known as Rukhak Vithei Daun Penh.

== Literature ==
William Warren, Jill Gocher (2007). Asia's legendary hotels: the romance of travel. Singapore: Periplus Editions. ISBN 978-0-7946-0174-4.
