= Hotel =

Establishment that provides lodging paid on a short-term basis

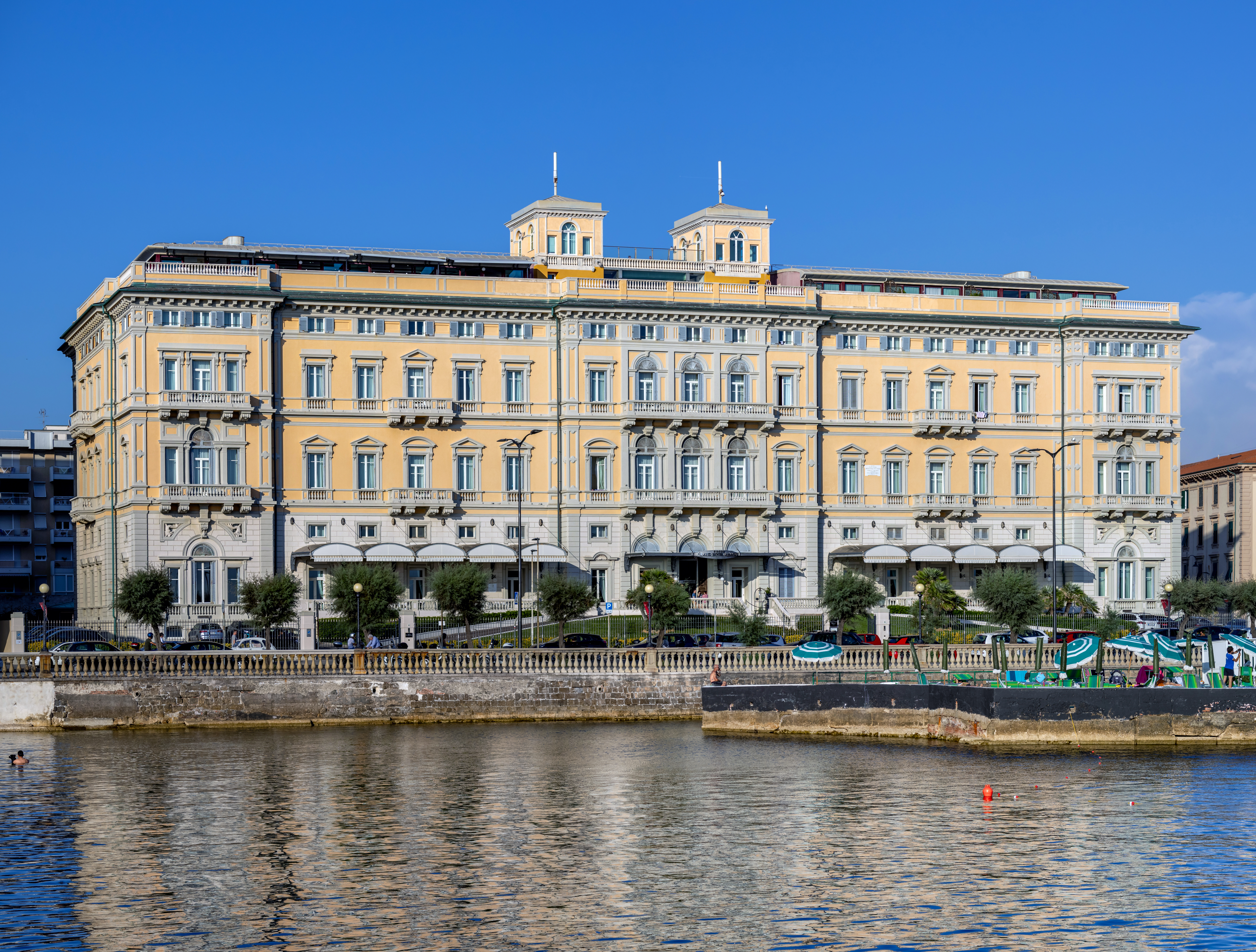
Grand Hotel Palazzo on the Ligurian Sea in Livorno, Italy

A hotel is an establishment that provides paid lodging on a short-term basis. Facilities provided inside a hotel room may range from a modest-quality mattress in a small room to large suites with bigger, higher-quality beds, a dresser, a refrigerator, and other kitchen facilities, upholstered chairs, a television, and en-suite bathrooms. Small, lower-priced hotels may offer only the most basic guest services and facilities. Larger, higher-priced hotels may provide additional guest facilities such as a swimming pool, a business center with computers, printers, and other office equipment, childcare, conference and event facilities, tennis or basketball courts, gymnasium, restaurants, day spa, and social function services. Hotel rooms are usually numbered (or named in some smaller hotels and B&Bs) to allow guests to identify their room. Some boutique, high-end hotels have custom decorated rooms. Some hotels offer meals as part of a room and board arrangement.

Hotel operations vary in size, function, complexity, and cost. Most hotels and major hospitality companies have set industry standards to classify hotel types. An upscale full-service hotel facility offers luxury amenities, full-service accommodations, an on-site restaurant, and the highest level of personalized service, such as a concierge, room service, and clothes-ironing staff. Full-service hotels often contain upscale full-service facilities with many full-service accommodations, an on-site full-service restaurant, and a variety of on-site amenities. Boutique hotels are smaller independent, non-branded hotels that often contain upscale facilities. Small to medium-sized hotel establishments offer a limited amount of on-site amenities. Economy hotels are small to medium-sized hotel establishments that offer basic accommodations with little to no services. Extended stay hotels are small to medium-sized hotels that offer longer-term full-service accommodations compared to a traditional hotel.

The precursor to the modern hotel was the inn of medieval Europe. For a period of about 200 years from the mid-17th century, coaching inns served as a place for lodging for coach travelers. Inns began to cater to wealthier clients in the mid-18th century. One of the first hotels in a modern sense was opened in Exeter in 1768. Hotels proliferated throughout Western Europe and North America in the early 19th century, and luxury hotels began to spring up in the later part of the 19th century, particularly in the United States.

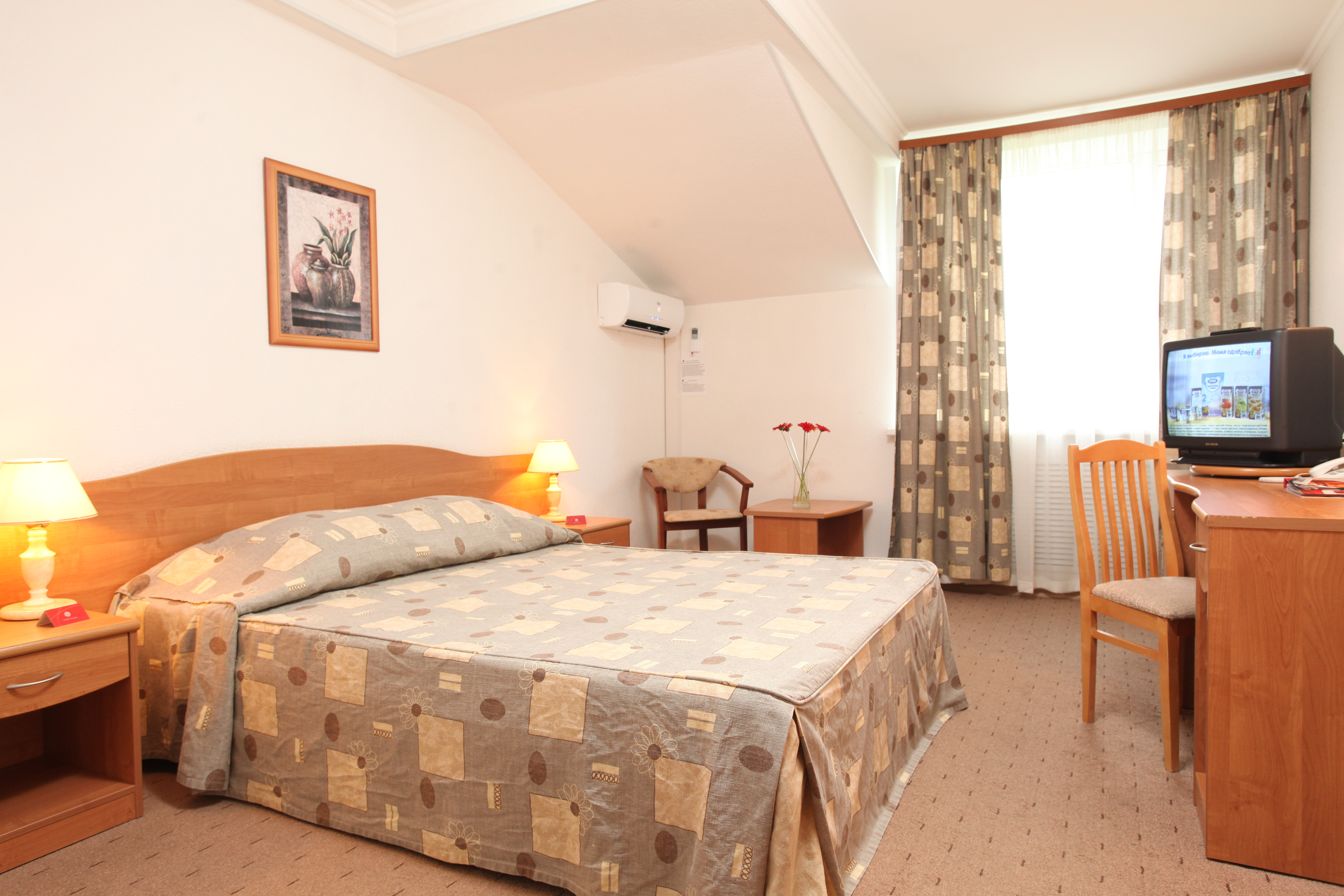
A room in a mid-market Russian chain hotel, with a bed, desk, and television.

Most hotel establishments are run by a general manager who serves as the head executive (often referred to as the "hotel manager"), department heads who oversee various departments within a hotel (e.g., food service), middle managers, administrative staff, and line-level supervisors. The organizational chart and volume of job positions and hierarchy varies by hotel size, function and class, and is often determined by hotel ownership and managing companies.

== Etymology ==
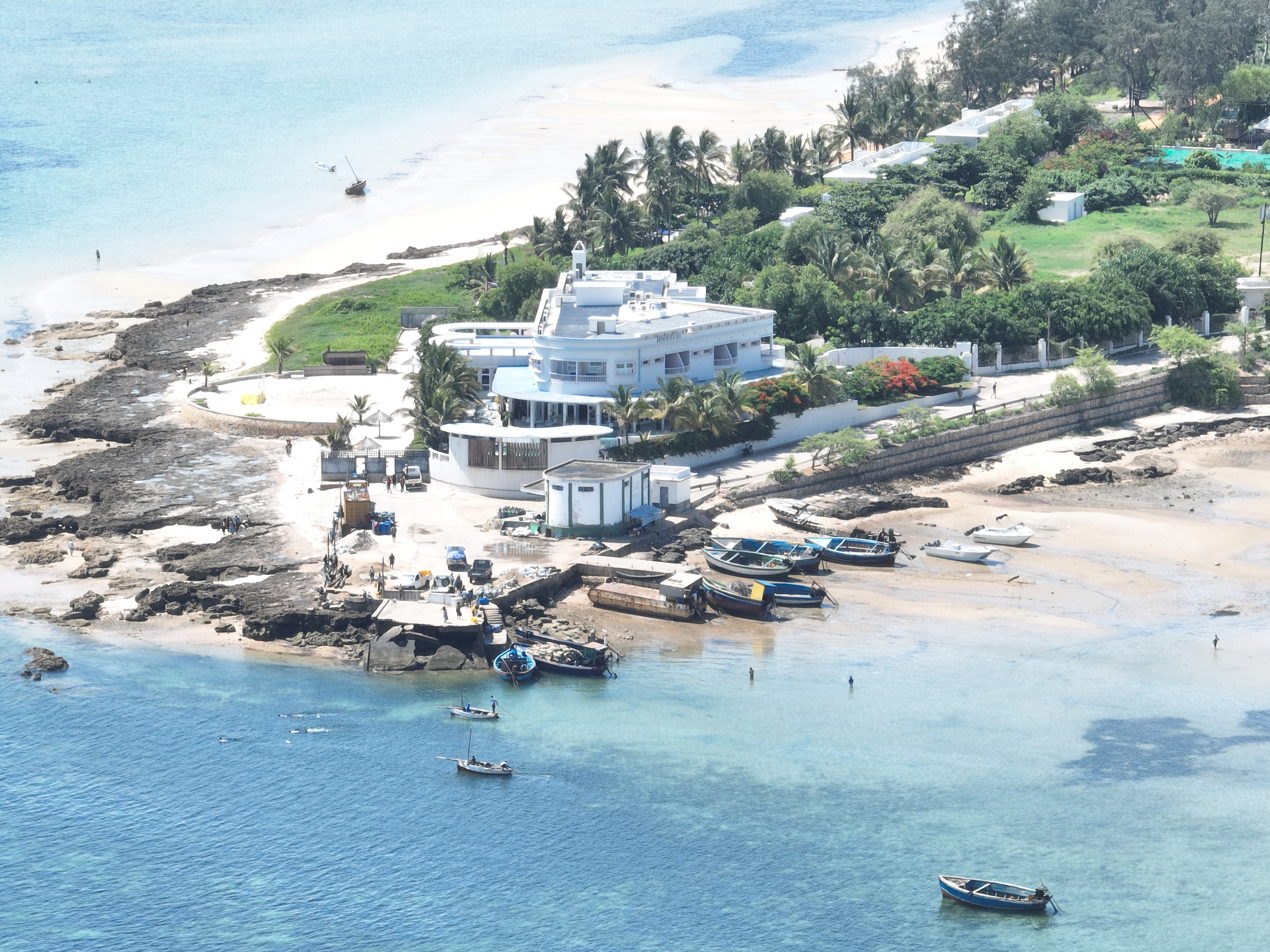
Aerial view of a coastal hotel complex in Vilankulo, Mozambique

The word hotel is derived from the French hôtel (coming from the same origin as hospital), which referred to a French version of a building seeing frequent visitors, and providing care, rather than a place offering accommodation. In contemporary French usage, hôtel now has the same meaning as the English term, and hôtel particulier is used for the old meaning, as well as hôtel in some place names such as Hôtel-Dieu (in Paris), which has been a hospital since the Middle Ages. The French spelling, with the circumflex, was also used in English, but is now rare. The circumflex replaces the 's' found in the earlier hostel spelling, which over time took on a new, but closely related meaning.

Grammatically, hotels usually take the definite article – hence "The Astoria Hotel" or simply "The Astoria".

== History ==
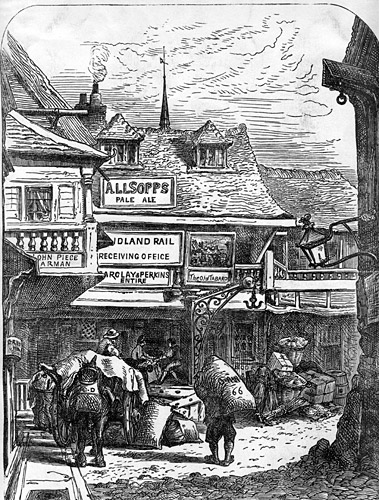
The Tabard Inn, Southwark, London

Facilities offering hospitality to travellers featured in early civilizations. In Greco-Roman culture and in ancient Persia, hospitals for recuperation and rest were built at thermal baths. Guinness World Records officially recognised Japan's Nishiyama Onsen Keiunkan, founded in 705, as the oldest hotel in the world. During the Middle Ages, various religious orders at monasteries and abbeys would offer accommodation for travellers on the road.

The precursor to the modern hotel was the inn of medieval Europe, possibly dating back to the rule of Ancient Rome. These would provide for the needs of travellers, including food and lodging, stabling and fodder for the traveller's horses and fresh horses for mail coaches. Famous London examples of inns include the George and the Tabard. A typical layout of an inn featured an inner court with bedrooms on the two sides, with the kitchen and parlour at the front and the stables at the back.

For a period of about 200 years from the mid-17th century, coaching inns served as a place for lodging for coach travellers (in other words, a roadhouse). Coaching inns stabled teams of horses for stagecoaches and mail coaches and replaced tired teams with fresh teams. Traditionally they were seven miles apart, but this depended very much on the terrain.

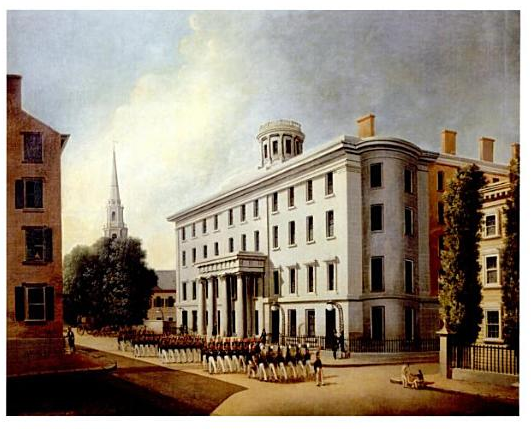
Tremont House in Boston, United States, a luxury hotel, the first to provide indoor plumbing

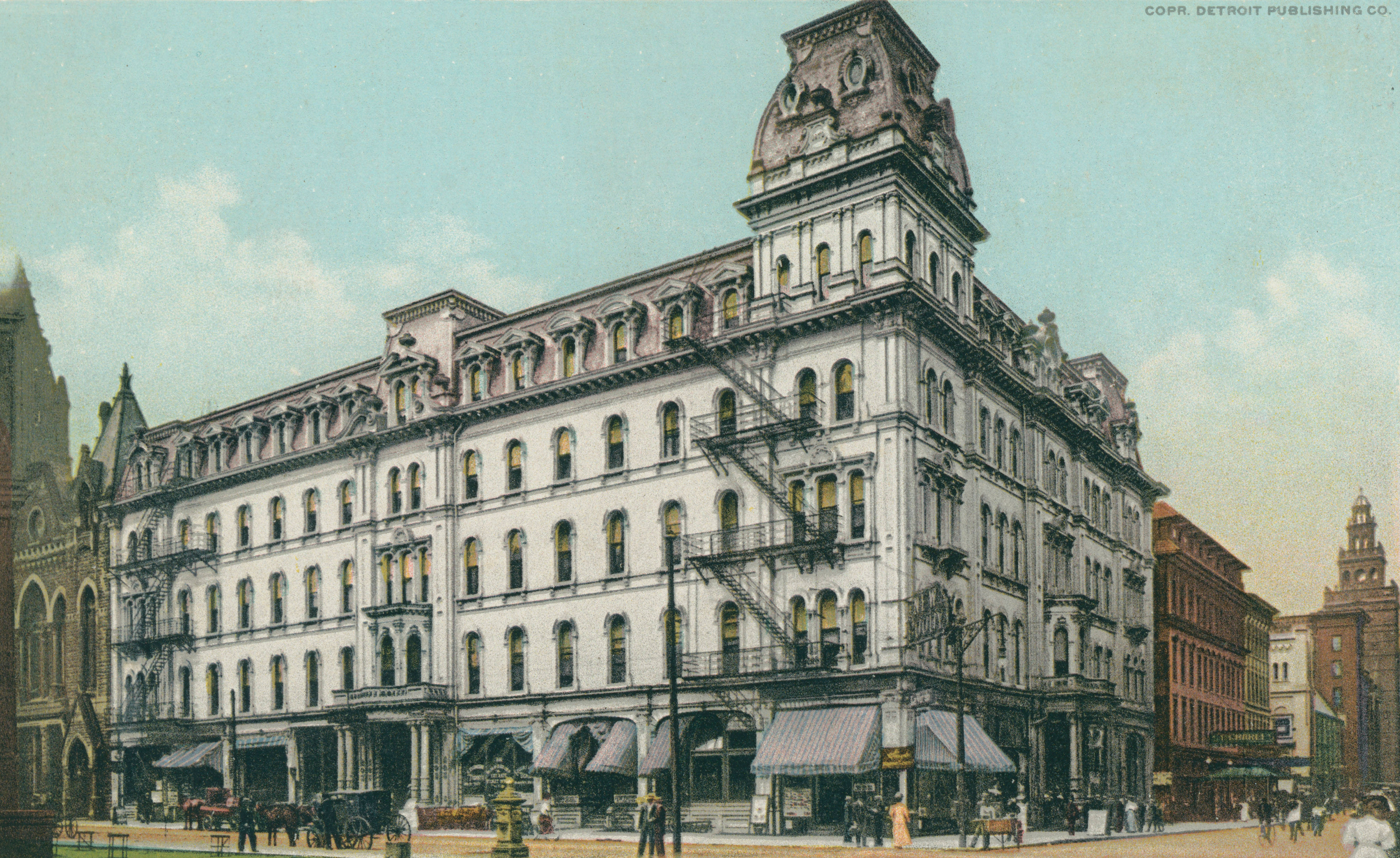
The Boody House Hotel in Toledo, Ohio

Some English towns had as many as ten such inns and rivalry between them became intense, not only for the income from the stagecoach operators but for the revenue from the food and drink supplied to the wealthy passengers. By the end of the century, coaching inns were being run more professionally, with a regular timetable being followed and fixed menus for food.

Inns began to cater to richer clients in the mid-18th century, and consequently grew in grandeur and in the level of service provided. Sudhir Andrews traces "the birth of an organised hotel industry" to Europe's chalets and small hotels which catered primarily to aristocrats. One of the first hotels in a modern sense, the Royal Clarence, opened in Exeter in 1768, although the idea only really caught on in the early-19th century. In 1812 Mivart's Hotel opened its doors in London, later changing its name to Claridge's.

Hotels proliferated throughout Western Europe and North America in the 19th century. Luxury hotels, including the 1829 Tremont House in Boston, the 1836 Astor House in New York City, the 1889 Savoy Hotel in London, and the Ritz chain of hotels in London and Paris in the late 1890s, catered to an ever more-wealthy clientele.

The luxury hotels of the 1900's were referred to as palace hotels in the United States, and as grand hotels in Europe. While there were differences between these two types of hotels -- a palace hotel was always large, while a grand hotel could have as few as 50 guest rooms -- they both featured dining, facilities for social activities, and a high standard of personalized service in addition to rooms for sleeping. Many were located downtown in cities, and this type of hotel spread globally to provide European and American travelers with familiar accommodations. Luxury hotels of this period frequently offered long-term accommodations in addition to short-term stays.

In the United States, the majority of hotels in the 19th through the mid-20th centuries contained both rooms intended for short-term stays and rooms or suites intended for more permanent residence. People of all social classes lived in hotels during this time period.

Title II of the Civil Rights Act of 1964 is part of a United States law that prohibits discrimination on the basis of race, religion, or national origin in places of public accommodation. Hotels are included as types of public accommodation in the Act.

== International scale ==
Hotels cater to travelers from many countries and languages, since no one country dominates the travel industry.

Country	Hotel rooms in 2011–12	Average rooms per hotel	Overnight tourists traveling from each country, annual
United States	4,900,000	93	58,000,000
China	1,500,000	132	83,000,000
Japan	1,370,000	27	18,000,000
Italy	1,100,000	32	29,000,000
Germany	950,000	27	72,000,000
Spain	900,000	47	12,000,000
Mexico	660,000	37	16,000,000
United Kingdom	650,000	17	57,000,000
France	620,000	36	26,000,000
Thailand	530,000	NA	6,000,000
Indonesia	410,000	25	7,000,000
Greece	400,000	41	5,000,000
Brazil	400,000	40	8,000,000
Turkey	330,000	117	16,000,000
Austria	290,000	22	11,000,000
Russia	260,000	33	44,000,000
Global total	21,000,000	41	876,000,000

== Facilities ==
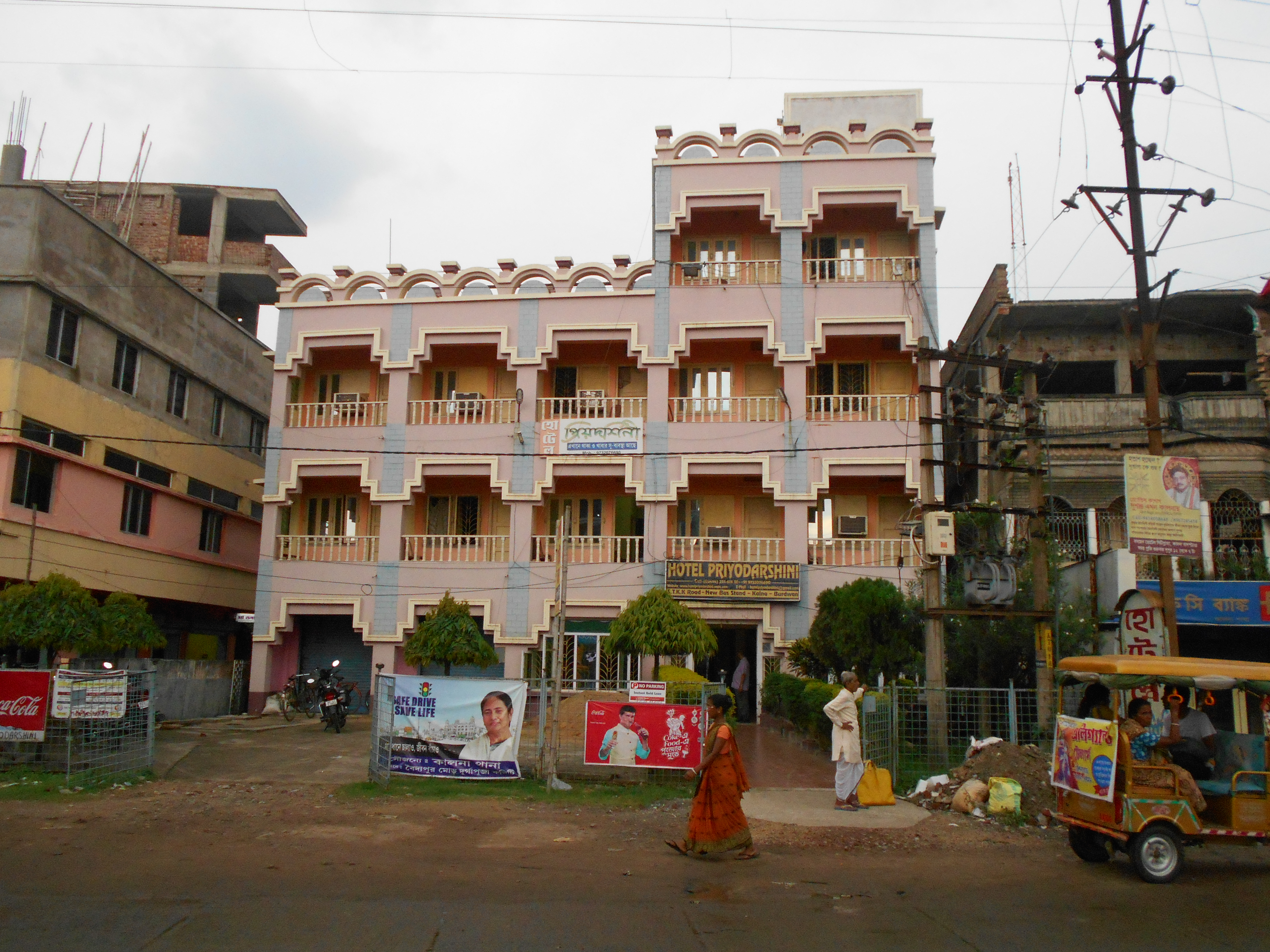
A hotel in Kalna, West Bengal, India

Across different price categories, locations, and purposes, the facilities of hotels vary considerably. The facilities of a hotel can be divided into those located inside the guest room, and those located outside of the guest room.

=== Guest rooms ===
All hotels feature a private room for the guest (or group of guests staying together), and offer a sleeping accommodation. In Western-style hotels, there will be a bed in the room, but hotels such as the Japanese ryokan and some Korean ondol rooms feature futons or mats which can be moved out of the way during the daytime. Most hotel rooms have locking doors for privacy, and guests typically receive either a physical key or an electronic key for their room. In some hotels, several rooms will share a single bathroom, whereas many hotel rooms feature a private bathroom.

Hotels typically provide bedding and towels, which are washed between guests, and are replaced periodically during a customer's stay at the hotel, either automatically or on request. The hotel staff also usually performs daily cleaning of the guest room. Some hotels offer an additional daily service in the room, known as turndown service, which occurs before bedtime.

Many additional hotel amenities are frequently found in guest rooms, such as television sets, hair dryers, desks, chairs, Wi-Fi, and complimentary personal care products.

=== Additional facilities ===
Hotel facilities outside of the guest room often include a reception desk, where hotel guests may check in and check out for their stay at the hotel, as well as ask questions and request additional services. Many hotels also feature restaurants and bars, and it may be possible to obtain food via room service.

Fitness and wellness offerings frequently include swimming pools and fitness rooms. Saunas, spas, and other facilities are also offered at some hotels.

Hotels designed to host events, such as conferences and meetings, will typically have meeting rooms of various sizes, ranging from those suitable for small groups to large banquet halls or exhibit halls.

== Types ==
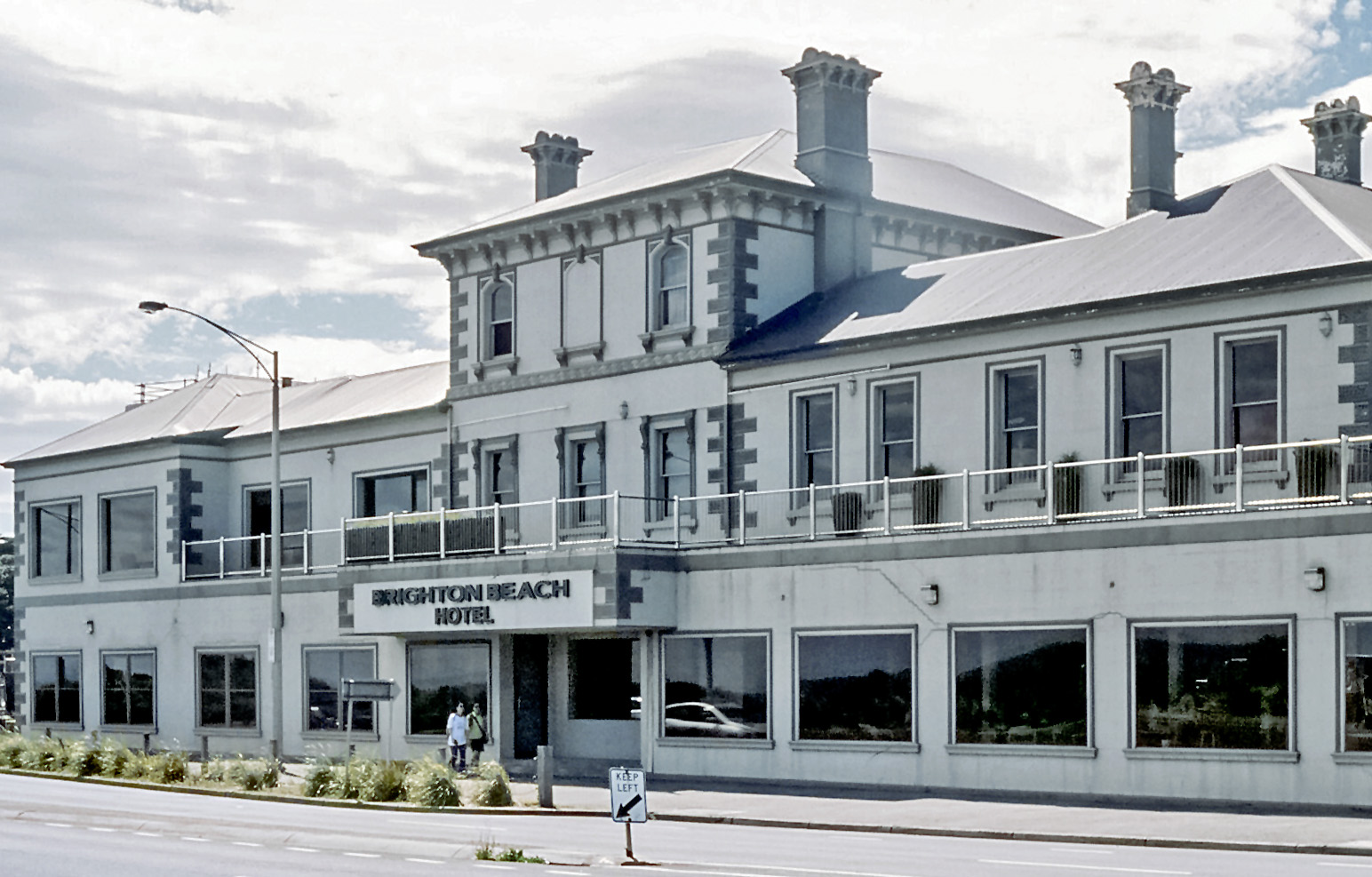
Hotel at Brighton beach in Victoria Australia

Hotels are classified in a number of different ways, based on criteria such as their quality, size, location, and type of customer.

Hotel rating systems are focused on quality, which includes criteria such as the amenities offered by the hotel and the level of service available. For example, a hotel with a higher rating may be expected to offer a spa, while a hotel with a lower rating may be expected to have a television in every guest room. There is no global standard for hotel ratings, meaning that amenities at a given rating level will vary from one market to another.

The types of customers served by a hotel is distinguished in part by the purpose of travel. Business, conference, and leisure travel (such as tourism) are common reasons people travel. Many hotels cater to more than one type of traveler, for example hosting business travelers during the week and leisure travelers on the weekend. Hotel facilities and services vary depending on the types of customers the hotel aims to serve.

Most hotels and major hospitality companies that operate hotels have set widely accepted industry standards to classify hotel types. General categories include the following:

=== International luxury ===
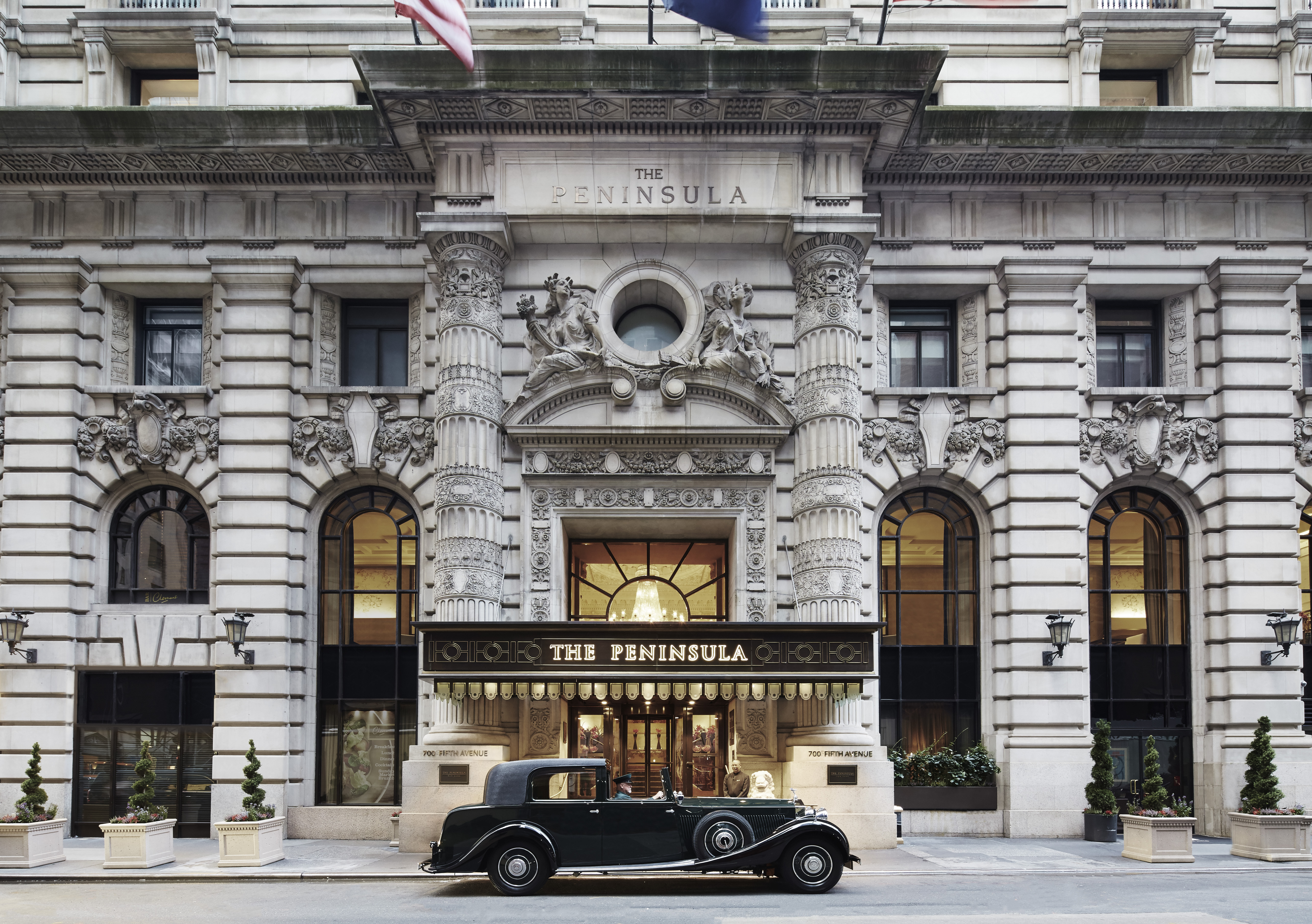
The Peninsula New York

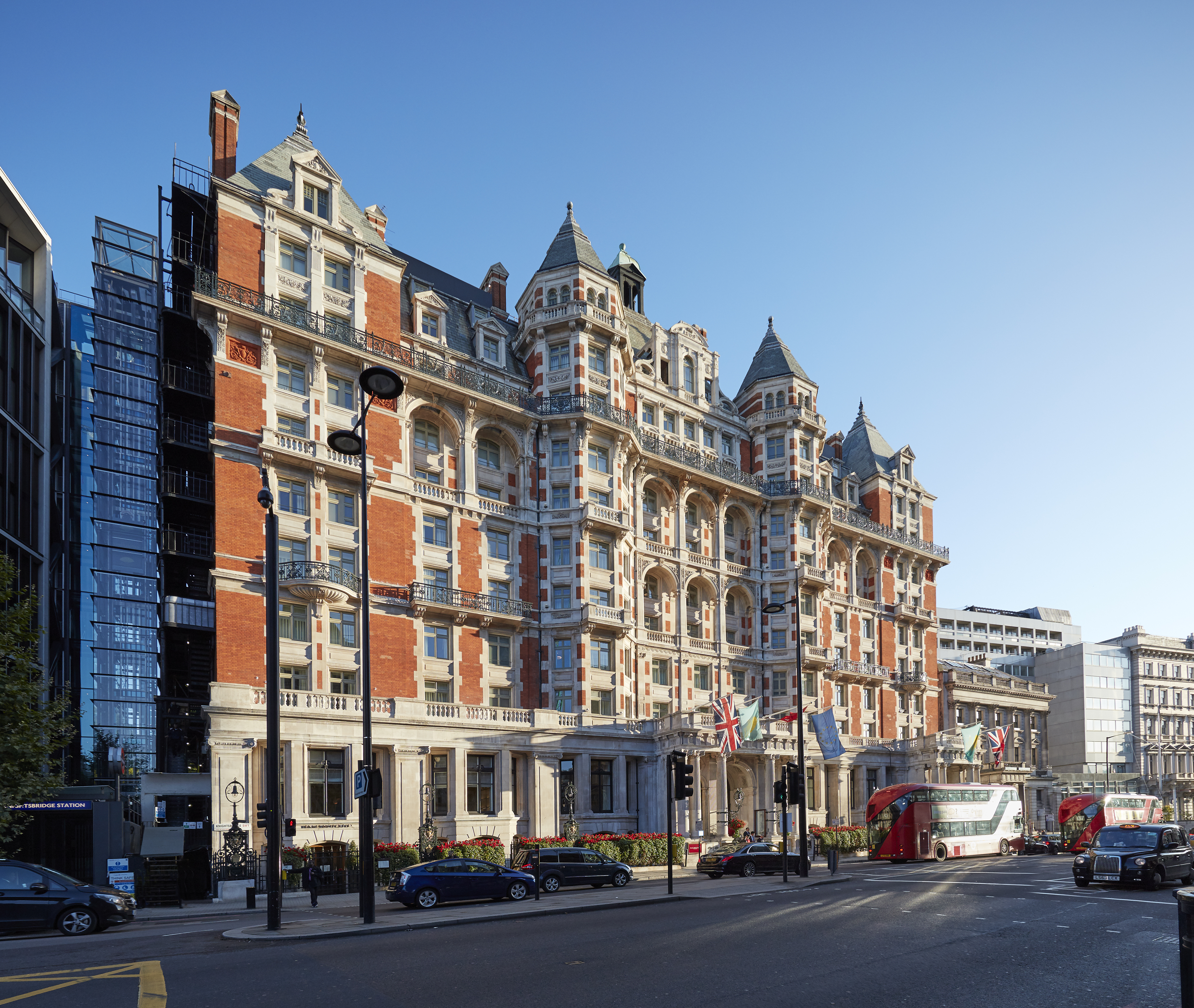
Mandarin Oriental Hyde Park, London

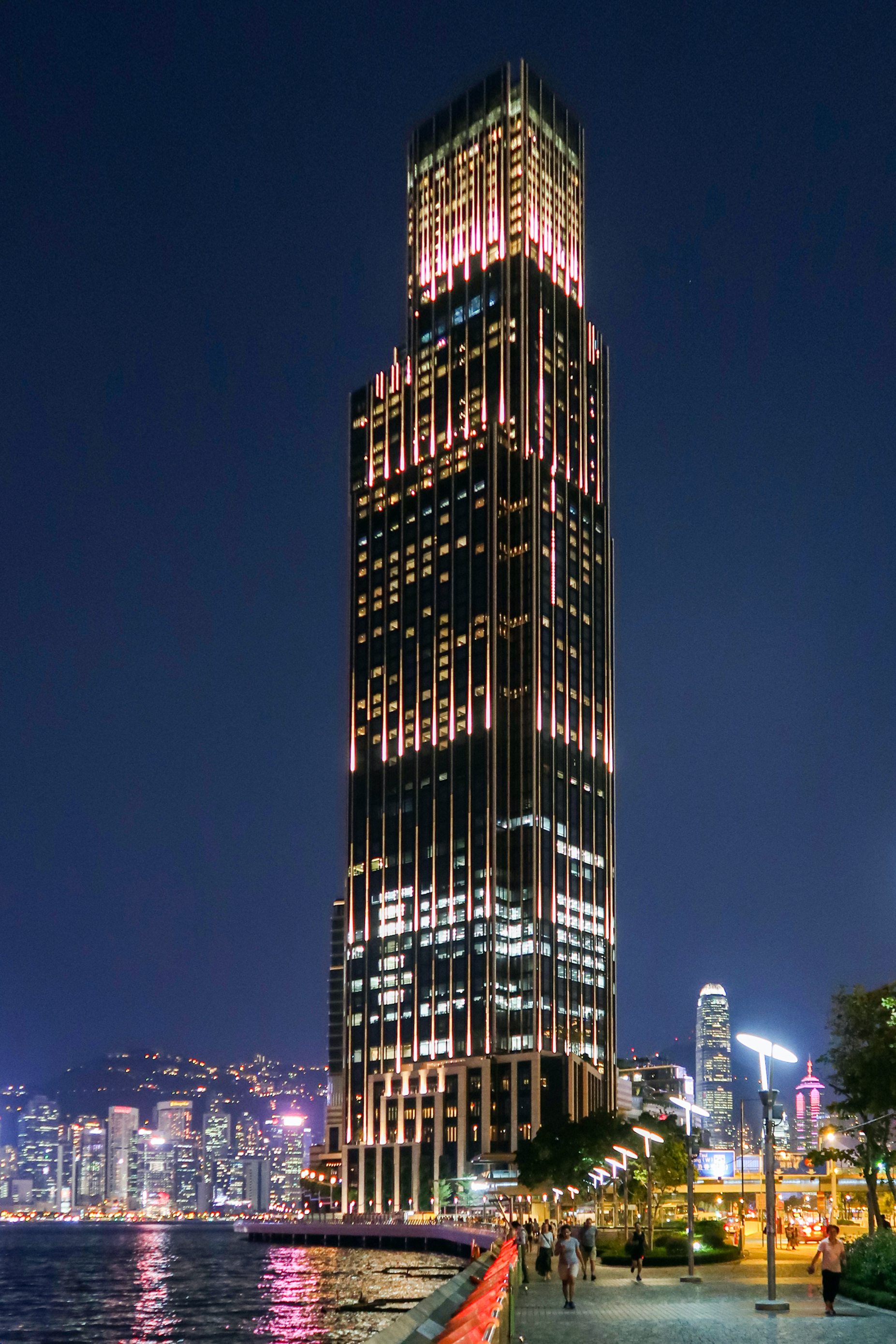
Rosewood Hong Kong

International luxury hotels offer high-quality amenities, full-service accommodations, on-site full-service restaurants, and the highest level of personalized and professional service in financial centres, metropolis or capital cities. International luxury hotels are classified with at least a Five Diamond rating or Five Star hotel rating depending on the country and local classification standards. Example brands include Grand Hyatt, Conrad, InterContinental, Sofitel, Mandarin Oriental, Four Seasons, The Peninsula, Rosewood, JW Marriott and The Ritz-Carlton.

=== Lifestyle luxury resorts ===
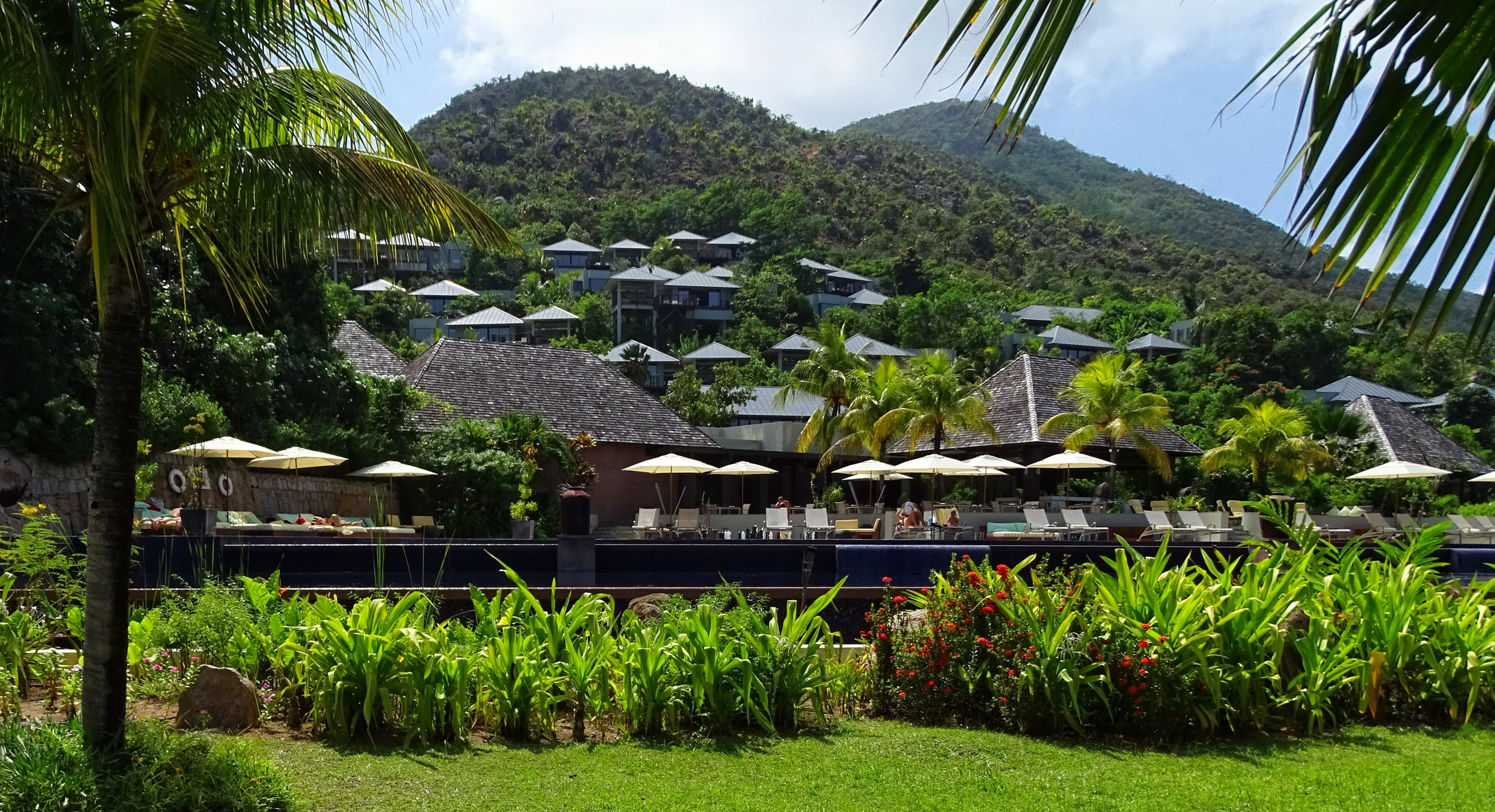
Raffles Praslin, Seychelles

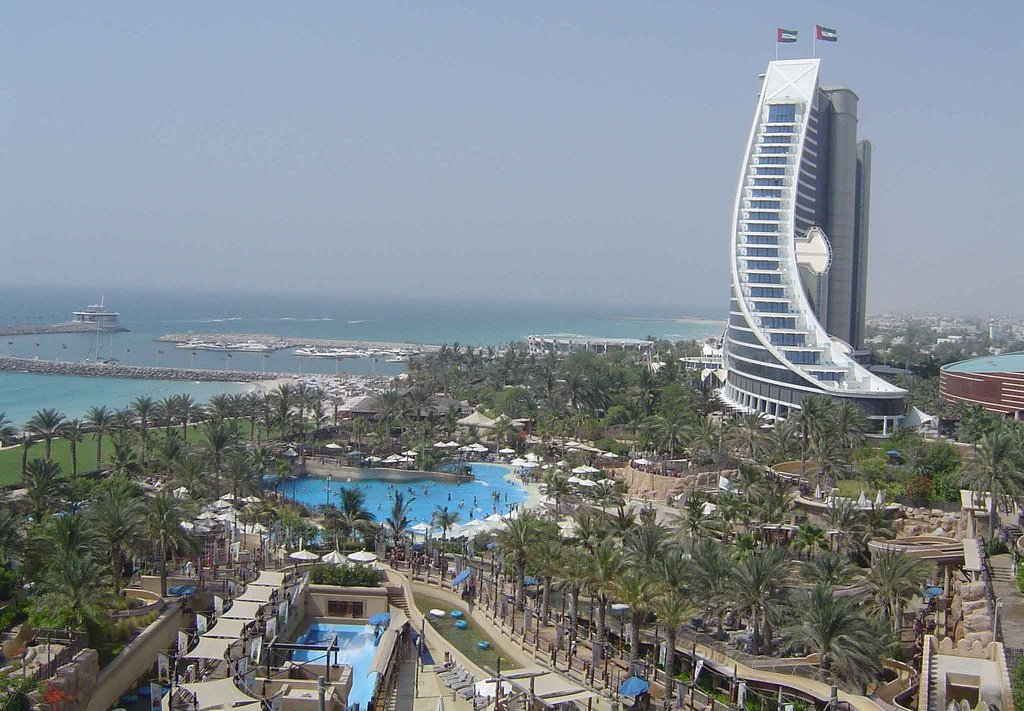
Jumeirah Beach Hotel in Dubai, United Arab Emirates

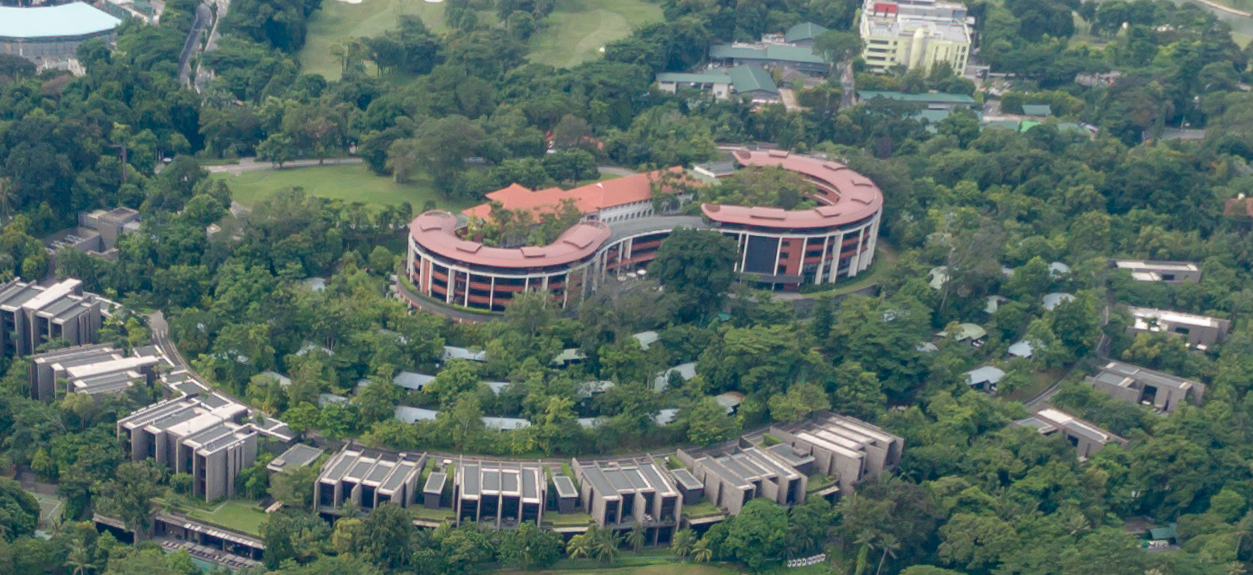
Capella Resort, Singapore

Lifestyle luxury resorts are branded hotels that appeal to a guest with lifestyle or personal image in specific locations. They are typically full-service and classified as luxury. A key characteristic of lifestyle resorts is focus on providing a unique guest experience as opposed to simply providing lodging. Lifestyle luxury resorts are classified with at least a Five Star hotel rating depending on the country and local classification standards. Example brands include Waldorf Astoria, St. Regis, Wynn Resorts, MGM, Shangri-La, Oberoi, Belmond, Jumeirah, Aman, Taj Hotels, Hoshino, Raffles, Capella, Fairmont, Banyan Tree, Regent and Park Hyatt.

=== Upscale full-service ===
Upscale full-service hotels often provide a wide array of guest services and on-site facilities. Commonly found amenities may include on-site food and beverage (room service and restaurants), meeting and conference services and facilities, fitness center, and business center. Upscale full-service hotels range in quality from upscale to luxury. This classification is based upon the quality of facilities and amenities offered by the hotel. Examples include W Hotels, Sheraton, Langham, Kempinski, Pullman, Kimpton Hotels, Hilton, Swissôtel, Lotte, Renaissance, Marriott and Hyatt Regency brands.

=== Boutique ===
Boutique hotels are smaller independent non-branded hotels that often contain mid-scale to upscale facilities of varying size in unique or intimate settings with full-service accommodations. These hotels are generally 100 rooms or fewer.

=== Focused or select service ===
Small to medium-sized hotel establishments that offer a limited number of on-site amenities that only cater and market to a specific demographic of travelers, such as the single business traveler. Particularly in Japan, hotel chains created business hotels to cater to salarymen for work-related travel. Similar to economy and limited service hotels in North America, Japanese business hotels provide small but efficient rooms at a reasonable price, without all the frills and facilities of international chain hotels. Business hotels typically do not have banquet halls, conference rooms, swimming pool nor exercise room, although they may have an onsite restaurant offering breakfast and late-night ramen, while some establishments come with an onsen.

Most focused or select service hotels may still offer full-service accommodations but may lack leisure amenities such as an on-site restaurant or a swimming pool. Examples include Hyatt Place, Holiday Inn, Courtyard by Marriott and Hilton Garden Inn.

=== Economy and limited service ===
Small to medium-sized hotel establishments that offer a very limited number of on-site amenities and often only offer basic accommodations with little to no services, catering to the budget-minded traveler seeking a "no frills" accommodation. Limited service hotels often lack an on-site restaurant but in return may offer a limited complimentary food and beverage amenity such as on-site continental breakfast service. Examples include Ibis Budget, Hampton by Hilton, Aloft, Holiday Inn Express, Fairfield by Mariott, and Four Points by Sheraton.

=== Extended stay ===
Extended stay hotels are small to medium-sized hotels that offer longer-term full-service accommodations compared to a traditional hotel. Extended stay hotels may offer non-traditional pricing methods such as a weekly rate that caters towards travelers in need of short-term accommodations for an extended period of time. Similar to limited and select service hotels, on-site amenities are normally limited and most extended stay hotels lack an on-site restaurant. Examples include Staybridge Suites, Candlewood Suites, Homewood Suites by Hilton, Home2 Suites by Hilton, Residence Inn by Marriott, Element, and Extended Stay America.

=== Timeshare and destination clubs ===
Timeshare and destination clubs are a form of property ownership also referred to as a vacation ownership involving the purchase and ownership of an individual unit of accommodation for seasonal usage during a specified period of time. Timeshare resorts often offer amenities similar that of a full-service hotel with on-site restaurants, swimming pools, recreation grounds, and other leisure-oriented amenities. Destination clubs on the other hand may offer more exclusive private accommodations such as private houses in a neighborhood-style setting. Examples of timeshare brands include Hilton Grand Vacations, Marriott Vacation Club International, Westgate Resorts, Disney Vacation Club, and Holiday Inn Club Vacations.

=== Motel ===
A motel, an abbreviation for "motor hotel", is a small-sized low-rise lodging establishment similar to a limited service, lower-cost hotel, but typically with direct access to individual rooms from the car park. Motels were built to serve road travellers, including travellers on road trip vacations and workers who drive for their job (travelling salespeople, truck drivers, etc.). Common during the 1950s and 1960s, motels were often located adjacent to a major highway, where they were built on inexpensive land at the edge of towns or along stretches of freeway.

New motel construction is rare in the 2000s as hotel chains have been building economy-priced, limited-service franchised properties at freeway exits which compete for largely the same clientele, largely saturating the market by the 1990s. Motels are still useful in less populated areas for driving travelers, but the more populated an area becomes, the more hotels move in to meet the demand for accommodation. While many motels are unbranded and independent, many of the other motels which remain in operation joined national franchise chains, often rebranding themselves as hotels, inns or lodges. Some examples of chains with motels include EconoLodge, Motel 6, Super 8, and Travelodge.

Motels in some parts of the world are more often regarded as places for romantic assignations where rooms are often rented by the hour. This is fairly common in parts of Latin America.

In the United States, old, run-down "no-tell motels" have a reputation for tolerating criminal activity such as prostitution and drug dealing.

=== Microstay ===
Hotels may offer rooms for microstays, a type of booking for less than 24 hours where the customer chooses the check in time and the length of the stay. This allows the hotel increased revenue by reselling the same room several times a day. They first gained popularity in Europe but are now common in major global tourist centers.

== Management ==
Hotel management is a globally accepted professional career field and academic field of study. Degree programs such as hospitality management studies, a business degree, and/or certification programs formally prepare hotel managers for industry practice.

Most hotel establishments consist of a general manager who serves as the head executive (often referred to as the "hotel manager"), department heads who oversee various departments within a hotel, middle managers, administrative staff, and line-level supervisors. The organizational chart and volume of job positions and hierarchy varies by hotel size, function, and is often determined by hotel ownership and managing companies.

== Unique and specialty hotels ==
=== Historic inns and boutique hotels ===
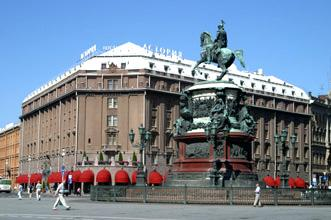
Hotel Astoria and statue of Tsar Nicholas I in Saint Petersburg, Russia

Boutique hotels are typically hotels with a unique environment or intimate setting. Some hotels have gained their renown through tradition, by hosting significant events or persons, such as Schloss Cecilienhof in Potsdam, Germany, which derives its fame from the Potsdam Conference of the World War II allies Winston Churchill, Harry Truman and Joseph Stalin in 1945. The Taj Mahal Palace & Tower in Mumbai is one of India's most famous and historic hotels because of its association with the Indian independence movement. Some establishments have given name to a particular meal or beverage, as is the case with the Waldorf Astoria in New York City, United States where the Waldorf Salad was first created or the Hotel Sacher in Vienna, Austria, home of the Sachertorte. Others have achieved fame by association with dishes or cocktails created on their premises, such as the Hotel de Paris where the crêpe Suzette was invented or the Raffles Hotel in Singapore, where the Singapore Sling cocktail was devised.

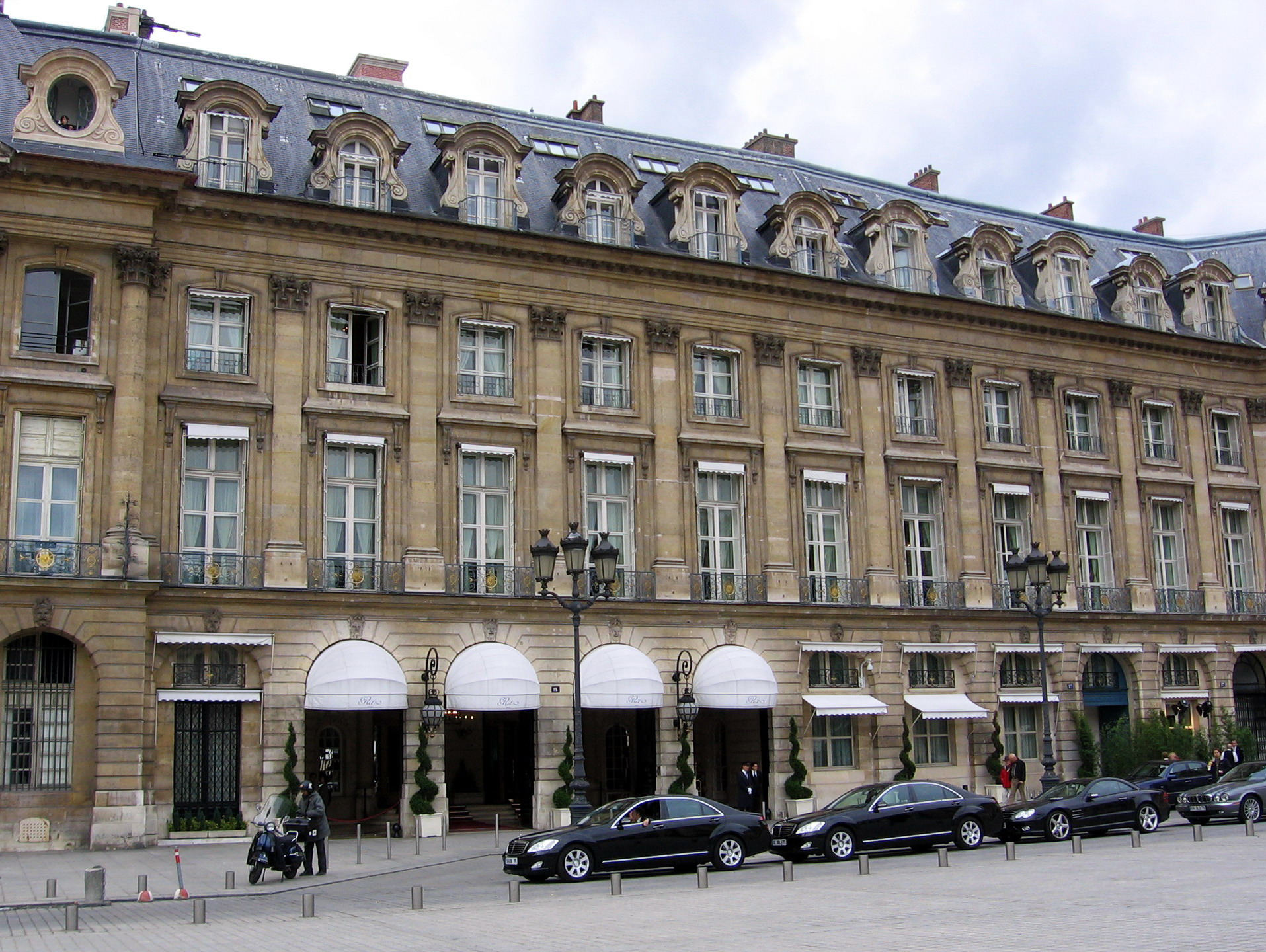
Hôtel Ritz Paris in France

A number of hotels have entered the public consciousness through popular culture, such as the Ritz Hotel in London, through its association with Irving Berlin's song, "Puttin' on the Ritz". The Algonquin Hotel in New York City is famed as the meeting place of the literary group, the Algonquin Round Table, and Hotel Chelsea, also in New York City, has been the subject of a number of songs and the scene of the stabbing of Nancy Spungen (allegedly by her boyfriend Sid Vicious).

=== Resort hotels ===
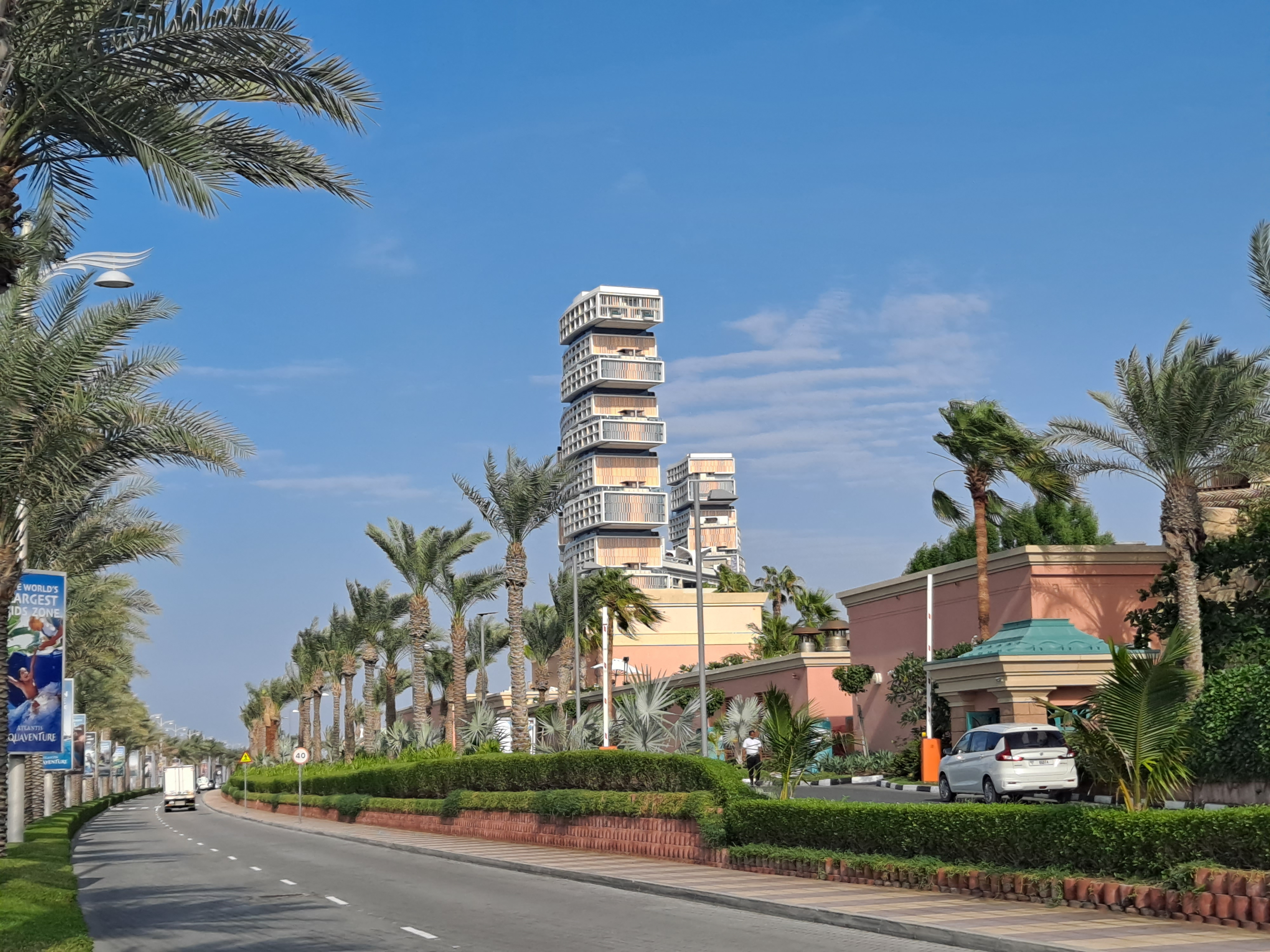
Atlantis The Royal, Dubai, United Arab Emirates

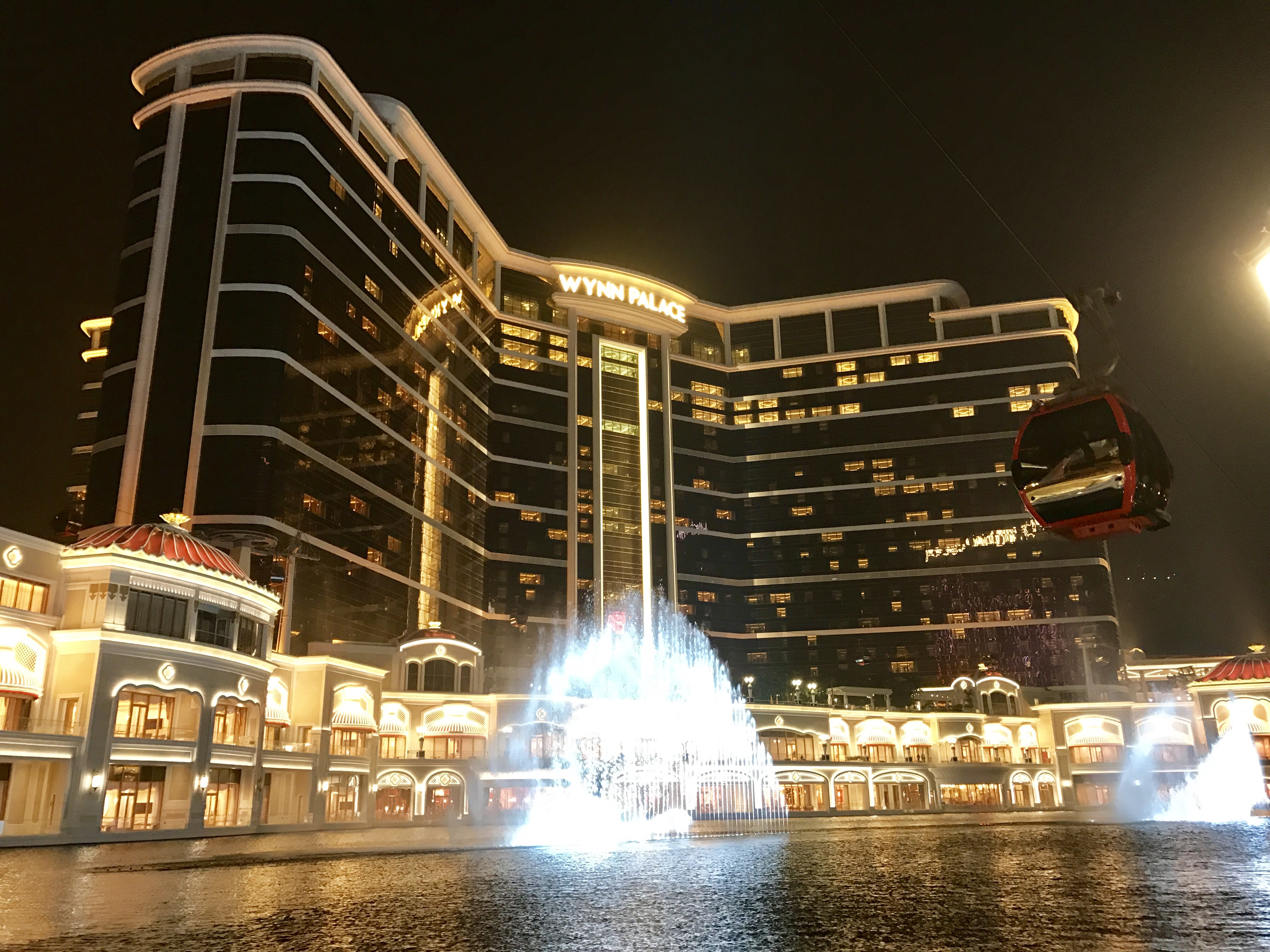
Wynn Palace, Macau

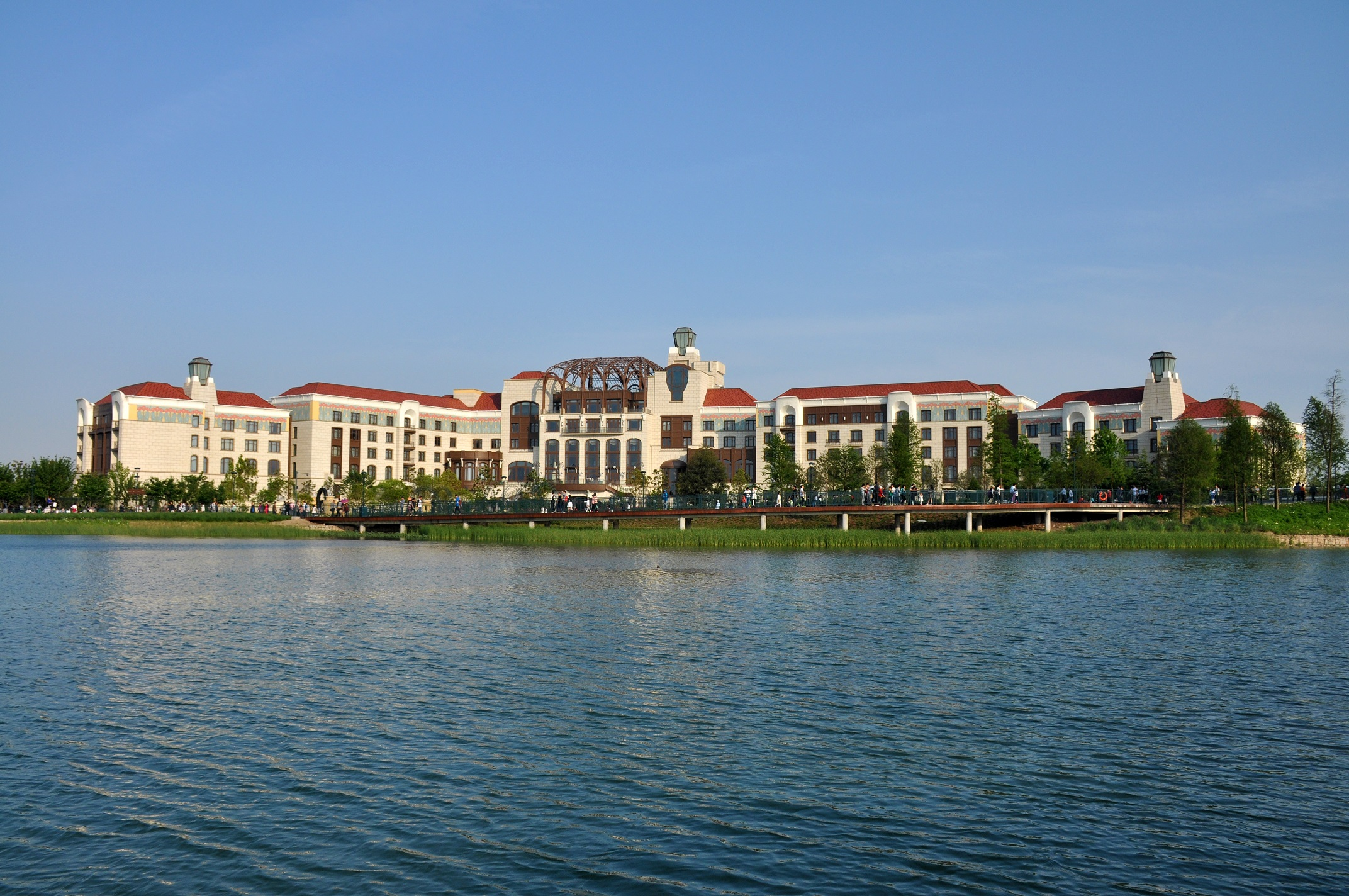
Shanghai Disneyland Hotel, China

Some hotels are built specifically as a destination in itself to create a captive trade as a resort, example at casinos, amusement parks and seaside resorts. Though hotels have always been built in popular destinations, the defining characteristic of a resort hotel is that it exists purely to serve another attraction, the two having the same owners.

On the Las Vegas Strip there is a tradition of one-upmanship with luxurious and extravagant hotels in a concentrated area. This trend now has extended to other resorts worldwide, but the concentration in Las Vegas is still the world's highest: nineteen of the world's twenty-five largest hotels by room count are on the Strip, with a total of over 67,000 rooms.

=== Bunker hotels ===
The Null Stern Hotel in Teufen, Appenzellerland, Switzerland, and the Concrete Mushrooms in Albania are former nuclear bunkers transformed into hotels.

=== Cave hotels ===
The Cuevas Pedro Antonio de Alarcón (named after the author) in Guadix, Spain, as well as several hotels in Cappadocia, Turkey, are notable for being built into natural cave formations, some with rooms underground. The Desert Cave Hotel in Coober Pedy, South Australia, is built into the remains of an opal mine.

=== Cliff hotels ===
Located on the coast but high above sea level, these hotels offer unobstructed panoramic views and a great sense of privacy without the feeling of total isolation. Some examples from around the globe are the Riosol Hotel in Gran Canaria, Caruso Belvedere Hotel in Amalfi Coast (Italy), Aman Resorts Amankila in Bali, Birkenhead House in Hermanus (South Africa), The Caves in Jamaica and Caesar Augustus in Capri.

=== Capsule hotels ===
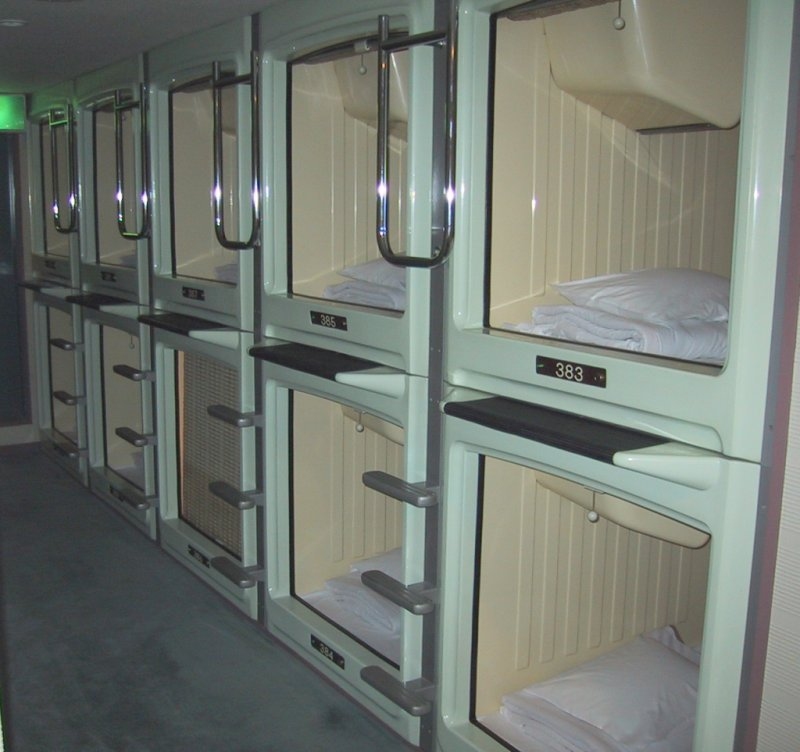
Interior of a capsule hotel in Osaka, Japan

Capsule hotels are a type of economical hotel first introduced in Japan, where people sleep in stacks of bed-sized rectangular containers. In the sleeping capsules, beside the bed, the customer can watch TV, put their valuables in mini safes or lockers, and use wireless internet. Similar to hostels, facilities such as bathrooms, a kitchen, or a lounge are shared.

=== Day room hotels ===
Some hotels fill daytime occupancy with day rooms, for example, Rodeway Inn and Suites near Port Everglades in Fort Lauderdale, Florida. Day rooms are booked in a block of hours typically between 8 am and 5 pm, before the typical night shift. These are similar to transit hotels in that they appeal to travelers, however, unlike transit hotels, they do not eliminate the need to go through Customs.

An emerging trend is hotels offering day passes for guests to use the facilities for the day, without having to pay a full fee for an overnight stay, such as a ResortPass.

=== Garden hotels ===
Garden hotels often originate as famous buildings with gardens before becoming luxury hotels. In Britain, the conversion into a hotel commonly results from the need to improve the finances of estates. These include Gravetye Manor, the home of garden designer William Robinson, and Cliveden, designed by Charles Barry with a rose garden by Geoffrey Jellicoe. Other prominent examples include the Abbasi Hotel in Iran, and Hostal dos Reis Católicos in Spain.

=== Ice, snow and igloo hotels ===
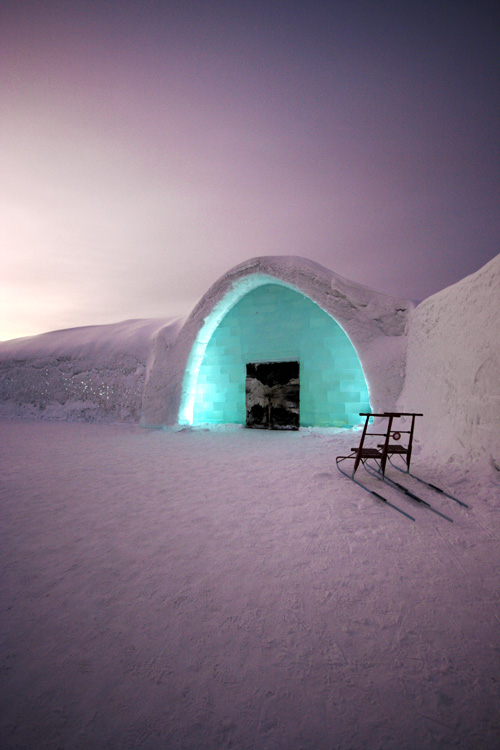
Ice Hotel in Jukkasjärvi, Sweden

The Ice Hotel in Jukkasjärvi, Sweden, was the first ice hotel in the world; first built in 1990, it is built each winter and melts every spring. The Hotel de Glace in Duschenay, Canada, opened in 2001 and it is North America's only ice hotel. It is redesigned and rebuilt in its entirety every year. Ice hotels can also be included within larger ice complexes; for example, the Mammut Snow Hotel in Finland is located within the walls of the Kemi snow castle; and the Lainio Snow Hotel is part of a snow village near Ylläs, Finland. There is an arctic snowhotel in Rovaniemi in Lapland, Finland, along with glass igloos. The first glass igloos were built in 1999 in Finland, they became the Kakslauttanen Arctic Resort with 65 buildings, 53 small ones for two people and 12 large ones for four people. Glass igloos, with their roof made of thermal glass, allow guests to admire auroras comfortably from their beds.

=== Love hotels ===
A love hotel (also 'love motel', especially in Taiwan) is a type of short-stay hotel found around the world, operated primarily for the purpose of allowing guests privacy for sexual activities, typically for one to three hours, but with overnight as an option. Styles of premises vary from extremely low-end to extravagantly appointed. In Japan, love hotels have a history of over 400 years.

=== Portable modular hotels ===
In 2021 a New York-based company introduced new modular and movable hotel rooms which allow landowners and hospitality groups to create and easily scale hotel accommodations. The portable units can be built in three to five months and can be stacked to create multi-floor units.

=== Referral hotel ===
A referral hotel is a hotel chain that offers branding to independently operated hotels; the chain itself is founded by or owned by the member hotels as a group. Many former referral chains have been converted to franchises; the largest surviving member-owned chain is Best Western.

=== Railway hotels ===
The first recorded purpose-built railway hotel was the Great Western Hotel, which opened adjacent to Reading railway station in 1844, shortly after the Great Western Railway opened its line from London. The building still exists, and although it has been used for other purposes over the years, it is now again a hotel and a member of the Malmaison hotel chain.

Frequently, expanding railway companies built grand hotels at their termini, such as the Midland Hotel, Manchester next to the former Manchester Central Station, and in London the ones above St Pancras railway station and Charing Cross railway station. London also has the Chiltern Court Hotel above Baker Street tube station, there are also Canada's grand railway hotels. They are or were mostly, but not exclusively, used by those traveling by rail.

=== Straw bale hotels ===
The Maya Guesthouse in Nax Mont-Noble in the Swiss Alps, is the first hotel in Europe built entirely with straw bales. Due to the insulation values of the walls it needs no conventional heating or air conditioning system, although the Maya Guesthouse is built at an altitude of 1,300 metres (4,300 ft) in the Alps.

=== Transit hotels ===
Transit hotels are short stay hotels typically used at international airports where passengers can stay while waiting to change airplanes. The hotels are typically on the airside and do not require a visa for a stay or re-admission through security checkpoints.

=== Treehouse hotels ===
Some hotels are built with living trees as structural elements, for example the Treehotel near Piteå, Sweden, the Costa Rica Tree House near the Jairo Mora Sandoval Gandoca-Manzanillo Mixed Wildlife Refuge, Costa Rica; the Treetops Hotel in Aberdare National Park, Kenya; the Ariau Towers near Manaus, Brazil, on the Rio Negro in the Amazon; and Bayram's Tree Houses in Olympos, Turkey.

=== Underwater hotels ===
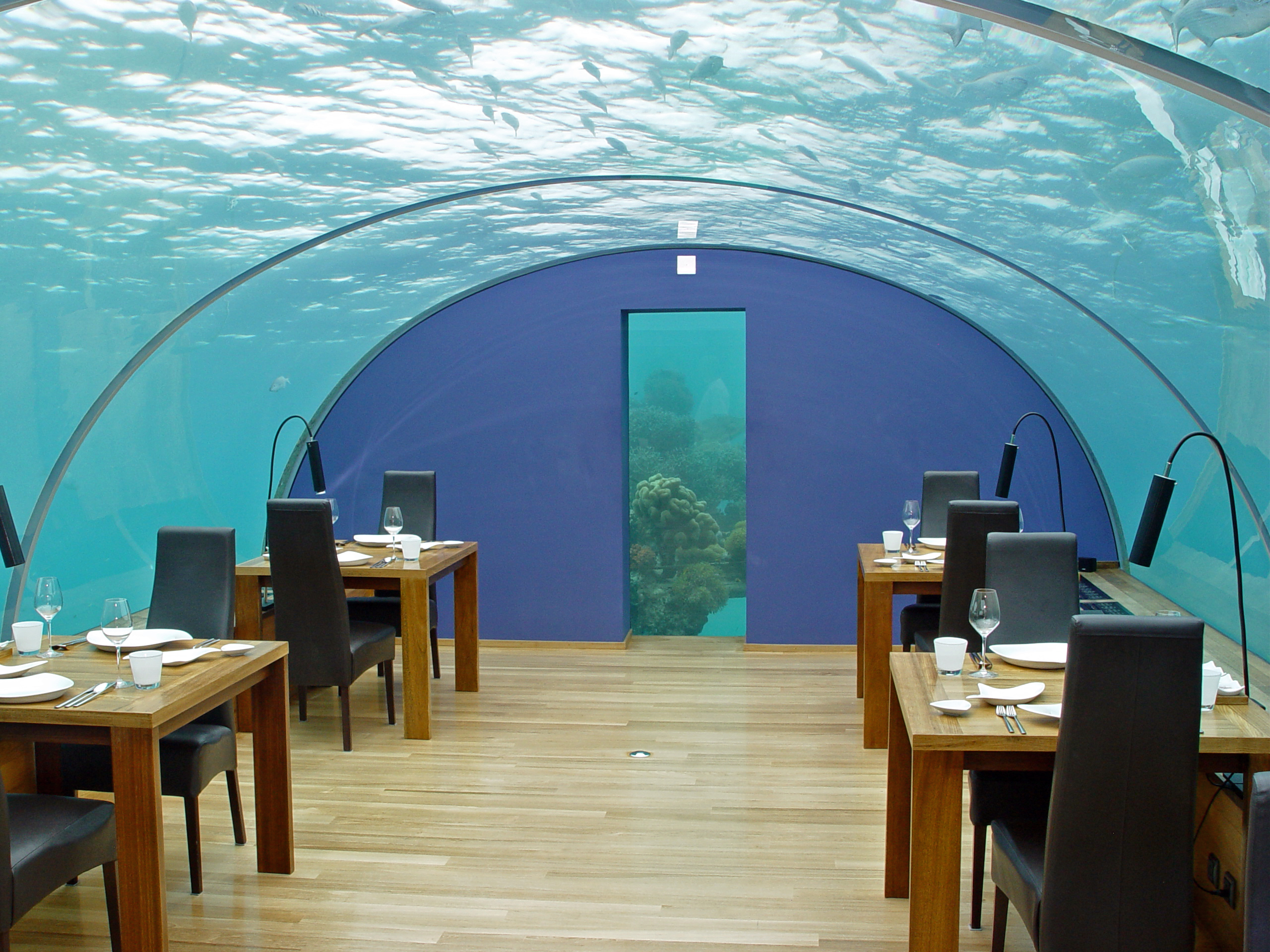
Ithaa, the first undersea restaurant at the Conrad Maldives Rangali Island resort

Some hotels have accommodation underwater, such as Utter Inn in Lake Mälaren, Sweden. Hydropolis, project in Dubai, would have had suites on the bottom of the Persian Gulf, and Jules' Undersea Lodge in Key Largo, Florida, requires scuba diving to access its rooms.

=== Overwater hotels ===
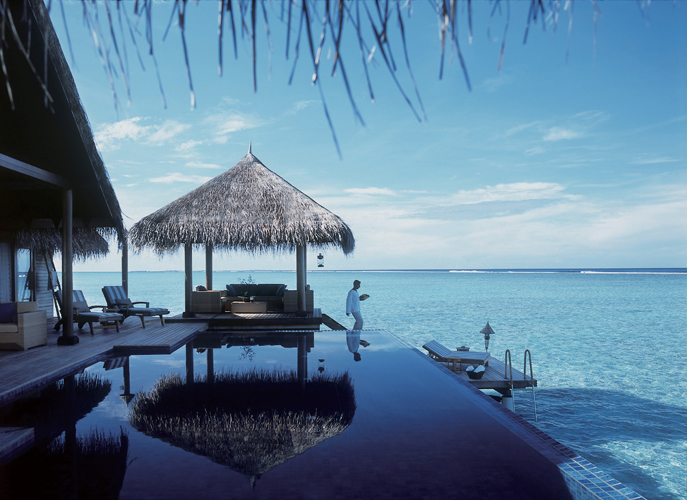
An overwater bungalow on the island resort in the Maldives

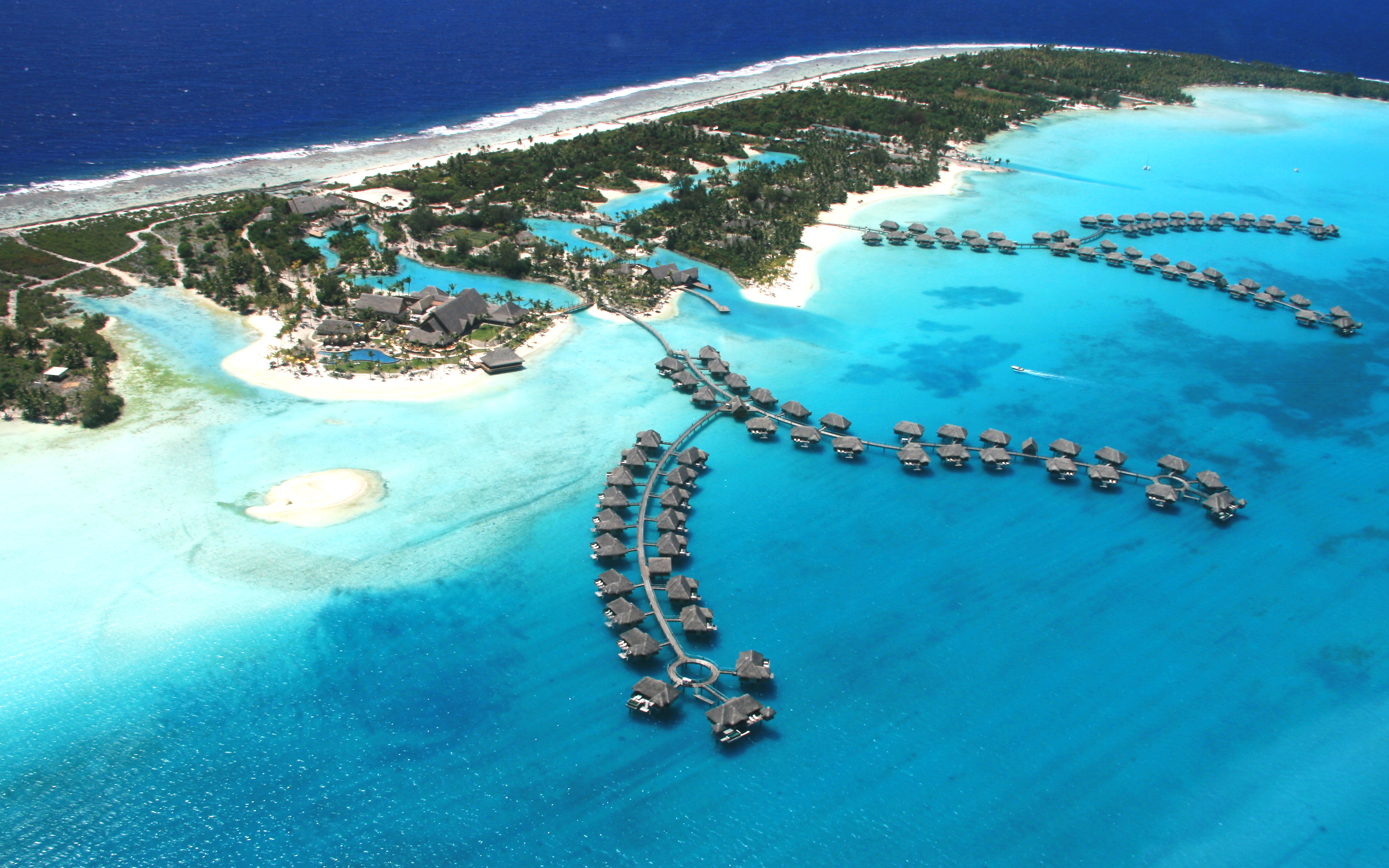
Four Seasons Resort Bora Bora

A resort island is an island or an archipelago that contains resorts, hotels, overwater bungalows, restaurants, tourist attractions and its amenities. Maldives has the most overwater bungalows resorts.

=== Yurt hotels ===
Yurts are circular, self-supporting structures with long rafters coalescing toward a central dome. During the day, the dome allows sunlight to illuminate the entire yurt interior, while moonlight and starlight shine through the dome at night.

=== Other specialty hotels ===
Burj Al Arab stands on an artificial island from Jumeirah Beach and is connected to the mainland by a private curving bridge:

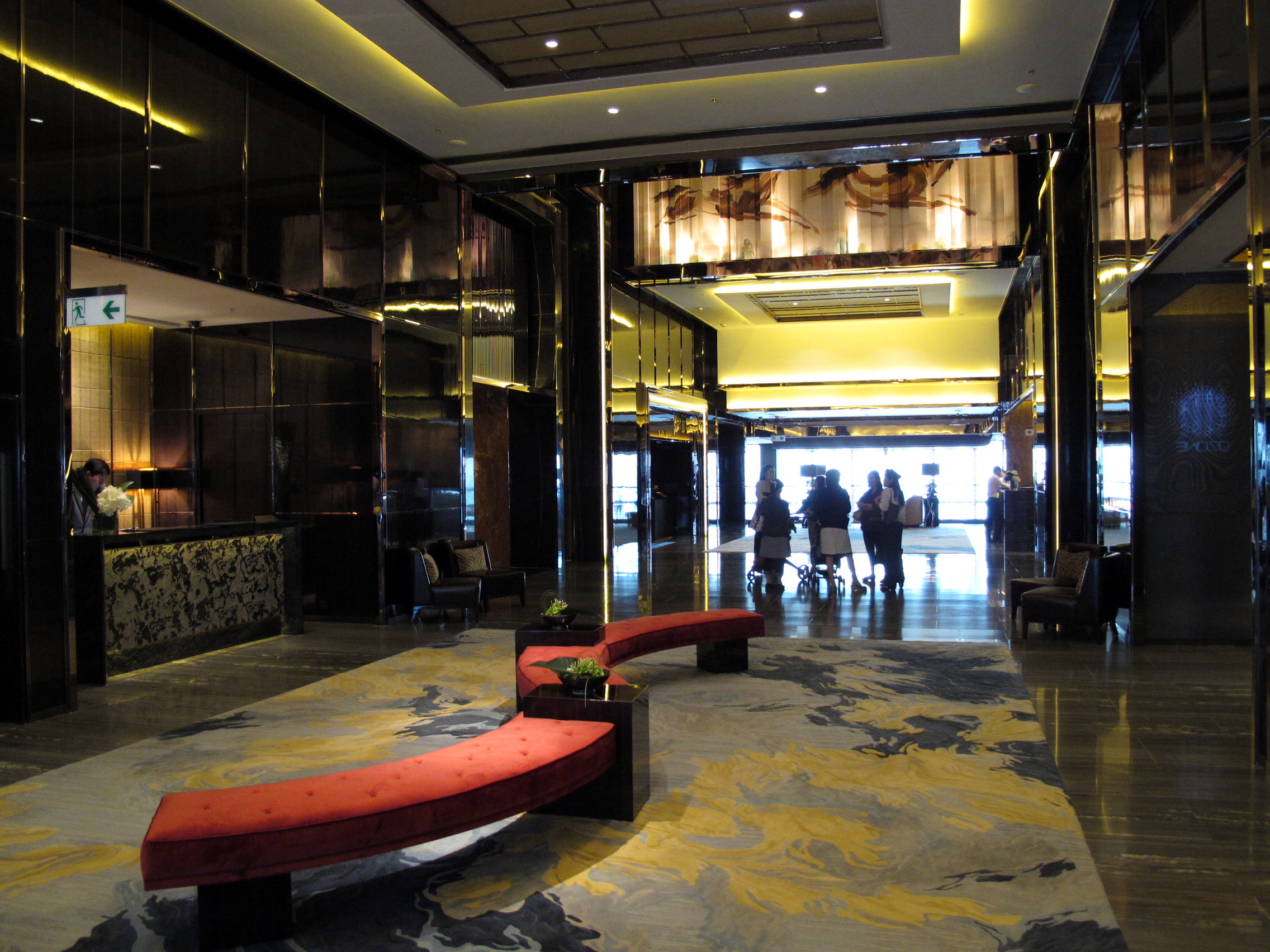
Lobby on 103rd floor at The Ritz-Carlton, Hong Kong

- The Burj al-Arab hotel in Dubai, United Arab Emirates, built on an artificial island, is structured in the shape of a boat's sail.
- The Library Hotel in New York City, is unique in that each of its ten floors is assigned one category from the Dewey Decimal System.
- The Jailhotel Löwengraben in Lucerne, Switzerland, the Malmaison in Oxford, and Bodmin Jail Hotel in Bodmin, are in converted prisons now used as hotels.
- The Luxor, a hotel and casino on the Las Vegas Strip in Paradise, Nevada, United States is unusual due to its pyramidal structure.
- The Ritz-Carlton, Hong Kong on floors 102-118 of the International Commerce Centre in Kowloon, Hong Kong. The lobby is 425 m (1,394 ft) above the ground. It was the highest hotel in the world from 2011 to 2019, and the first hotel located above 100 storeys.
- The Marina Bay Sands in Singapore has the world's longest infinity pool, with a 146 m (479 ft) vanishing edge located 191 m (627 ft) above ground.
- The Liberty Hotel in Boston used to be the Charles Street Jail.
- Hotel Kakslauttanen in Finland is a collection of glass igloos in Lapland that allow guests to watch the Northern Lights from their rooms.
- Built in Scotland and completed in 1936, the former ocean liner RMS Queen Mary in Long Beach, California, United States uses its first-class staterooms as a hotel, having retired in 1967 from transatlantic service.
- The Wigwam Motels used patented novelty architecture in which each motel room was a free-standing concrete wigwam or teepee.
- The Bus Collective in Singapore was built from 20 retired public buses, and opened in 2023.

== Records ==
=== Largest ===
In 2006, Guinness World Records listed the First World Hotel in Genting Highlands, Malaysia, as the world's largest hotel with a total of 6,118 rooms (and which has now expanded to 7,351 rooms). The Izmailovo Hotel in Moscow has the most beds, with 7,500, followed by The Venetian and The Palazzo complex in Las Vegas (7,117 rooms) and MGM Grand Las Vegas complex (6,852 rooms).

=== Oldest ===
According to the Guinness Book of World Records, the oldest hotel in operation is the Nisiyama Onsen Keiunkan in Yamanashi, Japan. The hotel, first opened in AD 707, has been operated by the same family for forty-six generations. The title was held until 2011 by the Hoshi Ryokan, in the Awazu Onsen area of Komatsu, Japan, which opened in the year 718, as the history of the Nisiyama Onsen Keiunkan was previously virtually unknown.

=== Highest ===
The Rosewood Guangzhou, located on the top floors of the 108-story Guangzhou CTF Finance Centre in Tianhe District, Guangzhou, China, is the world's highest hotel. It is 530 meters above ground level at its highest point.

=== Most expensive purchase ===
In October 2014, the Anbang Insurance Group, based in China, purchased the Waldorf Astoria New York in Manhattan for US$1.95 billion, making it the world's most expensive hotel ever sold.

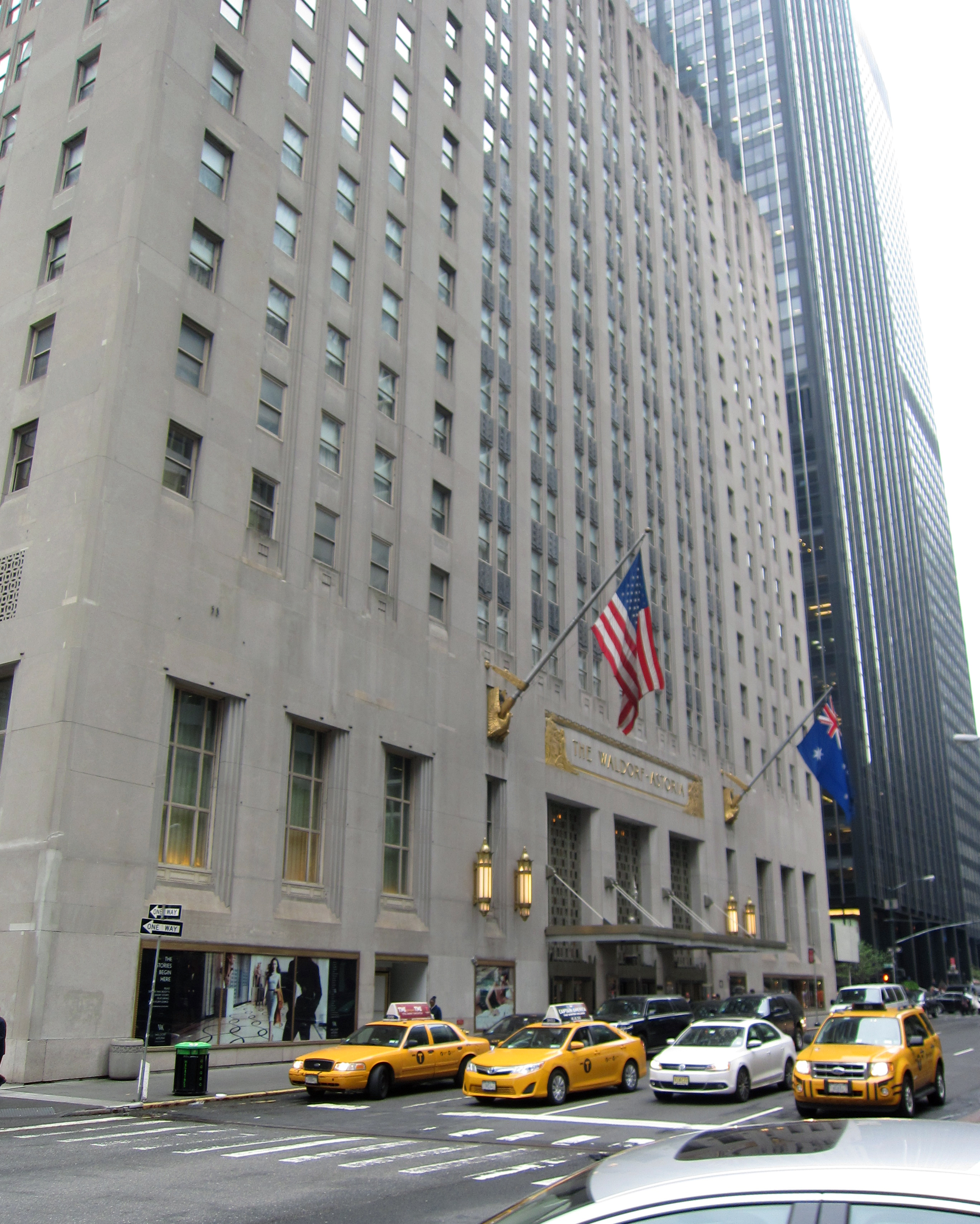
The Waldorf Astoria New York, the most expensive hotel ever sold, cost US$1.95 billion in 2014.

== Long term residence ==
Many people live permanently or semi-permanently in hotels, whether in apartment hotels specifically designed for longer-term stays, or in other types of hotels.

Since hotels do not require an application process or a long-term commitment, they can be attractive housing alternatives. People who have no fixed address, such as digital nomads, may live in hotels, as well as people on long-term work assignments away from home. Hotel living can also be appealing due to the lack of responsibility for home maintenance, inclusion of regular housekeeping service, and ready availability of amenities such as room service, swimming pools, and fitness centers. In the United States in the 2020s, older hotels are increasingly serving as low-cost housing for the poor. For regulatory reasons, they can be more readily available than single-room occupancy housing or boarding houses, which commonly met this need in the past.

=== Public figures who have lived in hotels ===
A number of public figures have notably chosen to take up semi-permanent or permanent residence in hotels.

- Fashion designer Coco Chanel lived in the Hôtel Ritz, Paris, on and off for more than 30 years.
- Inventor Nikola Tesla lived the last ten years of his life at the New Yorker Hotel until he died in his room in 1943.
- Larry Fine (of The Three Stooges) and his family lived in hotels, due to his extravagant spending habits and his wife's dislike for housekeeping. They first lived in the President Hotel in Atlantic City, New Jersey, where his daughter Phyllis was raised, then the Knickerbocker Hotel in Hollywood. Not until the late 1940s did Fine buy a home in the Los Feliz area of Los Angeles.
- The Waldorf-Astoria Hotel and its affiliated Waldorf Towers has been the home of many famous persons over the years including former President Herbert Hoover who lived there from the end of his presidency in 1933 until his death in 1964. General Douglas MacArthur lived his last 14 years in the penthouse of the Waldorf Towers. Composer Cole Porter spent the last 25 years of his life in an apartment at the Waldorf Towers.
- Billionaire Howard Hughes lived in hotels during the last ten years of his life (1966–76), primarily in Las Vegas, as well as Acapulco, Beverly Hills, Boston, Freeport, London, Managua, Nassau, Vancouver, and others.
- Vladimir Nabokov and his wife Vera lived in the Montreux Palace Hotel in Montreux, Switzerland, from 1961 until his death in 1977.
- Actor Richard Harris lived at the Savoy Hotel while in London. Hotel archivist Susan Scott recounts an anecdote that, when he was being taken out of the building on a stretcher shortly before his death in 2002, he raised his hand and told the diners "it was the food."
- Egyptian actor Ahmed Zaki lived his last 15 years in Ramses Hilton Hotel – Cairo.
- British entrepreneur Jack Lyons lived in the Hotel Mirador Kempinski in Switzerland for several years until his death in 2008.
- American actress Ethel Merman lived in the Berkshire Hotel in Manhattan for many years but was evicted in 1978 by new ownership who did not want permanent residents.
- American actress Elaine Stritch lived in the Savoy Hotel in London for over a decade.
- Uruguayan-Argentinian tango composer Horacio Ferrer lived almost 40 years, from 1976 until his death in 2014, in an apartment inside the Alvear Palace Hotel, in Buenos Aires, one of the most exclusive hotels in the city.

== See also ==
- Lists of hotels
- List of chained-brand hotels
- List of defunct hotel chains
- Casino hotel
  - List of casino hotels
- Niche tourism markets
- Resort
  - Resort hotel

=== Industry and careers ===
- Bellhop
- Concierge
- Front desk clerk, a type of clerk
- General manager
- GOPPAR, RevPAR, TRevPAR – hotel profitability equations.
- Hospitality industry
- Hotel rating
- Innkeeper
- Night auditor
- Property caretaker
- Tourism

=== Human habitation types ===
- Apartment hotel
- Boutique hotel
- Caravanserai
- Cruise ship
- Dharamshala
- Dak bungalow
- Eco hotel
- Guest house
- Glamping
- Homestay
- Hostal
- Human habitats
- Inn
- Serviced apartment
- Vacation rental
- Pop-up hotel
