= Adjusted RevPAR =

Performance metric

Adjusted RevPAR (or ARPAR, adjusted revenue per available room), is a performance metric used in the hospitality industry. It is calculated by dividing the variable net revenues of a property by the total available rooms (see more formulas below).

The difference between ARPAR and other metrics (RevPAR, TRevPAR, GOPPAR) is that it accounts for variable costs and additional revenue.

== Calculations ==
Various formulas can be used to calculate ARPAR

- (Room revenue + other Revenues – VarCPOR х number of occupied rooms) / total number of rooms available for sale
- (Room revenue/number of occupied rooms + other revenues/number of occupied rooms – VarCPOR) x occupancy
- [(Room revenue/number of occupied rooms + other revenues/number of occupied rooms – VarCPOR) х number of occupied rooms] / (number of rooms at the hotel x number of days in the period)

where VarCPOR is variable costs per occupied room

The most commonly used formula is:

- ARPAR = (ADR – Var costs per occ room + additional revenues per occ room) x occupancy

== How it compares to RevPAR ==
ARPAR accounts for variable costs and additional revenues, thus it reflects the profit (bottom line) versus top line revenue.

== How it compares to GOPPAR ==
GOPPAR accounts for all costs (not only variable) and is retroactive. ARPAR considers revenues from all departments and only var costs and can be used in forecasts.

== Conditions ==
- There is no standard formula for CPOR (cost per occupied room) in the industry and no standardization in regards to separating variable costs from fixed, which requires approximation when calculating VarCPOR. However, these calculations are only performed once.
- Due to the above, ARPAR of each individual property can not be compared to others and is intended for internal use only.

== See also ==
- GOPPAR
- TRevPAR
- RevPAR
