= Average daily rate =

Common lodging industry statistic

Average Daily Rate (ADR) is a statistical unit that is often used in the lodging industry. The number represents the average rental income per paid occupied room in a given time period. ADR along with the property's occupancy are the foundations for the property's financial performance.

ADR is one of the commonly used financial indicators in hotel industry used to measure how well a hotel performs compared to its competitors and itself (year over year). It is common in the hotel industry for the ADR to gradually increase year over year bringing in more revenue. However, ADR itself is not enough to measure the performance of the hotel. One should combine ADR, occupancy and RevPAR (revenue per available room) to make a sound judgment on hotel performance.

== Factors ==
ADR can vary significantly due to external factors like seasonal demand, local events, or economic conditions. Understanding these variables can help hotel management make more informed pricing decisions.

== Formula ==
ADR is calculated by dividing the rooms revenue earned by the number of rooms sold, with house use rooms and complimentary rooms excluded from the denominators.
