= ResortPass =

American hospitality company

- Industry: Hospitality
- Founded: 2016
- Headquarters: New York City, United States
- Area served: United States, Mexico, Bahamas, Costa Rica
- Key people: Michael Wolf (CEO)
- Products: Hotel/resort passes
- Website: resortpass.com

ResortPass is an American hospitality company that partners with hotels and resorts to offer day passes for access to amenities such as pools, spas, and fitness centers, without requiring an overnight stay. The company was established in 2016 and as of 2025 the CEO is Michael Wolf.

As of June 2025 it has agreements with over 2000 hotels across 400 US cities, Mexico and the Caribbean. It has agreements with over 400 hotels in the Hilton Hotels & Resorts chain, and other luxury hotel chains such as Ritz-Carlton, Four Seasons and Hyatt.

== Background ==
ResortPass was established in 2016. The company received investment from Charles River Ventures, Declaration Partners and The Points Guy. As of 2025, the CEO was Michael Wolf, who previously worked at ClassPass, Supernatural, Lululemon and FreshDirect.

== Description ==
According to the Bureau of Labor Statistics, average hotel prices increased by almost 14% between August 2019 and August 2024, and the company attempts to more than mitigate these costs. Research conducted by the company indicated that 85% of people surveyed felt refreshed even after a day's break from work, so the company aims at providing for busy people who want a short break without paying the high costs of luxury hotel stays.

According to CEO Michael Wolf, ResortPass is “aimed at overnight guests [who] overestimate the amount they’re going to use the amenities dramatically because they are also there to work or explore or do nothing.” It offers daycations, pool, spa or gym days with Day Passes. ResortPass aims to integrate with the loyalty programmes of hotel chains. Hotel facilities such as pools and spas are often underutilized during week days, so is lucrative to hotels which form agreements with ResortPass to cash in on their facilities, particularly as locals are more likely to make visits more regularly with a pass. Passes ranges from as low as $25 up to several hundred dollars.

Day passes are popular among local residents seeking short-term leisure experiences, particularly during weekends and holidays. Some users have reported combining remote work with day pass access, working from hotel pools or lounges.

== Agreements ==
As of June 2025, the company has alliances with over 2000 hotels, in over 400 cities across 35 American states, and in the Bahamas, Mexico and Hawaii.

ResortPass has agreements with hotels such as Hilton Hotels & Resorts (over 200 hotels), Wyndham Hotels & Resorts, Conrad Hotels, Hyatt, JW Marriott Hotels (including JW Marriott Chicago), Park Hyatt Chicago, the Waldorf-Astoria, The Dominick, the William Vale, Virgin Hotels and Arlo Williamsburg in New York City, the Ritz-Carlton (Bal Harbour) and Fontainebleau in Miami, Rosewood (Miramar Beach, California), Auberge (Sedona), the Fairmont Grand Del Mar (San Diego), the Four Seasons Resort (Nevis), Wyndham Grand Orlando Bonnet Creek (Orlando, Florida), the French Leave Resort, Eleuthera Island, in the Bahamas, and Botanika Osa Peninsula in Costa Rica.
