= Mikael Genberg =

Swedish artist (born 1960s)

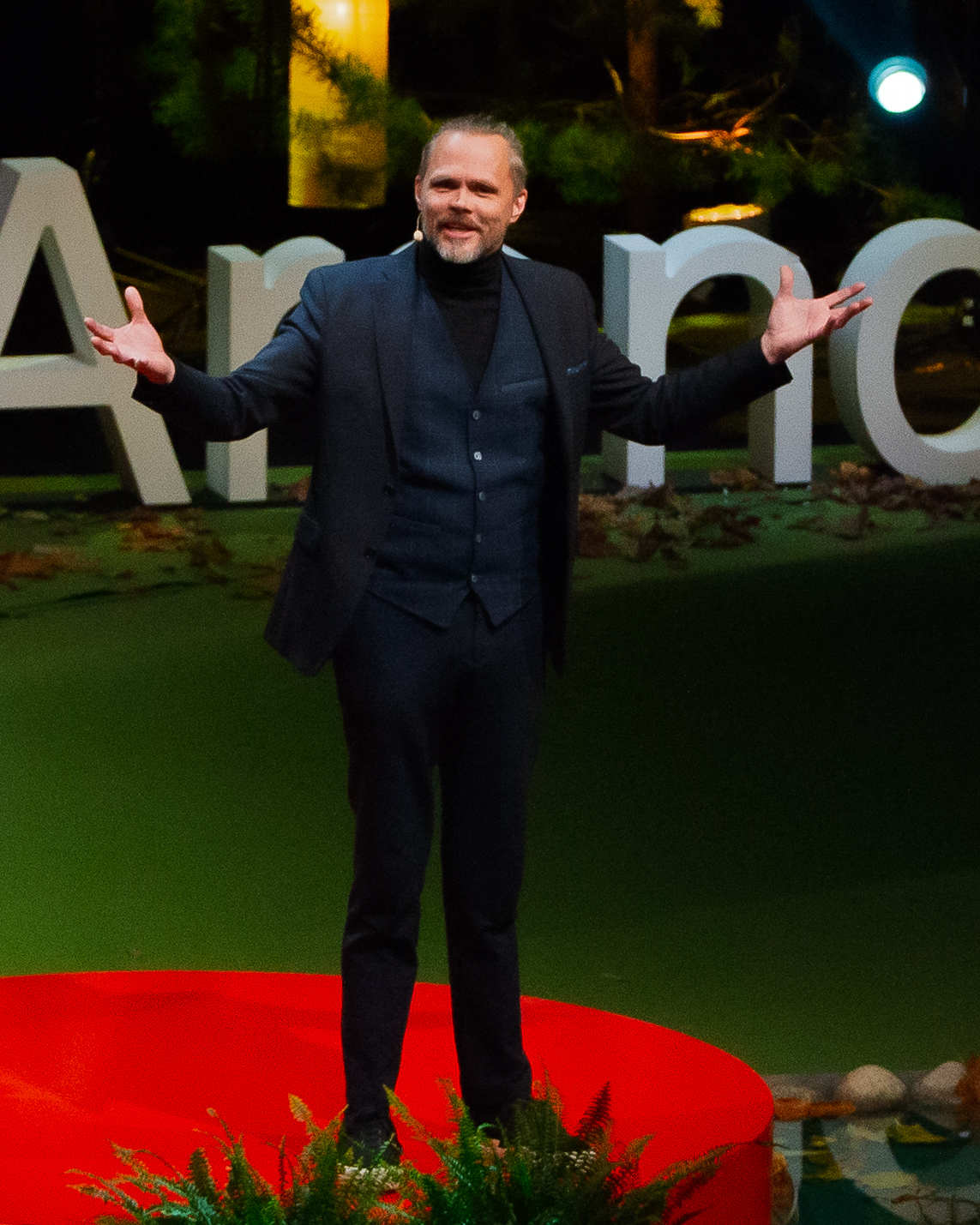
- Genberg at TEDxArendal, Norway, 2019
- Born: 1963 or 1964 (age 61–62)
- Citizenship: Sweden
- Occupation: Artist

Mikael Genberg (born 1963 or 1964) is a Swedish artist who makes traditional red Swedish cottages with white corners. In 1999, he sent a small cardstock version of the house into space on board the STS-128 mission of the Space Shuttle Discovery. In 2025, he sent a house the size of a "big hand" to the Moon on Hakuto-R Mission 2, but it crash landed. Genberg has also placed a house of this design in a tree, has sent one to the Great Wall of China, has placed one on the Avicii Arena in Sweden and has used one to make Utter Inn, which offers underwater accommodation.

== Career ==
Genberg's works are based on the design of red traditional Swedish homes with white corners, which he says is the design that a Swedish child typically draws when asked to draw a house. Genberg grew up in one of these homes.

In 1999 when Genberg learnt that SMART-1, a probe that went to the Moon, was made by the Swedish Space Corporation, he came up with the idea of sending a traditional red Swedish house to the Moon. In 2009, Genberg sent a cardstock version of the house up into space, and it was unfolded by Swedish astronaut Christer Fuglesang on the Space Shuttle Discovery mission STS-128, which went to the International Space Station.

On 26 May 2009, Genberg placed a small cottage in aluminum with a 12-square-metre (130 sq ft) base on the Globe of Avicii Arena, an indoor arena in Sweden. Genberg intended it to illustrate two important symbols for Sweden: the high-technology Globe building and the traditional, simple small countryside cottage in Falu red with white trim. The house was positioned some distance from the exact top position of the Globe. The cottage remained on the Globe until October 2009.

Genberg has made a red Swedish house that offers underwater accommodation (Utter Inn). Another one he has made has gone to the Great Wall of China and another one in a tree.

The Moonhouse was a red and white Swedish house that was sent to the Moon in 2025. It was 10 centimetres (3.9 in) tall, 8 centimetres (3.1 in) wide and 12 centimetres (4.7 in) long, or about "the size of a big hand". It was originally planned by Genberg to be 2.5 metres (8.2 ft) tall and to unfold on the Moon's surface. The house was launched to the Moon in June 2025 on the Hakuto-R Mission 2. The idea was that the house would be dropped onto the lunar regolith, and the rover would take pictures of it, but the mission failed and the lander crashed onto the Moon. About 7–10 million Swedish kronor (US$620,000–888,000) was donated to the project by 70 donors, which included the flight cost.

== Gallery ==
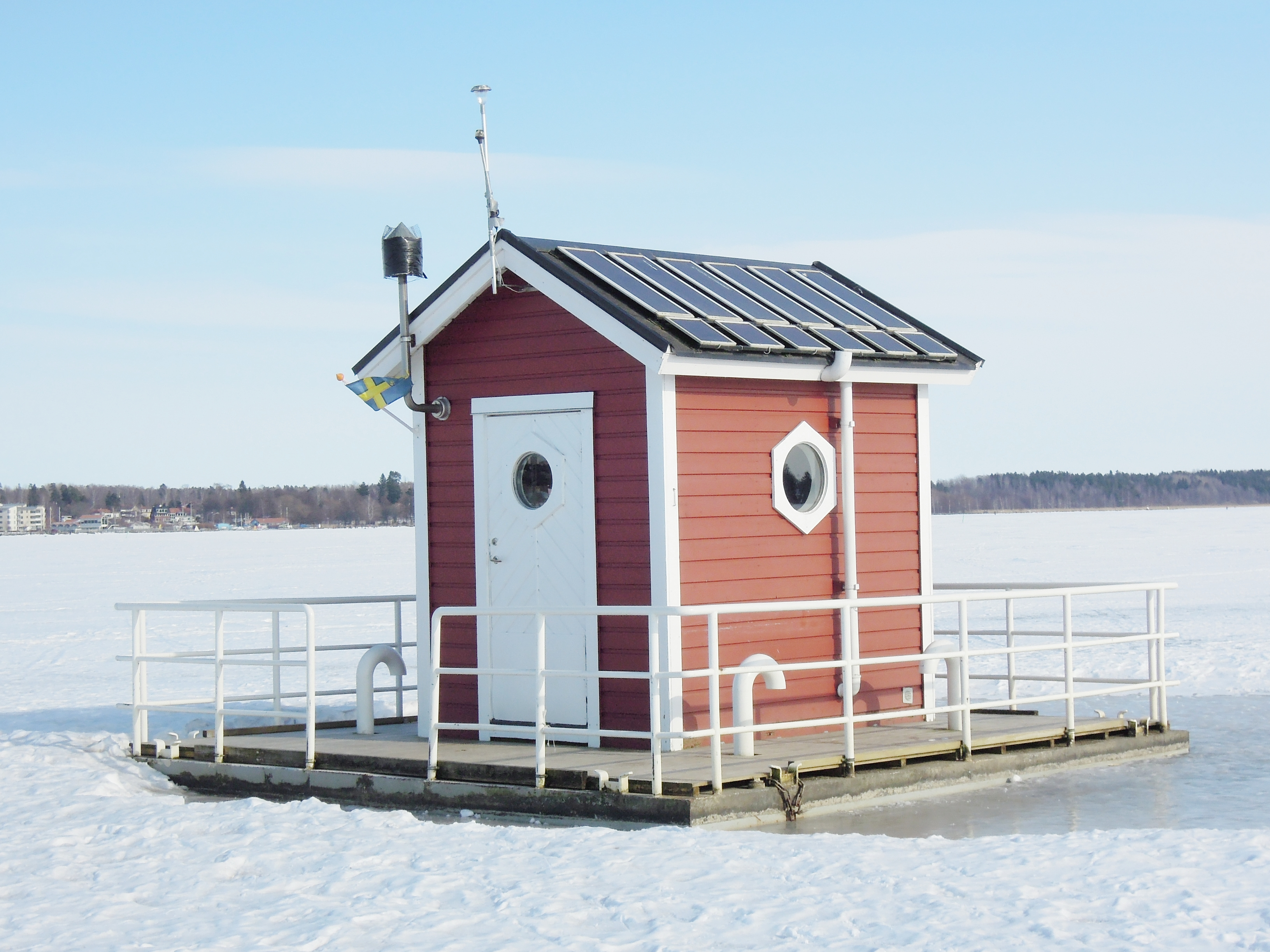
Utter Inn

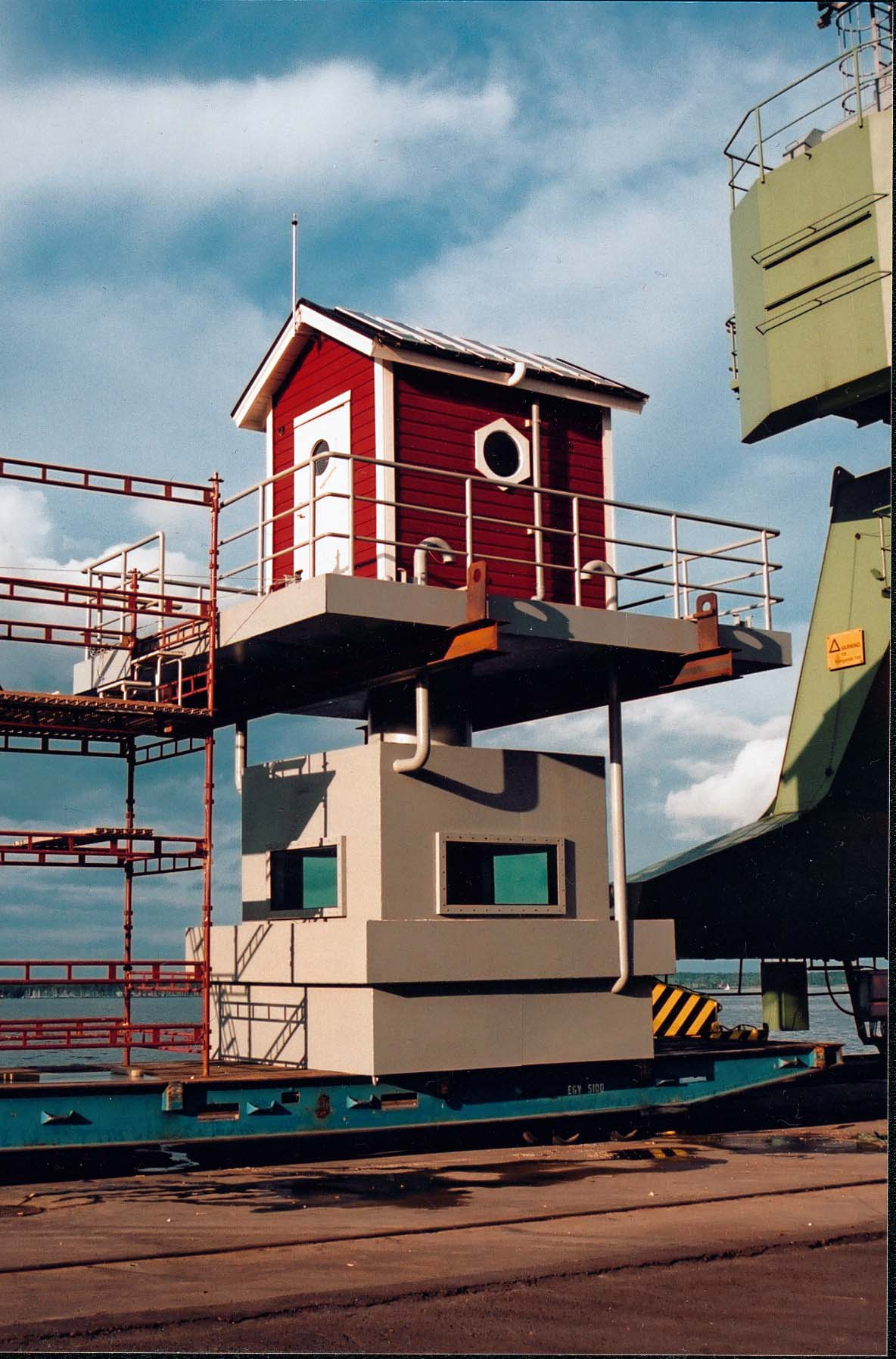
Utter Inn

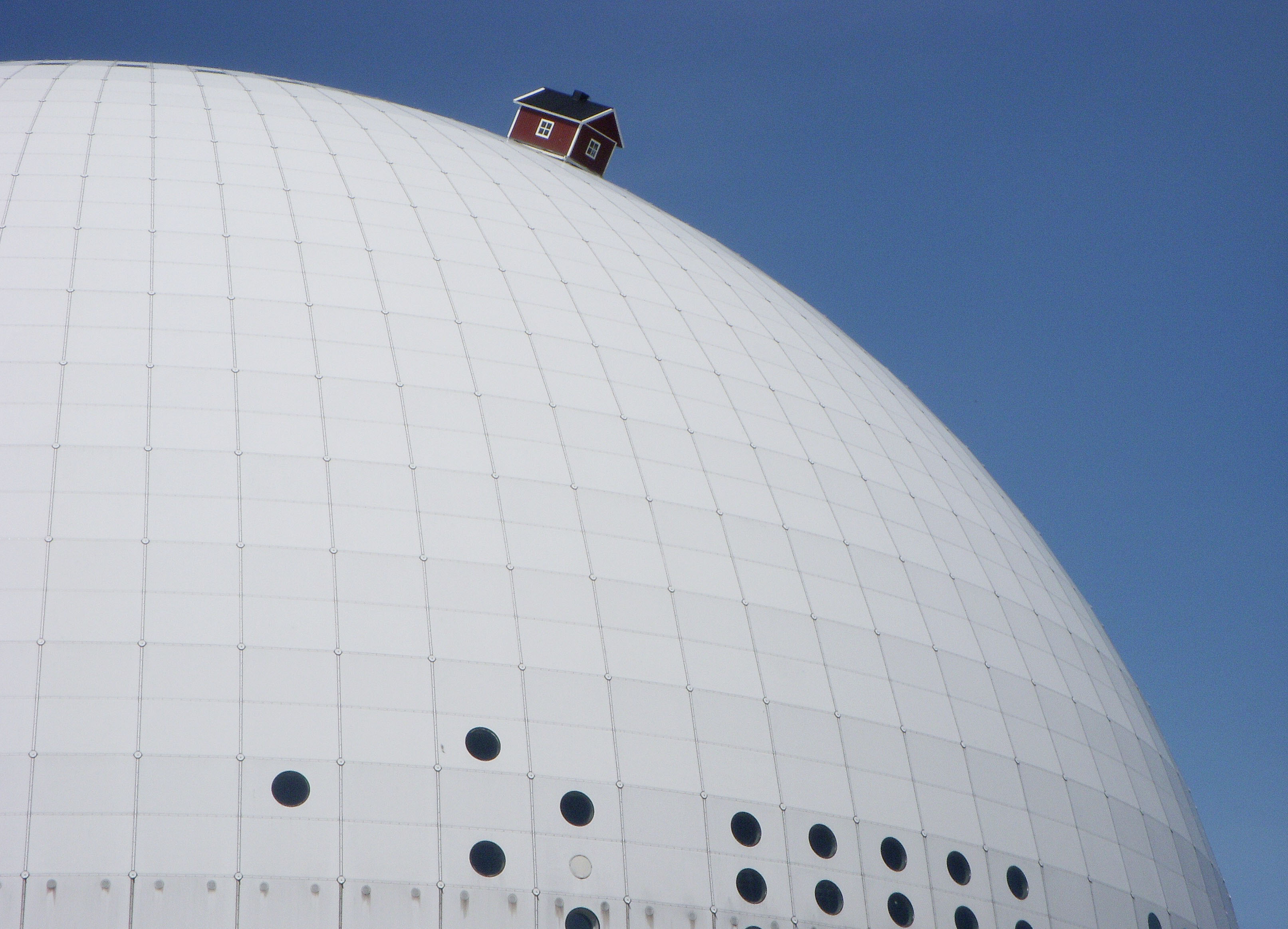
A cottage on Avicii Arena

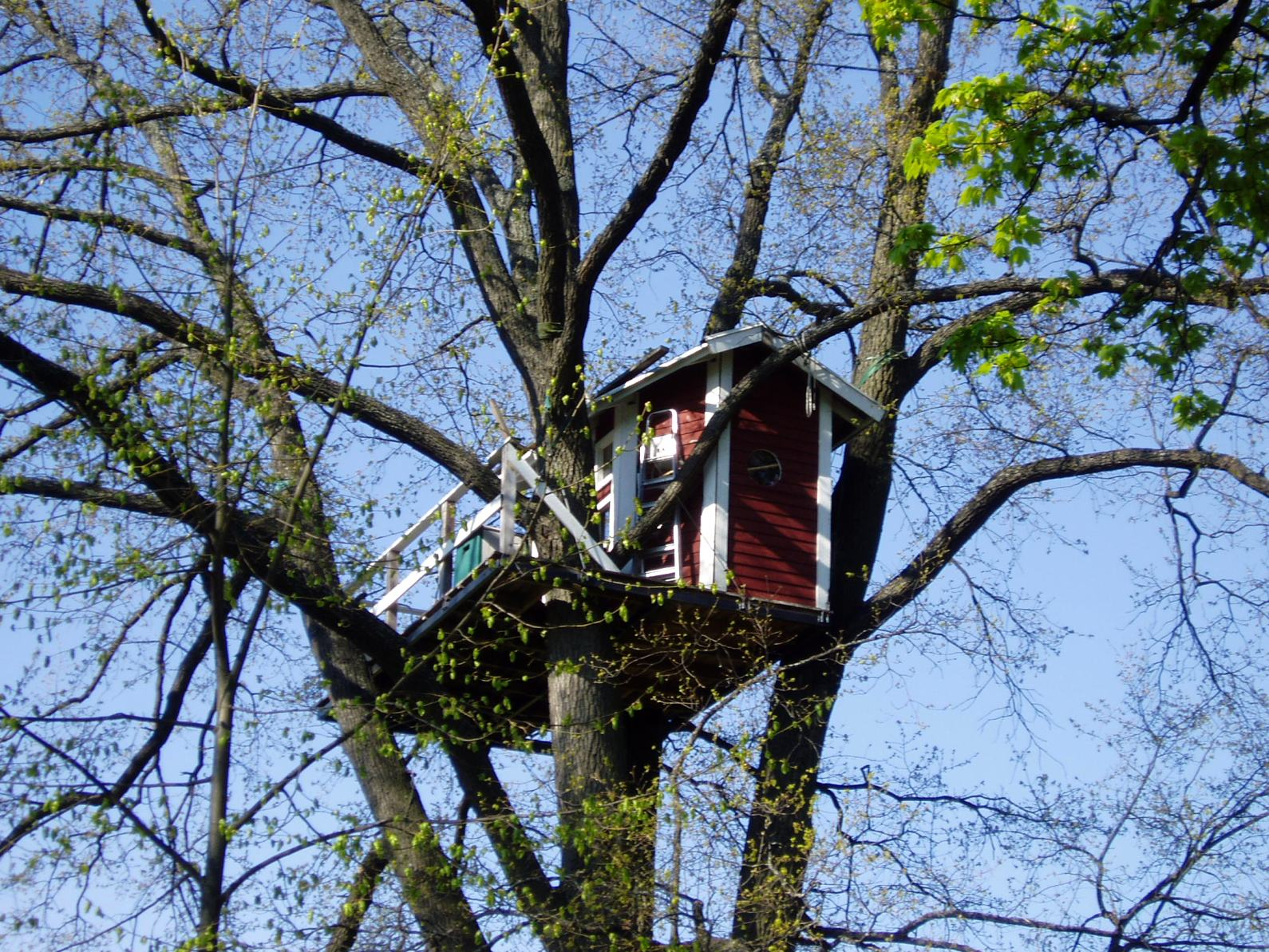
Hotell Hackspett (Woodpecker Hotel)
