= Poseidon Undersea Resorts =

Proposed chain of underwater five-star resorts

- Parent: U.S.Submarines, Inc
- Website: Poseideon Undersea Resorts

Poseidon Undersea Resorts was a proposed chain of underwater five-star resorts that was first slated to open by September 2008. The first was to be located on a private island in Fiji. The project was to be the world's first permanent one-atmosphere seafloor structure.

== Concept ==
Poseidon was conceived and developed by L. Bruce Jones, president of U.S. Submarines, Inc.

== Location ==
The proposed location was Katafanga Island in Fiji. With a design concept in mind, Jones needed to find an appropriate location. To help find it, Jones offered a $10,000 reward for anybody that came up with the perfect location for the venture. After taking the suggestion of a business associate, who recommended a reef off Eleuthera, an island in the Bahamas, negotiations began with the island's American owners. The negotiations did not go well, and after a year of failed back-and-forth offers the location was scrapped and sights were set off Fiji.

== Features ==
The resort was to feature twenty-four 550-square-foot (51 m^{2}) guest rooms, an underwater restaurant and bar, a library, conference room, wedding chapel, spa and a 1,200-square-foot (110 m^{2}) luxury suite. Reservations at the resort were to be priced at $30,000 per couple per week.

== See also ==
- Utter Inn
- Underwater habitat
