= Utter Inn =

Art project in Sweden with underwater accommodation

Coordinates: 59.5956°N 16.5639°E

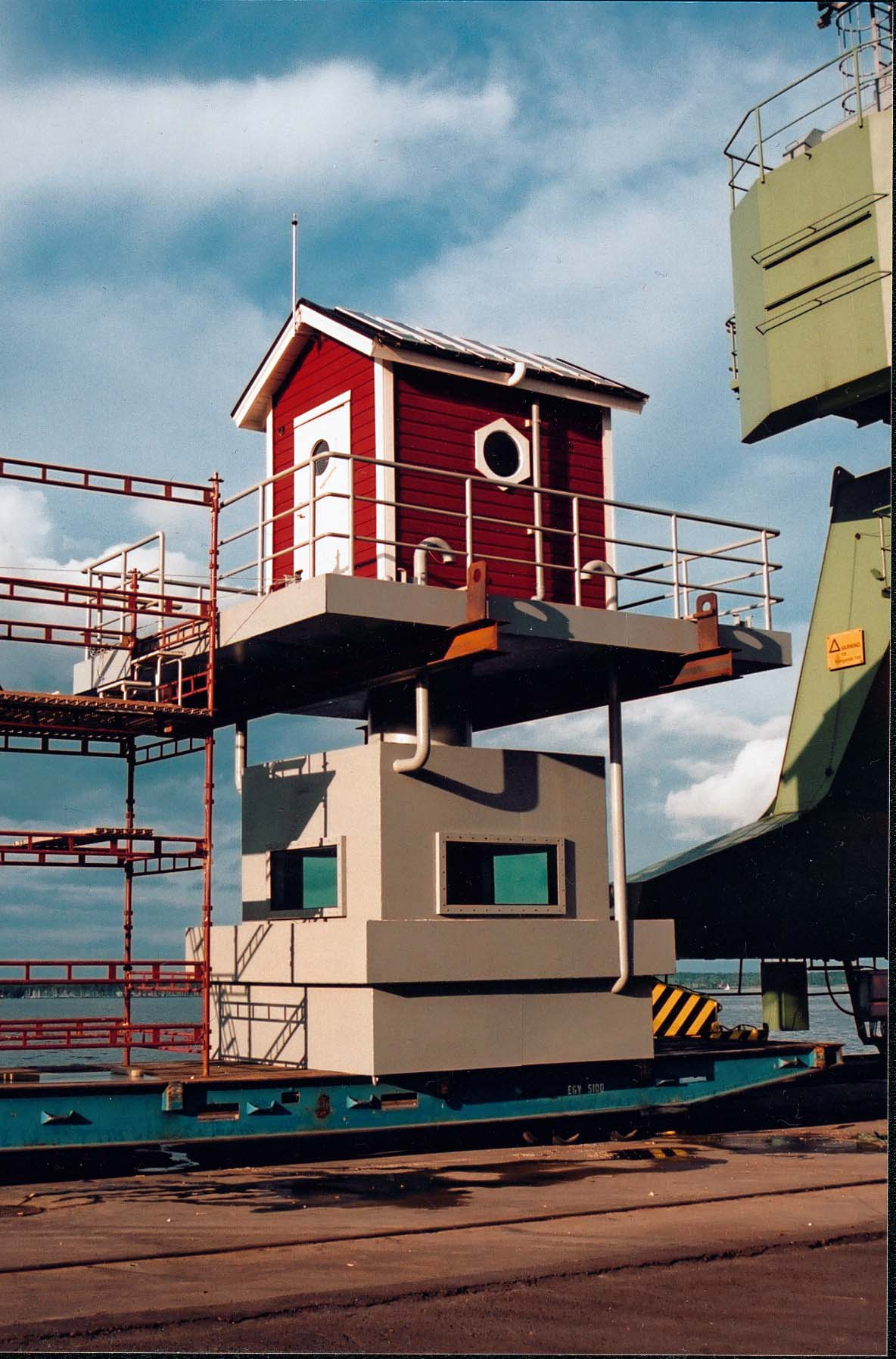
The house before going underwater.

Utter Inn (Swedish) or in English, Otter Inn, is an art project by Mikael Genberg that offers underwater accommodation to the public. The facility is entered through a small, typical-appearing Swedish house on the surface of the water. The only representation of this concept is, at this point, in Lake Mälaren near the town of Västerås in Sweden.

== See also ==
- Poseidon Undersea Resorts
- Underwater habitat
