= GOPPAR =

Performance indicator for hotels

GOPPAR is the abbreviation for gross operating profit per available room, a key performance indicator for the hotel industry.

It gives greater insight in the actual performance of a hotel than the most commonly used RevPAR as it not only considers revenues generated, but also factors in operational costs related with such revenues.

GOPPAR is the total revenue of the hotel less expenses incurred earning that revenue, divided by the available rooms.

GOPPAR does not take into consideration the revenue mix of the hotel, so while it does not allow an accurate evaluation of the room revenue generated, it demonstrates the profitability and value of the property as a whole.

== Calculation ==
$$GOPPAR = Gross Operating Profit/Rooms Available \,$$

- GOPPAR is the gross operating profit per available room
- Gross Operating Profit is the net revenue from the hotel after expenses
- Rooms Available are the rooms available for sale during the time period

== See also ==
- RevPAR
- TRevPAR
