= TRevPAR =

TRevPAR, or total revenue per available room, is a performance metric in the hotel industry. TRevPAR is calculated by dividing the total net revenues of a property by the total available rooms.

TRevPAR is the preferred metric for accountants and hotel owners because it effectively determines the overall financial performance of a property, while RevPAR only takes into account revenue from rooms. TRevPAR is useful for hotels where rooms are not necessarily the largest component of the business. Outlets such as banquet halls also provide a source of revenue for these hotels.

== Calculation ==
$$TRevPAR = TotalRevenue /RoomsAvailable \,$$

- TRevPAR is total net revenue per available room
- Total Revenue is the net revenue generated by the hotel
- Rooms Available is the number of rooms available for sale in the time period.

== See also ==
- RevPAR
- GOPPAR
- Adjusted RevPAR
