= RevPAR =

Hotel performance metric

RevPAR, or revenue per available room, is a performance metric in the hotel industry that is calculated by dividing a hotel's total guestroom revenue by the room count and the number of days in the period being measured.

A few data broker companies compile RevPAR information across markets via voluntary survey and provide compiled blinded information back to the industry. The STAR report is one such widely used report, and is provided by STR.

== Caveats ==
Since RevPAR is a measurement for a particular period of time (say a day, or month or year) it is most often compared to the same time frame. It is often used in comparison to competitors within a custom defined market, trading area, or advertising region or a self-selected competitive set as defined by the hotel's owner or manager, which is referred to as RevPAR Index or RGI (Revenue Generating Index). Comparisons are usually most meaningful when made between hotels of the same type, or with similar target customers, as different hotel types may have different operational costs and customer expectations.

Other caveats:

- Successful RevPAR numbers differ from market to market based on demand and other factors.
- Best compared across like time periods. For example, it is proper to compare RevPAR on a Friday only versus other Fridays.
- Best compared across similar seasonal time periods. For example, comparing results from the Christmas week with the same a year previous is more credible than with a non-holiday week.

== Calculation ==
$$\operatorname{RevPAR} = \frac\operatorname{Rooms Revenue}\operatorname{Rooms Available} \,$$

- RevPAR is revenue per available room.
- Rooms Revenue is the revenue generated by room rentals.
- Rooms Available is the total number of room rentals available in the time period. If all rooms of a hotel are available for the entire time period, then Rooms Available is the product of the number of rooms in the hotel and the number of days in the time period.

== Other metrics ==
TRevPAR (Total Revenue Per Available Room) is another closely related performance metric in the hotel industry. It is calculated by dividing total hotel revenue (instead of guestroom revenue) by available rooms.

== See also ==
- GOPPAR
- Average daily rate
