= Catholic Church in Cambodia =

The Sanctuaire Marie Reine de la Paix Areyksat in Phnom Penh

The Catholic Church in Cambodia is part of the worldwide Catholic Church, under the spiritual leadership of the Pope in Rome. Throughout the Church's history in Cambodia, Catholics made up a small percentage of the country's population, and a majority of adherents have been ethnically Vietnamese; in 2005, around two-thirds of the total number of Catholics in Cambodia were Vietnamese.

The Church in Cambodia was slow to develop during the 20th century, with the first native Cambodian priest being ordained in 1957, and was nearly destroyed by the Khmer Rouge's severe communist rule which banned the practice of religion. Beginning in the 1990s, the institution was gradually rebuilt with the reestablishment of a major seminary and the first ordination of a native priest in decades.

== History ==
=== Early presence ===
The first known Christian mission in Cambodia was undertaken by Gaspar da Cruz, a Portuguese member of the Dominican Order, in 1555–1556. According to his own account, the enterprise was a complete failure; he found the country run by a "Bramene" king and "Bramene" officials, and discovered that "the Bramenes are the most difficult people to convert". He felt that no one would dare to convert without the King's permission, and left the country in disappointment, not having "baptized more than one gentile whom I left in the grave". Despite the French colonization in the 19th century, Christianity made little impact in the country.

=== Gradual growth and near eradication by the Khmer Rouge ===
The Cathedral of Our Lady of the Assumption in Battambang was destroyed by the Khmer Rouge.

Protestant missionary Arthur L. Hammond wrote and published the first Khmer-language translation of the New Testament in 1934, and finished his translation of the entire Bible by 1940, though the latter would only be published by 1954.

The first native Cambodian priest, Simon Chhem Yen, was ordained on November 7, 1957, followed by Paul Tep Im Sotha and Joseph Chhmar Salas in 1959 and 1964 respectively. According to Vatican statistics, in 1953, members of the Catholic Church in Cambodia numbered 120,000, making it at the time, the second largest religion, estimates indicate that about 50,000 Catholics were Vietnamese. Before the repatriation of the Vietnamese in 1970 and 1971, possibly as many as 62,000 Christians lived in Cambodia.

Large numbers of Vietnamese Catholics emigrated upon the start of Lon Nol's military junta (the Khmer Republic) in 1970, with Cambodia's major seminary closed indefinitely, though Catholics in general were tolerated by the government. In 1972 there were approximately about 20,000 Christians in Cambodia, most of whom were Catholics, and many of them were Europeans-chiefly French and Eurasians of French descent. From 1975 to 1979 however, the communist rule of the Khmer Rouge nearly eradicated Catholicism in the country; two-thirds of the remaining Catholics in Cambodia perished in forced labor camps, including Chhmar, while others were executed for indiscriminate reasons, such as Paul Tep Im Sotha.

=== Gradual revival ===
In 1989, the new constitution of the Vietnamese-occupied Cambodia allowed freedom of religion, although the preaching of Christianity was still forbidden by the Council of Ministers. In March 1990, the Cambodian government gave its approval for a group of Catholics to celebrate Easter Sunday, the first time Catholics in Cambodia worshipped in public in 15 years.

Efforts were made in 1990 to restart the seminary within the refugee camps of Khmer people in Thailand, and by next year the seminary was officially reinstated; teachings were delivered entirely in the Khmer language for the first time in the Church's history. In 1992, the seminary was transferred to Cambodia in the city of Battambang by four seminarians and Fr. Bernard Dupraz, the latter renting a private house for use. As the city lacked many items needed for the seminarians' training, they had to retrieve educational materials covertly provided in sacks by Fr. Francois Ponchaud and Sr. Gilberte Masson at the Thai border without alerting guards. On 25 July the same year, Yves Ramousse was appointed vicar apostolic of Phnom Penh, and by December was appointed apostolic administrator of Battambang.

Bishop Ramousse later recounted that Dupraz in 1993 managed to purchase the land previously occupied by the Battambang Parish before 1970, and had the responsibility of rebuilding the Church while being the lone priest in an area one-third the size of Cambodia. The seminarians had to act almost like vicars to Dupraz as they continued their training, being sent to remote areas of the country such as Serei Saophoan and Siem Reap to produce reports about their situations.

On March 25, 1994, Cambodia finalized its diplomatic relations with the Holy See. In July 1995, Pierre Sophal Tonlop became the first native Cambodian to be ordained a priest in more than 20 years. A new ecumenical Khmer translation of the Bible was published in June 1998, made to improve upon Hammond's more literal 1954 translation, and later in October, the seminary headed by Dupraz was moved to Phnom Penh and officially named the St. John Mary Vianney Major Seminary, as chosen by the seminarians. In 2001, the four original seminarians who remained since 1991, including Dominique Nget Viney and Pierre Suon Hangly, became the next natives after Sophal to become Catholic priests.

One incident of violence during the Church's revival was a grenade explosion at Banteay Prieb, a Jesuit school for the disabled, in Angk Snuol District, Kandal Province on October 17, 1996. A Cambodian student and former soldier named Soram threatened to throw a hand grenade to a class full of students after school staff informed him that he has been expelled due to his disruptive behavior. As Soram approached the classroom, 26-year-old Filipino Jesuit seminarian and missionary Richard "Richie" Fernando grabbed and restrained him to prevent his throwing the explosive, which caused Soram to accidentally drop the grenade and trigger it. Fernando died from the explosion, but Soram survived the blast as Fernando fell over to protect him. A television documentary film about Fernando's life titled Greater Love: In Memory of Richie Fernando, SJ was produced in 1999 by the Philippine-based Jesuit Communications Foundation.

=== Contemporary period ===
In June 2025, Pierre Suon Hangly was appointed Coadjutor Vicar Apostolic of Phnom Penh, becoming the first Cambodian to hold a top Church position in the country since Tep Im and Chhmar.

== Statistics and jurisdiction ==
Estimates for the actual number of Catholics in Cambodia has varied over the years. In 1994, UCA News stated that the population was thought to be around 25,000. Later in 2005, parish priest Bob Piche mentioned that the number was 25,000, indicating no change. According to Ramousse in 2015, there are around 20,000 Catholics in Cambodia, or 0.15% of the total population. Peter Ford of The Diplomat, however, wrote that the number has reached 75,000 by 2017.

There are no dioceses, but there are three territorial jurisdictions – one Apostolic Vicariate and two Apostolic Prefectures.

- Apostolic Vicariate of Phnom Penh
- Apostolic Prefecture of Battambang
- Apostolic Prefecture of Kompong Cham

== See also ==
- Religion in Cambodia
- Freedom of religion in Cambodia

== Bibliography ==
- Ponchaud, François (2012). The Cathedral in the Rice Paddy: The 450 Year Long History of the Church in Cambodia. Catholic Catechetical Centre Cambodia. ISBN 978-99963-13-08-0.
- Bučko, Ladislav; Rauschová, Elena; Tretiaková-Adamcová, Jana (2020). "The Search for a Current Mission Model in Cambodia". International Review of Mission. 109 (1): 27–39. doi:10.1111/irom.12307. ISSN 1758-6631. S2CID 219410925.
