= Apostolic Vicariate of Phnom Penh =

Catholic missionary jurisdiction in Cambodia

Apostolic Vicariate of Phnom Penh Vicariatus Apostolicus de Phnom-Penh សាវកជំនួសរាជធានីភ្នំពេញ

Catholic

Location
- Country: Cambodia
- Coordinates: 11°34′N 104°55′E

Statistics
- Area: 32,063 km^{2} (12,380 sq mi)
- Population: Total; Catholics: (as of 2022); 6,400,000 (Note: Annuario Pontificio (2023) via Catholic-Hierarchy.org); 12,000 (0.2%)
- Parishes: 10

Information
- Denomination: Catholic Church
- Sui iuris church: Latin Church
- Rite: Roman Rite
- Established: 30 August 1850 (As Vicariate Apostolic of Cambogia); 3 December 1924 (As Vicariate Apostolic of Phnom-Penh)
- Cathedral: Saint Joseph Parish
- Secular priests: 4 plus 41 religious priests

Current leadership
- Pope: Leo XIV
- Apostolic Vicar: Olivier Schmitthaeusler
- Coadjutor: Pierre Suon Hangly

Map
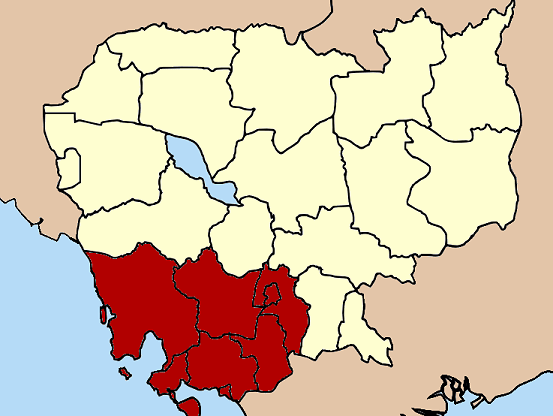

The Apostolic Vicariate of Phnom Penh (Khmer: សាវកជំនួសរាជធានីភ្នំពេញ) is a territorial subdivision of the Catholic Church in Cambodia. It is immediately subject to the Holy See and it is presided over by Bishop Olivier Schmitthaeusler M.E.P. since 10 October 2010.

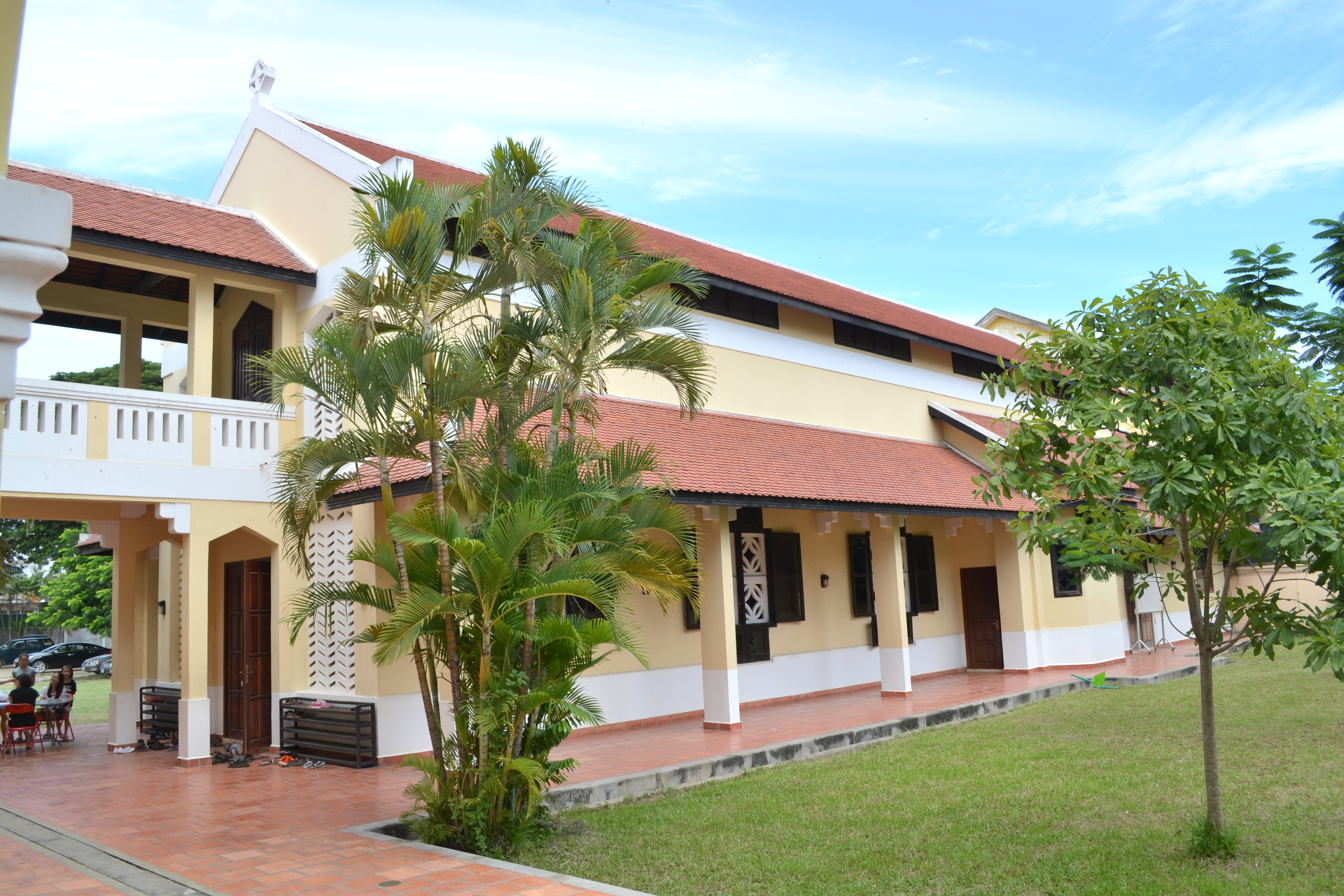
St. Joseph's Church, Phnom Penh

The vicariate covers an area of 32,063 km^{2} (12,380 sq mi) of southern Cambodia, including Phnom Penh and other main urban areas such as Kep, Sihanoukville, Kandal, Takéo, Kampot, Kampong Speu and Koh Kong provinces. As of 2002, of the 4.4 million citizens living in the area of this prefecture, 13,250 were members of the Catholic Church. The vicariate is subdivided into 7 pastoral centers, and has 26 priests.

== History ==
The Vicariate Apostolic of Cambodia was erected on 30 August 1850. Since 1860 it was responsible for the provinces Phsar Dek, Châu Đốc and Sóc Trăng of lower Cambodia, now part of Vietnam. In 1924, it was renamed as Vicariate Apostolic of Phnom Penh. On 20 September 1955, the vicariate became responsible for all of Cambodia. In 1968, the vicariate was split into three parts, with the Apostolic Prefecture of Battambang responsible for the north west and the Apostolic Prefecture of Kompong Cham for the north east of the country.

During the rule of the Khmer Rouge, all religious activities were forbidden, and many Catholics were persecuted, especially priests and other ordinaries. Also many Vietnamese Catholics, the majority of Catholics in Cambodia, were either executed or expelled from the country. Most churches were also destroyed. The number of Catholics in the area of the vicariate fell from about 30,000 to less than 10,000. In 1989, the new constitution of Cambodia allowed freedom of religion once again, although the preaching of Christianity was still forbidden by the Council of Ministers. In March 1990, the Cambodian government gave its approval for a group of Catholics to celebrate Easter Sunday, the first public worship in Cambodia in 15 years.

On 24 December 2009 the French priest Olivier Schmitthaeusler, M.E.P. was named Coadjutor Vicar Apostolic of Phnom-Penh and Titular Bishop of Catabum Castra. He succeeded to bishop Destombes on 1 October 2010.

On 1 May 2015 the Cambodian Catholic Church opened an official diocesan inquiry for the martyrs in Tangkok, Kampong Thom Province, where Bishop Joseph Chhmar Salas died during the Khmer Rouge regime in 1977. The inquiry looks after the presumed martyrdom of at least 34 persons executed or let to die from April 1975 to 1978.

== Bishops ==
=== Ordinaries ===
- Jean-Claude Miche, M.E.P.: 1850 – 1869 (resigned)
- Marie-Laurent Cordier, M.E.P.: 18 June 1882 – 14 August 1895 (died)
- Jean-Baptiste Grosgeorge, M.E.P. 28 January 1896 – 1 March 1902 (died)
- Jean-Claude Bouchut, M.E.P.: 23 July 1902 – 17 December 1928 (died)
- Valentin Herrgott, M.E.P. 17 December 1928 – 23 March 1936 (died)
- Jean-Baptiste-Maximilien Chabalier, M.E.P.: 2 December 1937 – 11 June 1955 (died)
- Gustave Raballand, M.E.P.: 29 February 1956 – April 1962 (resigned)
- Yves Ramousse, M.E.P.: 12 November 1962 – 1976 (resigned)
- Joseph Chhmar Salas: 30 April 1976 – September 1977 (killed)
- Yves Ramousse, M.E.P.: 25 July 1992 – 14 April 2001 (resigned)
- Emile Destombes, M.E.P.: 14 April 2001 – 1 October 2010 (resigned)
- Olivier Schmitthaeusler, M.E.P.: 1 October 2010

=== Coadjutor Vicars Apostolic ===
- Émile Jean Marie Henri Joseph Destombes, M.E.P. (1997–2001)
- Olivier Michel Marie Schmitthaeusler, M.E.P. (2009–2010)
- Pierre Suon Hangly (since 2025)

== See also ==
- Catholic Church in Cambodia
- Chong Khneas Catholic Church
- Freedom of religion in Cambodia
- List of cathedrals in Cambodia
- List of Catholic dioceses in Laos and Cambodia
- Notre Dame Cathedral of Phnom Penh
- Religion in Cambodia
