= Emile Destombes =

French Roman Catholic bishop

Émile Destombes MEP
- Vicar Apostolic of Phnom Penh
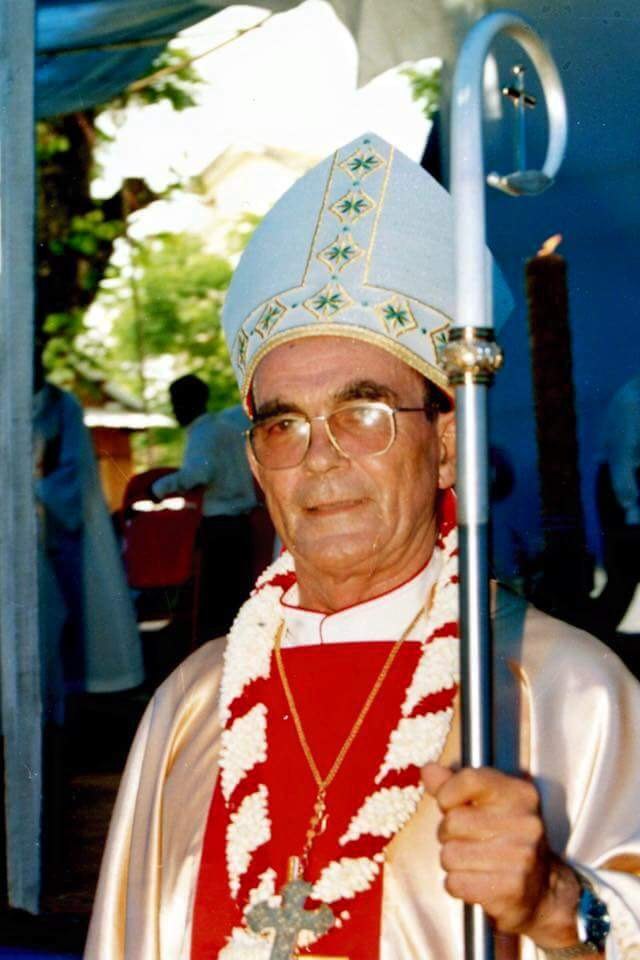
- Destombes in 1997
- Church: Catholic Church
- See: Apostolic Vicariate of Phnom Penh
- In office: 14 April 2001 – 1 October 2010
- Predecessor: Yves Ramousse
- Successor: Olivier Schmitthaeusler
- Other post: Titular Bishop of Altava (1997-2016)
- Previous post: Coadjutor Vicar Apostolic of Phnom Penh (1997-2001)

Orders
- Ordination: 21 December 1961
- Consecration: 5 October 1997 by Yves Ramousse

Personal details
- Born: 15 August 1935 Roncq, Nord, France
- Died: 28 January 2016 (aged 80)

Emile Jean Marie Henri Joseph Destombe (15 August 1935 – 28 January 2016) was a French Roman Catholic bishop. He was a member of the Société des Missions Étrangères de Paris (Paris Mission Society).

== Biography ==
Born in Roncq, France, Emile Destombes was ordained to the priesthood in 1961. In 1997, Emile Destombes was appointed coadjutor vicar apostolic of Phnom Penh, Cambodia and succeeded in 2001 retiring in 2010.
