= Gustave Raballand =

French Roman Catholic prelate (1901–1973)

His Excellency Gustave Raballand
- Vicar Apostolic of Phnom Penh
- Installed: 29 February 1956
- Term ended: April 1962
- Predecessor: Jean-Baptiste-Maximilien Chabalier, M.E.P.
- Successor: Yves Ramousse

Orders
- Ordination: 6 June 1925
- Consecration: 1 May 1956 by Pope Pius XII

Personal details
- Born: 30 October 1901 Le Perrier
- Died: 13 January 1973 (aged 71) Montbeton

Gustave Raballand (30 October 1901 – 13 January 1973) was a French Roman Catholic prelate. He was titular bishop of Eguga from 1956 until his death and vicar apostolic of Phnom Penh from 1956 to 1962 when he resigned. He died on 13 January 1973 at the age of 71.

Catholic Church titles
Preceded by Jean-Baptiste-Maximilien Chabalier, M.E.P.	Vicar Apostolic of Phnom Penh; 1956–1962	Succeeded by Yves Ramousse, M.E.P.
Preceded by Louis-Amédée Lefèvre	Titular Bishop of Eguga; 1956–1973	Succeeded by Antonius Hubert Thijssen
