= Pierre Sophal Tonlop =

Cambodian Roman Catholic priest (born 1953)

The Reverend Pierre Sophal Tonlop
- Church: Roman Catholic Church
- Province: Battambang
- See: Battambang

Orders
- Ordination: 22 July 1995

Personal details
- Born: 1953 (age 72–73) Phnom Penh

Pierre Sophal Tonlop (Khmer: ទម្លាប់ សុផល; born 1953) is a Cambodian Catholic priest best known as the first native of Cambodia to be ordained a priest after the fall of the Khmer Rouge in 1979; he was ordained on 22 July 1995 and assigned to the Apostolic Prefecture of Battambang.

== Biography ==
Tonlop was a resident of Canada from 1984 to 1990, during which he studied at the Grand Séminaire de Montréal (Major Seminary of Montreal). From 1990 to 1993, he continued his studies in France. By 1994, after his ordination as a deacon, he volunteered to become a missionary in Cambodia for a return to his native country, where he later became a priest the year after.

As of 2012, he is Battambang's Vicar Delegate in charge of caring for Vietnamese Catholic communities in the country, alongside heading the Rice Bank of the Church.

== See also ==
- Dominique Nget Viney, one of the next four native Cambodians to become a priest in 2001 after Tonlop
