= Joseph Chhmar Salas =

Catholic bishop

Servant of God Joseph Chhmar Salas
- Vicar Apostolic of Phnom Penh
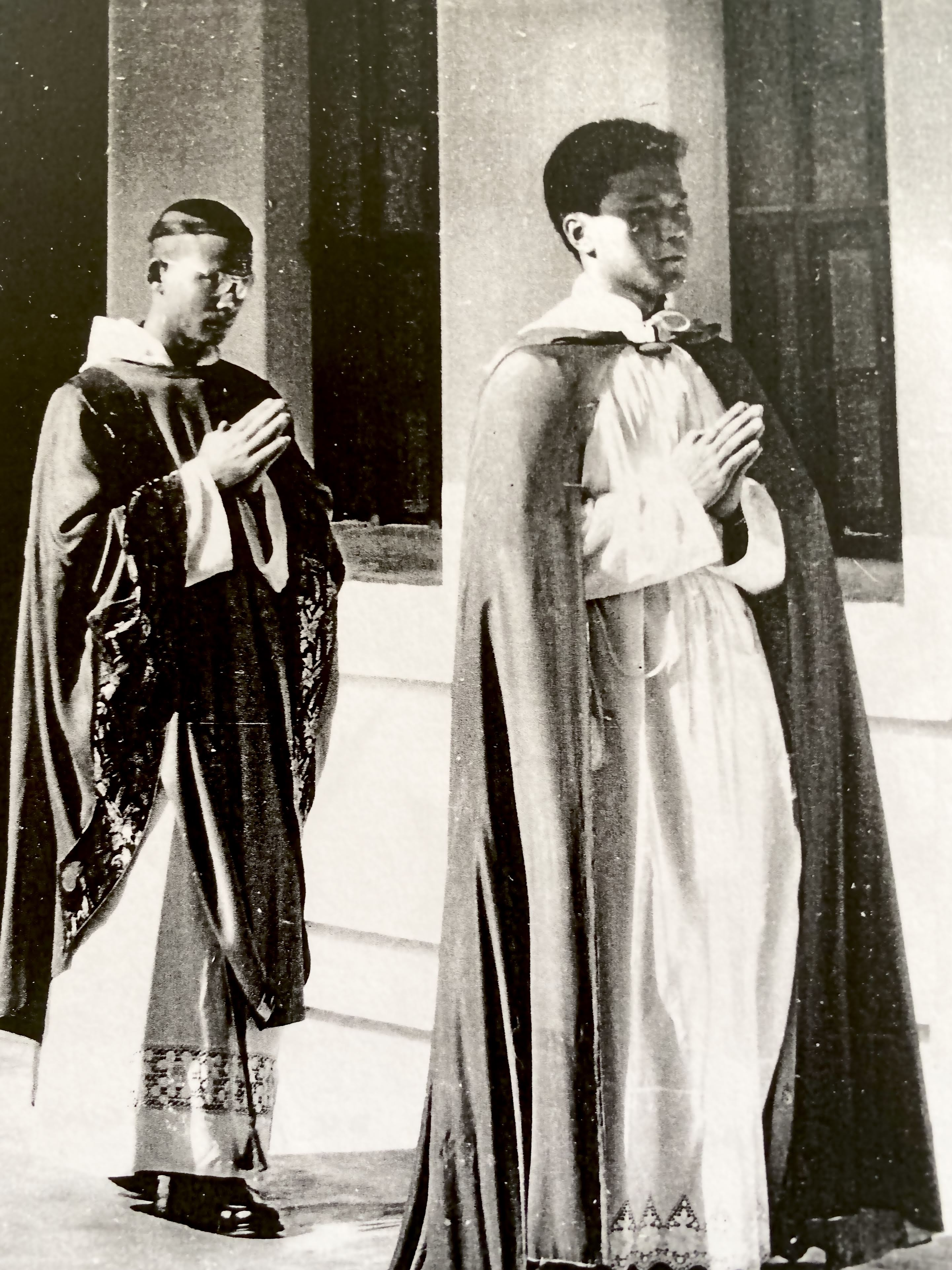
- The then-Father Salas on 17 November 1968.
- Church: Roman Catholic Church
- See: Phnom Penh
- Appointed: 30 April 1976
- Term ended: September 1977
- Predecessor: Yves Ramousse
- Successor: Yves Ramousse
- Previous posts: Coadjutor Vicar Apostolic of Phnom Penh (1975-76); Titular Bishop of Sigus (1975-76)

Orders
- Ordination: 24 June 1964 by Yves-Marie Georges René Ramousse
- Consecration: 14 April 1975 by Yves-Marie Georges René Ramousse

Personal details
- Born: 21 October 1937 Moat Krasas Phnom Penh, French Cambodia
- Died: September 1977 (aged 39) Taing Kok, Kompong Thom, Democratic Kampuchea

Joseph Chhmar Salas (Khmer: យ៉ូសែប ឆ្មារសាឡាស់) 21 October 1937 – September 1977) was a prelate of the Catholic Church who served as bishop Apostolic Vicariate of Phnom Penh in Cambodia from 1975 to 1977, when he died of exhaustion in a forced work camp of the Khmer Rouge. He was among the first native Cambodians to become a Catholic priest and the first to become bishop.

== Life ==
Early life and education

Salas was born in Phnom Penh on 21 October 1937. He was born into a Traditional Catholic family. His parents were originally from the parish of Moat Krasas Salas was the 3rd eldest of his siblings. He had a younger sister, Yu Chhmar Prakod (also spelt You Prakort), and a younger brother, Joseph Chhmar Salem, who was also a Catholic priest. He studied in a minor seminary in Phnom Penh; afterwards, he continued his studies at a major seminary named "Issy-les-Moulineaux" in France in October 1959 for his formation as a priest.

Priesthood

Salas was ordained a deacon at the Saint-Sulpice Chapel in Issy-les-Moulineaux on 2 February 1964. He was ordained a priest on 24 June 1964 by Bishop Yves Ramousse at the Notre-Dame Cathedral of Phnom Penh, becoming one of the first native Cambodians, alongside Simon Chhem Yen and Paul Tep Im Sotha, to become a Catholic priest. Following his ordination, Salas was assigned to the Apostolic Prefecture of Battambang.

In 1965, he and Father Raymond Coueron established a school of catechists in Battambang for the young Khmer boys to include periods of instruction in catechetical pedagogy and ethics, alternating this in-class training with practicums in parishes. They began a cycle of training with four young Khmers and the continued with six others the following year.

In 1974, he returned to Paris, France, to pursue advanced theological and biblical studies.

Episcopal ministry and Khmer Rouge era

In March 1975, amid the escalation of the Cambodian Civil War, A meeting of the Presbyterium of march was held by Bishop Yves Ramousse, each priest was asked to give his opinion on recalling Salas who was on a sabbatical year in France. The members of the Presbyterium replied favorably. In addition to his return was the problem of naming a Cambodian Bishop in Phnom Penh.

Sensing that he would have to leave his beloved community and knowing that foreigners would be inevitably neutralized by the church, he summoned Salas back to Cambodia urgently. Anticipating that all foreign clergy would be expelled if the Khmer Rouge seized power sooner. Ramousse sought to establish native leadership for the local Church.

Salas readily obeyed and returned to his country as soon as he received the telegram from his bishop. Salas knew that his return at this time meant accepting all the most difficult consequences that would befall him. Upon his departure from the seminary of the Paris Foreign Missions, he made no illusions about his future. He guessed that the Holy See wanted to confer on him the Episcopal charge at this difficult time. Salas confided to his French friends said: "I am leaving for Cambodia to die."

During this turbulent period, Bishop Ramousse secretly consecrated Salas on April 6, before the official Papal Bull of the Holy See arrived on Monday April 7 1975.

On 14 April 1975, the Holy See appointed Salas as Coadjutor Bishop for the Apostolic Vicariate of Phnom Penh in the church of Preah Meada. During his ordination, there was two rockets fell near the church, said by his sister Prakod. He was ordained 3 days before the Khmer rouge seized Phnom Penh.

On April 17, 1975, the Khmer Rouge took power in Cambodia. They founded a Communist state with the name of Democratic Kampuchea, where any religion was forbidden, and the destruction of religious sites was frequent. Catholics and non-Catholics were forced out of the town and cities.

During this, His brother, Father Joseph Chhmar Salem, Father Marcel Troeung Chamroeun and Bishop Salas left the parish to seek refuge at the Bishop's house, to await passage of the outrageous deportation. But on the morning of the 18th April, they had face and realize that the order was merciless for everyone without distinction. They said their moving farewells to the French priests and The Bishop Yves Ramousse with discretion of all Khmers who veil their emotions, then they left with their meager personal effects. the last plea of Bishop Salas to them was "Do not Forget! Speak to the world about us!".

In May 1975, foreigners were expelled, including Catholic priests and religious, while natives were forced to work in rice fields, and many of them were executed. Bishop Ramousse was expelled from the country with many other foreign priests and other religious figures. Most Cambodian priests and religious figures remained in the country; very few would survive.

In 1976, Bishop Ramousse resigned as head of the Cambodian Church. Salas became the head bishop in Kompong Thom. He died of exhaustion and hunger from forced labor and severe mental persecution, in September 1977 in the Taing Kork Pagoda.

On 1 May 2015, the Cambodian Catholic Church officially opened an inquiry into the presumed martyrdom of Joseph Chhmar Salas and another 33 persons who died during the time of the Khmer Rouge regime.

Catholic Church titles
Preceded by Yves Ramousse	Bishop of Phnom Penh; 1976–1977	Succeeded by Yves Ramousse
