= Our Lady of the Assumption Cathedral, Battambang =

Cathedral of Battambang Cathédrale de Battambang
- Cathedral of Our Lady of the Assumption; Cathédrale de Notre Dame de l'Assomption
- Cathedral of Battambang; Cathédrale de Battambang
- Location: Battambang
- Country: Cambodia
- Denomination: Roman Catholic

History
- Status: Cathedral

Architecture
- Functional status: Destroyed
- Completed: 1929
- Demolished: 1975

Administration
- Diocese: Battambang

The Cathedral of Battambang (Khmer: ក្រុងបាត់ដំបងវិហារ; French: Cathédrale de Battambang), or Cathedral of Our Lady of the Assumption (French: Cathédrale de Notre Dame de l'Assomption), was a Roman Catholic cathedral in Battambang, Cambodia. It was completed in 1929 and was destroyed in 1975 by the Khmer Rouge.

== See also ==
- List of cathedrals in Cambodia
- Khmer Rouge rule of Cambodia
