= Enrique Figaredo Alvargonzalez =

Enrique Figaredo Alvargonzalez SJ
- Prefect of Battambang
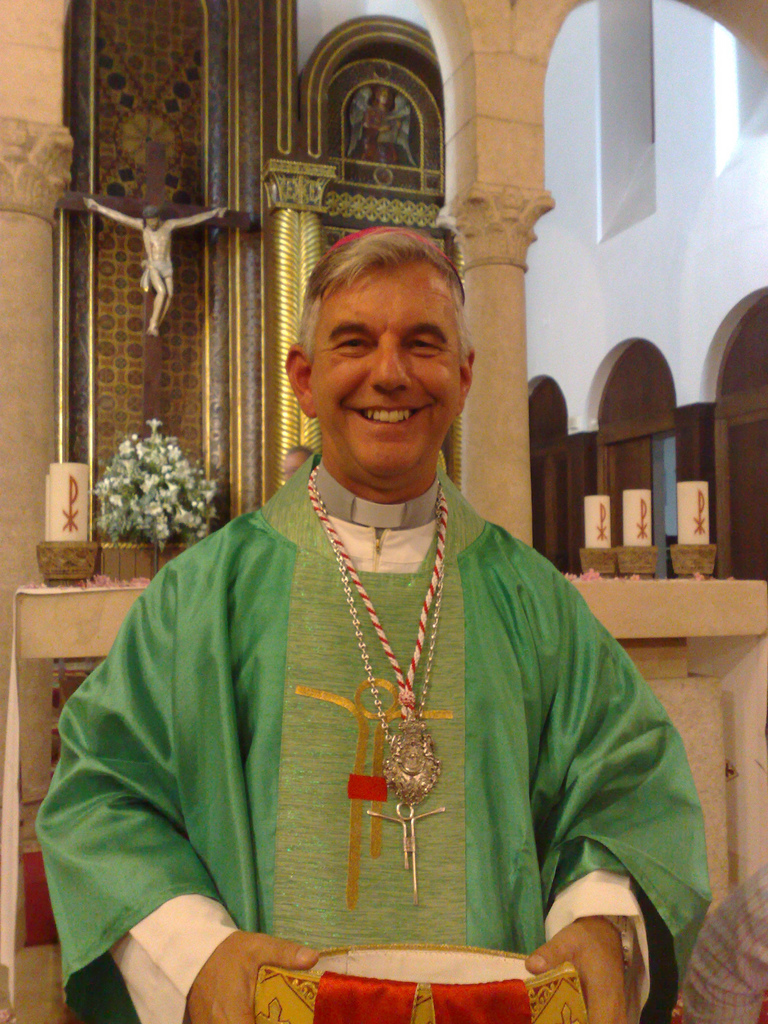
- Native name: Enrique Figareo Alvargonzález
- Church: Catholic Church
- See: Apostolic Prefecture of Battambang
- Appointed: 1 April 2000
- Predecessor: Paul Tep Im Sotha

Orders
- Ordination: 4 July 1992

Personal details
- Born: 21 September 1959 (age 66) Gijón, Province of Oviedo, Spanish State

Enrique Figaredo (born 21 September 1959) is a Jesuit priest and the Apostolic Prefect of Battambang, known as the Bishop of the Wheelchairs for his humanitarian assistance in Cambodia.

== Family ==
Born to Alberto Figaredo, a member of an important industrialist family in the north of Spain, and Ana María Alvargonzález. Enrique was the seventh of eight children. He is the cousin of the Spanish politician Rodrigo Rato Figaredo.

== Education ==
Enrique attended the Jesuit's School in Gijón, Colegio de la Inmaculada, and graduated in 1976. On 15 October 1979, he joined the Jesuit Novitiate. He has a degree in economics, Theology and Philosophy.

In 1985, during his university studies, he volunteered for the Jesuit Refugee Service (JRS) and was sent to a Cambodian refugee camp in Thailand. He returned to Spain to finish his studies and to be ordained as a Jesuit priest in 1992, but then immediately went back to Cambodia.

== Humanitarian Assistance ==
First in Thailand and later in Cambodia, Figaredo has dedicated his life to help people with disabilities, initially those maimed by landmines. He also cooperates with the International Campaign to Ban Landmines, which was awarded the Peace Nobel Prize. Figaredo has launched many initiatives to raise funds and help these victims.

In 1991, in Phnom Penh, he founded Banteay Prieb ("The Dove House") where children maimed by landmines receive education and people with disabilities can make wheelchairs following the Mekong model (a wooden wheelchair with three wheels).

In Battambang he founded the "Arrupe Center" and promoted development all over the diocese with projects in education, vocational training for adults, infrastructure and relief aid.

Figaredo still takes part in Cambodia's development by means of different NGOs and at present takes part in the Ban Cluster Bomb Campaign.

=== Dance Tours ===
Dance tours have been an initiative fostered by Figaredo in order to promote Cambodia, its culture and its reality. It is also a means of raising funds for the aid and development projects in Cambodia. Up to date there have been three dance tours in the years 2000, 2005 and 2008.

==== 2008: Cambodia Within Reach ====
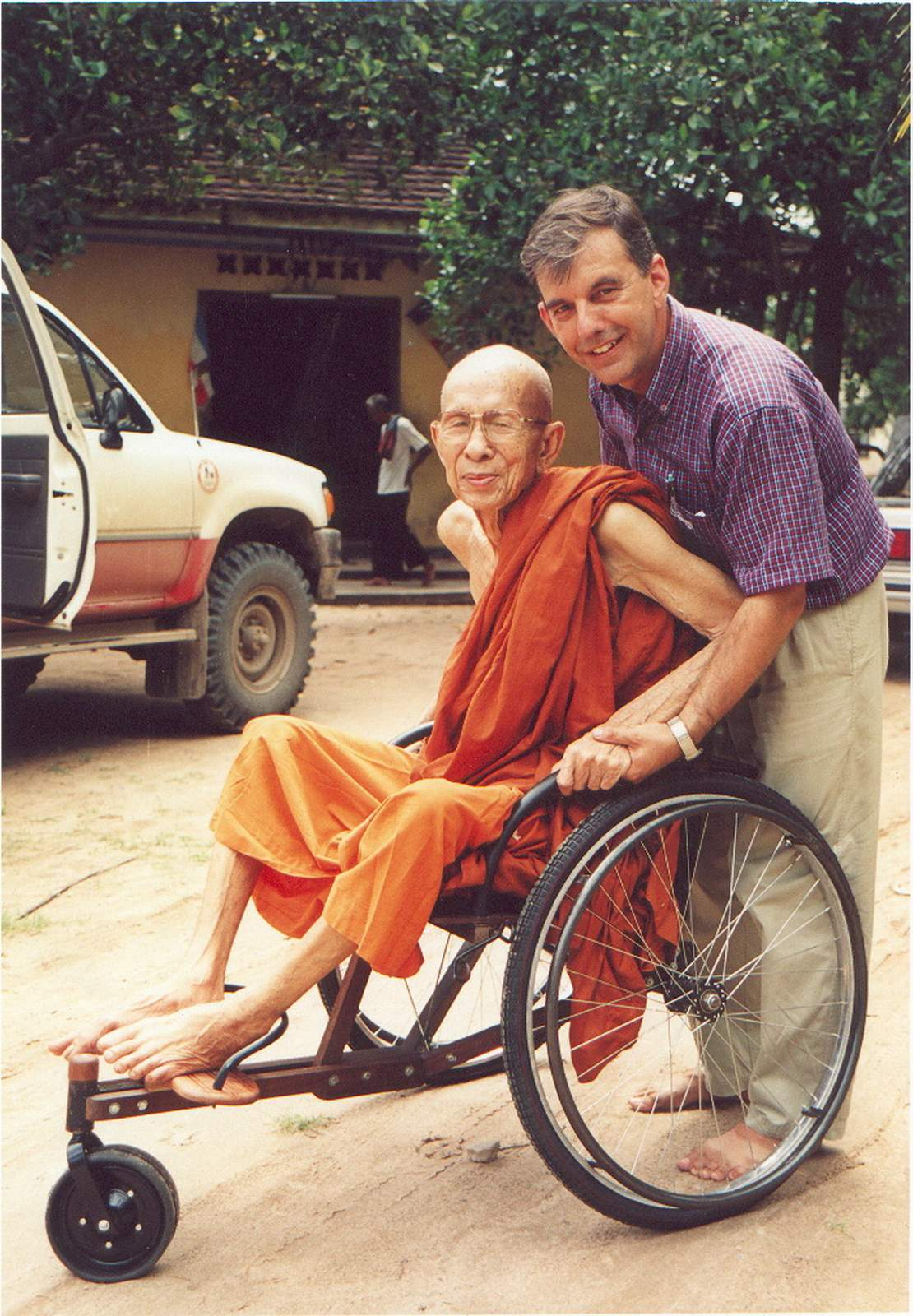
Monsignor Figaredo and a Buddhist monk in Phnom Penh, Cambodia

"Cambodia Within Reach" was the slogan adopted for the 2008 dance tour, in which "Tahen’s Dance Group" travelled throughout Spain for 6 weeks in September and October 2008. Tahen's Dance Group is made up of 65 members and divides in 4 smaller groups. One group is made up of 14 dancers between 14 and 17 years old, another with 18 dancers between 18 and 20. A third group has 15 dancers from the Arrupe Centre for people with disabilities (maimed by landmines and cluster bombs or who suffer from poliomyelitis). The last group is that made up of 10 musicians and 3 people for management and assistance.

Each performance included 6 or 7 traditional dances. In "The Blessing Dance" 7 dancers dressed up as apsaras (celestial nymphs) bless and thank the audience with delicate movements and flowers. The walls of the Angkor Watt hold evidence of the origins of this traditional dance in its reliefs. "The Coconut Dance", "The Fish Dance" and "The Harvest Dance" reflect Cambodia's traditions and everyday life. These are some of the dances of the 20 piece repertory of Tahen's Dance Group.

The group held 17 performances in 12 different Spanish cities: Madrid, Valladolid, Gijón, Oviedo, Alicante, Barcelona, Zaragoza, Córdoba, Seville and Badajoz.

== Prizes and awards ==
Alvargonzalez has received numerous prizes and awards for his humanitarian work in Cambodia. These include the Grand Cross of Civil Order of Social Solidarity, awarded by the Spanish government and the Golden Amuravela, a prize granted every year by the Friends of Cudillero Association.
