= Chong Khneas Catholic Church =

Floating church in Cambodia

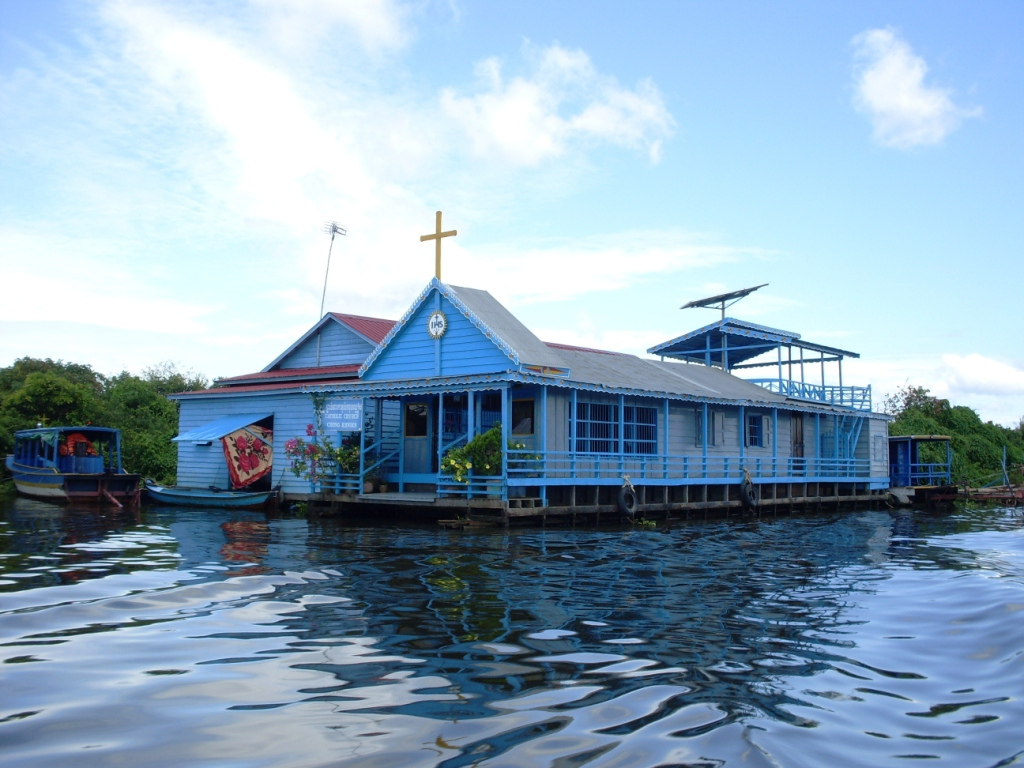
Chong Khneas Catholic Church

Chong Khneas Catholic Church or St. Paul’s Church of Chong Khnies is a Roman Catholic church in Cambodia. It is a floating church, lying on the Tonle Sap lake.

== See also ==
- Cathedral of Phnom Penh
- St. Joseph's Church, Phnom Penh
