= Yves Ramousse =

French prelate of the Catholic Church (1928–2021)

His Grace, The Most Reverend Yves Ramousse
- Apostolic Vicar of Phnom Penh
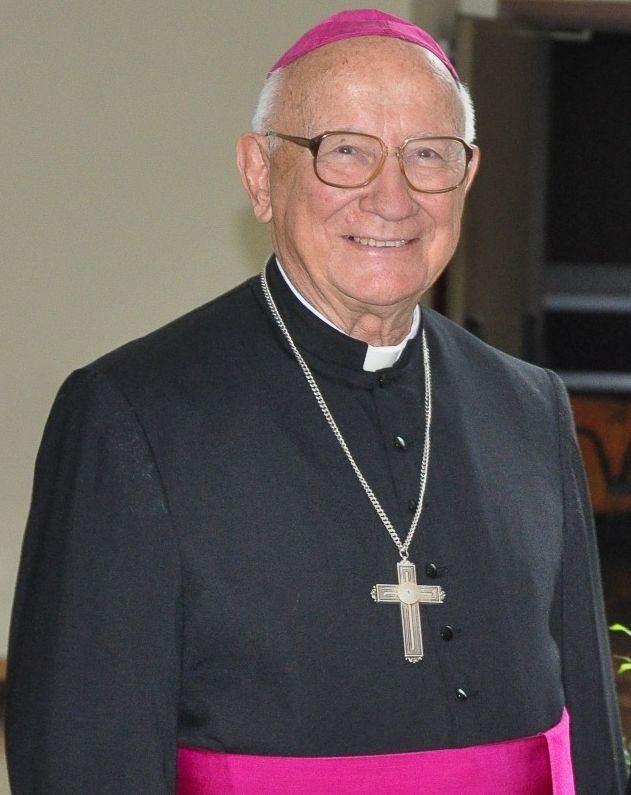
- Yves Ramousse coming back to Cambodia in 1992
- Archdiocese: Phnom Penh
- See: Cambodia
- Appointed: 12 November 1962
- Predecessor: Joseph Chhmar Salas
- Other post: Apostolic Prefect of Battambang (1992-2000)

Orders
- Ordination: 4 April 1953
- Consecration: 24 April 1963 by Gustave Raballand, apostolic vicar of Phnom Penh; Henri Pinault, bishop of Chengdu; Jean-Pierre Dozolme, bishop of Puy-en-Velay

Personal details
- Born: Yves-Georges-René Ramousse; 23 February 1928 Sembadel, France
- Died: 25 February 2021 (aged 93) Montauban, France
- Denomination: Roman Catholicism
- Education: Pontifical French Seminary
- Alma mater: Pontifical Gregorian University
- Coat of arms

Yves Ramousse (23 February 1928 – 25 February 2021, in Montauban) was a French Catholic bishop, member of the Paris Foreign Missions Society (MEP) and Vicar Apostolic Emeritus of Phnom Penh in Cambodia since 2001.

== Biography ==
Yves Ramousse was ordained a priest on 4 April 1953 for the Foreign Missions of Paris and in 1957 he was sent for the mission to Cambodia.

Appointed vicar apostolic of Phnom Penh in Cambodia on 12 November 1962 with the title of bishop in partibus of Pisita, he was consecrated on 24 February 1963 by his predecessor, at the age of 35 making him the youngest bishop in the world at that time.

He participated in Sessions 2, 3 and 4 of Vatican Council II, of which he was one of the youngest participants.

=== Khmer genocide ===
As the political situation decayed in Cambodia, Ramousse tried his best to promote initiatives of peace and reconciliation in line with the encyclical Pacem in Terris of Pope John XXIII and initiatives of Pope Paul VI in the wake of the Cold War. However, he was accused of being incapable of making any decisions, though the aftermath shows how complicated the situation actually was. Following the Cambodian civil war, he resigned from his duties on 30 April 1976 in favor of a Khmer priest Joseph Chhmar Salas whom he secretly ordained bishop in Phnom Penh shortly before the expulsion of Western nationals by the Khmer Rouge. Salas, who was the first native Khmer bishop, would shortly after die a martyr in the killing fields of Pol Pot. With many others after the Khmer Rouge had entered Phnom Penh, Ramousse was locked up at the French Embassy for 12 days before being expelled from Cambodia along with all foreign nationals. He took refuge in Indonesia and obtained on 6 January 1983 from the Congregation for the evangelization of peoples the creation of an Office for the promotion of the apostolate among the Khmer people of which he became the first director.

== Later years ==
On 21 February 1992, Ramousse was granted an audience by King Sihanouk in which he was encouraged to develop the work of the Catholic Church in Cambodia. He was again appointed vicar apostolic of Phnom-Penh on 6 July 1992 by Pope John Paul II following the appeasement of the conflict and the return of some missionary priests to Cambodia in 1990. He also assumed the mission of apostolic administrator of the Battambang Apostolic Prefecture, until the appointment of Archbishop Enrique Figaredo Alvargonzález on 1 April 2000. He led the Church of Cambodia through its resurrection, after years of persecution, but many considered him tired and used out by his many trials. His missionary efforts in favour of the Church and the people of Cambodia were acknowledged by Pope John Paul II during his ad limina visit in Rome on 11 February 1999.

=== Resignation and retirement ===
He resigned for reasons of age on 14 April 2001, giving way to another French bishop of the Foreign Missions of Paris, Emile Destombes, his coadjutor since 1997.

He retired to France, living at the retirement home of the Paris Foreign Missions Society in Montbeton until his death.

== Death ==
Ramousse died from COVID-19 at the Montauban hospital during the COVID-19 pandemic in France, two days after his 93rd birthday.

At the time of his death, there were 25,000 Catholics in Cambodia (0.16% of the population).
