= Paul Tep Im Sotha =

Cambodian Catholic priest and martyr (1934–1975)

- Apostolic Prefect of Battambang
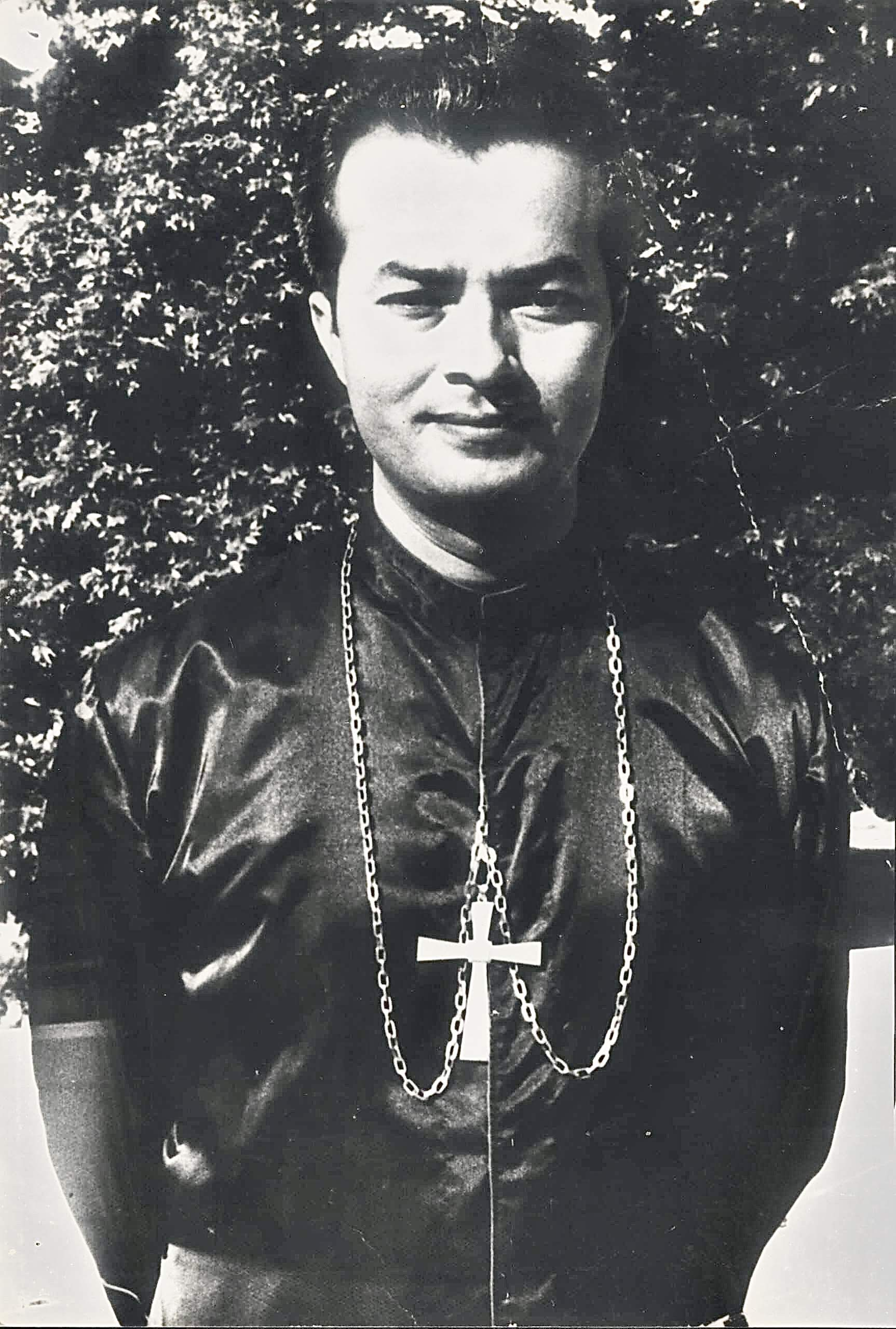
- Church: Roman Catholic Church
- Province: Battambang
- See: Battambang
- In office: 1968—1975
- Successor: Enrique Figaredo Alvargonzalez

Orders
- Ordination: 1959
- Consecration: September 26, 1968

Personal details
- Born: 1934
- Died: May 1975 (aged 40–41) Battambang Province, Kampuchea

Paul Tep Im Sotha Samath (Khmer: ទេព អ៊ីមសុត្ថា; 1934–May 1975) was a Cambodian Roman Catholic priest who was killed in the Cambodian genocide. Ordained in 1959, he was the first apostolic prefect of Battambang and the second native Cambodian to become a Catholic priest after Simon Chhem Yen.

Tep Im was raised as a Catholic by his mother, and from a young age was sent to various schools abroad, such as in Vietnam, France, and Italy. After his ordination at the Notre-Dame de Paris, Tep Im took further theological studies in Rome. However, growing concerns for his country's issues as well as a decisive conversation with American bishop Fulton Sheen led him to decide against a monastic life and return to Cambodia by August 1962. Upon the establishment of the Apostolic Prefecture of Battambang, Tep Im was installed as its apostolic prefect on September 26, 1968, a position he remained in up to his death under the Khmer Rouge regime in early May 1975.

Tep Im has been described by historian Milton Osborne as a priest with remarkable understanding of both the Catholic faith and Cambodian society. A boarding house for secondary and tertiary-level students in Battambang was named after him. In June 2015, the Catholic Church officially opened an inquiry into Tep Im's presumed martyrdom, alongside others such as Joseph Chhmar Salas who died during the Cambodian genocide.

== Gallery ==
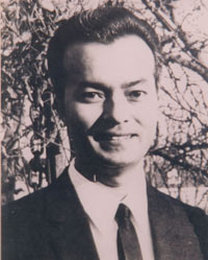
Portrait photograph of Im Sotha

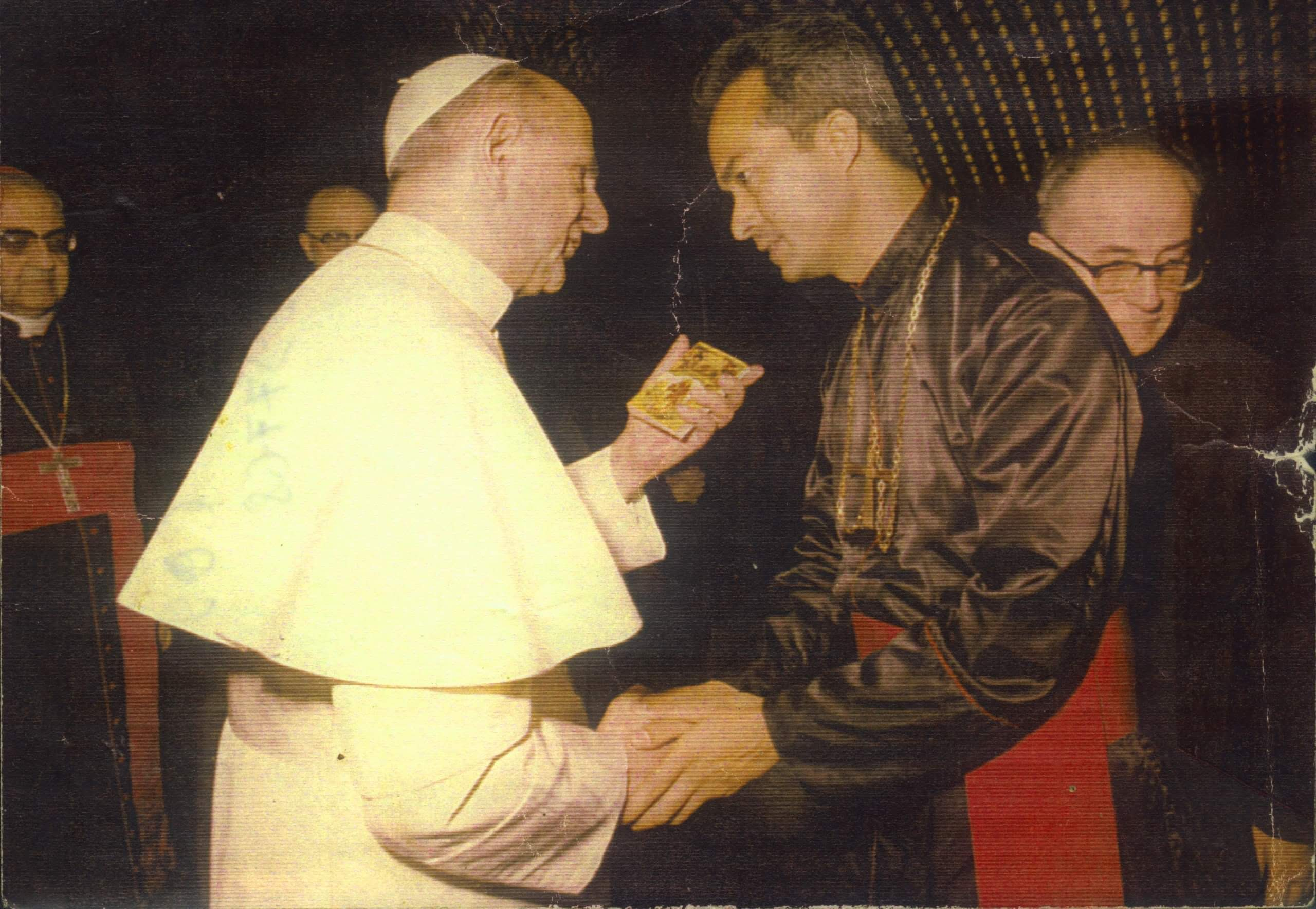
Tep Im (right) with Pope Paul VI (left) in 1975
