= Apostolic Prefecture of Kampong Cham =

Catholic missionary jurisdiction in Cambodia

Apostolic Prefecture of Kampong Cham Praefectura Apostolica Kampongchamensis ភូមិភាគកំពង់ចាម

catholic

Location
- Country: Cambodia

Statistics
- Area: 66,347 km^{2} (25,617 sq mi)
- Population: Total; Catholics: (as of 2010); 5,400,000; 3,600 (0.1%)

Information
- Denomination: Roman Catholic
- Sui iuris church: Latin Church
- Rite: Latin Rite
- Established: 26 September 1968

Current leadership
- Apostolic Prefect: Vacant
- Bishops emeritus: Antonysamy Susairaj, M.E.P.

Map
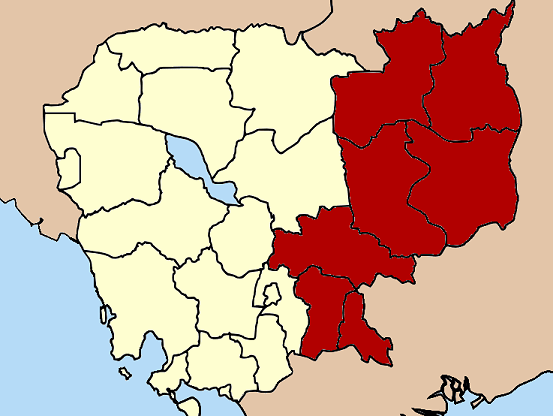

The Apostolic Prefecture of Kampong Cham is a territorial subdivision of the Roman Catholic Church in Cambodia.

The prefecture covers an area of 66,347 km^{2} of eastern Cambodia, covering the provinces of Kampong Cham, Kratié, Stung Treng, Ratanakiri, Mondulkiri, Svay Rieng, Tboung Khmum and Prey Veng. As of 2002, of the 4.2 million citizen 3,460 are member of the Catholic Church. The prefecture is subdivided into 24 parishes, and has 13 priests altogether.

== History ==
The prefecture was erected on September 26, 1968, when the Apostolic Vicariate of Phnom Penh (which was until then responsible for all of Cambodia) was split into three parts.

== Ordinaries ==
- André Lesouëf, M.E.P.: September 26, 1968 – 1997 (retired)
- Antonysamy Susairaj, M.E.P.: May 27, 2000 – July 25, 2019 (resigned)
- Pierre Suon Hangly: July 15, 2022 – June 28, 2025 (transferred)

== See also ==
- List of Catholic dioceses in Laos and Cambodia
