= List of cathedrals in Cambodia =

Today (2026) Cambodia has no cathedrals. All the cathedrals in Cambodia were destroyed by the Khmer Rouge regime in the second half of the 1970s.

== Former cathedrals ==
- Battambang Cathedral
- Cathedral of Phnom Penh
- Preah Meada
