= Olivier Schmitthaeusler =

The Most Reverend Olivier Schmitthaeusler
- Titular bishop of Catabum Castra
- Native name: Olivier Michel Marie Schmitthaeusler
- Church: Roman Catholic Church
- See: Apostolic Vicariate of Phnom Penh
- Appointed: 10 October 2010
- Predecessor: Émile Destombes

Orders
- Ordination: 28 June 1998
- Consecration: 20 March 2010 by Émile Destombes

Personal details
- Born: 26 June 1970 (age 55) Strasbourg, France
- Denomination: Roman Catholic
- Motto: ″Caritas Christi urget nos"

Olivier Schmitthaeusler (born 26 June 1970) is the current Apostolic vicar of Phnom Penh since 10 October 2010.

== Biography ==
Olivier was born in Strasbourg in 1970 as the eldest child of a big family. His father is a permanent deacon in the diocese of Strasbourg. He entered in 1989 in the major seminary of Strasbourg where he studied philosophy and theology. Between 1991 and 1994 he was cooperant in Japan for his civil service. Back to France he was ordained a priest for the Paris Foreign Missions Society on 28 June 1998 in the Strasbourg Cathedral.

He was sent as a missionary in Cambodia where he first studied Khmer language for three years between 1998 and 2001. He was finally named parish priest in the small parish of Chomkarcheang in Takéo Province.

=== Episcopal career ===
The day before Christmas 2009, he was named coadjutor vicar of Phnom Penh in order to replace bishop Émile Destombes, who was about to resign for age reasons. He succeeded him on 10 October 2010 after being ordained bishop on 20 March 2010. At that time he was the youngest French bishop and one of the youngest bishops in the world.

== Honours ==
- Cambodia:
  - Grand Order of National Merit
  - Grand Cross of the Royal Order of Sahametrei
  - Grand Cross of the Royal Order of Monisaraphon (GCM)
  - Medal of National Construction Gold
