= St. Joseph's Church, Phnom Penh =

Church building in Phnom Penh, Cambodia

Coordinates: 11°35′31″N 104°55′06″E

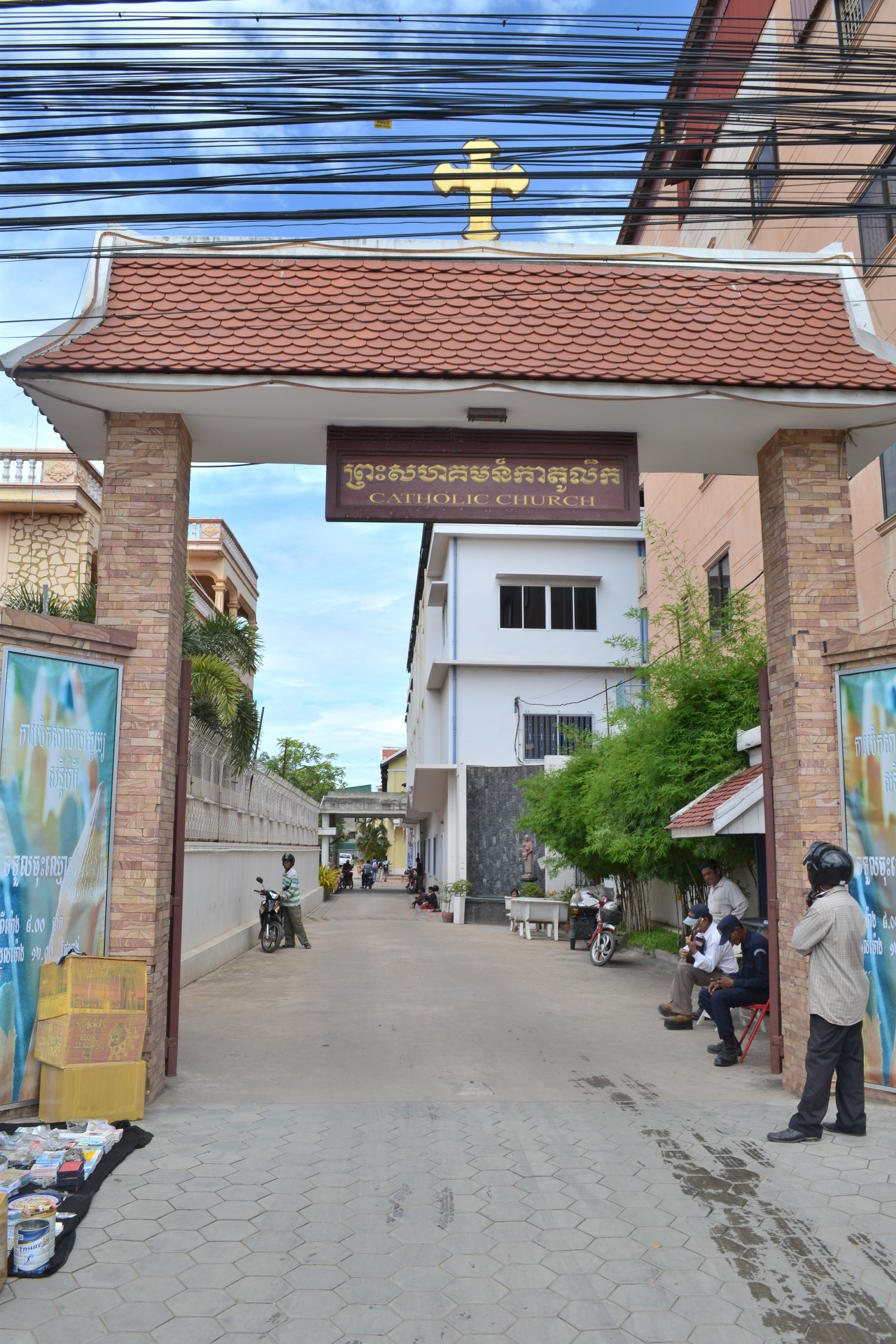
Entrance of the Church, Phnom Penh.

The St Joseph's Church (Khmer: ព្រះវិហារសន្តយ៉ូសែប) or Main Roman Catholic Church of Phnom Penh, Cambodia, is actually a school temporarily transformed into a church until the construction of an actual church. Churches of Phnom Penh were destroyed by the Khmer Rouge. This school was spared, it offers the possibility to accommodate a large number of people.

Although the majority of the faithful are of Vietnamese descent, the bishop decided that the main liturgies should be celebrated in the Khmer language. Masses are also said in other languages, in which case, the smaller chapel is used. This parish is dedicated to Saint Joseph.

The church is located about three kilometres north of the city centre, near the Tonle Sap on the N5.

In February of 2025, a new cathedral building was constructed and completed, combining both traditional Khmer and Latin architectural styles. This is the first building to sufficiently replace the original Roman Catholic Cathedral of Phnom Penh, which was demolished by the Khmer Rouge.

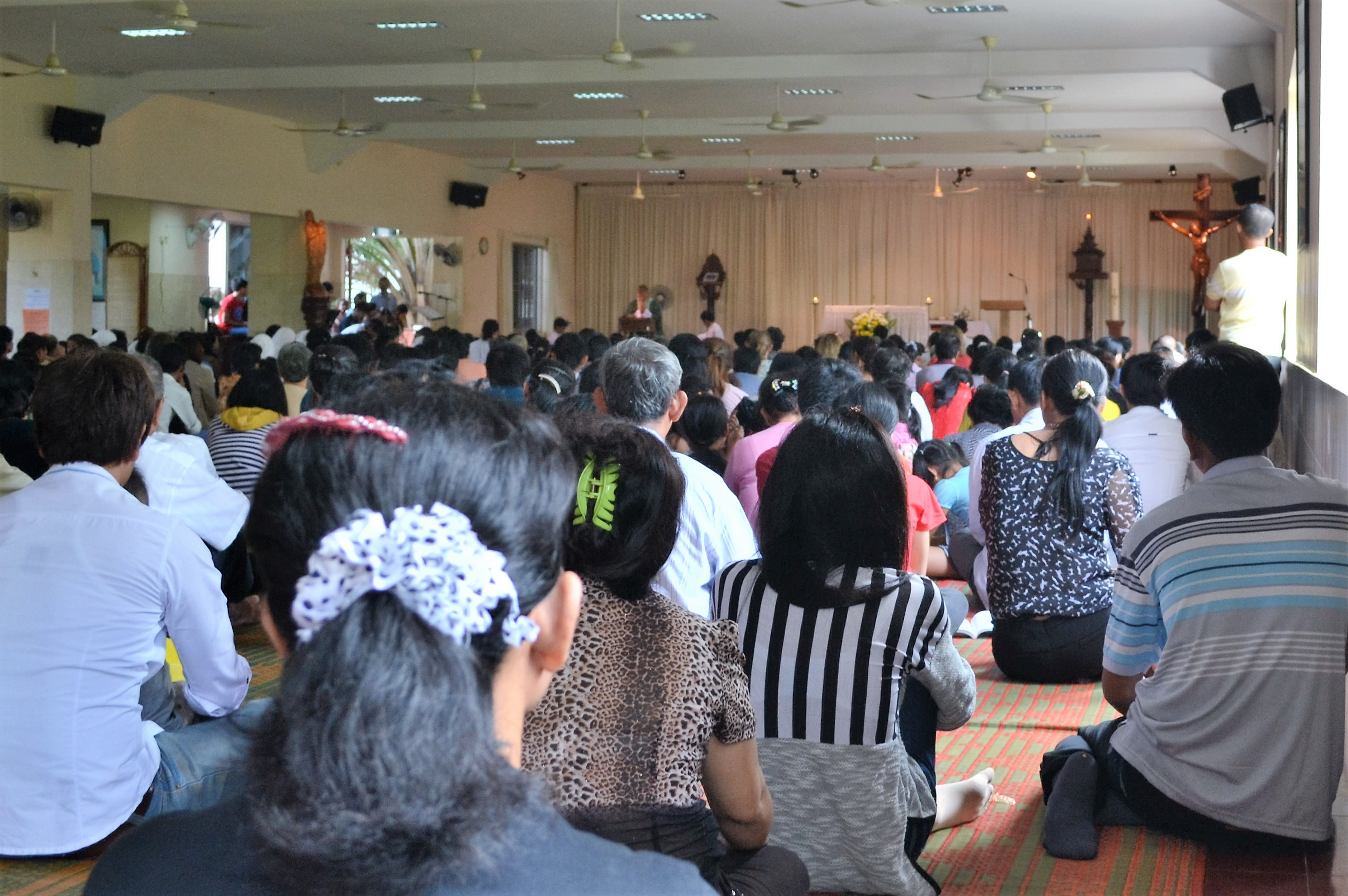
Shoes are to be removed before entering

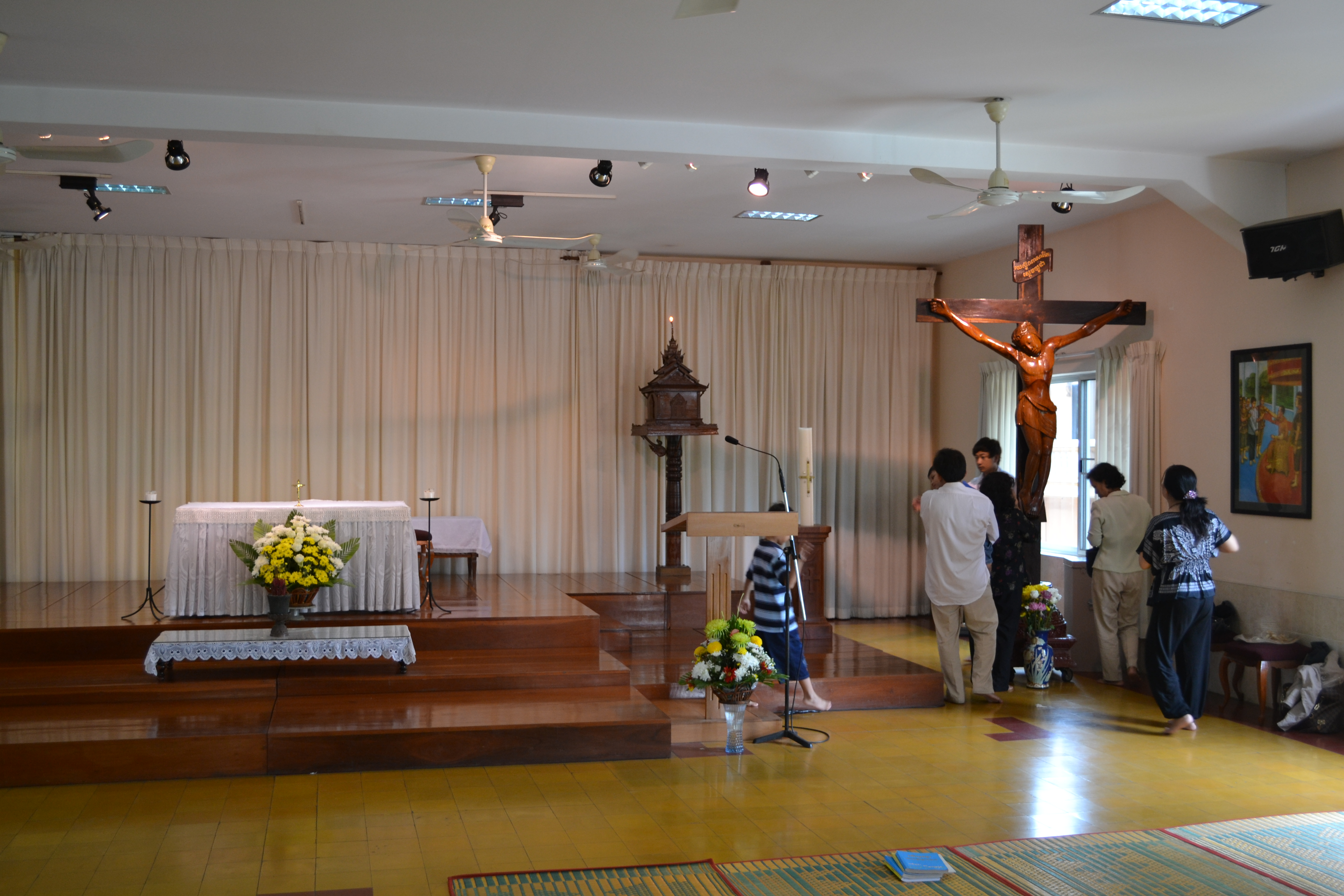
The tabernacle underwent influences of the local culture

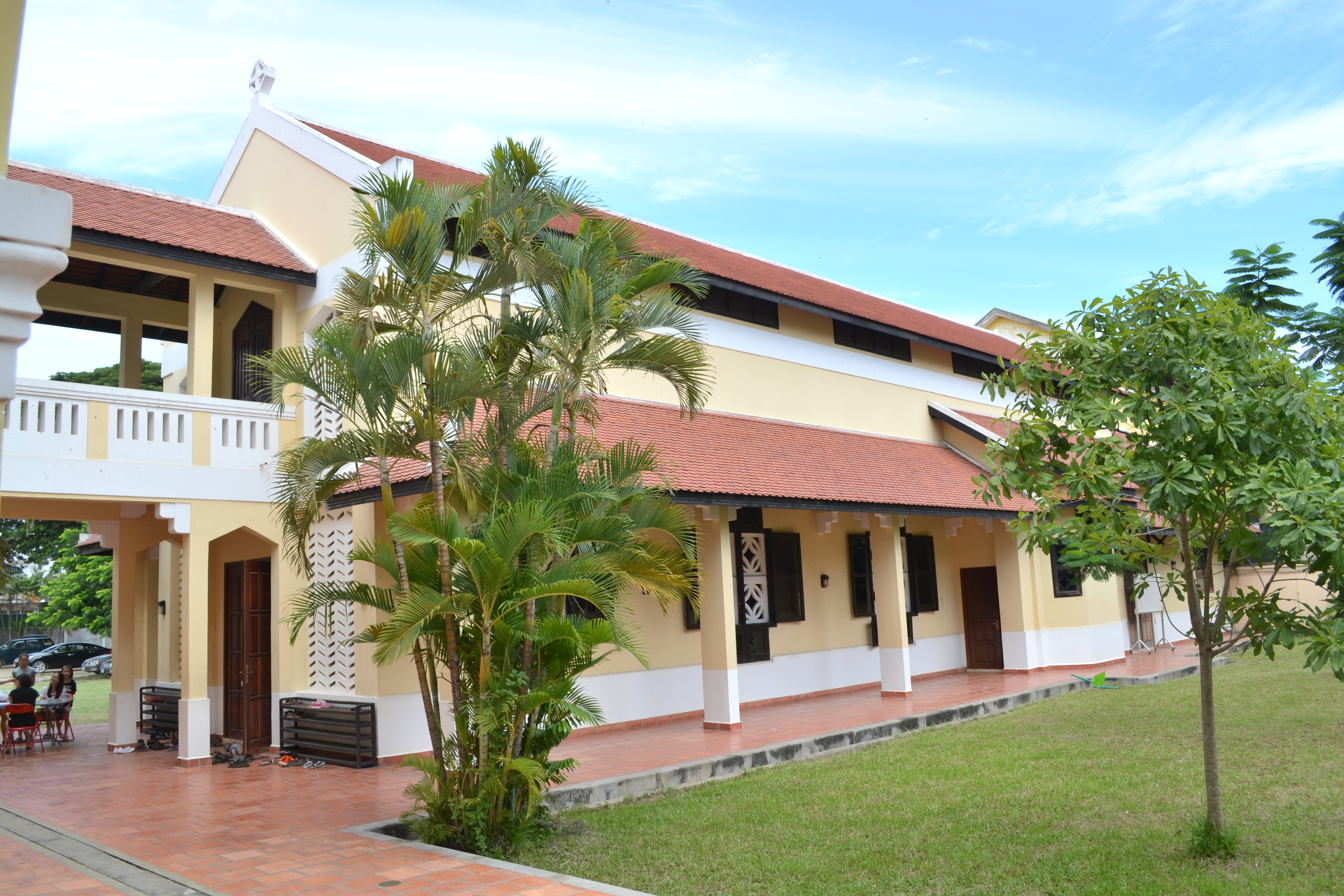
Inside Chapel

== See also ==
- Cathedral of Phnom Penh
- Chong Khneas Catholic Church
