= Freedom of religion in Cambodia =

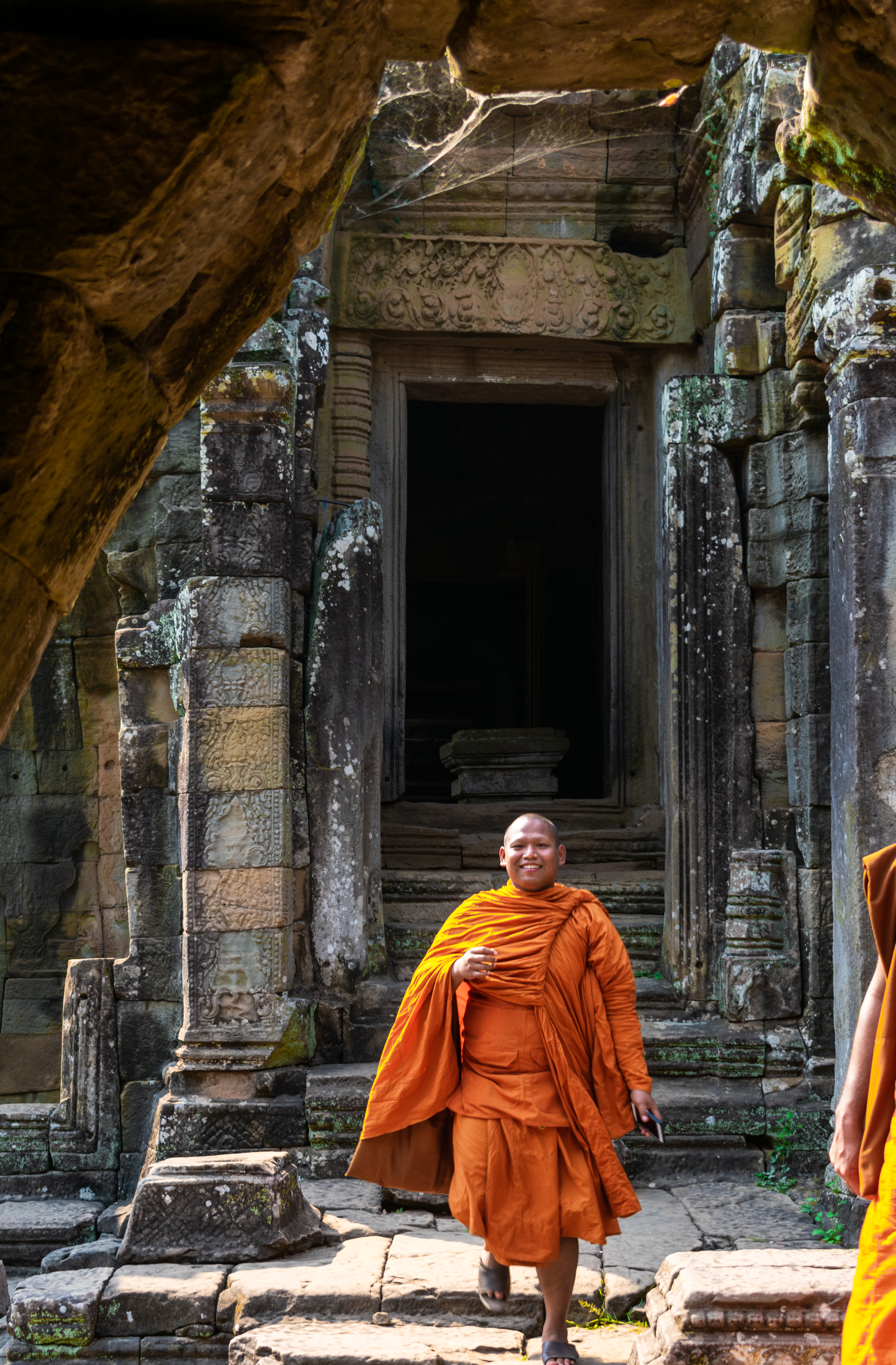

The Constitution of Cambodian provides for freedom of religion, and the government has generally respected this right in practice. Buddhism is the state religion.

The country has a population of approximately 16 million. Boston University's 2020 World Religion Database estimates that 85.4% of the population is Buddhist, 4.3% follows local traditional religions, 3% are atheist/ agnostic, 2.8% is Christian, 2.4% follow Chinese traditional religions, and 1.9% are Muslim.

In 2022, religious leaders reported improved public acceptance of persons practicing non-Buddhist religions.

In 2023, Cambodia was scored 3 out of 4 for religious freedom.

== Overview in early 2000s ==
The rest of this article is informed by the US State Dept 2007 report on Religious Freedom. A later report is available.

The Theravada Buddhist tradition is widespread and strong in all provinces, with an estimated more 4,100 pagodas throughout the country. Since the vast majority of ethnic Khmer Cambodians are Buddhist, there is a close association between Buddhism, Khmer cultural traditions, and daily life. Adherence to Buddhism generally is considered intrinsic to the country's ethnic and cultural identity. The Mahayana branch of Buddhism is practiced by approximately 150,000 followers and has 63 temples throughout the country.

There are approximately 300,000 to 400,000 Muslims (2.0 percent of the population), predominantly ethnic Cham, who generally are found in towns and rural fishing villages on the banks of the Tonle Sap and Mekong rivers and in Kampot Province. Some organizations that work with or have contacts in the Cham Muslim population cite lower estimates for the number of Cham Muslims in the country. A nationwide census scheduled for 2019 should provide a more accurate estimate. There are four branches of Islam represented: the Malay-influenced Shafi'i branch, practiced by 88 percent of Cham Muslims; the Saudi-Kuwaiti-influenced Salafi (sometimes called "Wahhabi") branch, which claims six percent of the Muslim population although this number is increasing; the indigenous Iman-San branch, practiced by three percent; and the Kadiani branch, which also contributes three percent. There are 200 to 300 mosques of the four main branches and 200 to 300 small Surav mosques, which have congregations of up to 40 persons and do not have a min-bar from which Friday sermons are given. The small, but growing, Christian community constitutes approximately two percent of the population. There are an estimated 100 Christian organizations or denominations that operate freely throughout the country and include approximately 2,400 churches; however, only 900 of these churches are officially registered. Other religious organizations with small followings include the Vietnamese Cao Dai religion and the Baha'i Faith, each with an estimated 2,000 practicing members.

Foreign missionary groups operate freely. A June 26, 2007, announcement by the Ministry of Cults and Religions restated a 2003 ban on door-to-door proselytizing and similar proselytizing activities such as using a loudspeaker or directing assistance only to denomination members. However, open-ended assistance activities by missionary groups are encouraged.

== Status of religious freedom ==
=== Legal and policy framework ===
The Constitution provides for freedom of religion, and the government generally respected this right in practice. The government does not tolerate abuse of religious freedom, either by governmental or private actors. Cambodia is a secular state. The Government promotes national Buddhist holidays, provides Buddhist training and education to monks and others in pagodas, and modestly supports an institute that performs research and publishes materials on Khmer culture and Buddhist traditions. The Constitution prohibits discrimination based on religion.

The law requires all religious groups, including Buddhist groups, to submit applications to the Ministry of Cults and Religious Affairs if they wish to construct places of worship and conduct religious activities. In their applications, groups must state clearly their religious purposes and activities, which must comply with provisions forbidding religious groups from insulting other religious groups, creating disputes, or undermining national security. However, there is no penalty for failing to register, and in practice some groups do not.

During the period covered by this report, there were no reports that any religious groups encountered significant difficulties in obtaining approval for construction of places of worship. The Directive on Controlling External Religions requires registration of places of worship and religious schools, in addition to government approval prior to constructing new places of worship. Places of worship must be located at least 2 kilometers from each other and may not be used for political purposes or to house criminals or fugitives from the law. The distance limitation has begun to be enforced but applies only to new construction of places of worship and not to offices of religious organizations. The order requires that religious teachings respect other religious groups.

Government officials continued to organize annual meetings for representatives of all religious groups to discuss religious developments and to address problems of concern.

The Constitution designates Buddhism as the state religion. The government permits Buddhist religious instruction in public schools as an extension of this constitutional designation.

=== Restrictions on religious freedom ===
Government policy and practice contributed to the generally free practice of religion. Despite re-issuance in June 2007 of a ban on door-to-door proselytizing, foreign missionary groups generally operated freely throughout the country and did not encounter significant difficulties in performing their work. Government officials expressed appreciation for the work of many foreign religious groups in providing much needed assistance in education, rural development, and training; however, officials also expressed some concern that foreign groups used the guise of religion to become involved in illegal or political affairs. During the reporting period, the Government did not close any Islamic schools (madrassahs) as it had in the past.

There were no reports of religious prisoners or detainees in the country.

=== Forced religious conversion ===
There were no reports of forced religious conversion, including of minor U.S. citizens who had been abducted or illegally removed from the United States, or of the refusal to allow such citizens to be returned to the United States.

== Societal abuses and discrimination ==
There were limited reports of societal abuses or discrimination based on religious belief or practice.

On the morning of April 26, 2006, a Buddhist mob knocked down and burned an unfinished Christian church in Kandal Province. Reportedly, provincial authorities had denied the Wesleyan Church permission to build a church, so the group built a house for religious teachers to be converted to a church at a later date. The district governor of the area reportedly negotiated a reconciliation agreement between the Buddhists and Christians in the area, whereby the house could be rebuilt and no charges pressed against those who participated in the riot. The local church leader confirmed that the house had not been rebuilt but he planned to turn the property into a school.

Minority religious groups experienced little or no societal discrimination during the period covered by this report; however, Muslims and Christians reported minor conflicts.

Occasional tensions were reported among the branches of Islam that receive monetary support from groups in Saudi Arabia, Kuwait, Malaysia, or Indonesia, depending on the tenets of the branch. Some Buddhists also expressed concern about the Cham Muslim community receiving financial assistance from foreign countries. However, in general, Cham Muslims were well integrated into society, enjoyed positions of prominence in business and the government, and faced no reported acts of discrimination or abuse during the period covered by this report.

There are ecumenical and interfaith organizations, which are often supported by funding from foreign public or private groups.

== See also ==
- Human rights in Cambodia
- Religion in Cambodia
- Religious abuse
