= Apostolic Prefecture of Battambang =

Catholic missionary jurisdiction in Cambodia

Apostolic Prefecture of Battambang Praefectura Apostolica Battambangensis ភូមិភាគបាត់ដំបង

Location
- Country: Cambodia

Statistics
- Area: 81,456 km^{2} (31,450 sq mi)
- Population: Total; Catholics: (as of 2010); 4,335,000; 4,125 (0.1%)

Information
- Denomination: Roman Catholic
- Sui iuris church: Latin Church
- Rite: Latin Rite
- Established: 26 September 1968

Current leadership
- Apostolic Prefect: Enrique Figaredo Alvargonzalez, S.J.

Map
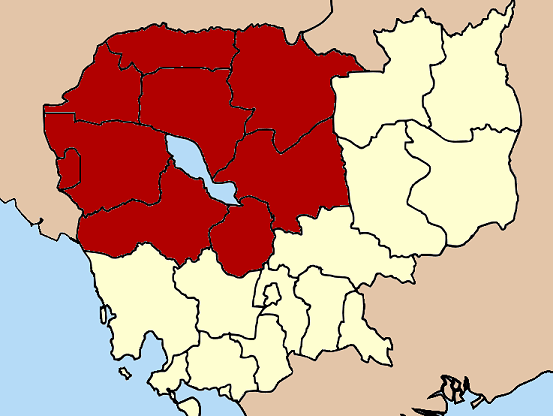
- The Apostolic Prefecture of Battambang

The Apostolic Prefecture of Battambang (or Bătdâmbâng) is a territorial subdivision of the Roman Catholic Church in Cambodia, subject directly to the Holy See through the Dicastery for Evangelization.

The prefecture covers an area of 80,430 km^{2} of north-western Cambodia, covering the provinces of Banteay Meanchey, Battambang, Kampong Chhnang, Kampong Thom, Oddar Meanchey, Pailin, Preah Vihear, Pursat and Siem Reap. As of 2006, the estimated total population in the prefecture is 4,639,184 and 7,000 are members of the Catholic Church. The prefecture is subdivided into 27 parishes or pastoral areas, and has 10 priests altogether.

== History ==
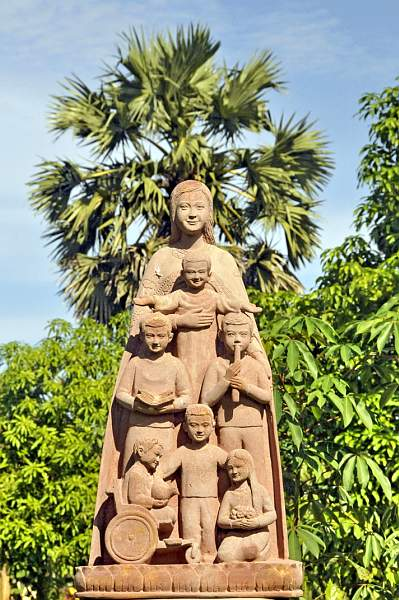
Mary, Our Mother of Inclusive Love.

The Apostolic Prefecture of Battambang traces its roots in the history of the Catholic Community in Battambang City. On January 5, 1790, about 300 Cambodian Catholics left Pursat and Kompong Svay and settled in the outskirts of Battambang town, in the area that has been the cradle of Catholic presence and is now called Pet Yiet Chee. Some settled in the provinces of Siem Reap and Kompong Thom.

In the middle of the 19th century, when the Kingdom of Cambodia was all but destroyed by war with the Thai, the Catholic communities almost disappeared. In 1850 the Holy See established the Apostolic Vicariate of Phnom Penh, covering all the Kingdom of Cambodia, entrusting it to the care of the priests of the Paris Foreign Missions Society.

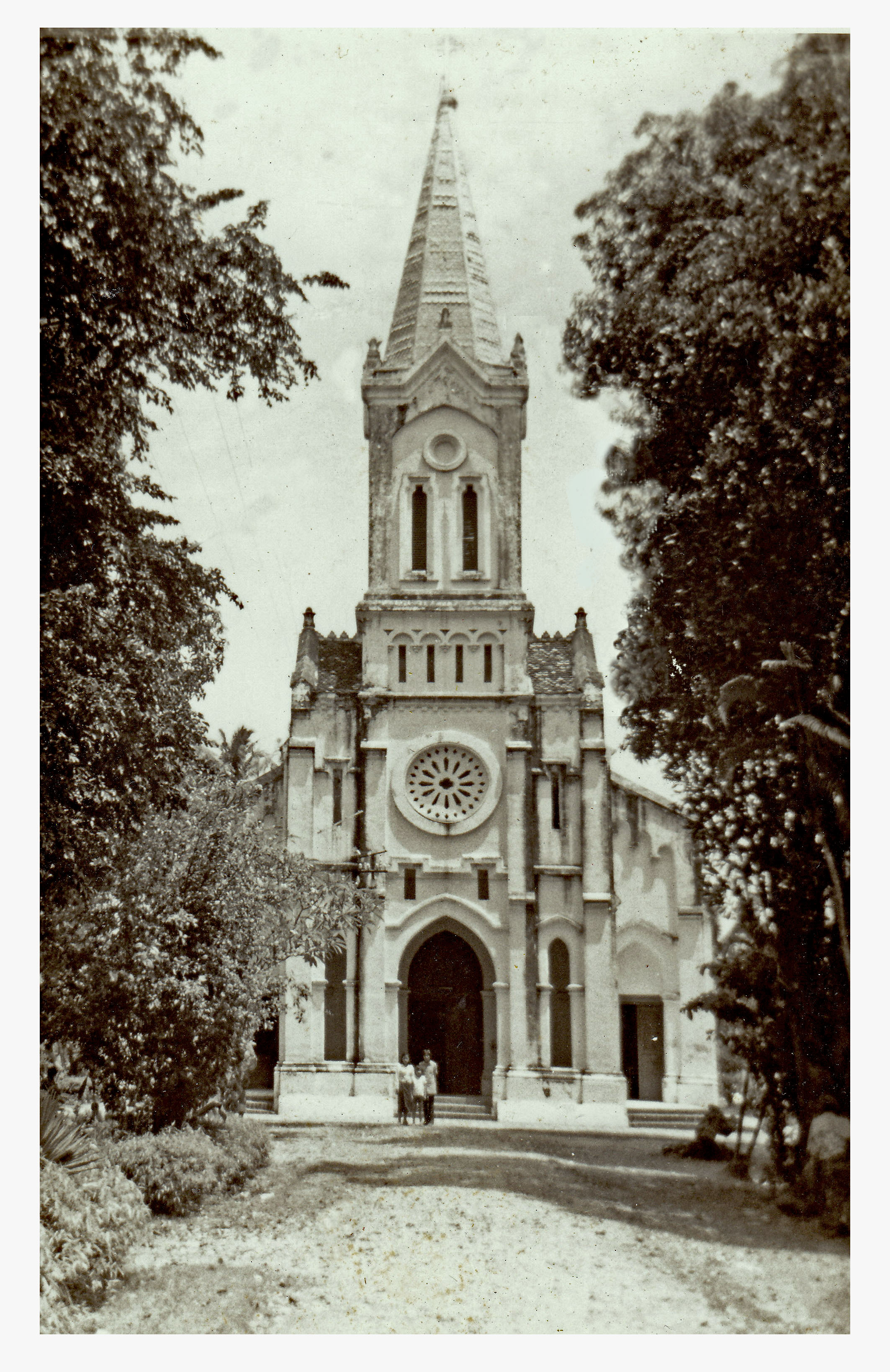
Old Battambang Catholic Church in Pet Yiey Chee compound destroyed by the Khmer Rouge in 1975

During the French Protectorate, many Catholics came from Vietnam and settled in Cambodia. In 1905, two Sisters of Providence of Portieux went to Battambang and opened an orphanage and a hospital. A church built at around that time on the same piece of land was totally leveled later in the Khmer Rouge regime.

On September 26, 1968, the Apostolic Vicariate of Phnom Penh was divided into three: Phnom Penh, Kompong Cham and Battambang.

During the genocidal years of 1975 to 1979, all the Cambodian priests and religious, except for a handful of Religious Sisters who happened to be outside the country, and a great number of lay Catholics, lost their lives. Paul Tep Im Sotha, who had been named the first Apostolic Prefect of Battambang in 1968, was killed together with Dom Jean Badre, a French Benedictine monk, in May 1975 in Bat Trang in the Mongolborei district of Banteay Meanchey Province.

At the end of the Khmer Rouge period, in 1979 and in the early eighties, only some Catholics were among the several hundred thousand who lived in the refugee settlements along the Thai border. The tiny communities grew, and during this time of exile, intense effort was made by the Paris Foreign Mission priests to translate the bible and liturgy into the Khmer language.

After the liberation of 1979, the Catholics slowly re-gathered, prayed together, and organized their lives around their faith. With the return of the refugees in the early 1990s, Catholic communities in the northwest of the Prefecture gathered momentum. The refugees who came back from the camps and the new Catholics from the camps gave new life to the Church, since they had received intense formation during their exile in Thailand. In Battambang, although property rights were lost during the years of turbulence and exile, the Catholic Church was able to buy back the same property and building which was formerly the hospital of the Sisters of Providence. Quickly this became an important pastoral centre for nurturing the small communities back to full life. In Chomnaom, the Church compound was given back to the community without any remunerations made.

In 1990, the Catholic communities were given the permission to worship freely in Cambodia, and Caritas Cambodia was re-established after an absence of 15 years. Bishop Yves Ramousse, who since 1983 had been responsible for the pastoral care of Cambodian communities dispersed around the world, officially returned in late 1992. On July 25, 1992, the Holy See re-appointed him as Vicar Apostolic of Phnom Penh. On December 21 of the same year, he was also appointed Apostolic Administrator of Battambang until the year 2000.

=== Enrique Figaredo, SJ ===
On July 2, 2000, Enrique Figaredo (commonly known as Mgr. Kike), a Jesuit priest from Asturias in Spain, who has been deeply involved in the life of the Cambodians beginning with his work in the Thai-Cambodia refugee camps, was installed as Prefect Apostolic.

With the appointment of Figaredo, a new era for the Apostolic Prefecture of Battambang began. Since 1985, Figaredo has worked with the Cambodian people, first through the Jesuit Refugee Service (JRS) in the camps on the Thai-Cambodia border and, later, in Banteay Prieb Technical School for the Handicapped and landmine victims in Ang Snuol, 22 kilometers from Phnom Penh. The school aims to help in the reintegration of war victims into the society again. Figaredo is an apostle on the bumpy roads of Cambodia, extending outreach services especially to people in the northwest of the country. Because of his presence to people and the active commitment of the Society of Jesus to the Cambodians, the Holy See put the leadership of the Catholic Church to the Jesuits through Figaredo. On July 2, 2010, the Catholic communities celebrated his 10 years of presence and leadership in the country.

== Ordinaries ==
- Paul Tep Im Sotha: September 26, 1968 – May 1975 (was killed)
- Between 1992 and 2000, Bishop Yves-Georges-René Ramousse, Apostolic Vicar of Phnom Penh, served as administrator.
- Enrique Figaredo Alvargonzalez, S.J.: appointed April 1, 2000.
