= Zhe Jiang Fortune Financial Center =

Skyscraper in Hangzhou, China

- 浙江财富金融中心
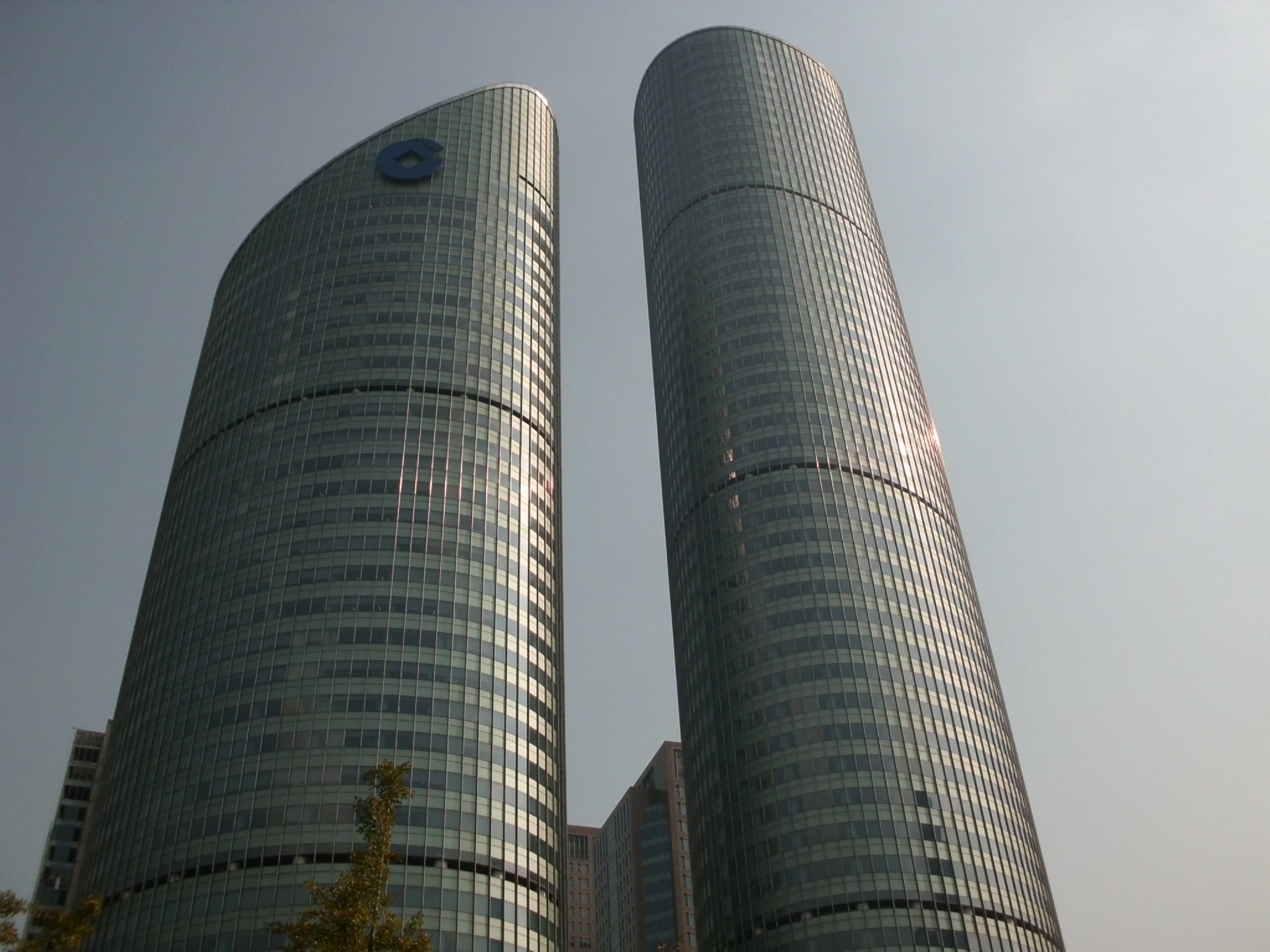

General information
- Status: Completed
- Type: Office
- Location: Hangzhou, China, Hangzhou Qianjian Lot 7, Qianjiang New City, Hangzhou
- Coordinates: 30.24225°N 120.21039°E
- Construction started: 2007
- Completed: 2011

Height
- Roof: 258 m (846 ft) (Tower 1); 188 m (617 ft) (Tower 2)

Technical details
- Structural system: Reinforced concrete
- Floor count: 52 (Tower 1); 36 (Tower 2)
- Floor area: 210,000 m^{2} (2,260,000 sq ft)

Design and construction
- Architects: John Portman & Associates
- Developer: Zhejiang Tefulong Real Estate Development Co.
- Structural engineer: Shanghai Institute of Architectural Design & Research

The Zhe Jiang Fortune Financial Center (Chinese: 浙江财富金融中心) is an office skyscraper complex in the Qianjiang New City district of Hangzhou, China. Built between 2007 and 2011, the complex consists of two towers, with the tallest (Tower 1) standing at 258 m (846 ft) tall with 52 floors, which is the current 9th tallest building in Hangzhou.

== History ==
=== Architecture ===
It is adjacent to the Hangzhou International Conference Center and Hangzhou Grand Theater to the east, the Civic Center to the north, and faces Hangzhou GT Land Plaza across Fuchun Road. The developer is Zhejiang Tefulong Real Estate Development Co., Ltd. and the architect in chief is John C. Portman Jr..

John Portman's design was completed in June 2005 and won the bid. It is adjacent to Fuchun Road, Jiefang East Road, Xiangzhang Street and Wuxing Road.

Construction began on July 17, 2007 and was completed on November 15, 2011. The project has a designed service life of 50 years and cost RMB 2 billion. The total construction area is 210,000 square meters (170,000 square meters above ground and 40,000 square meters underground). It also features a large underground parking garage.

The West Building and the East Building are 212 meters and 148 meters high respectively, and both have sloping roofs, giving each other a dynamic sculptural feel. Both buildings have helicopter landing pads on top for business activities or emergencies. The West Building was once the tallest completed building and skyscraper in Hangzhou until it was surpassed in 2017 by the 279.7-meter-high Bodi Center Building C located in Qianjiang Century City.

The East Building of Zhejiang Fortune Financial Center is the Zhejiang Branch of China Construction Bank. Accor Group opened the Hangzhou Qianjiang New Town Mercure Hotel on the 52nd to 57th floors of the West Building of Zhejiang Fortune Financial Center.

== See also ==
- List of tallest buildings in China
- List of tallest buildings in Hangzhou
