= Greenland Hangzhou Center =

Supertall skyscraper in Hangzhou, Zhejiang, China

Greenland Hangzhou Century Center
- 杭州世纪中心
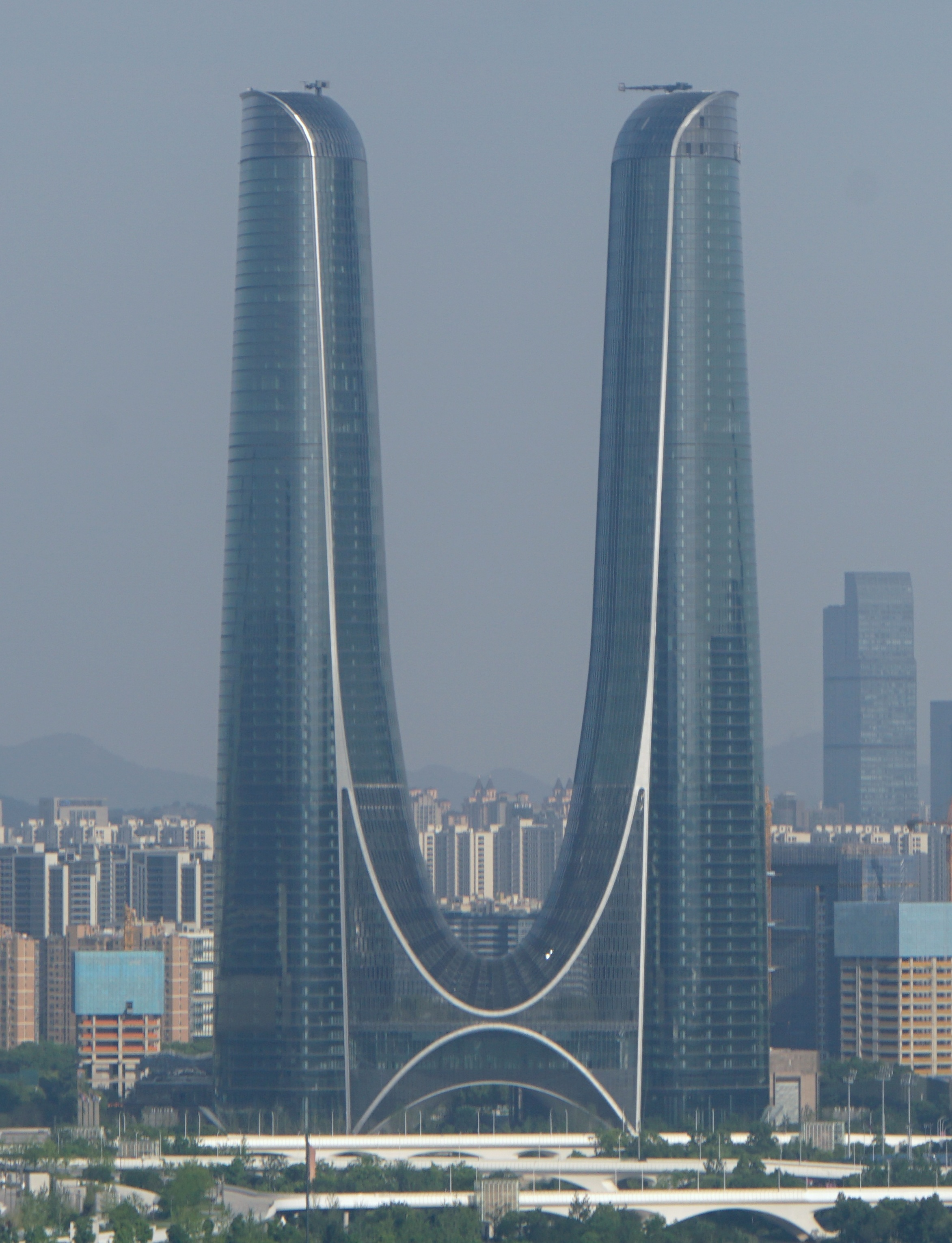
- Interactive map of the Greenland Hangzhou Century Center area

General information
- Status: Completed
- Type: Mixed-use: Office / Hotel
- Location: Hangzhou, China, No. 301 Benjing Avenue, Qianjiang Century City, Xiaoshan District, Hangzhou
- Coordinates: 30.22730°N 120.23689°E
- Construction started: 2017
- Completed: 2023

Height
- Roof: 304 m (997 ft); 303 m (994 ft)

Technical details
- Structural system: Reinforced concrete
- Floor count: 64
- Floor area: 530,892 m^{2} (5,710,000 sq ft) (entire complex)

Design and construction
- Architects: Skidmore, Owings & Merrill LLP; East China Architectural Design & Research Institute (Record); Arup Group (Interiors)
- Developer: Greenland Holdings
- Structural engineer: Skidmore, Owings & Merrill LLP (Structure & MEP)
- Main contractor: Shanghai Construction Group

The Greenland Hangzhou Century Center (also known as the Hangzhou Arch) is a mixed-use skyscraper complex in the Xiaoshan District of Hangzhou, China. Built between 2017 and 2023, the complex consists of two cojoined twin towers standing at 304 m (997 ft) (South Tower) and 303 m (994 ft) tall (North Tower), with 64 floors each. They are the current tallest buildings in Hangzhou.

== History ==
The project is located in the proximity of the Hangzhou Olympic Sports Expo Center. It is bounded by Hangzhou International Expo Center to the east, Benjing Avenue to the south, Comprehensive Training Hall to the west, and Qijia River to the north. The project started pile foundation construction on October 13, 2017, and was originally planned to be completed and delivered before the 2022 Asian Games. It was finally completed in 2023.

=== Architecture ===
Standing 310 meters high, it is the tallest twin-tower building in the Yangtze River Delta and the tallest building in Hangzhou. Together with the five high-rise buildings on the two subway-covered properties in the area, it forms a "Big Dipper" posture, and echoes the "Sun and Moon Shining Together" building complex in Qianjiang New City on the opposite bank of the Yangtze River, together forming a new landmark of Hangzhou in the Qiantang River era.

The iconic wing-shaped shape of the twin towers is derived from the first letter H of the pinyin of Hangzhou, which symbolizes the city's soaring, harmony and beauty. The land area is 77,572 m^{2} (835,000 sq ft), and the total construction area is 530,892 m^{2} (5,710,000 sq ft). The roof of the twin towers is 282 meters high and the crown is 310 meters high. It integrates corporate headquarters, comprehensive business, super five-star hotel, boutique shopping mall and other functions.

The center, featuring offices, a hotel, and residences, is a key component of Qianjing Century City, a recently developed nine-square-mile mixed-use area that includes sports facilities. Dressed in a transparent glass veil, the supertall tower seamlessly transitions from a unitized glass curtain wall at the base to a fully enclosed facade as it rises, symbolizing a curtain opening to the urban landscape. The public skybridge and over 6,000 color-changing LEDs in the tower's glazing system enhance its outward-facing role.

== Gallery ==
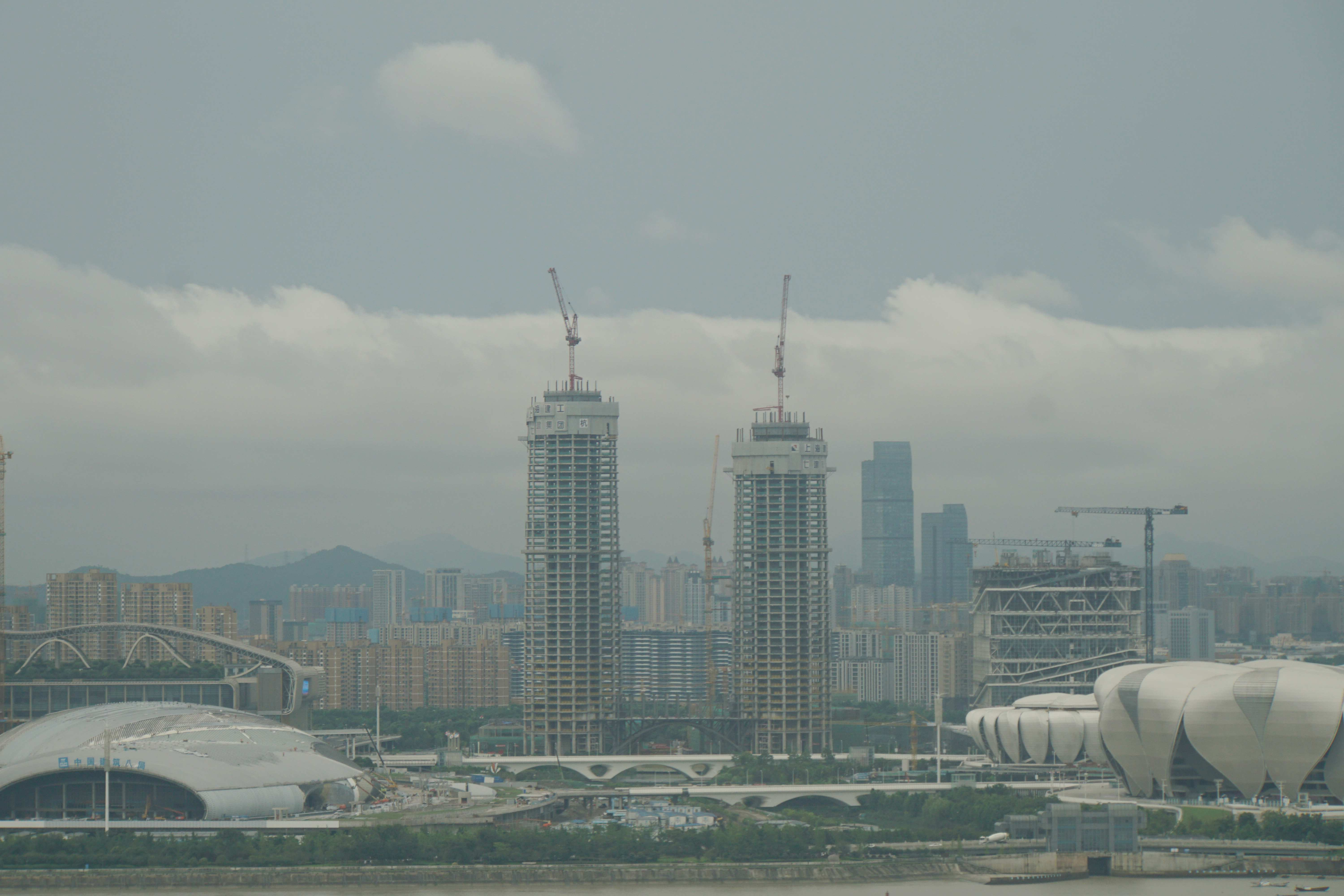
The construction site in July 2020,

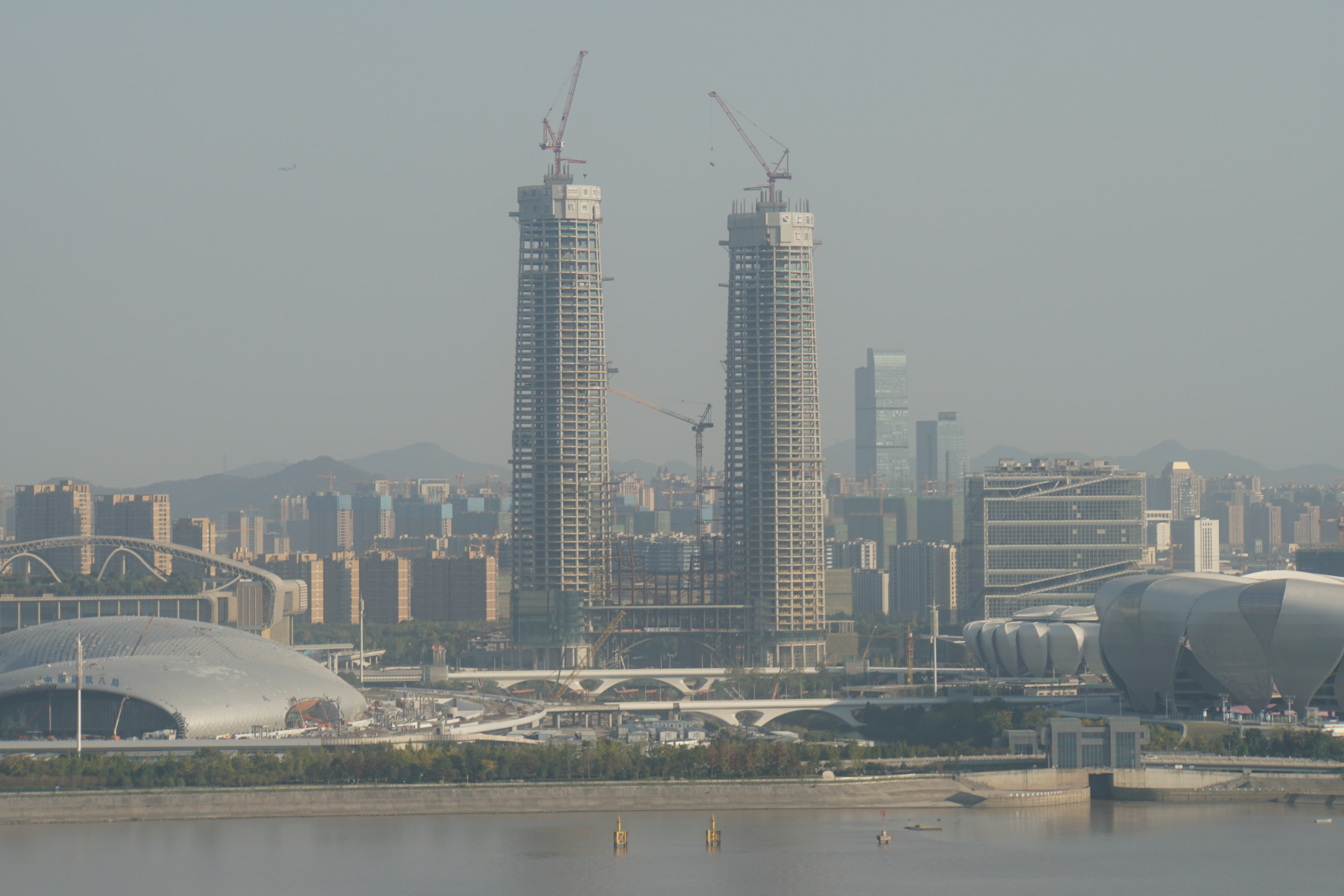
...in November 2020,

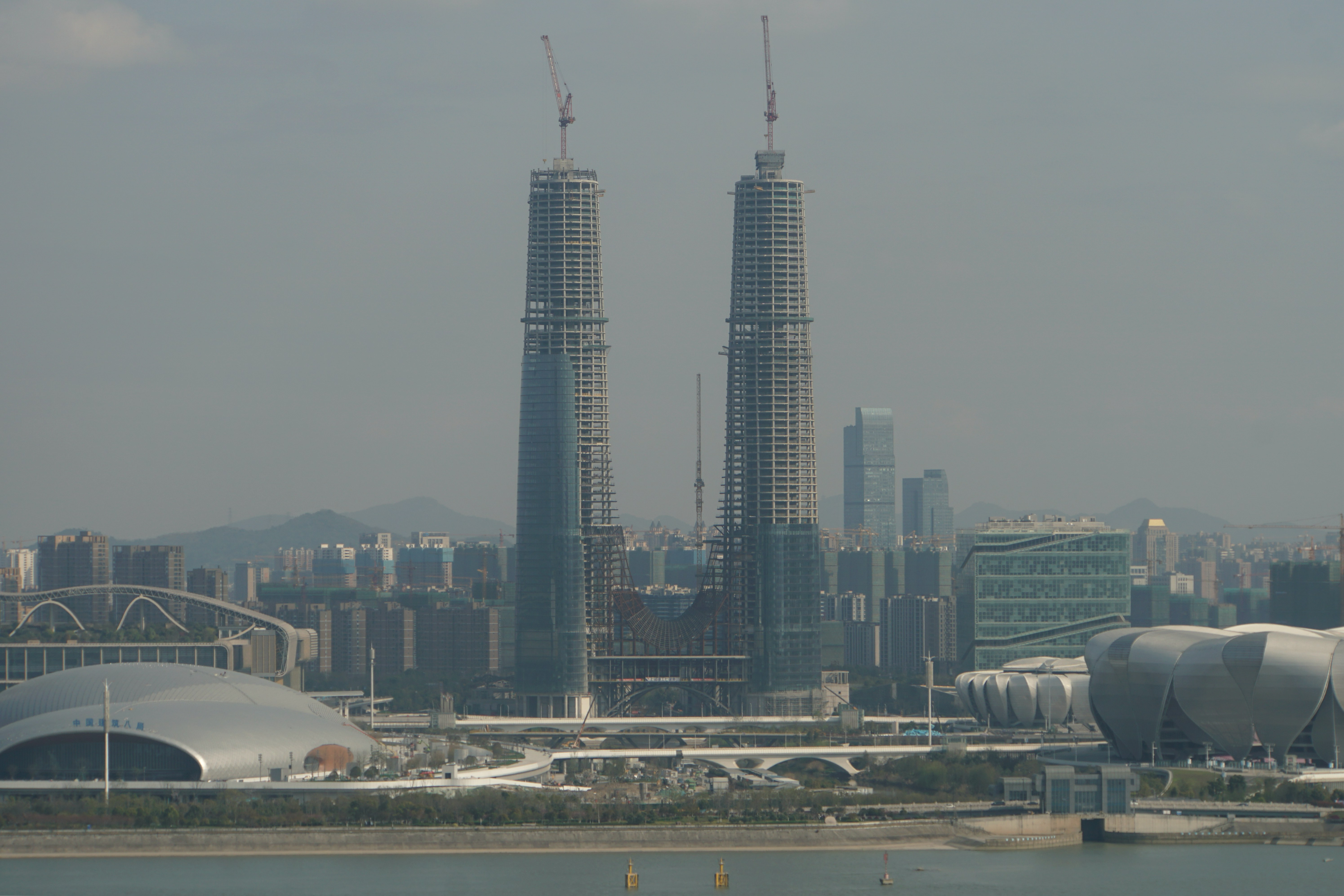
...in March 2021,

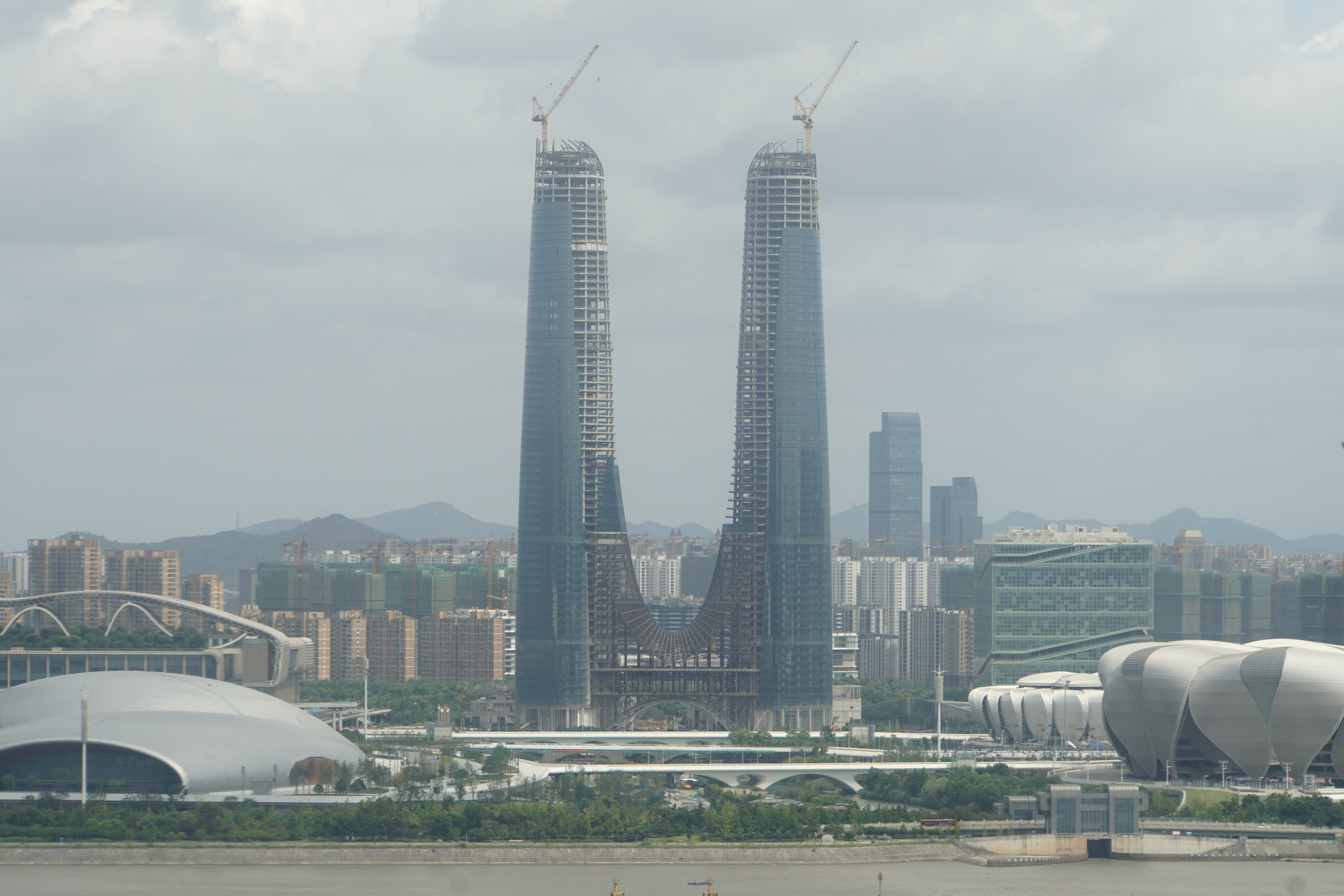
...in November 2021,

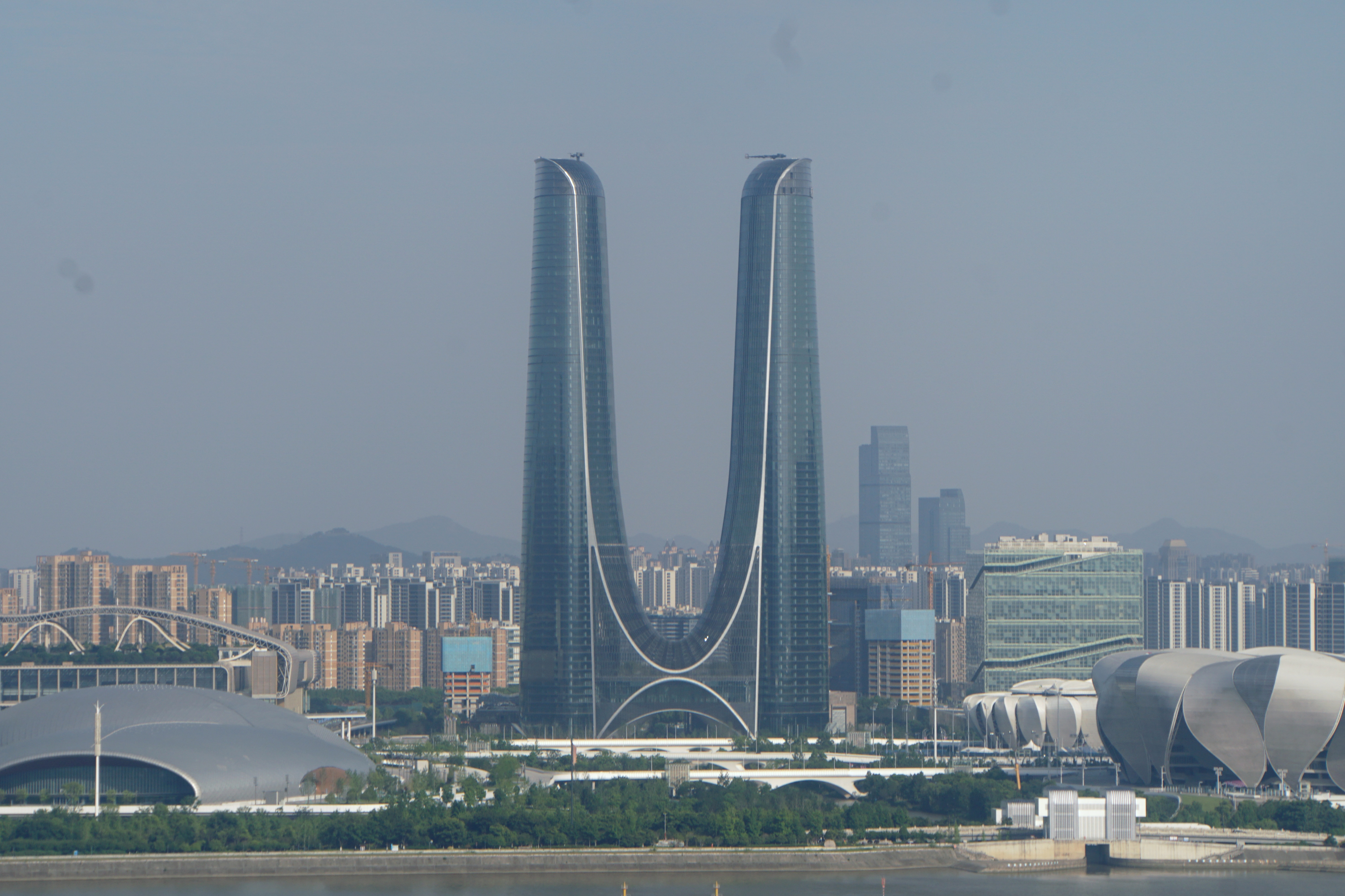
...and after completion in May 2023

== See also ==
- List of tallest buildings in China
- List of tallest buildings in Hangzhou
