= Hangzhou Wangchao Center =

Supertall skyscraper in Hangzhou, Zhejiang, China

- 望朝中心
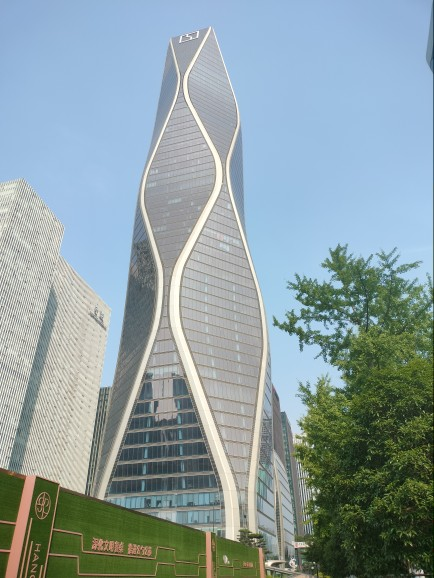
- Interactive map of the Hangzhou Wangchao Center area

General information
- Status: Completed
- Type: Mixed-use: Office / Hotel
- Location: Hangzhou, China, 67P3+W98, Qianjiang Century City, Xiaoshan District, Hangzhou
- Coordinates: 30°14′23″N 120°14′56″E
- Construction started: 2018
- Completed: 2023

Height
- Roof: 280 m (920 ft)

Technical details
- Structural system: Reinforced concrete
- Floor count: 54 (+4 underground)
- Floor area: 170,000 m^{2} (1,830,000 sq ft) (entire complex)
- Lifts/elevators: 22 (Mitsubishi Group)

Design and construction
- Architect: Skidmore, Owings & Merrill LLP
- Developer: Dadao Qiyun
- Structural engineer: Skidmore, Owings & Merrill LLP (Structure & MEP)

The Hangzhou Wangchao Center (Chinese: 望朝中心) also known as the One Century Tower is a mixed-use skyscraper in the Xiaoshan District of Hangzhou, China. Built between 2018 and 2023, the tower stands at 280 m (920 ft) with 54 floors and is the current 4th tallest building in Hangzhou.

== History ==
The building is located at the intersection of Qianjiang Century City's Xinbei Road and Yingfeng Road in Xiaoshan District. The main developer of the project is the Dadao Qiyun Group (also known as the Zhejiang Chengdao Real Estate Co., Ltd.), the architectural concept and design was created by the American studio SOM New York Design Office, and the construction was overseen by Zhongnan Construction. Construction started on November 25, 2018, and is expected to be completed in September 2023. The main building is 280 meters high (54 floors), the podium is about 50 meters high with 10 floors, and there are 4 underground floors. The total building area is 170,000 square meters. Located near the south entrance of Qingchun Tunnel and next to Exit D of the Yingfeng Road Station with the Hangzhou Metro Line.

=== Architecture ===
In order to safeguard the tower from earthquakes, the building utilizes a central concrete core along with angled outer columns and a set of curved mega-columns along the building's perimeter. The central and boundary columns assist in supporting hybrid steel floor framing and truss deck slabs, coordinated with the mega-columns. Secondary perimeter columns branch out to ensure consistent column bay spacing as the mega-columns incline away from each other. The inclined columns mimic the shape of the tower and serve as mega-braces, ensuring the building's earthquake resistance by avoiding convergence at one point.

The tower and an additional 10-story building only take up a small part of the site. The plaza's design promotes movement, with pathways encircled by ponds and plantings amidst the buildings. The design of the tower lobby enables ease of movement for pedestrians around the travertine-covered core of the building. The levels above, which include two sky lobbies, adhere to this same layout. At the top, a spacious amenity level offers room for gatherings and events with panoramic city views.

The SOM scheme's shape is influenced by a mix of architectural vision and structural clarity. The glazed façade features eight mega-columns that slope outwards, giving a sense of fluidity and allowing for spacious, adaptable floorplates. Secondary perimeter columns extend outward to ensure consistent column spacing as the main columns move apart. A Vierendeel transfer truss connects the primary and secondary columns above the lobby, forming an open lobby area.

== See also ==
- List of tallest buildings in China
- List of tallest buildings in Hangzhou
