= List of tallest buildings in Hangzhou =

Tall buildings in Hangzhou
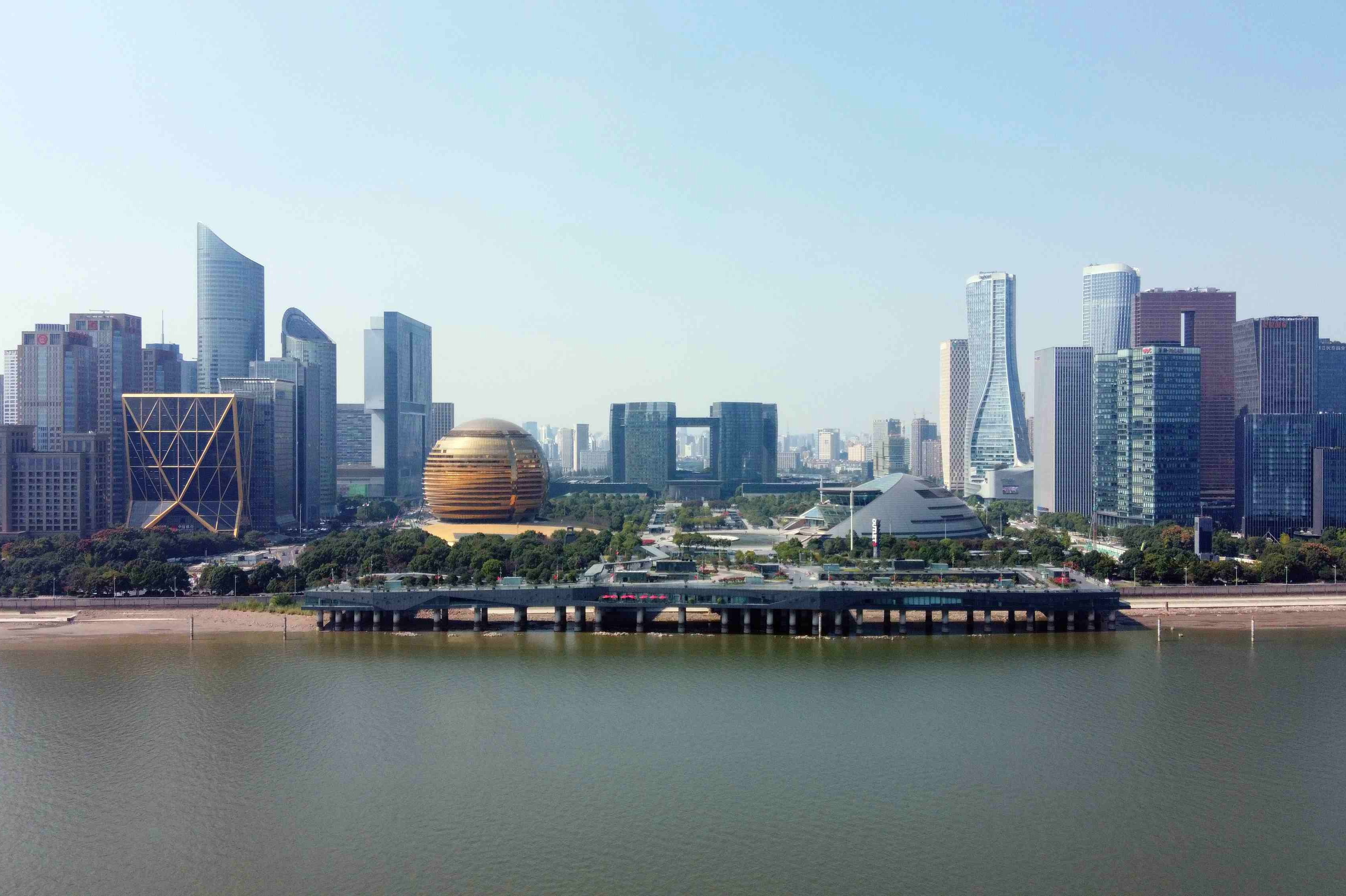
- The skyline of Qianjiang New City in Hangzhou
- Tallest building: Greenland Hangzhou Center 1 (2023)
- Tallest building height: 303.7 m (996 ft)
- First 150 m+ building: Hangzhou Telecom Mansion (2003)

Number of tall buildings
- Taller than 150 m (492 ft): 99 (2026)
- Taller than 200 m (656 ft): 33 (2026)
- Taller than 300 m (984 ft): 2

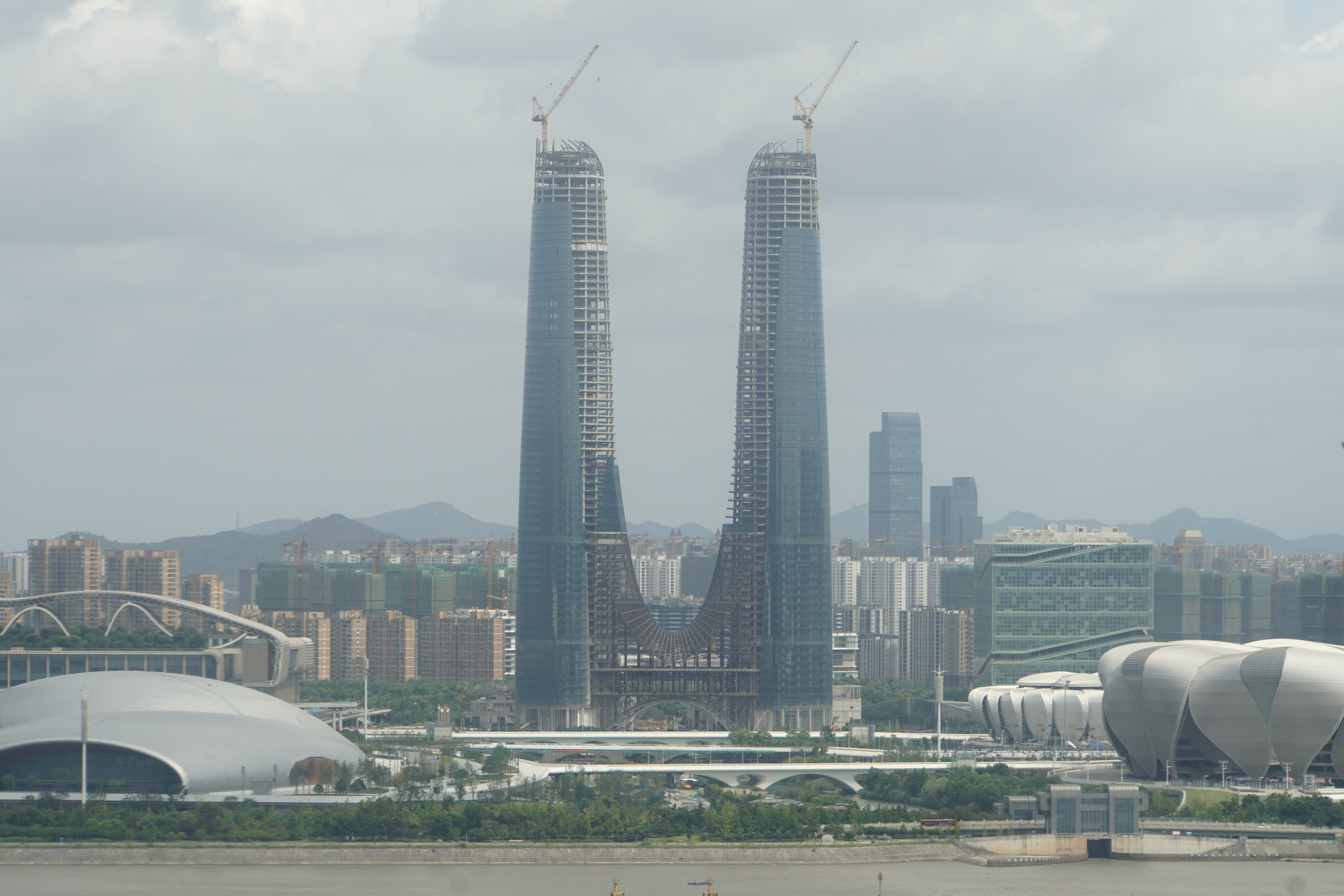
Greenland Center under construction in Qianjiang Century City in 2021

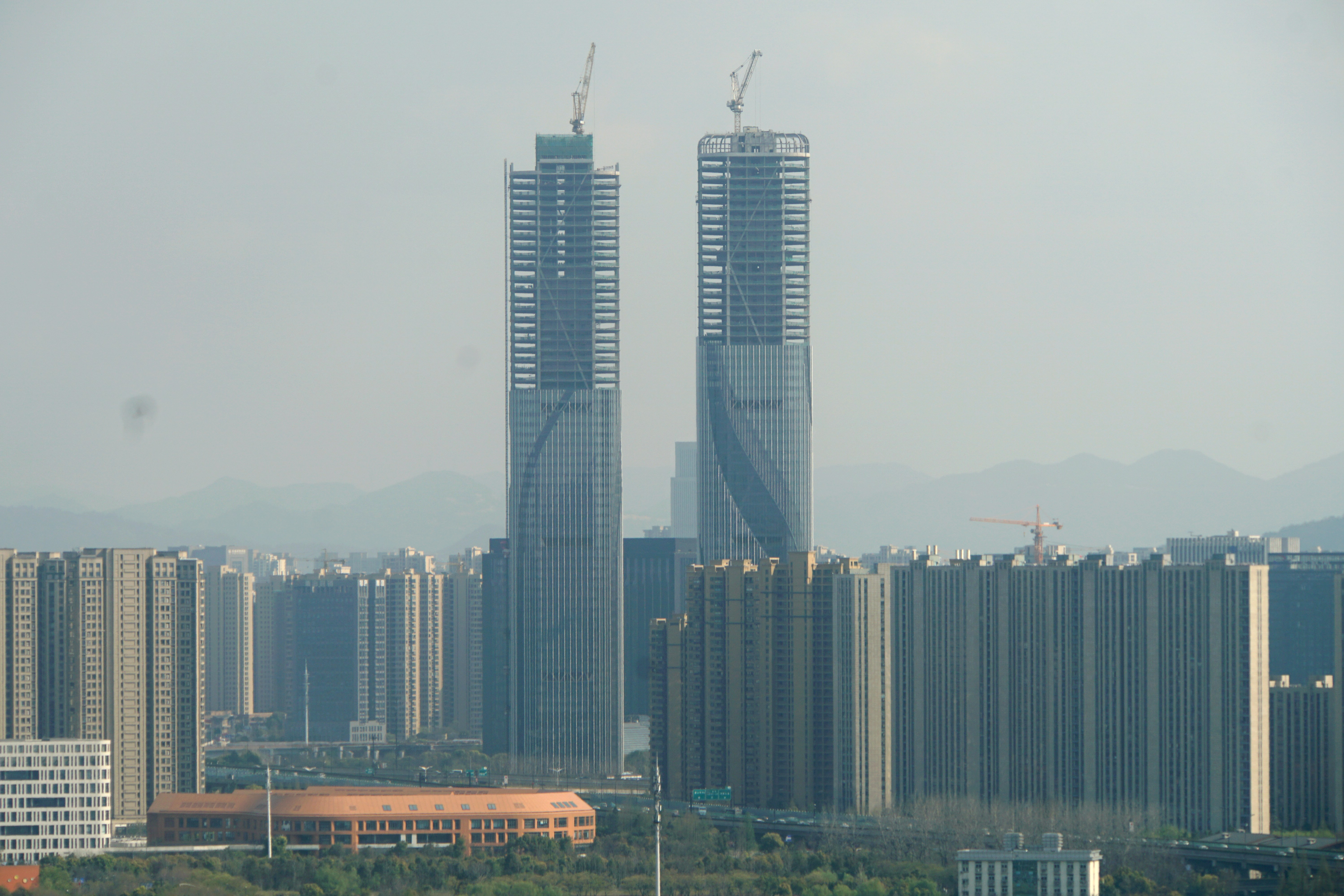
Shimao Twin Towers under construction in Binjiang in 2021

The following list of tallest buildings in Hangzhou ranks skyscrapers in the Chinese city of Hangzhou, Zhejiang by height. Hangzhou is the capital and largest city of Zhejiang, with a population of 13 million and an urban population of over 10.7 million.

Most skyscrapers in Hangzhou are clustered around the Qianjiang New City and Qianjiang Century City. The tallest building in the city is the south tower of Greenland Hangzhou Center, which is 303.7 m (996 ft) tall. It is only half a meter taller than its twin tower to the north. Completed in 2023, the two towers are interconnected at the base and form the tallest landmark in Qianjiang Century City. They are the first supertall buildings to be completed in Hangzhou; unlike many other Chinese cities of a similar size, Hangzhou did not construct any supertall skyscrapers in the 2010s.

Starting in the early 2020s, Hangzhou underwent an unprecedented boom in skyscraper construction. Hangzhou West Railway Station Hub, a development at Hangzhou West railway station, is under construction and will consist of two supertall buildings, one of which will become the new tallest building in the city at 320 meters.

== Tallest buildings ==
This list ranks Hangzhou skyscrapers that stand at least 200 m (656 ft) tall, based on standard height measurement. This includes spires and architectural details but does not include antenna masts. Buildings that have already topped out are also included.

Was the tallest building in Hangzhou upon completion

Rank	Name	Image	Height	Floors	Usage	Year	Notes
1	Greenland Hangzhou Century Center South Tower		303.7 m (996 ft)	64	Office	2023	
2	Greenland Hangzhou Century Center North Tower		303.3 m (995 ft)	64	Mixed-use	2023	
3	Hangzhou Chengbei MixC		285 m (935 ft)	58	Office	2023	
4	Aux Center		280 m (920 ft)	59	Office	2021	
4	Hangzhou Wangchao Center		280 m (920 ft)	54	Mixed-use	2023	
6	Bodi Center Tower C		279.7 m (918 ft)	57	Office	2017	
7	Shimao Riverfront Wisdom Tower A		272.3 m (893 ft)	60	Office	2022	
8	Shimao Riverfront Wisdom Tower B		272.3 m (893 ft)	60	Office	2022	
9	Longda Tower 1		268 m (879 ft)	61	Office	2021	
10	Zhe Jiang Fortune Financial Center Tower 1		258 m (846 ft)	52	Office	2011	
11	Grand Parkray Hangzhou Hotel Tower 1		258 m (846 ft)	50	Hotel	2013	
12	Raffles City Hangzhou Tower 2		256.5 m (842 ft)	59	Mixed-use	2017	
13	Raffles City Hangzhou Tower 1		256.3 m (841 ft)	61	Mixed-use	2017	
14	Hangzhou Telecom Mansion		248 m (814 ft)	41	Office	2003	
15	Greentown Excellence Aoxuan City Tower A		240.1 m (788 ft)	70	Mixed-use	2023	
16	Hangzhou International Office Center A2.1		240 m (790 ft)	51	Mixed-use	2023	
17	Hangzhou International Office Center A2.2		240 m (790 ft)	51	Office	2023	
18	Greentown Excellence Aoxuan City Tower B		239.5 m (786 ft)	66	Mixed-use	2023	
19	Wanxiang City Tower 1		229.9 m (754 ft)	50	Mixed-use	2015	
20	Boya Times Center		223 m (732 ft)	50	Office	2023	
21	Euro America Financial City Tower 1		220 m (720 ft)	43	Mixed-use	2021	
22	Euro America Financial City Tower 2		220 m (720 ft)	43	Mixed-use	2021	
23	New Century Grand Hotel		218 m (715 ft)	45	Hotel	2005	
24	Zhejiang Television Center		218 m (715 ft)	42	Office	2016	
25	TCC Hangzhou		210 m (690 ft)	47	Mixed-use	2024	
26	Huaye Tower		207 m (679 ft)	43	Office	2022	
27	Wanyin International 2		205 m (673 ft)	43	Office	2014	
28	Vientiane World Center Tower 2		201.9 m (662 ft)	43	Office	2021	
29	Mega International Commercial Bank		200 m (660 ft)	40	Office	2024	
30	Wanyin International 3		200 m (660 ft)	41	Office	2014	
31	Dicara Gold Tower - Hilton Hotel		200 m (660 ft)	55	Hotel	2014	
32	Jumeirah Hangzhou Hotel		200 m (660 ft)	43	Hotel	2018	
33	Wanxiang City Tower 2		200 m (660 ft)	47	Office	2015	

== Tallest under construction or proposed ==
=== Under construction ===
The following table lists buildings that are under construction in Hangzhou that are expected to reach at least 200m (656 feet) in height.

Name	Height	Floors	Use	Year
Hangzhou West Railway Station Hub Tower A	320 m	61	Mixed-use	-
Hangzhou West Railway Station Hub Tower B	300 m	68	Mixed-use	-
Hangzhou R&F Center Tower 1	280.1 m	59	Office	2027
Zheshang Commercial Bank Headquarters Building	249.8 m	54	Office	2025
New World Global Center Tower 1	249.7 m	57	Mixed-use	2025
Hangzhou Tonino Lamborghini Executive Apartments	249.7 m	57	Mixed-use	2025
Hangzhou SKP Tower B	230 m	-	Mixed-use	2026
Hangzhou SKP Tower E	230 m	-	Mixed-use	2026
Hangzhou Longfor Center	221 m	48	Mixed-use	2026
Hangzhou SKP Tower C	215 m	-	Office	2026
Hangzhou EIC Tower 3	213.1 m	40	Office	2025
Hangzhou EIC Tower 4	213.1 m	40	Office	2025
Hangzhou West Railway Station Hub Tower C	213 m	49	Mixed-use	2025
Hangzhou West Railway Station Hub Tower D	213 m	49	Mixed-use	2025
Hangzhou SKP Tower D	210 m	-	Office	2026
