= Raffles City Hangzhou =

Skyscraper complex in Hangzhou, China

- 杭州来福士广场
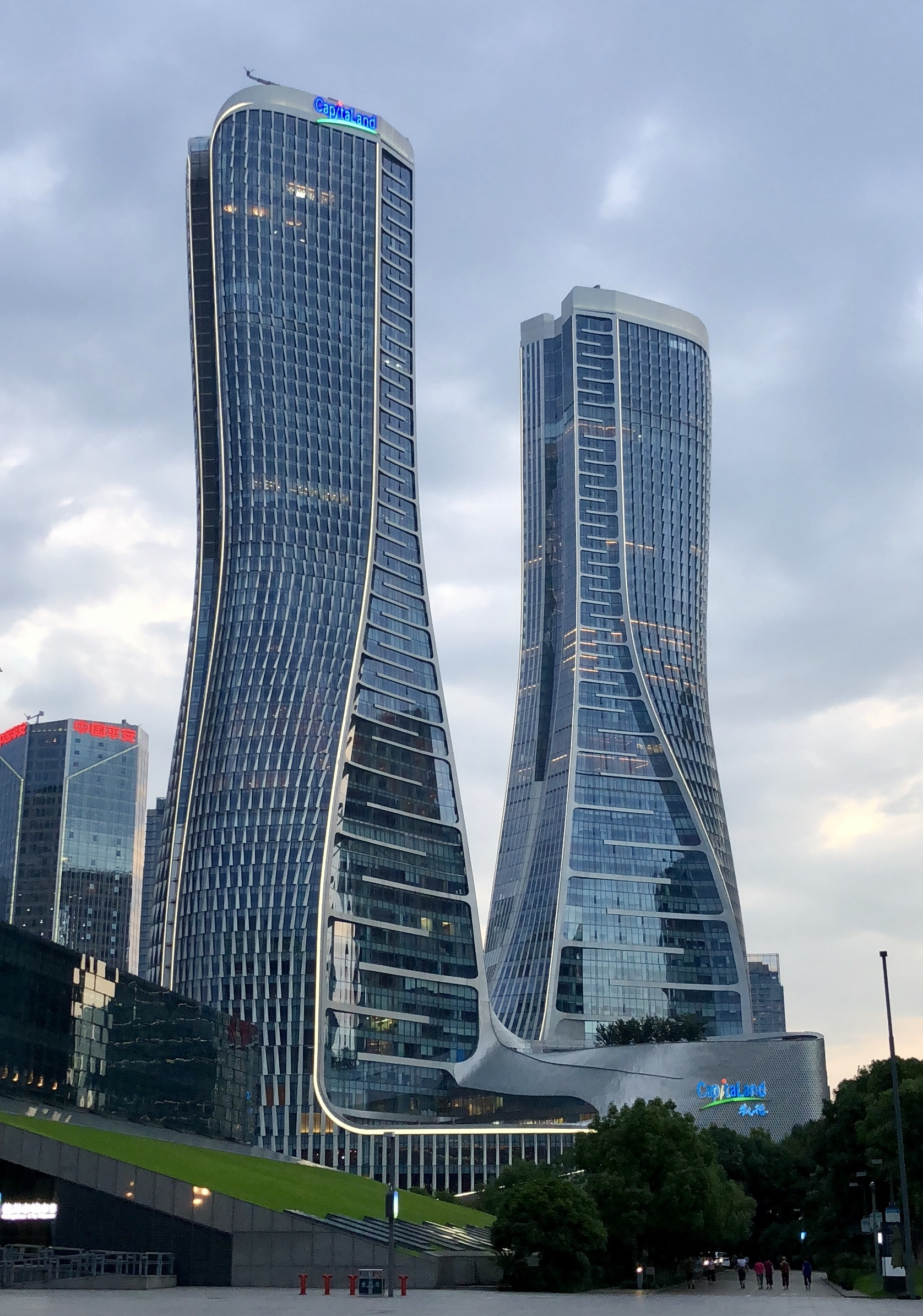
- Raffles City Hangzhou in July 2018
- Interactive map of the Raffles City Hangzhou area

General information
- Status: Completed
- Type: Hotel / Office / Residential / Retail
- Location: Qianjiang New City, Hangzhou, Zhejiang, China
- Coordinates: 30°15′03″N 120°12′31″E
- Construction started: 2010
- Completed: 2017

Height
- Architectural: 1. 256.3 m (841 ft); 2. 256.5 m (842 ft)
- Tip: 1. 256.3 m (841 ft); 2. 256.5 m (842 ft)

Technical details
- Material: Reinforced concrete and steel
- Floor count: 1. 61; 2. 59
- Floor area: 396,200 square feet (36,810 m^{2})

Design and construction
- Architects: Ben van Berkel, UNStudio
- Developer: CapitaLand
- Structural engineer: Arup

Website
- www.unstudio.com

Raffles City Hangzhou
- Simplified Chinese: 杭州来福士广场
- Traditional Chinese: 杭州來福士廣場
Transcriptions
Standard Mandarin
- Hanyu Pinyin: Hángzhōu Láifúshì Guǎngchǎng

Raffles City Hangzhou (Chinese: 杭州来福士广场, 杭州来福士中心) is a large-scale commercial center including office buildings, star-rated hotels, serviced apartments and shopping centers located in the core area of Qianjiang New City in Hangzhou, Zhejiang, China. It is CapitaLand's sixth Raffles City after Singapore, Shanghai, Beijing, Chengdu and Bahrain. In 2019, Raffles City Hangzhou won the 2019 FIABCI World Prix d'Excellence Awards Retail World Gold Award.

== See also ==
- Raffles City
- List of tallest buildings in Hangzhou
