= Hangzhou No.2 Telecom Hub =

Skyscraper in Hangzhou, China

Hangzhou Telecom Mansion
- 杭州电信大厦
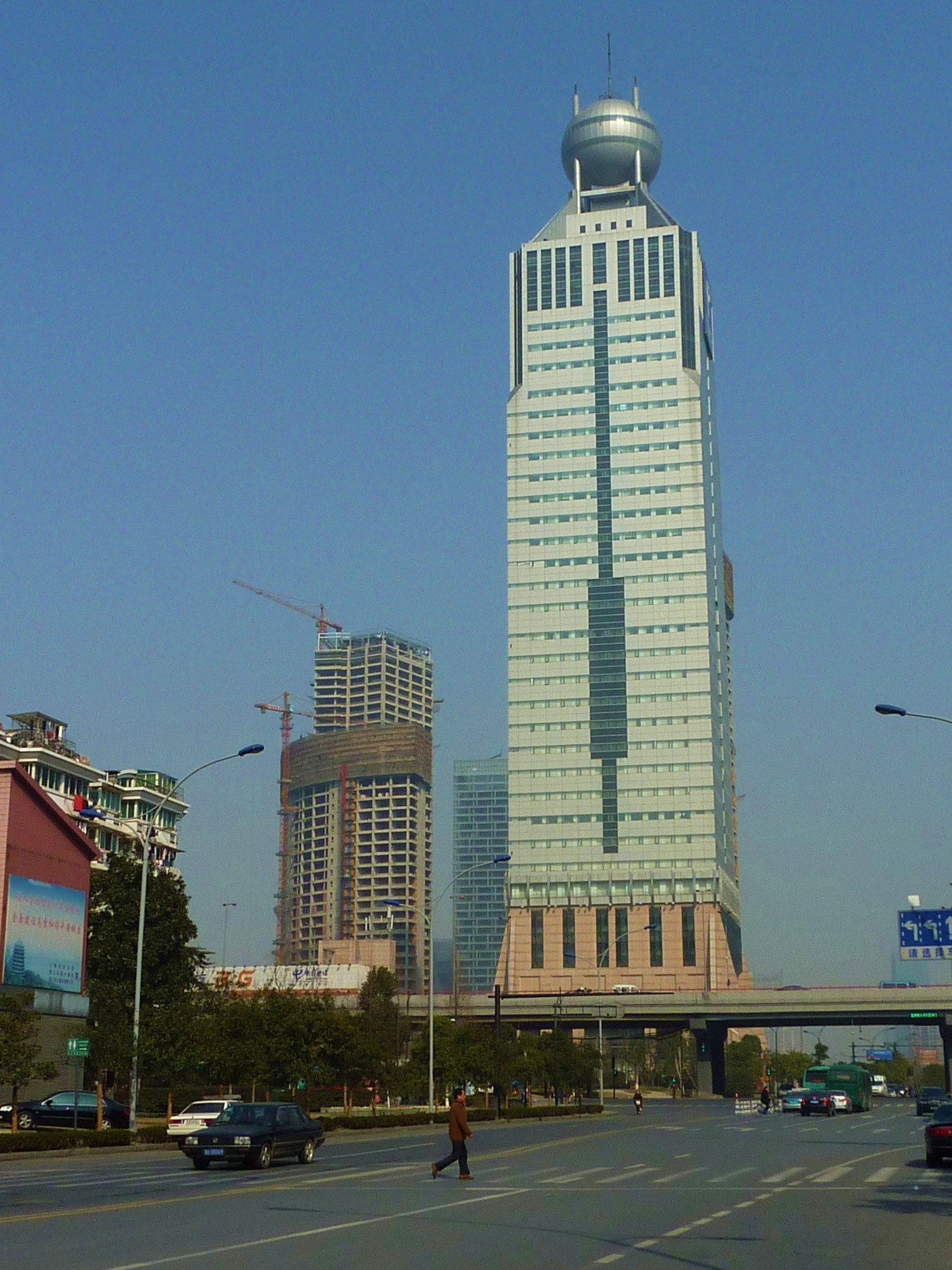
- Interactive map of the Hangzhou Telecom Mansion area

General information
- Status: Completed
- Type: Office
- Location: Hangzhou, China, 288 Fuchun Road, Qianjiang New City, Hangzhou
- Coordinates: 30.23827°N 120.20488°E
- Construction started: 1999
- Completed: 2003
- Owner: China Telecommunications Corporation

Height
- Antenna spire: 248 m (814 ft)

Technical details
- Structural system: Concrete
- Floor count: 41 (+2 underground)

The Hangzhou Telecom Mansion (Chinese: 杭州电信大厦) is an office skyscraper in the Qianjiang New City district of Hangzhou, China. Built between 1999 and 2003, the tower stands at 248 m (814 ft) tall by antenna spire and is the current 13th tallest building in Hangzhou.

== History ==
=== Architecture ===
The tower is located on the Fuchun Road in Qianjiang New City, one of the largest districts of Hangzhou. It is the main office building owned by the Hangzhou Branch of the China Telecommunications Corporation. The first telecommunication building in Hangzhou is located at Wulin Gate and was built in the 1970s.

The building is located at the east end of the Qianjiang Third Bridge. The construction began in October 1998 and was finished in early 2003. The building was officially put into use on December 28, 2006, taking a total of nine years between the groundbreaking and the official opening. At that time, the Qianjiang New City was in its early stages of construction, and the time of its opening was repeatedly postponed due to the slow progress of supporting facilities.

The roof height of the building measures 232 meters high (248 meters by antenna spire), making it the tallest building in Hangzhou at the time of its completion. It was surpassed by the 258-meter-high Zhejiang Fortune Financial Center West Tower which was completed in 2010. It has a total of 43 floors, including two underground floors and 41 above ground levels.

== See also ==
- List of tallest buildings in China
- List of tallest buildings in Hangzhou
