= Murray Terrace =

Row of fourteen shophouses in Singapore

Coordinates: 1°16′45″N 103°50′40″E

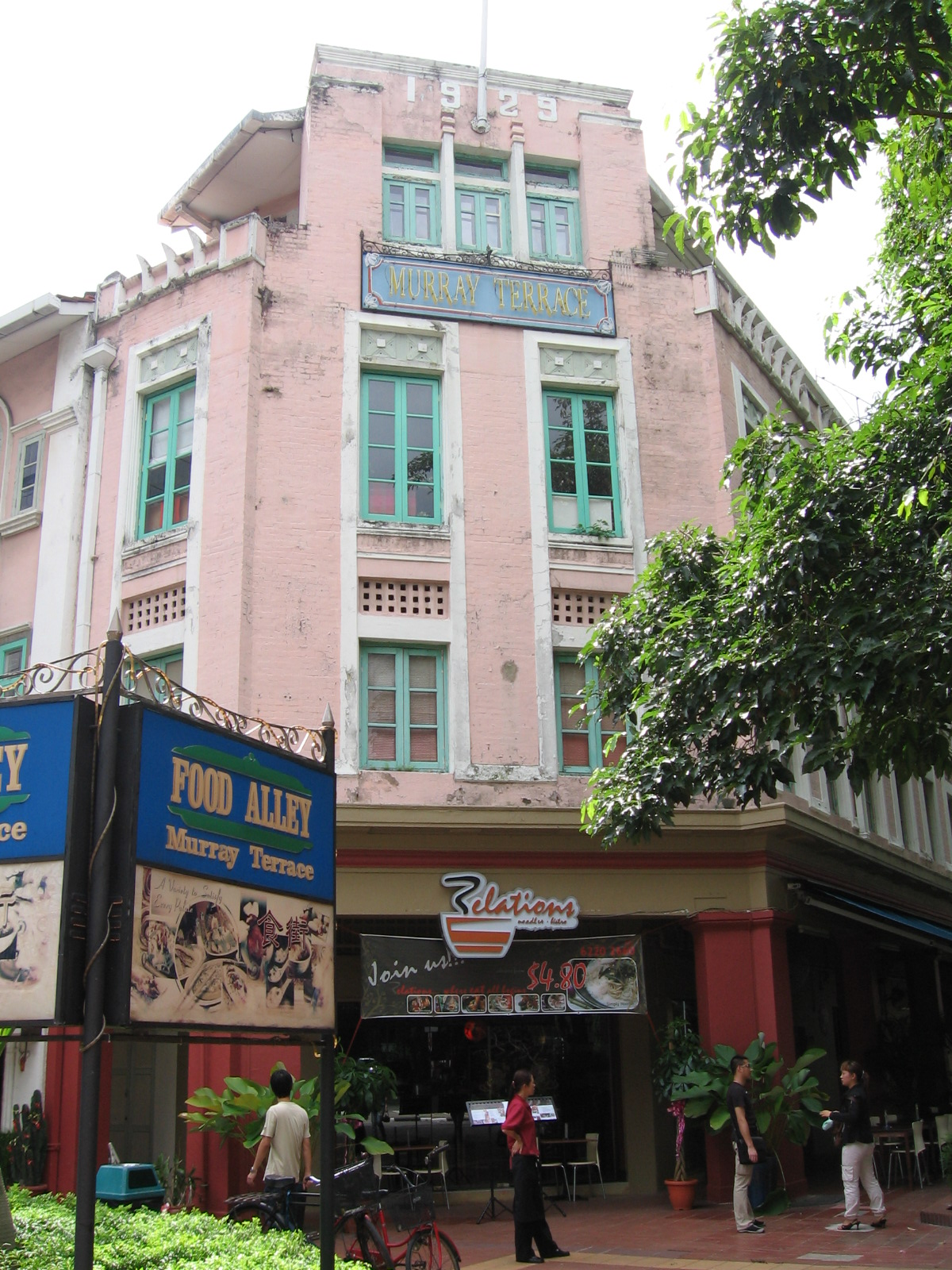
The building in 2006

Murray Terrace is a row of fourteen shophouses along Murray Street in Singapore. It has housed the Murray Terrace Food Alley, offices and the Six Senses Maxwell hotel.

== History ==
The building was likely constructed in 1929 as "1929" was inscribed on the building's fourth floor facing Maxwell Road. It is believed that the building was named after Colonel Alexander Murray, who served as the Surveyor General of the Straits Settlements. The building may have served as an army barracks, as the exterior of the building bears a lion head insignia, as well as a flag post. In 1977, the building was refurbished and began housing the Murray Terrace Food Alley, which was popular with both locals and tourists. However, by the 1990s, most of the popular hawkers within the food alley had moved out. The building was then refurbished as offices. The building was sold by Pidemco Land in December 1996.

In 2012, the building was bought by Satinder Garcha's Elevation group for $75 million in 2012. The Six Senses Maxwell hotel was established in the building in 2018. Evelyn Chen of The Daily Telegraph gave the hotel a rating of 8/10. However, the hotel closed down in 2020 due to the COVID-19 pandemic.
