= Bodi Center =

Skyscraper in Hangzhou, Zhejiang, China

- 博地中心
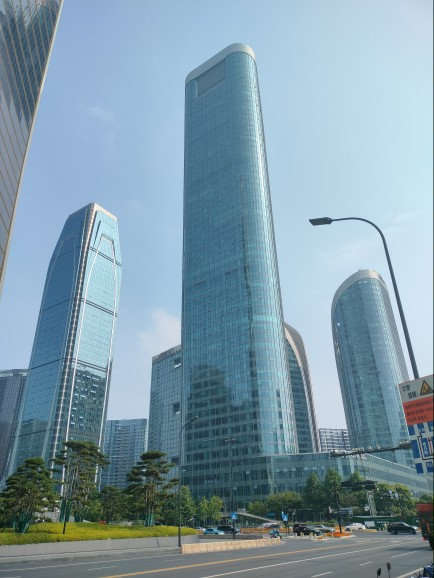
- Interactive map of the Bodi Center area

General information
- Status: Completed
- Type: Mixed-use: Office / Hotel
- Location: Hangzhou, China, 67P3+93F, Qianjiang Century City, Xiaoshan District, Hangzhou
- Coordinates: 30°14′18″N 120°14′54″E
- Construction started: 2013
- Completed: 2017

Height
- Roof: 279.7 m (918 ft) (Tower C); 150.2 m (493 ft) (Tower A); 150.2 m (493 ft) (Tower B)

Technical details
- Structural system: Reinforced concrete
- Floor count: 57 (+3 underground) (Tower C); 34 (Tower A); 33 (Tower B)
- Floor area: 300,000 m^{2} (3,230,000 sq ft) (entire complex)

Design and construction
- Architects: Woods Bagot; B+H Architects (Interiors)
- Developer: Bodi Holdings Group
- Structural engineer: China United Engineering Corporation
- Main contractor: Zhejiang Guotai Construction Group Co., Ltd.

The Bodi Center (Chinese: 博地中心) is a mixed-use skyscraper complex in the Xiaoshan District of Hangzhou, China. Built between 2013 and 2017, the complex consists of three towers, with the tallest standing at 279.7 m (918 ft) tall with 57 floors (Tower C) respectively 150.2 m (493 ft) with 34 and 33 floors (Towers A and B). Tower C is the current 5th tallest building in Hangzhou.

== History ==
The building complex is located in the Xiaoshan District of Hangzhou, adjacent to the Hangzhou Olympic Sports Expo Center and the Yingfeng Station of the Hangzhou Metro Line 2. The complex was developed by the Chinese real estate company of Bodi Group and designed by the Australian studio Woods Bagot.

=== Architecture ===
The complex covers an area of 22,745 m^{2} (245,000 sq ft) and has a total construction area of 300,000 m^{2} (3,230,000 sq ft) usable gross area over all the three towers. It consists of three super high-rise tower buildings, of which Building A is a 33-story office tower, Building B compiling a 34-story office tower sharing its functionality with a five-star hotel. The latter is part of the Radisson Hotel Group brand which was opened in May 2019, which houses a total of 186 rentable units and a banquet and conference hall at the lower levels with a gross usable area of more than 1,000 square meters.) Building C, the main tower of the complex is a 279.7-meter 55-story super high-rise class A office building.

The facades for all of the three towers dispose of a curtain wall glazing system with insulated glass panels. The used glass surfaces are protected by vertical mullions to strengthen their height, while the curved corners enhance aerodynamic impact and views of the surrounding area. A helipad was built on the top of the building which serves for quick transportation.

== Buildings ==
Name	Image	Height m (ft)	Floors	Function
Tower C		279.7 m (918 ft)	57	Office
Tower A		150.2 m (493 ft)	34	Office
Tower B		150.2 m (493 ft)	33	Office/Hotel

== See also ==
- List of tallest buildings in China
- List of tallest buildings in Hangzhou
