= Raffles City =

Raffles City is the name of CapitaLand's flagship mixed used development in Singapore and China.

- Raffles City Singapore
- Raffles City Chongqing
- Raffles City Hangzhou
- Raffles City Shanghai

== See also ==
- Raffles Hotel (disambiguation)
- Raffles (disambiguation)
- CapitaLand, developer of the Raffles City complexes
