= Reinforced concrete column =

A reinforced concrete column is a structural member designed to carry compressive loads, composed of concrete with an embedded steel frame to provide reinforcement. For design purposes, the columns are separated into two categories: short columns and slender columns.

== Short columns ==
The strength of short columns is controlled by the strength of the material and the geometry of the cross section. Reinforcing rebar is placed axially in the column to provide additional axial stiffness. Accounting for the additional stiffness of the steel, the nominal loading capacity P_{n} for the column in terms of the maximum compressive stress of the concrete f_{c}', the yield stress of the steel f_{y}, the gross cross section area of the column A_{g}, and the total cross section area of the steel rebar A_{st}

$$\begin{align}
P_\mathrm{n} &= 0.85f'_\mathrm{c}(A_\mathrm{g} - A_\mathrm{st}) +  A_\mathrm{st}f_\mathrm{y}\\
\end{align}$$

Reinforced Concrete Beam Image

where the first term represents the load carried by the concrete and the second term represents the load carried by the steel. Because the yield strength of steel is an order of magnitude larger than that of concrete, a small addition of steel will greatly increase the strength of the column.

An example of a reinforced concrete column cross section is shown in the figure to the right. Which illustrates the placement of longitudinal reinforcement and the concrete core.

=== Design load ===
To give a conservative estimate and build redundancies into the final structural system, the ACI Building Code Requirements give a maximum reduced design load of $\mathrm{{\phi}P_\mathrm{n}}\,\!$ where $\mathrm{\phi}\,\!$ is the strength reduction factor for the type of column used. For spiral columns

$$\begin{align}
{\phi}P_\mathrm{n(max)} &= 0.85\phi[0.85f'_\mathrm{c}(A_\mathrm{g} - A_\mathrm{st}) +  A_\mathrm{st}f_\mathrm{y}]\\
\end{align}$$

where $\mathrm{\phi} = 0.75\,\!$. For tied columns

$$\begin{align}
{\phi}P_\mathrm{n(max)} &= 0.80\phi[0.85f'_\mathrm{c}(A_\mathrm{g} - A_\mathrm{st}) +  A_\mathrm{st}f_\mathrm{y}]\\
\end{align}$$

where $\mathrm{\phi} = 0.65\,\!$. The additional reduction past the strength reduction factor is to account for any eccentricities in the loading of column. Distributing a load toward one end of the column will produce a moment in the column and prevent the entire cross section from carrying the load, thus producing high stress concentrations towards that end of the column.

==== Spiral columns ====
Spiral columns are cylindrical columns with a continuous helical bar wrapping around the column. The spiral acts to provide support in the transverse direction and prevent the column from barreling. The amount of reinforcement is required to provide additional load-carrying capacity greater than or equal to that attributed from the shell as to compensate for the strength lost when the shell spalls off. With further thickening of the spiral rebar, the axially loaded concrete becomes the weakest link in the system and the strength contribution from the additional rebar does not take effect until the column has failed axially. At that point, the additional strength from spiral reinforcement engages and prevents catastrophic failure, instead giving rise to a much slower ductile failure.

The ACI Building Code Requirements put the following restrictions on amount of spiral reinforcement.

ACI Code 7.10.4.2: For cast-in-place construction, size of spirals shall not be less than 3/8 in. diameter.

ACI Code 7.10.4.3: Clear spacing between spirals shall not exceed 3 in., nor be less than 1in.

Section 10.9.3 adds an additional lower limit to the amount of spiral reinforcement via the volumetric spiral reinforcement ratio ρ_{s}.

$${\rho}_{s} = 0.45 \left( \frac{A_g}{A_{ch}} - 1 \right) \frac{f'_c}{f_{yt}}$$

where A_{ch} is the shell area, the cross-sectional area measured to the outside edges of transverse reinforcement. P = f/A

==== Tied columns ====
Tied columns have closed lateral ties spaced approximately uniformly across the column. The spacing of the ties is limited in that they must be close enough to prevent barreling failure between them, and far enough apart that they do not interfere with the setting of the concrete. The ACI codebook puts an upward limit on the spacing between ties.

ACI Code 7.10.5: Vertical spacing of ties shall not exceed 16 longitudinal bar diameters, 48 tie bar or wire diameters, or least dimension of the compression member.

If the ties are spaced too far apart, the column will experience shearfailure and barrel in between the ties.

== Slender columns ==
Columns qualify as being slender when their cross sectional area is very small in proportion to their length. Unlike Short Columns, Slender Columns are limited by their geometry and will buckle before the concrete or steel reinforcement yields.

== Nonlinear simulation of columns ==
There are some analytical stress-strain models and damage indices for confined and unconfined concrete to simulate reinforced concrete columns, which make it possible, without any experimental test to evaluate the stress-strain relationship and damage of confined and unconfined concretes situated inside and outside of stirrups.

== Machine learning prediction of column failure mode ==
Machine learning (ML) is a subfield of artificial intelligence (AI) and an advanced form of data analysis and computation that employs the high elaboration speed and pattern recognition techniques of computers for knowledge output from data. In other words, it is a computer programming technique inspired by AI that allows computers to improve their learning abilities through data supplies or data access. This resembles the way human beings improve their intelligence in real life. There are four generalized categories of ML. To be more specific, there is supervised learning, semi-supervised learning, unsupervised learning and reinforcement learning. In supervised learning, the desired output is known by the trainer, where the trainer is the human being that can ascribe physical meaning to the data and characterize it by adding a tag or correcting system errors. The machine is trained based on inputs with tags that are connected to a corresponding output. Through this process, the machine develops a predictive model for the connection of this input to a certain output. This does not differ from the way that knowledge is learned in a classroom, with a teacher available to correct any errors. The mode of failure of structural members, such as reinforced concrete columns, depends on several factors, such as their geometric characteristics, the longitudinal reinforcement, the efficiency of confinement through the transverse reinforcement and the loading history. Their behavior throughout the loading range is controlled by competing mechanisms of resistance such as flexure, shear, buckling of longitudinal bars when they are subjected to compressive loads and, in the case of lap splices, the lap splice mechanism of the development of reinforcing bars. Very often, a combination of such mechanisms characterizes the macroscopic behavior of the column, especially in cases of cyclic load reversals. Various predictive models have been developed in the past to determine both the strength as well as the deformation capacity of the columns, with the uncertainty being at least one order of magnitude greater in terms of deformation capacity rather than strength, as evidenced by comparisons with test results. System identification and damage detection is a twofold area that utilizes ML to imitate a structural system and predict its deterministic seismic response. Laboratory tests of reinforced concrete (RC) structures have provided one source of data that enables ML methods to identify their failure modes, strength, capacities and constitutive behaviors
