= Qianjiang Century City =

Business district in China

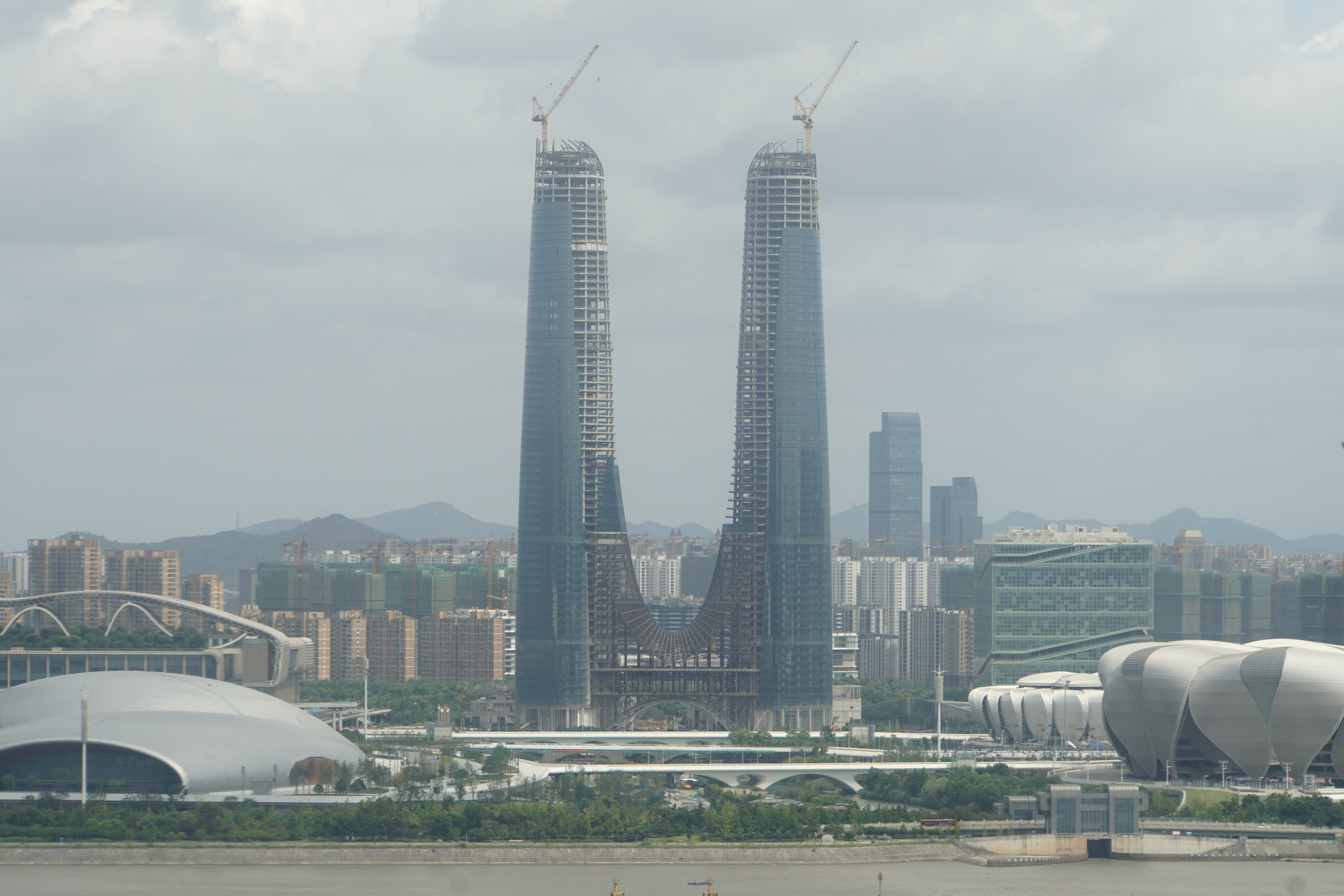
Greenland Hangzhou Centre(u/c) of Qianjiang Century City, is the future tallest building in Hangzhou

Qianjiang Century City (Chinese: 钱江世纪城) is a central business district under construction, located in Ningwei Street, Xiaoshan District, southeast of Qiantang River, Hangzhou, Zhejiang Province, China. The total planned area is 22.27 square kilometers and the planned population is 160,000. The core area is 9.6 square kilometers.

Century City is located in the Jiangbin area of Xiaoshan City, facing Qianjiang New City across the river. From the northwest to the Qiantang River, southwest to the Qijia Gate - Limin River, northeast to Hangzhou-Ningbo Expressway, south to the former Jiefang River, east to Liqun River and Shixin Road.

In 2003, the Management Committee of Qianjiang Century City was established. The construction started in 2008.

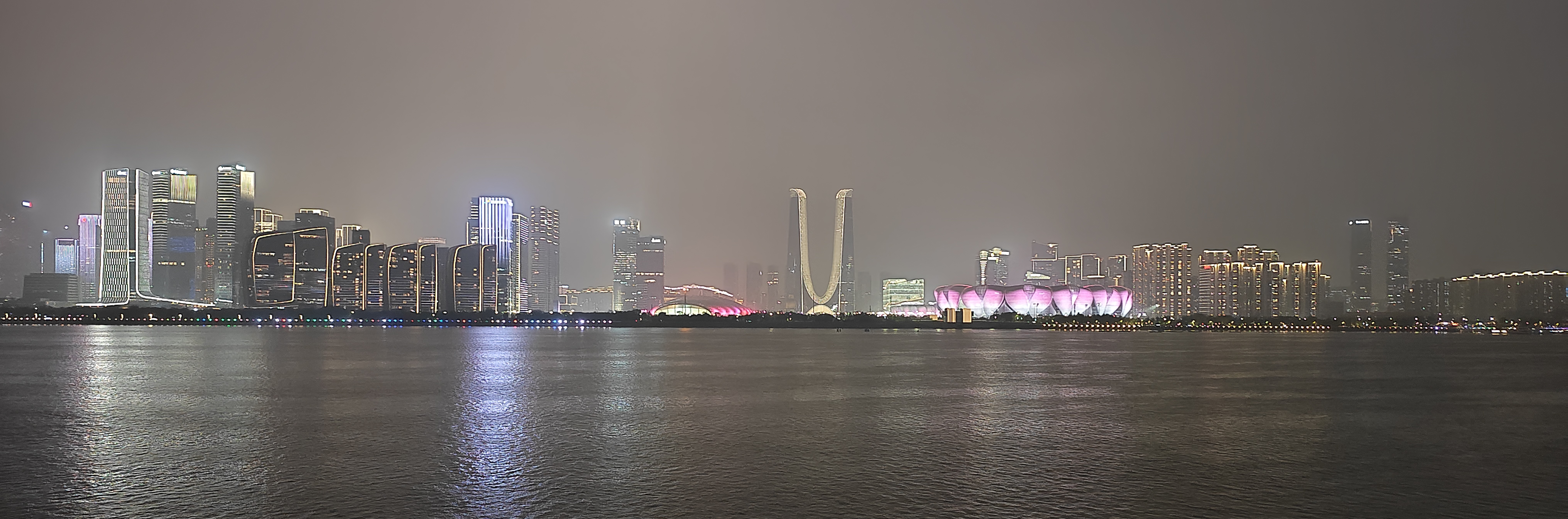
Qianjiang Century City at night in 2026

== Economy ==
By the end of April 2018, more than 5,000 enterprises had settled in Century City.

== Buildings ==
- Hangzhou Sports Park Stadium
- Hangzhou Olympic Sports Expo Center
- Regent International Center

== Transportation ==
The Qianjiang Third Bridge connects the Century City with the old city area of Hangzhou on the opposite bank, along with the Qingshui River Tunnel. Additionally, the Hangzhou Airport Expressway, located to the south of Century City, links the new city with downtown Hangzhou and the Xiaoshan International Airport. The Hangzhou Metro Line 2 has a station known as Qianjiang Century City Station, providing access to Xiaoshan and Jianggan.

== Education ==
There will be 1 senior high school, 3 junior high schools and 8 primary schools.

== See also ==
- Qianjiang New City
- Qianjiang Century City station
