= Qianjiang New City =

Area of Hangzhou, China

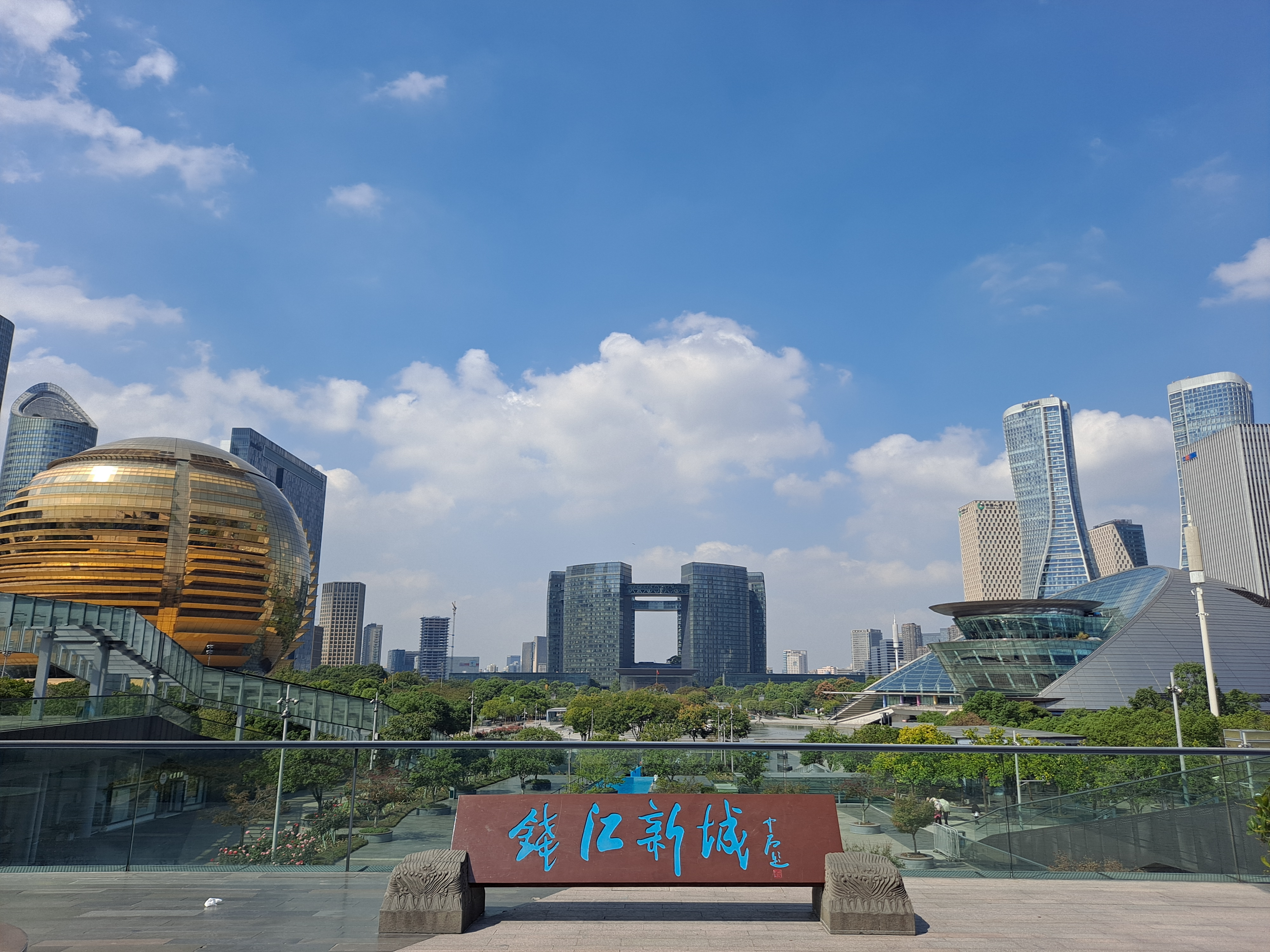
- Logo
- Simplified Chinese: 钱江新城
Transcriptions
Standard Mandarin
- Hanyu Pinyin: Qiánjiāng Xīnchéng
- Wade–Giles: Ch'ien-chiang Hsin-ch'eng

Qianjiang New City or Hangzhou CBD (杭州CBD, Hángzhōu CBD) is a central business district situated in the west bank of Qiantang River in downtown Hangzhou, Zhejiang Province, China. Construction work of this district began in 2007, being a significant part of Hangzhou's resolution of expansion from "West-Lake-centered era" to "Qiantang-River-centered era". It is currently one of two central business districts and the financial district of Hangzhou city.

Iconic architecture in the district includes the heaven-and-earth Civic Center, the golden-egg-shaped Hangzhou Intercontinental Hotel, the moon-shaped Grand Theater, and the City Balcony and Raffles City shopping mall. The Civic Center has been the main location for Hangzhou's municipal government since 2016.

Line 1, Line 2, Line 4, Line 7 and Line 9 of Hangzhou Metro are currently serving the area.
