= List of universities in Cambodia =

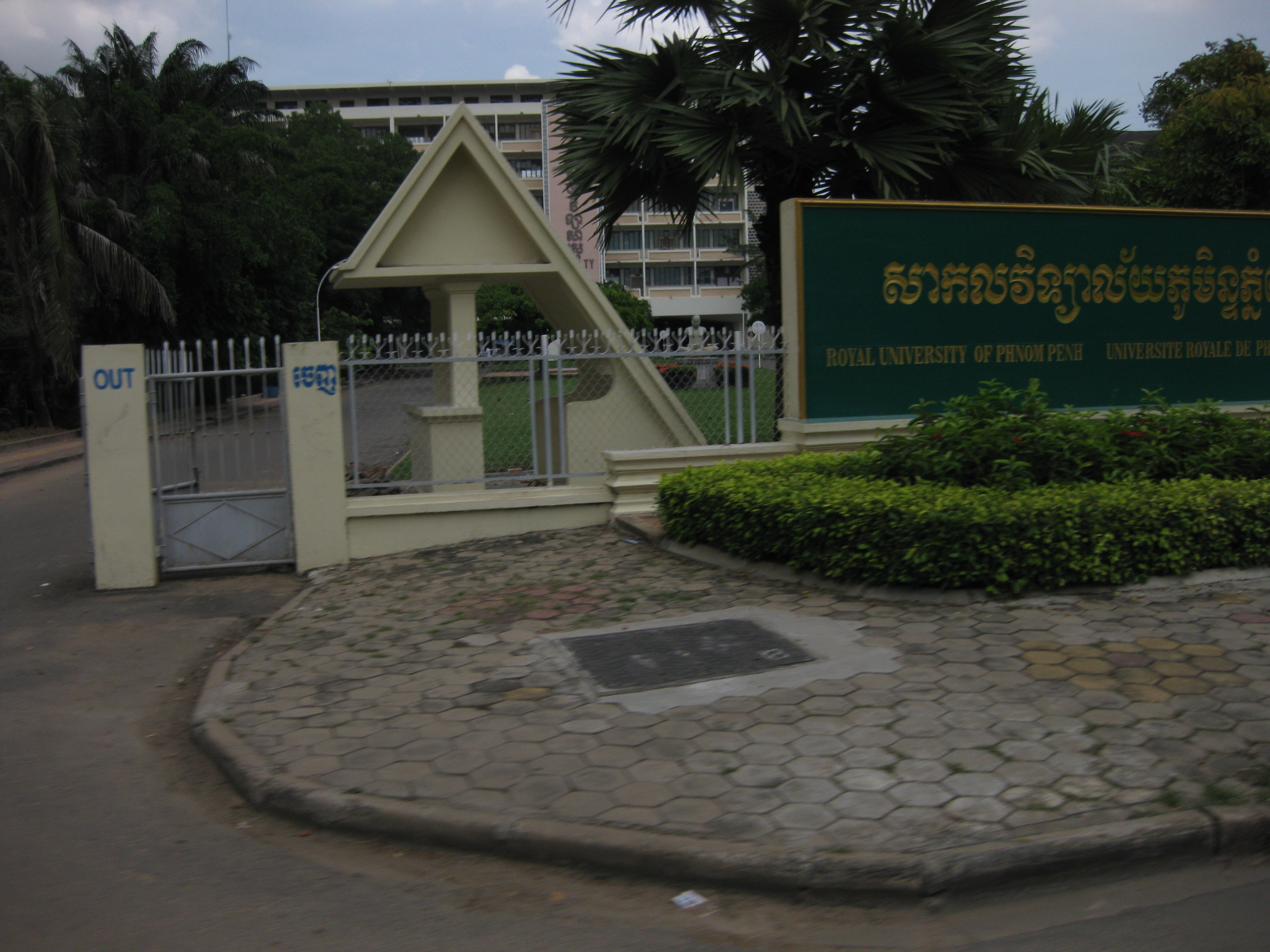
Royal University of Phnom Penh (RUPP) is the largest university in Cambodia.

This is a list of universities in Cambodia.

This is the list of universities in Cambodia according to the Cambodian Ministry of Education, Youth, and Sport. The Cambodian formal education system ceased to exist and many educated people fled the country or died during the Khmer Rouge era (1975–1979). After the fall of the Khmer Rouge, the education system had to be rebuilt from scratch to become what the modern national education system is today, starting from Grade 1 (at age six) to Grade 12 for a total of 12 years of public general education. Exams are held for any potential students to enter higher education institutions and continue their studies.

== Public universities ==
Institution	Abbrev.	Established	Location	School Website
Royal Academy of Cambodia; Académie Royale du Cambodge រាជបណ្ឌិត្យសភាកម្ពុជា	RAC	1965	Phnom Penh, Cambodia	http://www.rac.gov.kh/
Royal School of Administration; École Royale d'Administration សាលាភូមិន្ទរដ្ឋបាល	ERA	1956	Phnom Penh, Cambodia	http://era.gov.kh/
Cambodian Agricultural Research and Development Institute; Institut Cambodgien de la Recherche Agricole et Développement វិទ្យាស្ថានស្រាវជ្រាវ និង អភិវឌ្ឍកសិកម្មកម្ពុជា	CARDI		Phnom Penh, Cambodia	http://www.cardi.org.kh/
Institute of Technology of Cambodia; Institut de Technologie du Cambodge វិទ្យាស្ថានបច្ចេកវិទ្យាកម្ពុជា	ITC	1964	Phnom Penh, Cambodia; Tboung Khmum Province	https://www.itc.edu.kh/
Chea Sim University of Kamchay Mear (formerly Maharishi Vedic University); Université Chea Sim de Kamchay Mear សាកលវិទ្យាល័យ ជាស៊ីម កំចាយមារ	CSUK	1992	Prey Veng Province; Kamchay Mear District	http://csuk.edu.kh/
National Institute of Education (Cambodia); Institut National de l'Éducation វិទ្យាស្ថានជាតិអប់រំ	NIE	1991	Phnom Penh, Cambodia	http://www.nie.edu.kh/
National Polytechnic Institute of Cambodia; Institut National Polytechnique du Cambodge វិទ្យាស្ថានជាតិពហុបច្ចេកទេសកម្ពុជា	NPIC	2005	Phnom Penh, Cambodia	https://npic.edu.kh/en/
National Technical Training Institute; Institut National de Formation Technique វិទ្យាស្ថានជាតិបណ្តុះបណ្តាលបច្ចេកទេស	NTTI	1999	Phnom Penh, Cambodia	https://www.ntti.edu.kh/
National University of Management; Université Nationale de Gestion សាកលវិទ្យាល័យជាតិគ្រប់គ្រង	NUM	1983	Phnom Penh, Cambodia	https://num.edu.kh/web/web/num/home
Prek Leap national institute of agriculture Institut national d'agriculture de Prek Leap វិទ្យាស្ថានជាតិកសិកម្មព្រែកលៀប	PNIA	1948	Phnom Penh, Cambodia	https://nia.edu.kh/
Royal University of Agriculture; Université Royale d'Agriculture សាកលវិទ្យាល័យភូមិន្ទកសិកម្ម	RUA	1964	Phnom Penh, Cambodia	http://www.rua.edu.kh/
Royal University of Fine Arts; Université Royale des Beaux-Arts សាកលវិទ្យាល័យភូមិន្ទវិចិត្រសិល្បៈ	RUFA	1917	Phnom Penh, Cambodia	https://www.rufa.edu.kh/
Royal University of Law and Economics; Université Royale de Droit et des Sciences Économiques សាកលវិទ្យាល័យភូមិន្ទនីតិសាស្រ្ត និង វិទ្យាសាស្រ្តសេដ្ឋកិច្ច	RULE	1948	Phnom Penh, Cambodia	https://rule.edu.kh/
Royal University of Phnom Penh; Université Royale de Phnom Penh សាកលវិទ្យាល័យភូមិន្ទភ្នំពេញ	RUPP	1960 (Jan 13)	Phnom Penh, Cambodia	http://www.rupp.edu.kh/
Svay Rieng University; Université de Svay Rieng សាកលវិទ្យាល័យស្វាយរៀង	SRU	2006 (Jan 25)	Svay Rieng Province; Svay Rieng	https://sru.edu.kh/
University of Health Sciences; Université des Sciences de la Santé សាកលវិទ្យាល័យវិទ្យាសាស្រ្តសុខាភិបាល	UHS	1946	Phnom Penh, Cambodia	https://uhs.edu.kh/
Meanchey University; Université de Mean Chey សាកលវិទ្យាល័យមានជ័យ	MUC	2007 (Feb 20)	Banteay Meanchey Province; Sisophon	
University of Battambang; Université de Battambang សាកលវិទ្យាល័យនៃបាត់ដំបង	UBB	2007	Battambang Province; Battambang	http://nubb.edu.kh/en/
National Institute of Business; Institut National d'Affaires វិទ្យាស្ថានជាតិពាណិជ្ជសាស្រ្ត	NIB	1979	Phnom Penh, Cambodia	http://www.nib.edu.kh/
Preah Kossomak Polytechnic Institute វិទ្យាស្ថានពហុបច្ចេកទេសព្រះកុសុមៈ	PPI	1965 [2001]	Phnom Penh, Cambodia	https://ppiedu.com/
Industrial Technical Institute វិទ្យាស្ថានបច្ចេកទេសឧស្សាហកម្ម	ITI	1928	Phnom Penh, Cambodia	
Cambodia Academy of Digital Technology (Formerly NIPTIC) បណ្ឌិតសភាបច្ចេកវិទ្យាឌីជីថលកម្ពុជា	CADT	2014	Phnom Penh, Cambodia	https://www.cadt.edu.kh/

== Private universities ==
Institution	Abbrev.	Established	Location	Website
American University of Phnom Penh សាកលវិទ្យាល័យអាមេរិកាំងភ្នំពេញ	AUPP	2013	Phnom Penh, Cambodia	https://www.aupp.edu.kh/
City University, Cambodia	CU	2005	Phnom Penh, Cambodia	https://cityuniversity.education/
Phnom Penh International University (formerly ASEAN University) សាកលវិទ្យាល័យភ្នំពេញអន្តរជាតិ	PPIU	2002 [2006]	Phnom Penh, Cambodia	https://www.ppiu.edu.kh/public/
Dewey International University សាកលវិទ្យាល័យអន្តរជាតិឌូវី	DIU	2010	Battambang, Cambodia	http://diu.edu.kh/diu/
Beltei International University សាកលវិទ្យាល័យប៊ែលធីអន្តរជាតិ	BELTEI	2012 (Sep 6)	Phnom Penh, Cambodia	https://www.beltei.edu.kh/biue/index.php
Build Bright University សាកលវិទ្យាល័យបៀលប្រាយ	BBU	2000	Phnom Penh, Cambodia	https://www.bbu.edu.kh/
IIC University of Technology	IIC	1999	Phnom Penh, Cambodia	http://www.iic.edu.kh/
Paññāsāstra University of Cambodia សាកលវិទ្យាល័យបញ្ញាសាស្ត្រ	PUC	1997	Phnom Penh, Cambodia	http://www.puc.edu.kh/
Norton University សាកលវិទ្យាល័យន័រតុន	NU	1996	Phnom Penh, Cambodia	https://www.norton-u.com/
University of Management and Economics (formerly Institute of Management and Economics; IME) សាកលវិទ្យាល័យគ្រប់គ្រង និងសេដ្ឋកិច្ច	UME	2000 (Jul 17)	Main Campus: Battambang Province; Branch Campuses: Pursat, Kampot, Sihanoukville, Kampong Cham, Banteay Meanchey, Koh Kong, Kratie	https://www.ume.edu.kh/
International University សាកលវិទ្យាល័យអន្តរជាតិ	IU	2002 (Sep)	Phnom Penh, Cambodia	https://www.iu.edu.kh/
Cambodian University of Specialties សាកលវិទ្យាល័យឯកទេសកម្ពុជា	CUS	2002	Phnom Penh, Cambodia	https://cus.edu.kh/
Chamroeun University of Poly-Technology សាកលវិទ្យាល័យចំរើនពហុបច្ចេកវិទ្យា	CUP	2002	Phnom Penh, Cambodia	
Economics and Finance Institute វិទ្យាស្ថានសេដ្ឋកិច្ចនិងហិរញ្ញវត្ថុ	EFI	2002	Phnom Penh, Cambodia	https://efi.mef.gov.kh/
University of Cambodia សាកលវិទ្យាល័យកម្ពុជា	UC	2003	Phnom Penh, Cambodia	https://uc.edu.kh/
Asia Euro University សាកលវិទ្យាល័យអាស៊ីអឺរ៉ុប	AEU	2003	Phnom Penh, Cambodia	http://www.aeu.edu.kh/
Western University សាកលវិទ្យាល័យវេស្ទើន	WU	2003 (17 Nov)	Phnom Penh, Cambodia	http://www.western.edu.kh/
Khemarak University សាកលវិទ្យាល័យខេមរៈ	KU	2004	Phnom Penh, Cambodia	
Angkor University សាកលវិទ្យាល័យអង្គរ	AU	2004 (Jul 23)	Siem Reap, Cambodia	https://www.angkor.edu.kh/
Human Resources University សាកលវិទ្យាល័យធនធានមនុស្ស	HRU	2005	Phnom Penh, Cambodia	https://www.hru.edu.kh/en/
University of Southeast Asia សាកលវិទ្យាល័យសៅស៏អ៊ីសថ៏អេសៀ	USEA	2006 (July 7)	Siem Reap, Cambodia	https://www.hru.edu.kh/en/
University of Puthisastra សាកលវិទ្យាល័យពុទ្ធិសាស្ត្រ	UP	2000	Phnom Penh, Cambodia	https://www.puthisastra.edu.kh/
Chenla University សាកលវិទ្យាល័យចេនឡា	CLU	2007	Phnom Penh, Cambodia	
Limkokwing University of Creative Technology សាកលវិទ្យាល័យ លឹមកុកវីង	LKU	2008	Phnom Penh, Cambodia	https://www.limkokwing.net/
Angkor Khemara University សាកលវិទ្យាល័យអង្គរខេមរា	AKU	2008	Takéo, Pursat, Kampong Speu, Kampot	
Khmer University of Technology and Management សាកលវិទ្យាល័យខ្មែរបច្ចេកវិទ្យា និងគ្រប់គ្រង	KUTM	2008	Sihanoukville, Cambodia	
Panha Chiet University សាកលវិទ្យាល័យបញ្ញាជាតិ	PCU	2009	Phnom Penh, Cambodia	
East Asia Management University សាកលវិទ្យាល័យគ្រប់គ្រងអាស៊ីបូព៑ា	EAMU	2018	Phnom Penh, Cambodia	http://www.eamu.edu.kh/
Phnom Penh Institute of Technology プノンペン科学技術大学 វិទ្យាស្ថានបច្ចេកវិទ្យាភ្នំពេញ	PPIT	2012	Phnom Penh, Cambodia	https://www.ppiu.edu.kh/public/
CamEd Business School វ់ទ្យាស្ថាន ខេមអេដ	CamEd	2000	Phnom Penh, Cambodia	https://cam-ed.com/
Saint Paul Institute; Institut Saint Paul វិទ្យាស្ថាន សន្តប៉ូល	SPI	2009	Takéo Province, Cambodia	https://spi.edu.kh/
Cambodian Mekong University; Université cambodgienne du Mékong	CMU	2003	Phnom Penh, Cambodia	
Vanda Institute វ់ទ្យាស្ថាន វ៉ាន់ដា	VI	2001	Phnom Penh, Cambodia	http://vanda.edu.kh/
Paragon International University សាកលវិទ្យាល័យអន្តរជាតិផារ៉ាហ្កន	Paragon.U	2010	Phnom Penh, Cambodia	https://paragoniu.edu.kh/
Phnom Penh International Institute of the Arts វិទ្យាស្ថានសិល្បៈភ្នំពេញអន្តរជាតិ	PPIIA	2013	Phnom Penh, Cambodia	https://ppiia.edu.kh/
Life University សាកលវិទ្យាល័យឡាយ	LU	2007	Sihanoukville, Cambodia	https://www.lifeun.edu.kh/
Institute of Professional Accounting វិទ្យាស្ថាន ជំនាញគណនេយ្យ	IPA	1983, 2012 (Jan 1, Siem Reap)	Phnom Penh, Siem Reap	
Kirirom Institute of Technology វិទ្យាស្ថានបច្ចេកវិទ្យាគីរីរម្យ	KIT	2014	Kirirom National Park, Kampong Speu, Cambodia	https://kit.edu.kh/
ACLEDA Institute of Business វិទ្យាស្ថាន ពាណិជ្ជសាស្រ្ត អេស៊ីលីដា	AIB	2016	Phnom Penh, Cambodia	https://acleda-aib.edu.kh/tc/eng/
University of Economics and Finance សាកលវិទ្យាល័យសេដ្ឋកិច្ចនិងហិរញ្ញវត្ថុ	UEF	2011	Phnom Penh, Cambodia	https://www.uef.edu.kh/
De Montfort University Cambodia (1st British University Campus in Cambodia)	DMUC	2023	Phnom Penh, Cambodia	https://dmuc.edu.kh/

== See also ==
- Education in Cambodia
- Ministry of Education, Youth and Sport, of Cambodia
- Accreditation Committee of Cambodia
