= Accreditation Committee of Cambodia =

Cambodian government education and assessment body

The Accreditation Committee of Cambodia (ACC; Khmer: គណៈកម្មាធិការទទួលស្គាល់គុណភាពអប់រំនៃកម្ពុជា) is a national higher education quality and assessment body of Cambodia. The ACC was established in Phnom Penh in March 2003 under the supervision of the Council of Ministers chaired by the Deputy Prime Minister Sok An to develop the standard of education in Cambodia.

== Institutions ==
Partial list of higher education institutions in Cambodia supervised by the ACC:

- Asean University (now PPIU)AU
- Asia-Europe University AEU
- Angkor University
- Build Bright University BBU
- Cambodian Mekong University CMU
- Chamroeun University of Polytechnic CUP
- City University, Cambodia CU
- Cambodian University of Specialization CUS
- Economics and Finance Institute
- International University, Cambodia
- International Institute of Cambodia IIC
- Institute for Business Education (formerly SITC) IBE
- Institute of Cambodia
- Institute of Technology of Cambodia ITC
- Institute of the Town of Angkor
- Institute of European Union
- Khemarak University
- Moyarishi Vedic University
- Norton University NU
- Newton Thilay University NTU
- National University of Management NUM
- National Institute of Posts, Telecoms and ICT NIPTICT
- Panha Chiet University PCU
- Pannasastra University of Cambodia PUC
- Royal University of Phnom Penh RUPP
- Royal University of Agriculture RUA
- Royal University of Fine Arts RUFA
- Royal University of Law and Economics RULE
- Royal Academy of Cambodia
- Setec University SU
- Svay Rieng University SRU
- University of Cambodia UC
- University of Human Resources
- University of Law and Economics
- University of Management and Economics UME
- University of Puthisastra UP
- University of Technology of Phnom Penh
- University Health Sciences
- Vanda Institute of Accounting VIA
- Western University WU
- Wan Lan University
- Zaman University ZAMANU
- Phnom Penh International University - PPIU PPIU
