= Assistance of Education in Cambodia =

Organization

NGO Education Partnership (NEP) is a membership organisation that encourages active teamwork and alliance between NGOs working toward a greater cause for Cambodia’s education system, and also advocates on behalf of its member organisations in discussions and debates with the Ministry of Education Youth and Sports (MoEYS) in Cambodia. NEP aims to create an environment where different NGOs with the same goal, improving education in Cambodia, can come together to discuss contemporary issues. In addition, NEP aims to serve as an intermediary where problems identified by the various member NGOs can be conveyed to authorities governing education in Cambodia. This helps MoEYS receive positive inputs from organisations that care and would facilitate them making more informed decisions at improving the education welfare in Cambodia. Currently, NEP has 105 NGO members and the number is increasing. USAID is supporting Cambodia’s efforts to improve education. With a 97 percent primary net enrollment rate in 2020, MoEYS is close to achieving universal access to primary education.

== Vision and Mission ==
The vision for NEP is “Working together to achieve equal and timely access to high quality education for all Cambodian people” and the mission of NEP is “coordinating dialogue and cooperation among key stakeholders to improve the quality and accessibility of education in Cambodia”.

== Achievements ==
In 2008, NEP, together with the Voluntary Service Overseas (VSO), published a policy report on the motivation and morale of teachers in Cambodia. In the report, it was found that the three biggest impediments faced by teachers in Cambodia are being underpaid, under-supported and working in under-resourced schools. Teachers in Cambodia earn an average of US$30–$60/month and most are forced to hold second jobs to sustain their living. Through the findings in the report, NEP negotiated with the Ministry of Education in Cambodia on ways to improve motivation and participation among teachers in Cambodia. Key recommendations to the government included increasing the salaries of teachers, letting teachers undergo training and self-improvements, strengthening communication between the management of schools and teachers and the passing and implementation of the anti-corruption law in public schools.

The Global Campaign for Education (GCE) is an advocacy movement with the purpose of achieving the Education for All (EFA) goals by 2015. Since 2007, NEP has been a member of GCE and has been organising and contributing to this campaign annually. This includes working in collaboration with other member NGOs and implementing the Global Action Week – Education For All Week in April/May annually. Through such campaigns and active movements, NEP is able to further raise awareness on the importance of obtaining proper education in modern Cambodia. Apart from that, education topics can be discussed with governmental officials from the MoEYS and issues could be brought to their attention through the events organised by GCE. In a sense, NEP aims to exert public pressure on government organisations which promised to fulfill educational improvements in Cambodia.

Improving Basic Education in Cambodia Project(IBECP) . Started in May 2011 and ended in September 2011, NEP collaborated with World Education to implement the ConnectEd program to address factors limiting the work and life options of disadvantaged youth, with an emphasis on girls and women. The aim of the project is to help disadvantaged youths in rural parts of Cambodia receive training on life skills and thus giving them a better opportunity of being employed in society.

The Securing the Right to Education for All Project started in May 2011 and is currently on-going. Funded by ActionAid Cambodia, the purpose of the project is to secure free and compulsory quality public education for all, with schools being key institutions of the state (core responsibility) that can be held accountable.

== Board Members ==
The current board members are Kou Boun Kheang (Chairman), Richard Geeves (Deputy Chairman), Regina Pellicore (Treasurer), Kila Reimer and Kurt Bredenberg (Board members).
