= CMU =

CMU may refer to:

== Universities ==
=== Asia ===
- Cambodian Mekong University in Phnom Penh, Cambodia
- Capital Medical University in Beijing, China
- Central Mindanao University in Maramag, Bukidnon, Philippines
- Chiang Mai University in Chiangmai, Thailand
- China Medical University (Liaoning) in Shenyang, Liaoning, China
- China Medical University (Taiwan) in Taichung, Taiwan
- Chittagong Medical University in Chittagong, Bangladesh

=== North America ===
- California Miramar University in San Diego, California, United States
- Canadian Mennonite University in Winnipeg, Manitoba, Canada
- Caribbean Maritime University in Kingston, Jamaica
- Caribbean Medical University in Curaçao
- Carnegie Mellon University in Pittsburgh, Pennsylvania, United States
- Central Methodist University in Fayette, Missouri, United States
- Central Michigan University in Mount Pleasant, Michigan, United States
- Colorado Mesa University in Grand Junction, Colorado, United States

=== Other regions ===
- Cardiff Metropolitan University in Cardiff, Wales, United Kingdom

== Other uses ==
- Charge Maximale d'Utilisation, i.e. Safe Working Load (SWL) or Working Load Limit (WLL), the maximum load which may be applied to a given product or component
- Coffman Memorial Union, the student activity center at the University of Minnesota
- Couverture maladie universelle, a French public health program
- Complete Music Update (aka College Music Update), a music business news service
- Communications management unit, a portion of a United States federal prison facility that restricts an inmate's access to other inmates and ability to communicate with the outside world
- Concrete masonry unit, a concrete "block" used in construction
- Capacity Market Unit, a term used in an Electricity market
- Capital Markets Union
