= Petra Christian University =

Private university located in Surabaya, Indonesia

- Universitas Kristen Petra
- Seal
- Motto: Latin: Amor, Integritas, Incrementum, Humilitas et Veritas
- Motto in English: Let Your LIGHT Shine (LIGHT: Love, Integrity, Growth, Humility & Truth)
- Type: Private
- Established: 1961
- Affiliations: YPTK Petra
- Religious affiliation: Protestant
- President: Hary Sudjoko Listijo
- Vice-president: Yos Handarto Poernomo
- Provost: Rudy Setiawan, S.T., M.T.
- Rector: Ir. Djwantoro Hardjito
- Students: 8,805
- Undergraduates: 8,002
- Postgraduates: 803
- Location: Siwalankerto 103 - 144, Surabaya, East Java, 60236, Indonesia; 7°20′22.1″S 112°44′15.1″E
- Campus: Urban
- Student newspaper: Dwi Pekan Online
Colors
The University: Sapphire blue
Faculty of Humanities and Creative Industry
Faculty of Civil and Planning
Faculty of Industrial Technology
Faculty of Economics
Faculty of Education
- Website: petra.ac.id

- UK Petra location

Petra Christian University (Indonesian: Universitas Kristen Petra) abbreviated as UKP or PCU, is a private Christian university in Indonesia, located in Wonocolo District in Surabaya, East Java. It was established in 1961, founded by PPPK Petra, an educational Christian based in Surabaya which established in 1951. The Petra name itself is taken from the Greek language that translates as coral reef or rock. It is Indonesia's best private university in the 2018-2021 QS World University Rankings and stands out as the only private university in Indonesia to make the top 10.

== History ==
The newest Block-Q building completed in 2017, The house of The Faculty of Humanities and Creative Industry

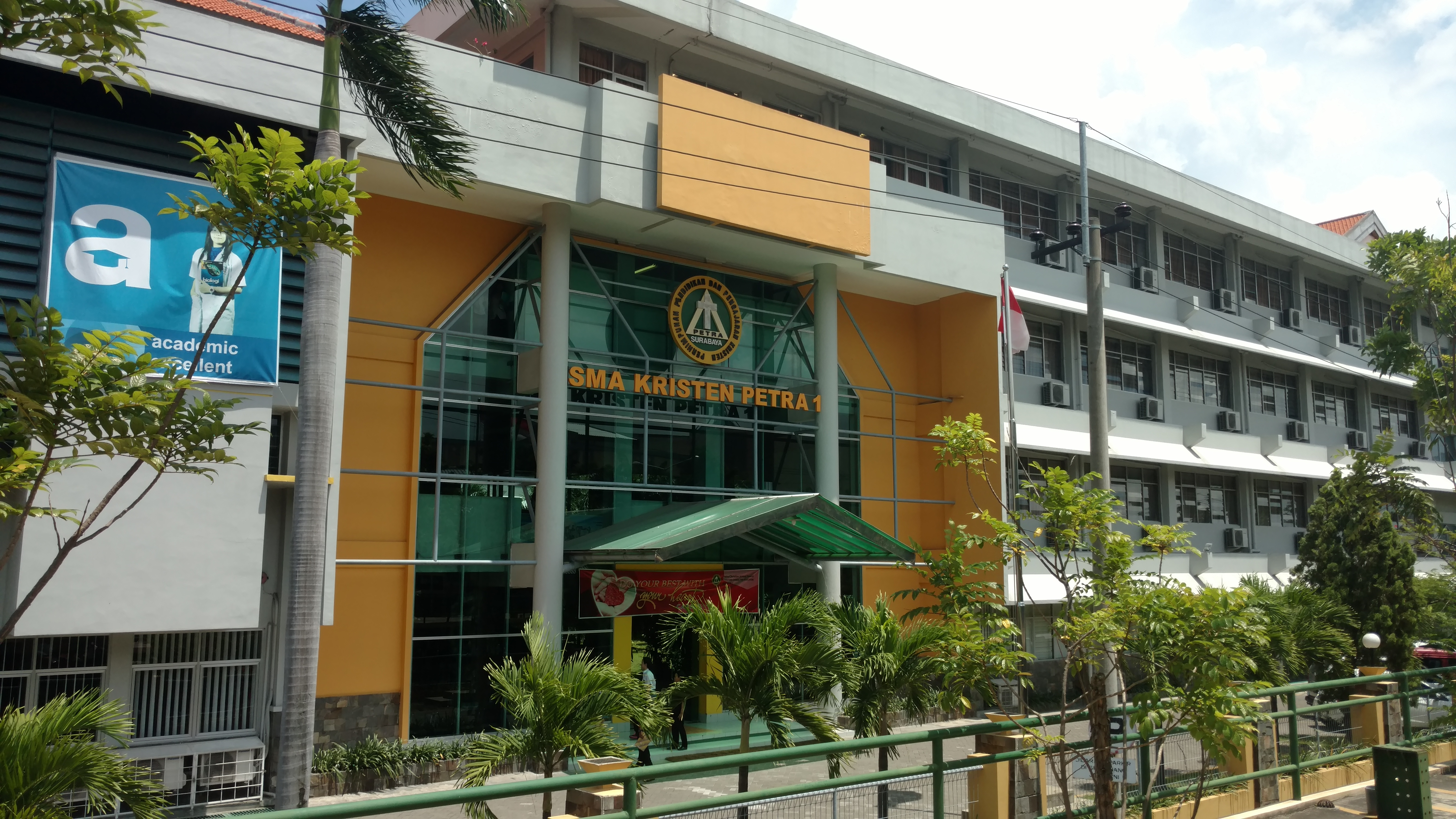
PPPK Petra highschools (Perhimpunan Pendidikan dan Pengajaran Kristen)

The establishment of Petra Christian University was associated with the Petra Christian Education and Teaching Association or PPPK Petra (Perhimpunan Pendidikan dan Pengajaran Kristen). PPPK Petra is a Christian based educational foundation established on 12 April 1951 in Surabaya, East Java, with the purpose to provide education from kindergarten to senior high school.

The idea of establishing a university to provide higher education for the alumni of PPPK Petra highschools has existed since 1956.

On 21 September 1960, a committee known as the University Establishment Planning Preparation Committee was established, which had the responsibility of preparing all the necessary documents in order to establish a university. The members of the committee were: drg. Tan Tjiaw Yong, Gouw Loe Liong, drg. Tan Gie Djien, Tjoa Siok Tjoen, Lie Ping Lioe and Kwee Djien Kian. On 8 August 1961, the coordinators decided to establish Petra Christian University with its first department, Faculty of Letters.

On 22 September 1961, the 10th anniversary PPPK Petra, the establishment of Petra Christian University was made public. Several days later, on 28 September 1961, the coordinators of PPPK Petra formed the Directorate of University Affairs, whose duty was to manage the university and temporarily to act as Sponsor Board members. The members of the directorate were drg. Tan Tjiaw Yong, Ir. O.F. Patty, dr. Mesakh Wignjohoesodo, Gouw Loe Liong and J.A. Sereh. A year later, on 15 September 1962, the second faculty was established, the Faculty of Civil Engineering and Planning.

Realizing the growth of the university, the coordinators re-evaluated the internal regulation of PPPK. On 18 July 1964, a committee for the establishment of Petra Christian University Foundation was set up with the members of the committee, Jacob Elfinus Sahetapy, drg. Tan Tjiaw Yong, dr. M. Wignjohoesodo, Kho Hong Pie, R.M.S. Kertonadi and P.H. Saroinsong. The concept of the Petra Christian University Foundation (YPTK Petra) was accepted on 22 October 1964, and was legally established on 7 January 1965.

Currently PCU has around 10,000 students who come from various regions in Indonesia and abroad. PCU's seven faculties offer undergraduate (S1-bachelor) and postgraduate (S2-magister and S3-doctoral) programs. In addition to academic education programs, Petra Christian University also organizes several professional programs that provide practical knowledge and skills for professionals and high school students.

== Faculties and departments ==
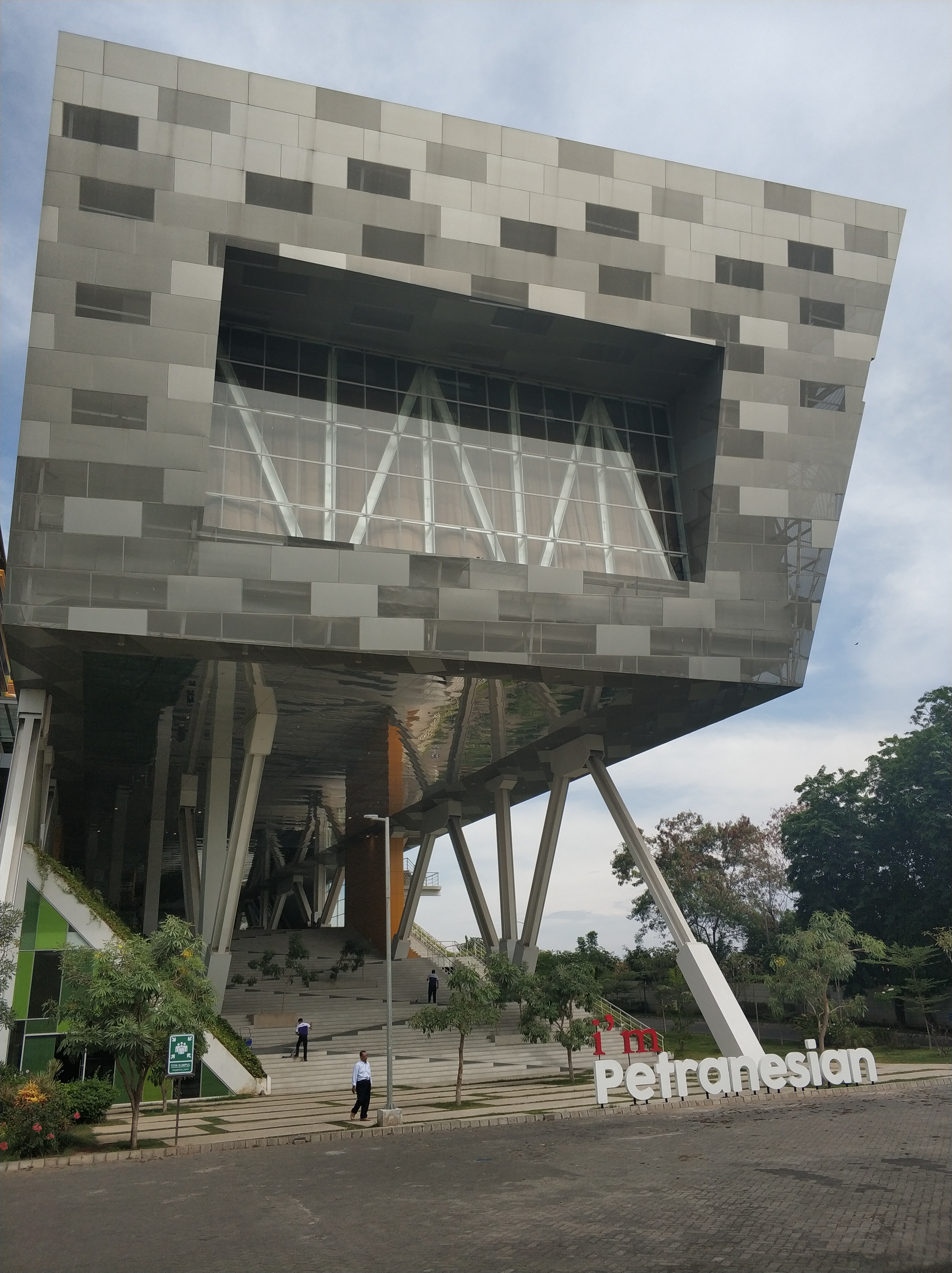
The faculty of Humanities and Creative Industry Building in Block Q.

The academic faculties and their respective departments at Petra Christian University are:

- Faculty of Civil Engineering and Planning
  - Civil Engineering
  - Architecture
- Faculty of Industrial Technology
  - Electrical Engineering
  - Mechanical Engineering
  - Automotive Engineering
  - Industrial Engineering
  - Information Engineering
  - Business Information Systems
  - International Business Engineering
- School of Business and Management
  - Business Accounting
  - Tax Accounting
  - Business Management
  - Marketing Management
  - Financial Management
  - Tourism Management
  - Hotel Management
  - International Business Management
  - International Business Accounting
- Faculty of Humanities and Creative Industry
  - English for Business
  - English for Creative Industry
  - Chinese Literature
  - Interior Design & Furniture
  - Fashion Design & Textile
  - Visual Communication Design
  - International Program in Digital Media
  - Strategic Communication Studies
  - Broadcast & Journalism Studies
- Faculty of Education
  - Childhood Education Studies
  - Primary Education Studies

== Campus ==
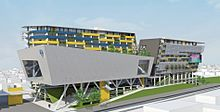
New Green Building Complex Block-Q completed in 2017, house of the Faculty of Humaniora and Creative Industry

The entire teaching and learning process and activities of organizing higher education are held in an area of 401,782 m² (0.401 km²), located on St. Siwalankerto 103-105, 121-131, and 142-144 plot situated in Surabaya - East Java, which is easily accessible by various mass transportation and highways. Located near with Suroboyo Night Carnival, Trans Studio Surabaya, Surabaya Zoo, City of Tomorrow Mall, Royal Plaza and Transmart Surabaya.

In its development in 2013, Petra Christian University began building a new building which is the first environmentally friendly university building in Surabaya, where Block-Q building was completed in 2017. The Campus has 31 Complex of buildings, that having an alphabetical naming. Security is provided by a team of in-house security officers and outsourced security guards. The university also has over 400 CCTV cameras throughout the campus.

== Student life ==
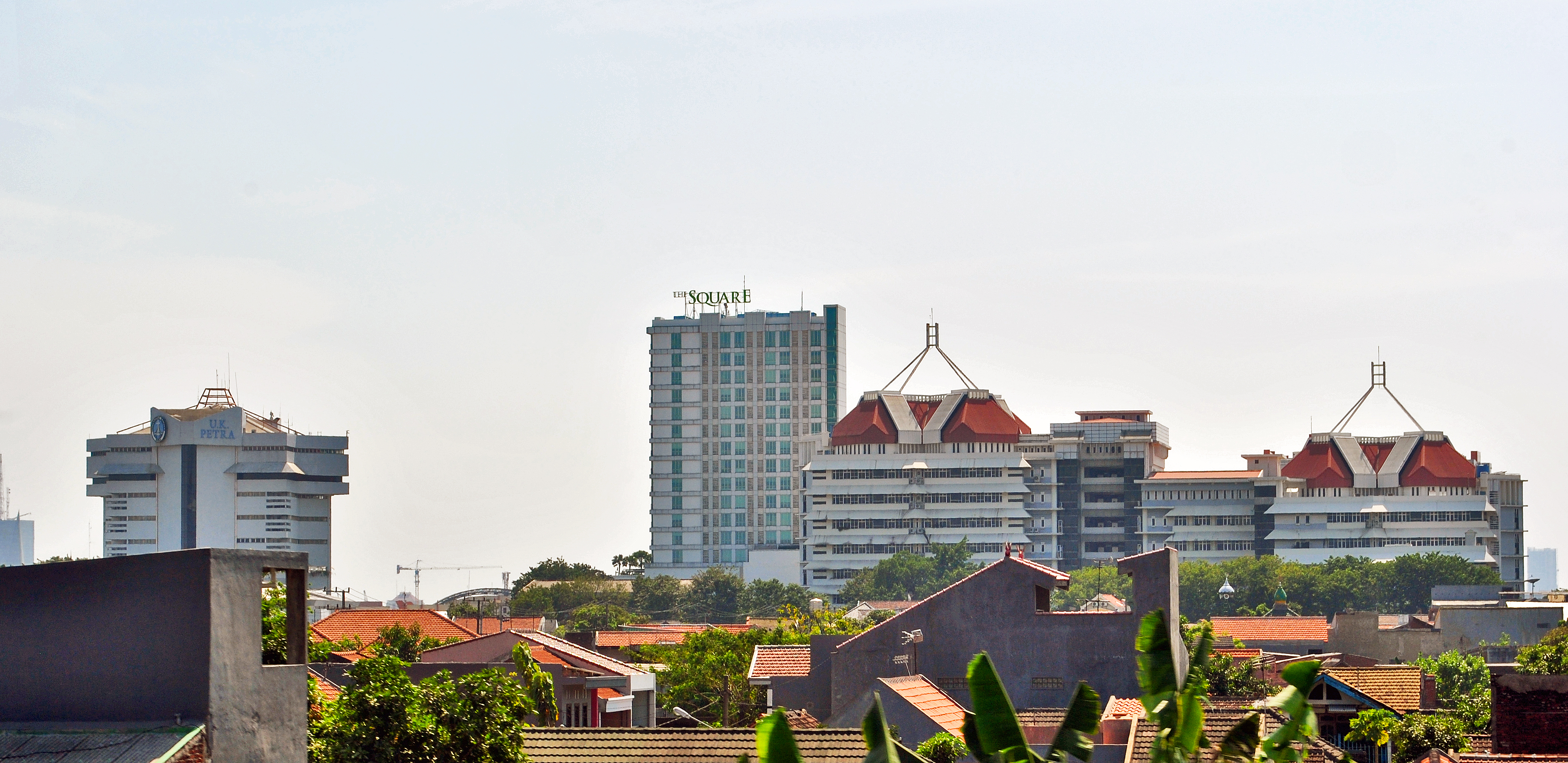
The panoramic view of Petra Christian University complex in 2015.

=== PCU Philharmonic Hall ===
Petra Christian University Philharmonic Hall was completed in 2017 with the capacity over 3,000 seats. It is the first concert hall built specifically for classical music and movie theater hall. It is the home of the Petra Little Theater and Petra Philharmonic Orchestra (PPO). The hall is constructed with concealed movable ceiling panels which can be adjusted to alter the volume in the hall and simulate a wide range of acoustic environments. Along with the Hall, there is also gymnastics studio, coffeehouse, reflecting pool, exhibition hall, stationery shop, retail store, ATM center, bank, auditorium, contemporary artpieces gallery and infinity gardenia.

=== Student media ===
DESA INFORMASI TELEVISION (DIVO) is the official student media in the PCU campus. It is an online augmented reality media platform founded and maintained by the students of the Faculty of Arts and Design and Faculty of Communication. The online information board is open to the existing student population and provides coverage of both on and off campus events. Various DIVO screens are spread at strategic points within the PCU campus area.

=== Library and publication media ===
The Petra Christian University Library provides various types of services supported by information technology, such as reference and information services, collection lending services, magazine and journal services, audiovisual services, information retrieval, database services, membership to outside communities, etc.

In addition to print collections, this library also owns and continues to develop digital collections such as Digital Theses, an online database of student final theses, e-Dimensions (Dimension journal articles), Surabaya Memory (documentation on the development of the city of Surabaya), Petra @rt Gallery (artwork of Petra Christian University campus community by the Faculty of Arts and Design), Petra iPoster (poster of activities or events on Petra Christian University campus), Petra Chronicle (historical documents and developments at Petra Christian University). In this library there is also a collection of audiovisual media and ProQuest online journal databases.

=== Campus Green Field Zone ===
Campus Green field Zone ("Lapangan Hijau") is a 985-square-metre (10,600 sq ft) campus epicentre, use for a students gathering and hold special events such as celebrating "Merdeka Days". This area is located in the centre of Block-W building (Main campus building). Along with the open green field, there is also academic library, coffeehouse, student center, stationery shop, retail store, ATM center, bank, auditorium and kolam jodoh reflecting pool.

=== Community Outreach Program ===
Community Outreach Program (COP) is a form of student academic activities that combines the form of education and teaching, research, and community service at the same time in one activity. As an educational and teaching activity, related to research, COP participant must observe, analyze, draw a conclusions from data and information about the problems and needs of the target community. As a community service activity, COP participant students can practice technology, science and art which they have mastered scientifically and institutionalized. In the context of internationalization, COP is a forum for service, learning multicultural interaction, science, technology and art of students between various countries.

=== Mobility program ===
PCU students may take part in exchange and dual-degree mobility programs in association with the Association of Christian Universities and Colleges in Asia (ACUCA), in which students may also be exchanged with universities partners to universities abroad from Australia, Japan, South Korea, Canada, United States, Netherlands, Germany, Switzerland, United Kingdom, Malaysia, Singapore, China, Hong Kong, Taiwan and many other countries. Students from partner institutions may also participate in exchanges to PCU.

== Transportation ==
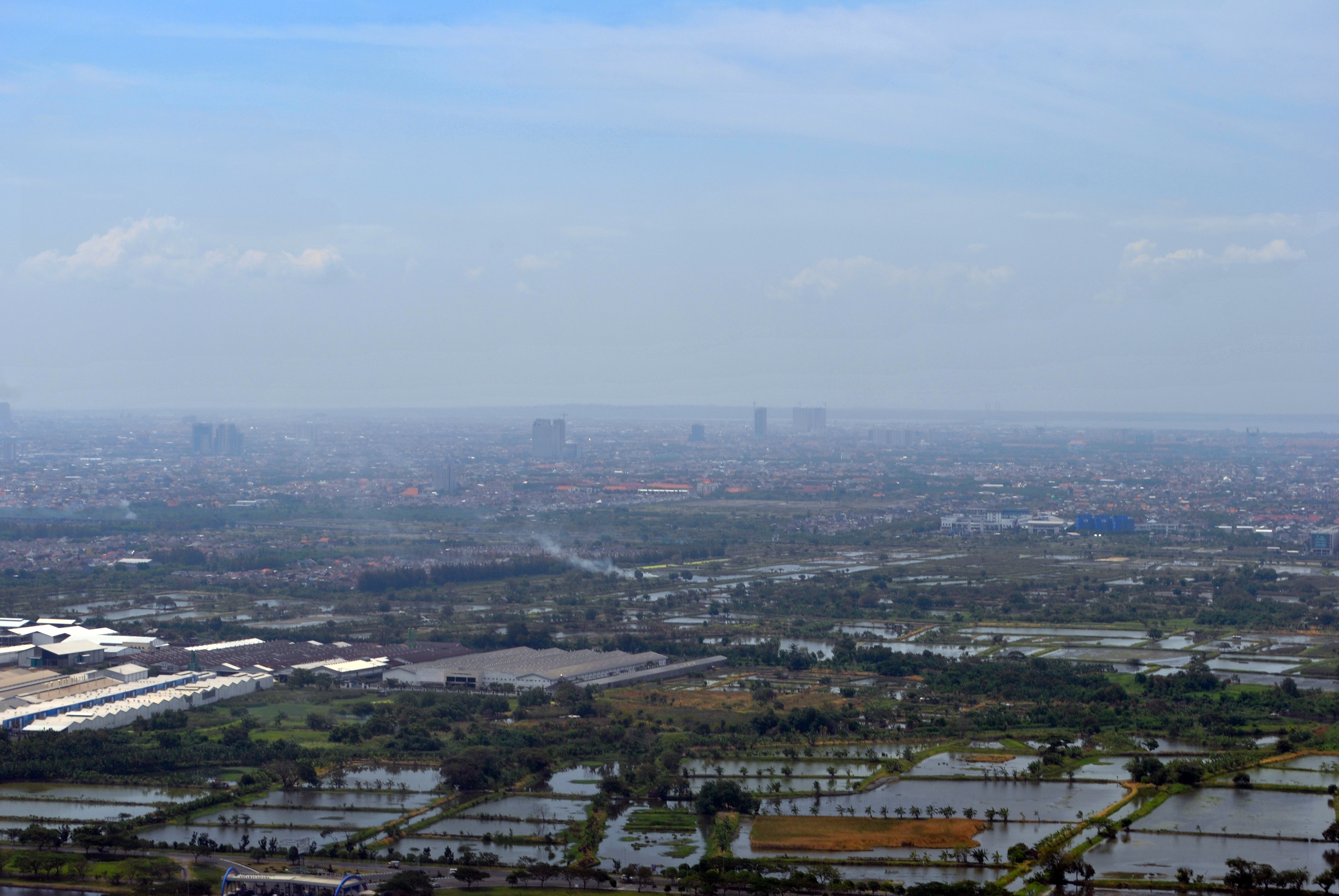
Grassland view near PCU Anta Parking lot

The university provides a free university shuttle commuting between the campus and car parking lot at Anta Park, which is approximately 0.2 km from campus. Shuttle services are offered for free to students and staff of the university.

== Supporting churches ==
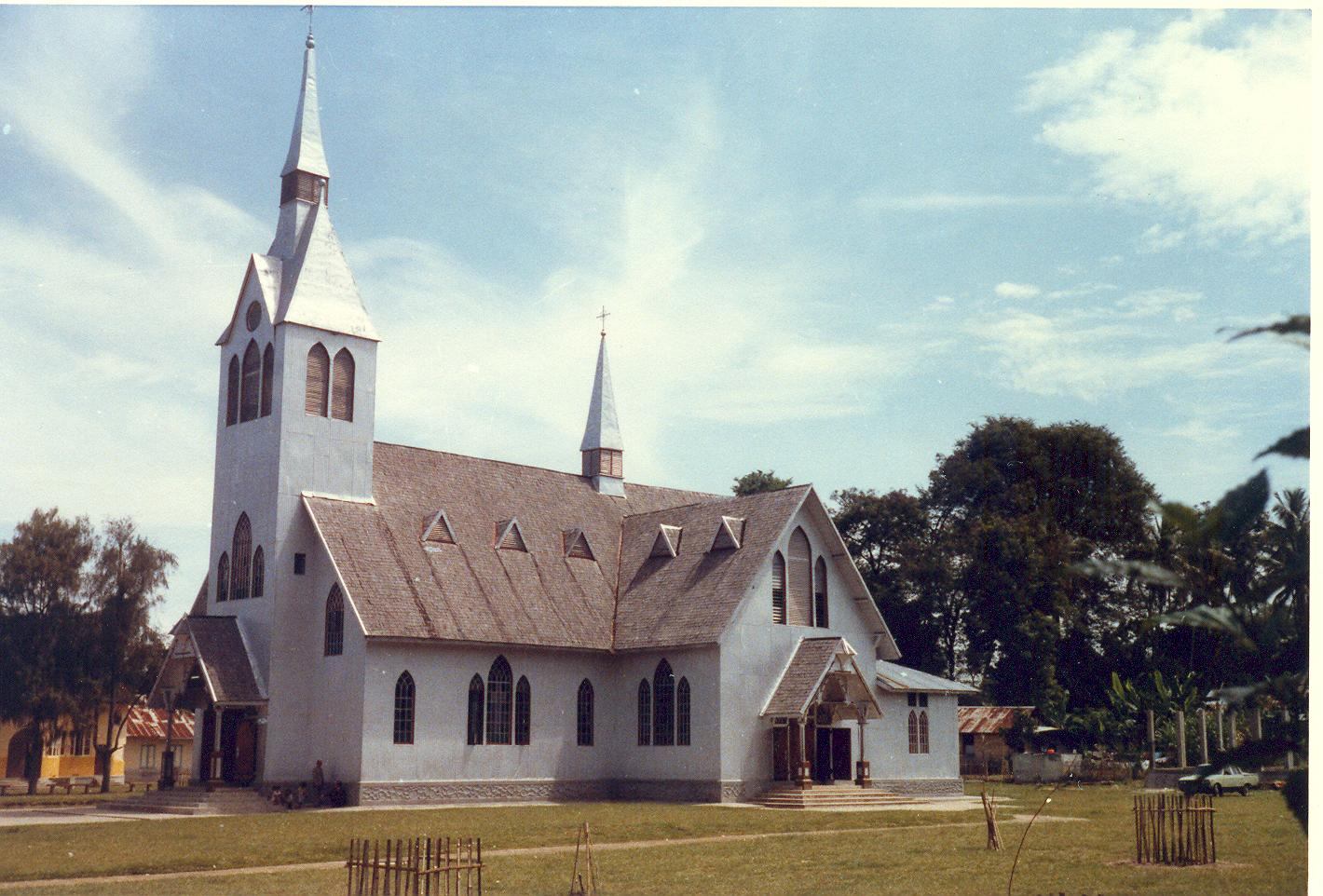
Batak Protestant Christian Church in 1971

The members of Petra Christian University Foundation is composed of representatives from PPPK Petra, representatives from supporting churches, and influential Christian figures.

Since 1965, PPPK Petra has had the support of seven church denominations in Surabaya, East Java, several churches with the background of christian, christian protestant, Orthodox and catholic church:

- Gereja Bethel Injil Sepenuh
- GKI Pregolan Bunder
- Gereja Kristen Indonesia (GKI)
- Gereja Kristen Jawi Wetan (GKJW)
- Gereja Pantekosta Pusat Surabaya
- Gereja Protestan di Indonesia bagian Barat (GPIB)
- Huria Kristen Batak Protestan (HKBP)

In 1987, the Reformed Church of Surabaya was renamed Gereja Kristen Indonesia Pregolan Bunder Surabaya and became a full Constituent Church of Gereja Kristen Indonesia; since then, YPTK Petra has had the support of six church denominations in Surabaya.

== Notable alumni ==
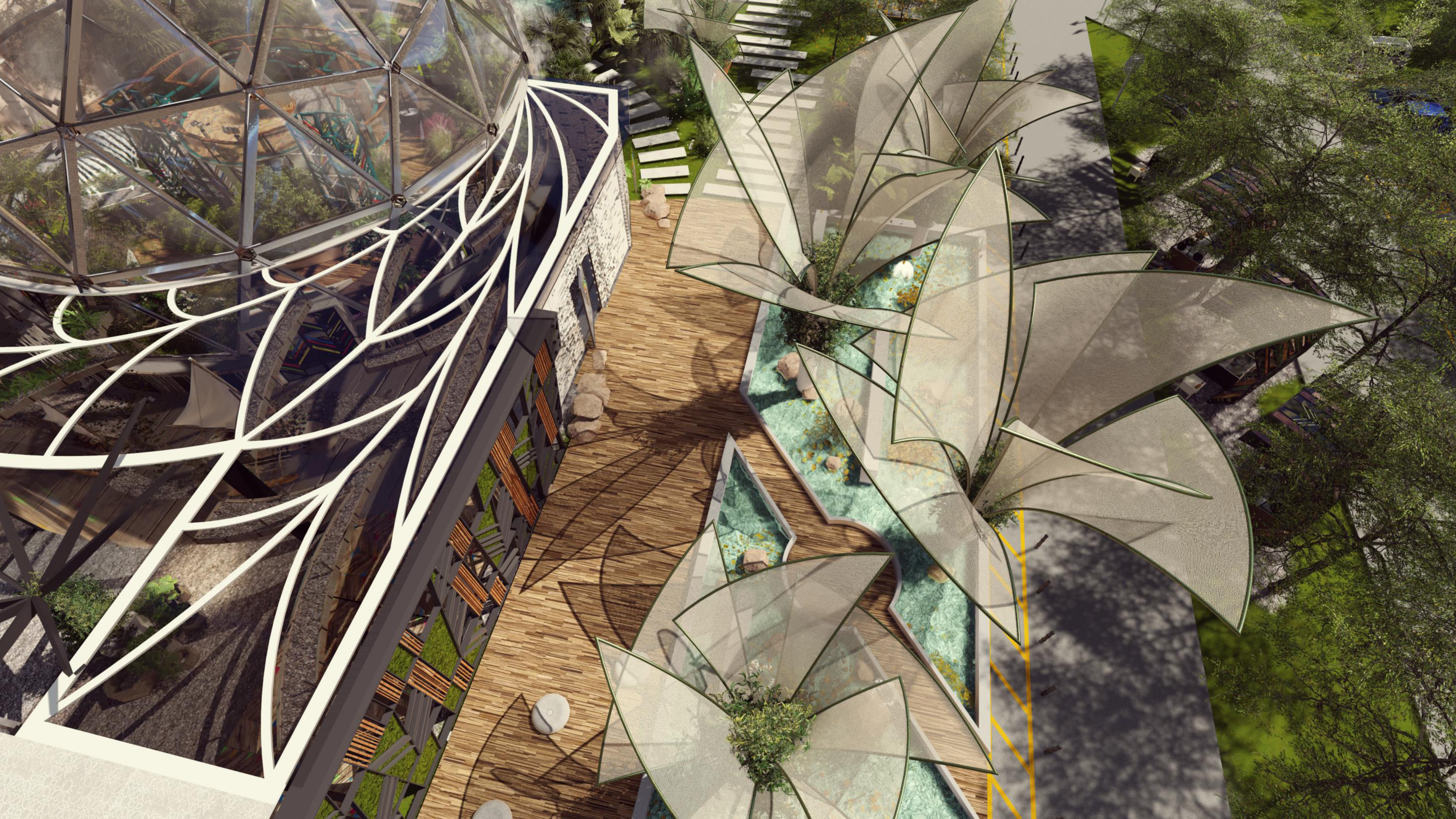
The panoramic view of Surabaya Mangrove Edu-Tourism Centre designed by Petra Christian University alumni David Ardi Laksono Lim in 2018.

- David Ardi Laksono Lim - Indonesian-Lebanese model, short filmmaker, screenwriter, interior-architectural designer, designer of Surabaya Mangrove Edu-Tourism Centre.
- Yotari Kezia - Indonesian Musical artist.
- Fandy Santoso - Indonesian Singer.
- Olivia Tommy Putri - Indonesian chef, Top 9 MasterChef Indonesia Season 8.
- Rebecca Natalia Suwignyo - Indonesian patisserie chef, Top 7 MasterChef Indonesia Season 7.
- Is Yunarto - Indonesian comic artist.
- Sandra Olga - Indonesian film actress, model and TV presenter.
- Paula Andrea - Indonesian INTM model.
- Stefani Hidajat - Indonesian-German novelist, short story and news column writer.
- Treesye Ratri Astuti - Indonesian architect, beauty pageant titleholder, Puteri Indonesia Lingkungan 1976 and Top 15 Miss International 1976.
- Welin Kusuma - Indonesian academism and lecture.
- Sherly Tjoanda - Indonesian politician and businesswoman who has served as the Governor of North Maluku.

== Partner institutions ==
PCU has signed MoU and/or AOI collaborates on academic cooperation with several overseas universities, such as:

- Malaysia
  - Universiti Tunku Abdul Rahman
  - Universiti Putra Malaysia
  - Universiti Malaysia Perlis (UniMAP)
- Singapore
  - National University of Singapore
  - Nanyang Academy of Fine Arts
  - Singapore Institute of Management
  - LASALLE College of Arts
- South Korea
  - Dongseo University
  - Dankook University
  - Soongsil University
  - Keimyung University
  - Sogang University
  - Woosong University
  - Handong Global University
  - SolBridge International School of Business
- Japan
  - Sophia University
  - Meiji University
  - Josai International University
  - Waseda University (Sōdai)
  - International Christian University
  - St. Andrew's University Japan (Momoyama Gakuin University)
- Australia
  - Macquarie University
  - University of New South Wales
  - University of Newcastle
  - Curtin University
  - Southern Cross University
  - University of Queensland
  - RMIT University
  - Monash University
- New Zealand
  - University of Auckland
  - The University of Waikato
- Canada
  - University of Regina
  - Carleton University
  - University of Windsor
- United States
  - TAFE, University of California Berkeley
  - University of California Los Angeles
  - University of Pennsylvania
  - Illinois Institute of Technology
  - Iowa State University
- Netherlands
  - Fontys University of Applied Sciences
  - Inholland University of Applied Sciences
  - Saxion University of Applied Sciences
  - Hogeschool van Utrecht University of Applied Sciences
  - Hanze University of Applied Sciences
- United Kingdom
  - University of Leeds
  - The University of Nottingham
  - Oxford Brookes University
  - Coventry University
- (Republic of Ireland) Ireland
  - Athlone Institute of Technology
- Spain
  - Universidad Católica San Antonio de Murcia
- France
  - TELECOM Lille 1
  - Université Sorbonne Paris Nord
- Germany
  - Dortmund University of Applied Sciences and Arts
  - Regensburg University of Applied Sciences
  - RheinMain University of Applied Sciences
  - West Coast University of Applied Sciences
- Switzerland
  - IMI International Management Institute Switzerland
- Hungary
  - Budapest University of Technology and Economics
- Russia
  - Southern Federal University
  - Far Eastern Federal University
  - Tomsk State University
- Lithuania
  - Vilnius University
  - Mykolas Romeris University
- China
  - Guangzhou University
  - Guangxi University
  - Guangxi University of Science and Technology
  - Hebei Normal University
  - Huaqiao University
  - Shanghai Normal University
  - Tianjin University
  - Yangzhou University
  - Beijing University of Posts and Telecommunications
  - Wenzao Ursuline University of Languages
- Hong Kong
  - Hong Kong Polytechnic University
  - Hong Kong Baptist University
  - Chinese University of Hong Kong
- Taiwan
  - Chung Yuan Christian University
  - Soochow University
  - Takming University of Science and Technology
  - National Taiwan University of Science and Technology
- Mongolia
  - Huree University of Information and Communication Technology
- Thailand
  - Bangkok University
  - Rajamangala University of Technology
  - Thaksin University
  - Suratthani Rajabhat University
  - Asian Institute of Technology
- Cambodia
  - Norton University
  - Cambodia University of Specialties
- Vietnam
  - Ho Chi Minh City University of Transport
- Philippines
  - De La Salle University
  - Bicol University
- Bangladesh
  - Daffodil International University

== See also ==
- Association of Christian Universities and Colleges in Asia (ACUCA)
