= Angkor University =

University in Siem Reap, Cambodia

- សាកលវិទ្យាល័យអង្គរ; Sakâlvĭtyéalai æŋkor
- Other names: A.U., ស.អ., SA-OR
- Motto: Quality Knowledge and Morality
- Type: Higher education and Research Institution
- Established: July 23, 2004; 21 years ago
- Chairman: H.E. Nek Oknha Seang Nam (Founder)
- Rector: Mr.HOUT Kongyou
- Academic staff: 237 (2022)
- Administrative staff: 76 (2022)
- Location: Krung Siem Reap, Siem Reap Province, Cambodia; 13.3507°N 103.8920°E
- Campus: Borey Seang Nam
- Language: Khmer and partly English
- Colors: Green, blue, white and Sky Blue
- Website: www.angkor.edu.kh

Angkor University (សាកលវិទ្យាល័យអង្គរ) is a higher education and research institution in Siem Reap Province, Cambodia.

The university is composed of seven academic faculties and three centers. According to a number of surveys, it is consistently ranked within the top 30 universities in Cambodia and is considered to be the best university in the Siem Reap province by the UniRank ranking. A.U. is best known for nursing, midwifery, engineering, architecture, computer science, interior design, Rural development, and Hotel Management and Tourism.

== Introduction ==
As a higher education and research institution that complies with international standards. A.U. was founded by local investors (H.E. Nek Oknha Seang Nam and Mr. Sok Tonh and received a strong support from the Japanese partners.

A.U. is one of a few universities in Cambodia under Ministry of Education, Youth and Sport and Ministry of Health with the aim that A.U. will be a university which can meet strict international standards. The university applies new teaching methods, which are based on student self-sufficiency, initiative, teamwork, leadership, community base, practical experiments and internship in local and international industry/organizations' partners.

A.U. offers undergraduate and postgraduate programs: Associate, Bachelor and Master. A.U. is one of the first universities in Siem Reap to fully follow the ACC's standards for Diploma (2-3/4-5/6-7); the model is widely used in most of the universities in Cambodia, especially in the health section. The Associate's programs last for two years for other disciplines, except for the associate degree in nursing (ADN), and Midwifery (ADM) last for three years; Bachelor's programs last for 4–5 years, except for the Bachelor of Science in nursing (BSN) lasts for two years which is an upgrading training program from AND to BSN; and Master's program is for two years. All courses are conducted in Khmer and English languages (slides and sources). The quality of training programs has been accredited by the ACC (Accreditation Committee of Cambodia) in 2021.

A.U. students from all disciplines can have the opportunity to participate and share their own ideas and theories in local and international communities and industries/organizations which have advanced sciences and technologies from the countries such as France, Netherlands, Belgium, Russia, Poland, Bulgaria, Japan, South Korea, China, Taiwan, Thailand, Philippines, and Indonesia, etc.

== Location ==
Nowadays, A.U. is located at Borey Seang Nam, Phum Khnar, Sangkat Chreav, Krong Siem Reap, Siem Reap Province, Kingdom of Cambodia.

Angkor University

== History ==
Only during the 9th to 12th centuries of the Angkor era, there were three established universities included Ta Prohm University (taught literature, arts, philosophy and religion), Preah Khan University (taught management and general knowledge) and Neak Poan University (taught medical treatments) in Siem Reap (until 16th century, known as Yasodharapura). Before the year of 2002, there were few high schools and technical centers in Krong Siem Reap. Only foreign languages and basic pedagogy were taught. The initiative for the establishment of the university, is attributed to H.E. Nek Oknha Seang Nam, to support the national Vision on One Province, One University, proposed by Samdech Akka Moha Sena Padei Techo Hun Sen in 2002. Angkor University (A.U.) has been officially recognized by Sub-Decree No. 28 ANKr.BK, dated 23 July 2004, of Royal Government of Cambodia. A.U. was originally composed of five faculties: Business Administration and Tourism, Science and Technology, Humanities and Foreign Languages, Sociology and Law, and Agriculture.

== Academics and governance ==
=== Academics ===
Angkor University is organized into seven faculties and three centers.

Faculties

- Business Administration and Tourism (2004)
- Science and Technology (2004)
- Humanities and Foreign Languages (2004)
- Sociology and Law (2004)
- Agriculture (2004)
- Public Health (2009)
- Engineering and Architecture (2018)

Scientific Centers

- Center of Foreign Languages (2015)
- SMARTECH Center (2019)

Research and Innovation

- Research Center for Excellence and Innovation (2020)

=== Permanent member of Board of Trustees and Rector ===
==== Chairman ====
The chairman, H.E. Nek Oknha Seang Nam, is chair of Board of Trustees (the university council) and provides advice to the Rector, as well as having ceremonial duties.

==== Vice-chairman ====
The vice-chairman, Mr. Sok Tonh, is deputy chair of Board of Trustees (the university council) and secretary for H.E. Nek Oknha Seang Nam, and also provides advice engaged in the sponsorship or financial segment to the Rector, as well as having ceremonial duties.

==== Rector ====
The Permanent member of the Board of Trustees is the chief of executive committee of the university, who is head of A.U.'s day-to-day activities. The Permanent member of Board of Trustees is also the Rector of Angkor university. This position is equivalent role to the president or principal of other educational institutions in some ASEAN countries or North America. The current Permanent member of Board of Trustees and Rector is Gnel Rattha, Ph.D. He was named as Permanent member of Board of Trustees and Rector on 8 August 2019.

== Education scholarships ==
There are four major types of Scholarship available:

- A.U. Scholarship Exam (Students are awarded 50% and 100% scholarships depending on their exam scores) for nursing, midwifery, Engineering, Architecture, Public Law, Hotel and Tourism Management, Accounting, Computer Science, Information Technology, English Language, and Rural Development
- H.E. Seang Nam (100% tuition fee) for Engineering and Architecture
- Genkiya Fund (100% scholarships, stipend and Dormitory) for Associate in Nursing
- A.U. Family Scholarship
