= 2023 Mount Bromo fire =

2023 human-caused wildfire in East Java, Indonesia

On the evening of 6 September 2023, a fire broke out at Teletubbies Hill in Mount Bromo, East Java.

== Timeline ==
On September 6, 2023, a couple was conducting a pre-wedding photoshoot at Teletubbies Hill in Mount Bromo. During the photoshoot, they used five flares as instructed by the wedding organizer team. Unfortunately, one of the flares exploded, sparking a fire that quickly spread and led to a large blaze in the Bromo savannah. The incident was reported to the Bromo tourism manager at approximately 11:30 AM (WIB UTC+07:00).

The Bromo tourism manager subsequently notified the Sukapura Police in Probolinggo. When the officers arrived at the scene, the Mount Bromo savannah had already been burned, and they proceeded to arrest the couple and four other individuals who were with them.

One of the tourists shared a video of the incident on social media, which has been viewed 480,000 times as of September 7, 2023. The fire continued to spread in the savannah area during the night. As a result, Mount Bromo tourism was temporarily closed, and officers began the process of extinguishing the fire.

On September 8, 2023, Head of East Java BPBD Emergency Section Satriyo Nurseho said the area of land affected by the Mount Bromo fire, which had not yet been extinguished, had reached 274 hectares. The officers were then divided into two teams, with the upper team extinguishing the fire at the top of Mount Kursi and the lower team extinguishing the fire on the slopes of Mount Kursi so it did not spread to the savannah. The fire on the east side was then successfully extinguished and the team later focused on extinguishing the fire on the west side. The joint team of 50 people extinguished the fire using gepyoks and a tanker. There were three remaining fire points with light smoke conditions.

On September 10, 2023, there was a fire tornado phenomenon during the fire. The occurrence of tornadoes is a common event in the Mount Bromo area, but this occurred simultaneously with forest and land fires. The incident lasted about three to five minutes and damaged the surrounding vegetation.

However, on September 14, 2023, the chief executive of the East Java BPBD, Gatot Soebroto, stated that the fire had been successfully extinguished on Thursday, the process of extinguishing the fire was aided by the rain that had fallen since Wednesday, September 13.

== Arrest ==
Police arrested six people who were involved in the pre-wedding photo shoot activities and named the 41-year-old photographer, Andrie Wibowo Eka Wardhana, as the suspect. Andrie is a wedding organizer manager from Lumajang Regency and was a graduate of Petra Christian University. He was married to Ferida on September 29, 2012. The couple later moved to Surabaya and managed a photography and videography business specifically for weddings called AW Pictures.

== Aftermath ==
The pre-wedding couple who caused the fire expressed an open apology to the Tenggerese people at the Ngadisari Village Hall, Probolinggo. The groom, Hendra, who was accompanied by his attorney, also stated that he did not intend to damage the Mount Bromo conservation area and apologized for his negligence.
