= Stefani Hid =

Indonesian writer (born 1985)

- Born: August 12, 1985 (age 41); Surabaya, Indonesia
- Education: Petra Christian University; Westfalische Wilhelms Universitat Munster
- Occupations: Author, columnist, cartoonist

Stefani Hidajat (born August 12, 1985 in Surabaya, East Java) is an Indonesian writer. She grew up in Surabaya and Jakarta, Indonesia. Stefani Hid attended Petra Christian University majoring in English Literature. She completed her master's degree at University of Münster and currently resides in Munich, Germany Stefani has been absent from her home country Indonesia and living in Germany for more than 10 years.

== Literary work ==
Stefani Hid has written novels, short-stories, and columns. Her first novel Bukan Saya, Tapi Mereka Yang Gila (It’s Not Me, but It’s Them Who’re Crazy!) was published by Kata Kita publishing in 2004. After the publication of her first novel, she has been written some short stories which has been published in newspapers, magazines and journals: Jurnal Prosa, Koran Tempo, Suara Merdeka, Media Indonesia, Spice! and Matra. Her second novel, Soulmate: Belahan Jiwa (Soulmate), was published in the same year by Kata Kita publishing, followed by her third novel, Cerita Dante (Dante's Story), which was published in 2006 by Grasindo publishing. In 2008, Grasindo publishing published her short stories collection entitled Oz (Oz).

Stefani Hid's novels and short stories deal with the theme of existentialism, fatalism and absurdity.

Stefani Hid also wrote for a column about men and sex called "Opposite" in Indonesia men's magazine Matra.

Her short story "Penghuni Kepalaku" ("The Inhabitant of my Head") has been translated into German with the title "Mein Kopfbewohner", together with some Indonesian writers in Duft der Asche: Literarische Stimmen indonesischer Frauen and has been presented by Nicola Toelke in Hubi, Ochtrup, Germany. Some parts of her first novel Bukan Saya, Tapi Mereka Yang Gila (It’s Not Me, but It’s Them Who’re Crazy!) have been translated into English together with other writers in Menagerie 7: People like Us

In 2012, Gramedia Pustaka Utama published her novel Katzenjammer: Cerita Tentang Henning dan Aya (Katzenjammer: A Story about Henning and Aya).

In 2021, Stefani Hid, this time under her real full name Stefani Hidajat, published a collection of her cartoons in English called Mama Poochie, followed by the second volume Mama Poochie: Übermom and Divine Comedy in 2025.
