= Duta Wacana Christian University =

Private university in Yogyakarta, Indonesia

- Universitas Kristen Duta Wacana
- Motto: 'The New Breed of Professional'
- Type: Private
- Established: 31 October 1962
- Affiliations: SAP University Partnership Program, Oracle Academic Initiative (OAI), Oracle Workforce Development Program, MSDN Academic Alliance, Cisco Networking Academy, Association of Christian Universities and Colleges in Asia (ACUCA)
- Rector: Dr.-Ing. Wiyatiningsih, S.T., M.T.
- Faculty: 6 (Theology, Business, Architecture and Design, Information Technology, Biotechnology, Medicine) and 13 departments
- Administrative staff: 182 person (Bachelor: 58, Master: 107, Doctor: 11, Professor: 6)
- Location: Jl. Dr. Wahidin Sudirohusodo 5 - 25 Yogyakarta 55224 Indonesia, Yogyakarta, Special Region of Yogyakarta, Indonesia; 7°47′09″S 110°22′41″E
- Campus: Klitren/Dr. Wahidin/City (48.550 m2)
- Language: Indonesian
- Colors: Gray Green Green
- Website: www.ukdw.ac.id www2.ukdw.ac.id id:Universitas Kristen Duta Wacana

- Location in Yogyakarta Location in Java Location in Indonesia

Duta Wacana Christian University (Indonesian: Universitas Kristen Duta Wacana) (Hanacaraka: ꦈꦤꦶꦮ꦳ꦼꦂꦱꦶꦠꦱ꧀ꦏꦿꦶꦱ꧀ꦠꦼꦤ꧀ꦢꦸꦠꦮꦕꦤ) abbreviated as DWCU, is a private university in Yogyakarta, central of Java Island, Indonesia. "Duta Wacana" in Sanskrit conveys an approximate meaning of being 'an ambassador for knowledge' or 'a messenger of the word'.

According to Webometrics World Universities' Ranking on the Web 2007, DWCU was ranked at 89th place among Southeast Asian universities.

DWCU is one of the 15 Indonesian universities in the SAP University Partnership Program.

== History ==
Main Building

A fusion of two theological academies – Jogjakarta Theological Academy, Yogyakarta and Balewijoto Theological School, Malang – on 31 October 1962, become the Duta Wacana Theological School. This school later became a university, with the name changed to the present Duta Wacana Christian University in 1985.

The Duta Wacana Christian University was established and run by the Foundation of Christian High Education of Duta Wacana.

== Accreditation ==
Accreditation = A
National Accreditation Board of Higher Education (BAN-PT) – Directory of Study Program. Queried with keyword "Duta Wacana", polished and translated.

No.	Region	Level	University Name	Study Program	No. SK	SK year	Rank	Score	Expired Date
1	05	S1	Duta Wacana Christian University, Yogyakarta	Theology	004	2015	A	375	2020
2	05	S1	Duta Wacana Christian University, Yogyakarta	Architecture	022	2005	A	373.66	2010-12-08
3	05	S1	Duta Wacana Christian University, Yogyakarta	Management	024	2005	A	369.71	2010-12-27
4	05	S1	Duta Wacana Christian University, Yogyakarta	Informatics	022	2005	B	333.89	2010-12-08
5	05	S1	Duta Wacana Christian University, Yogyakarta	Biology	004	2006	A	370.72	2011-06-01
6	05	S1	Duta Wacana Christian University, Yogyakarta	Accountancy	005	2006	B	350.47	2011-06-15

Library gate

== Gallery ==
Corridor

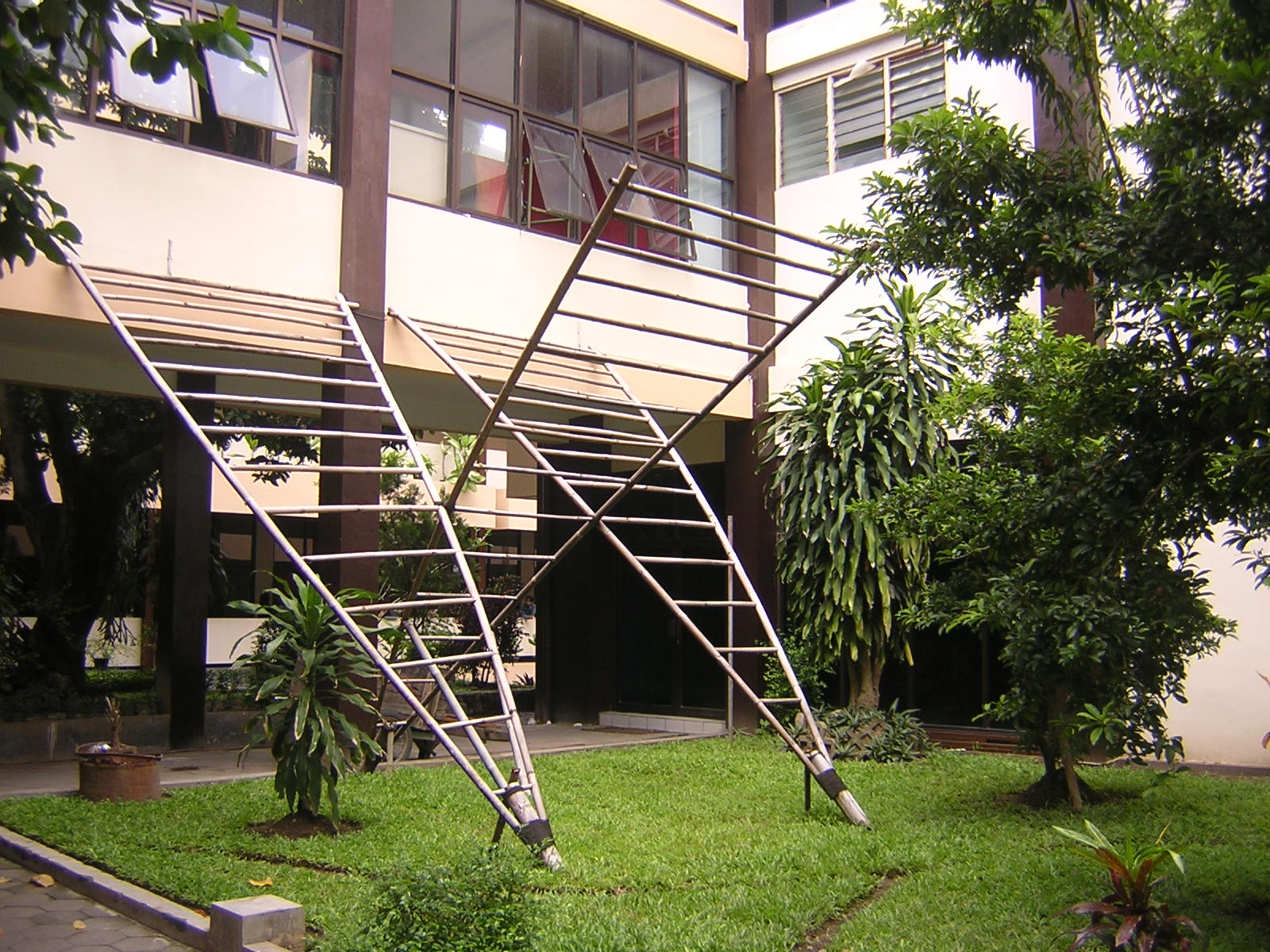
Bamboo art in atrium

Auditorium

Front side
