= IIC University of Technology =

University in Cambodia

- សាកលវិទ្យាល័យអាយអាយស៊ីនៃបច្ចេកវិទ្យា
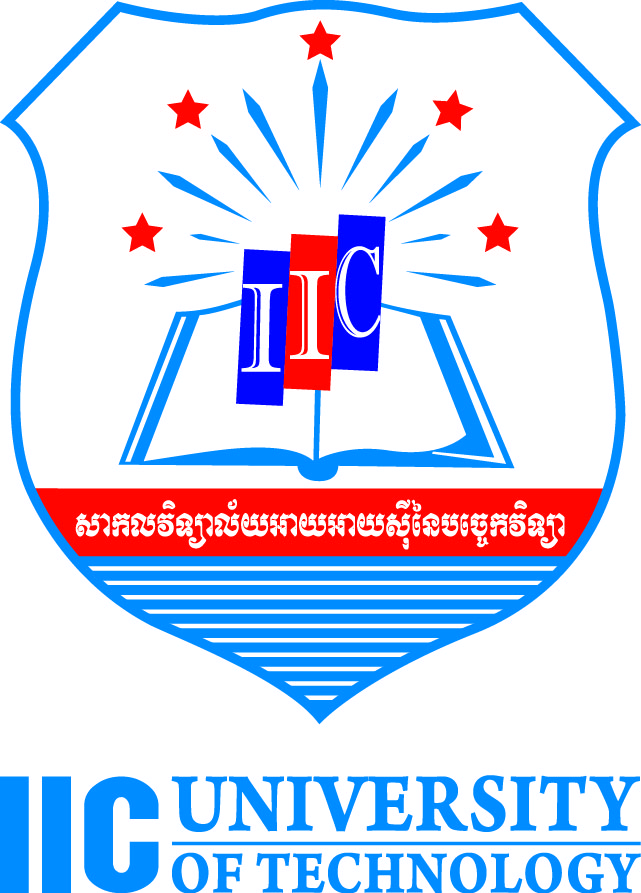
- Established: 2008; 18 years ago
- Rector: Prof. Dr. Chhuon Chanthan
- Location: Phnom Penh, Cambodia

IIC University of Technology (IIC) came into existence in 2008 through the evolution of the International Institute of Cambodia, founded in 1999. IIC University is accredited by the Royal Government of Cambodia as specified in Sub-Decree No. 127ANK.BK. It is a member of the International Association of Universities.

== Academics ==
=== Faculties ===
The university has five faculties.

- Faculty of Commerce
- Faculty of Economics
- Faculty of Mathematics and Science
- Faculty of Social Science
- Faculty of Arts, Humanities and Linguistics

=== Graduate school ===
The graduate school of IIC University of Technology consists of five faculties:

- Management & Business Administration
- Social Sciences and Communication
- Engineering
- Pure Science and Medicine
- Computer Science and Information Technology

As a result of the MBA program, consultants with a hands-on approach are produced.

The university offers conventional and industrial PhD programs. Industrial PhD is a qualification to train professionals to solve industry-oriented problems. Conventional PhD focuses on 80% academic needs and 20% industrial needs whereas Industrial PhD is 20% academic needs and 80% industrial needs. IIC thrives to a higher grade of internationalisation. Students from abroad apply for graduate school such as from Germany, India, USA, Sri Lanka, Switzerland or Austria.

== Accreditation and recognition ==
=== Domestic ===
- Ministry of Education, Youth and Sport (Cambodia)

=== International ===
- (France) International Association of Universities (IAU)

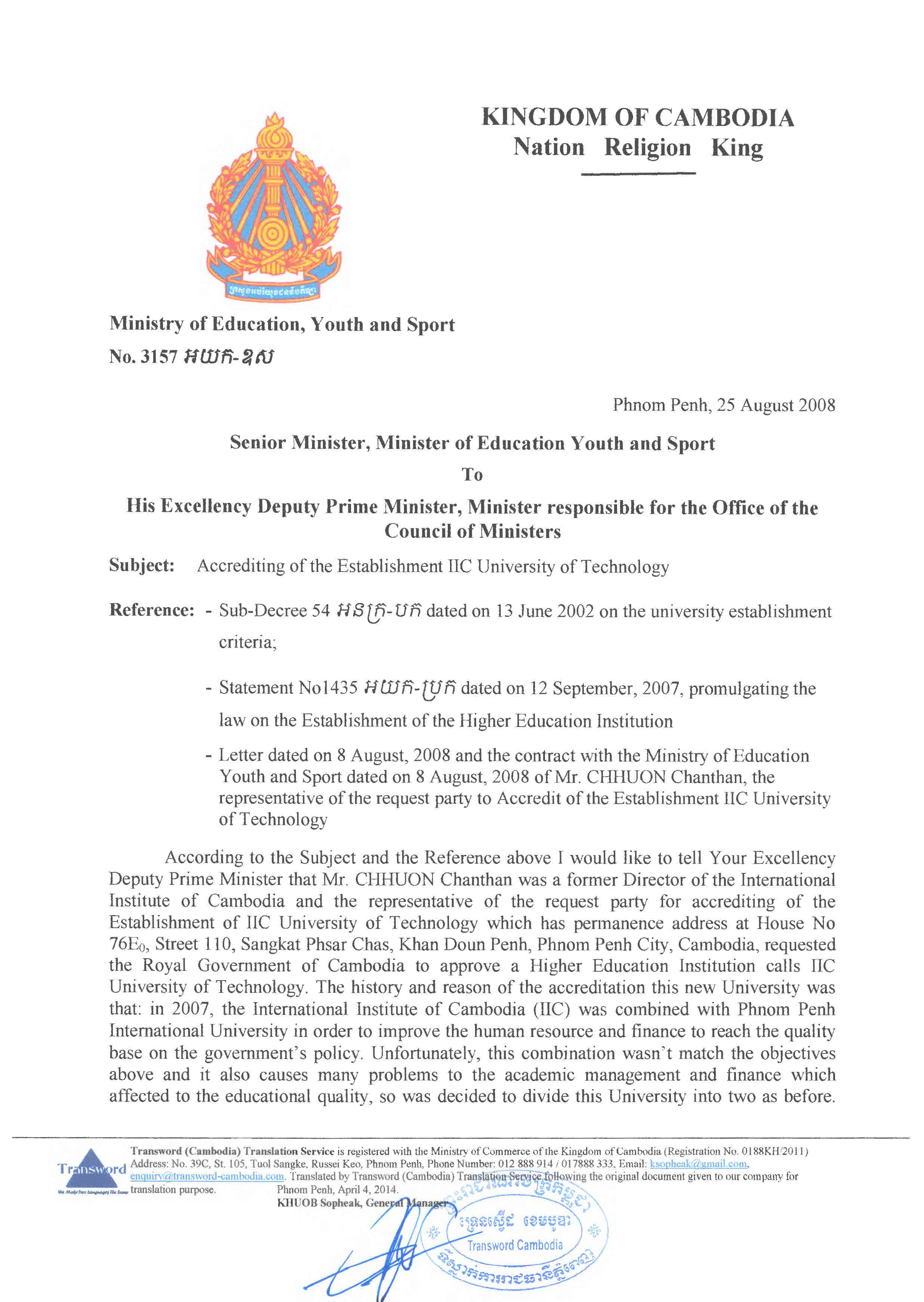
Accrediting Establishment of IIC University of Technology

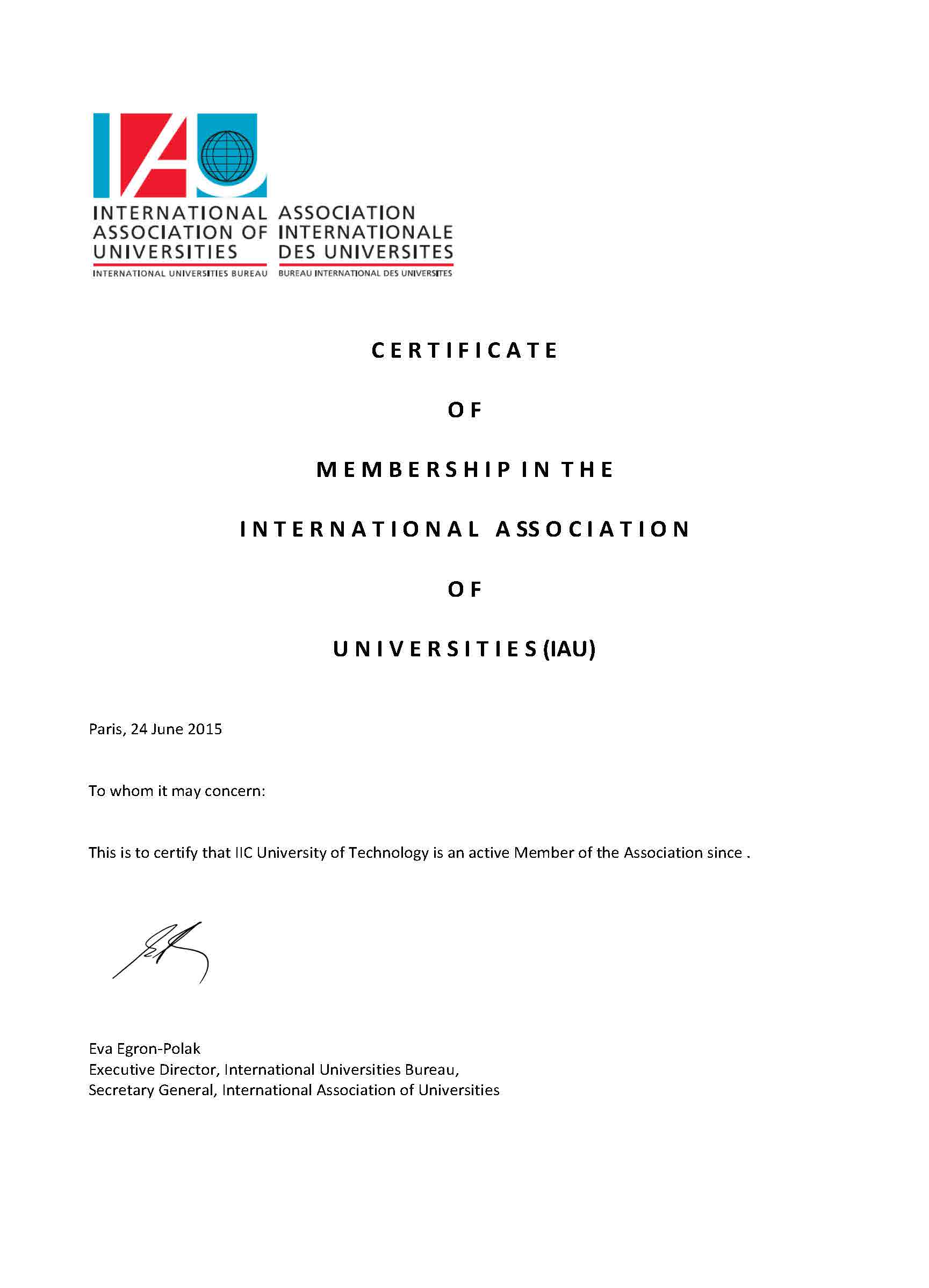
IAU Membership
