= Association of Christian Universities and Colleges in Asia =

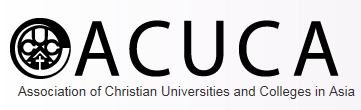

The Association of Christian Universities and Colleges in Asia (ACUCA) is an organization of Christian universities and colleges in Asia, dedicated to Christian witness and service in the field of education. It consists of 69 institutions: 3 in Hong Kong, 2 in India, 15 in Indonesia, 15 in Japan, 7 in Korea, 1 in Myanmar, 13 in the Philippines, 9 in Taiwan and 4 in Thailand.

== Membership ==
=== Hong Kong ===
- Chung Chi College, Chinese University of Hong Kong
- Hong Kong Baptist University
- Lingnan University

=== India ===
- Christ University
- Lady Doak College
- Women's Christian College

=== Indonesia ===
- Atma Jaya Catholic University of Indonesia
- Atma Jaya University, Yogyakarta
- Christian University of Indonesia
- Dhyana Pura University
- Duta Wacana Christian University
- Krida Wacana Christian University
- Maranatha Christian University
- Parahyangan Catholic University
- Pelita Harapan University
- Petra Christian University
- Sanata Dharma University
- Satya Wacana Christian University
- Soegijapranata Catholic University
- Tarakanita School of Communication and Secretarial Studies
- Widya Mandala Catholic University

=== Japan ===
- Aoyama Gakuin University
- Doshisha University
- Hiroshima Jogakuin University
- Hokusei Gakuen University
- International Christian University
- J. F. Oberlin University
- Kobe College
- Kwansei Gakuin University
- Meiji Gakuin University
- Momoyama Gakuin University
- Nanzan University
- Osaka Jogakuin University
- Seinan Gakuin University
- Sophia University
- Tokyo Woman's Christian University

=== South Korea ===
- Ewha Womans University
- Handong Global University
- Hannam University
- Keimyung University
- Sogang University
- Soongsil University
- Yonsei University

=== Myanmar ===
- Myanmar Institute of Theology

=== Philippines ===
- Assumption College San Lorenzo
- Ateneo de Manila University
- Central Philippine University
- De La Salle University
- De La Salle University Dasmariñas
- Filamer Christian University
- La Consolacion University Philippines
- Miriam College
- Philippine Christian University
- Silliman University
- St. Paul University Philippines
- Trinity University of Asia
- Wesleyan University Philippines

=== Taiwan ===
- Aletheia University
- Chang Jung Christian University
- Chung Yuan Christian University
- Fu Jen Catholic University
- Providence University
- Soochow University
- St. John's University
- Tunghai University
- Wenzao Ursuline College of Languages

=== Thailand ===
- Asia-Pacific International University
- Assumption University
- Christian University of Thailand
- Payap University
