= International University (Cambodia) =

Private institution

Coordinates: 11°34′33.98″N 104°53′49.15″E

- សាកលវិទ្យាល័យអន្តរជាតិ
- Motto: Excellence in Quality Education & Research
- Type: Private
- Established: September 2002; 23 years ago
- Affiliations: CHEA, ACC, AMEA, IIME, ECFMG, IMED, WHO, ASAIHL, FAIMER, ASEF, SEAADE
- President: H.E. Prof. UON Sabo
- Location: 35-41 St. 582, Sangkat Boengkak II, Khan Tuol Kouk, Phnom Penh, Cambodia
- Campus: 2 Urban
- Nickname: IU
- Website: www.iu.edu.kh

International University (IU; Khmer: សាកលវិទ្យាល័យអន្តរជាតិ) is a private higher education institution specializing in medicine and medical science. Established in 2002, IU is recognized and nationally accredited by the government of Cambodia, the Ministry of Education, Youth and Sports and the Accreditation Committee of Cambodia (ACC). International University education standards are recognized by transnational medical institutions such as the Asia–Europe Foundation, Association of Southeast Asian Institutions of Higher Learning (ASAIHL), UN World Health Organization – including accreditation with the United States–based Educational Commission for Foreign Medical Graduates (ECFMG), Foundation for Advancement of International Medical Education and Research (FAIMER) and International Medical Education Directory (IMED) enabling medical school graduates to take the three complete steps of the United States Medical Licensing Examination (USMLE) and on successful completion can register for physician residency and practice medicine in the United States. The medium of instruction used at IU are English and Khmer.

== Faculties ==
- Medicine and Pediatrics
- Nursing Sciences
- Dentistry
- Humanities and Languages
- Science and Technology
- Agriculture and Rural Development
- School of Public Health
- (Business and Economics)
- (Social Sciences and Journalism)
- (Law)

== Academic collaborations ==
IU main building

- Vinayaka Mission's Research Foundation, India
- National University of Laos
- National University of Malaysia
- Our Lady of Fatima University, Philippines
- Rizal Technological University, Philippines
- Otorhinolaryngology Research Center, Russia
- Peoples' Friendship University of Russia
- Research Institute of Pediatric Hematology of Russia
- Chulalongkorn University, Thailand
- Chiang Mai University, Thailand
- Khon Kaen University, Thailand
- Mahidol University, Thailand
- Rangsit University, Thailand

== Accreditation and recognition ==
=== Domestic ===
- Cambodian Higher Education Association (CHEA)
- Accreditation Committee of Cambodia (ACC)
- Royal Government of Cambodia

=== Foreign ===
- AVICENNA Directory for medicine, Denmark
- Asian Medical Education Association (AMEA), Hong Kong
- Asia–Europe Foundation (ASEF), Singapore
- Association of Southeast Asian Institutions of Higher Learning (ASAIHL), Thailand
- Institute for International Medical Education (IIME), United States
- International Medical Education Directory, United States

== See also ==
- List of medical schools
- List of pharmacy schools
- International medical graduate

== Notes ==
- "Lecture Tours" (Press release). Asia-Europe Foundation. 2006-05-09. Archived from the original on 2006-10-07.
- "World Health Organization Directory of Medical Schools" (PDF) (Press release). United Nations (WHO). 2009-05-05. Archived from the original (PDF) on 2009-04-20.
