= Paragon International University =

Private university in Phnom Penh, Cambodia

- សាកលវិទ្យាល័យអន្តរជាតិផារ៉ាហ្គន
- Former name: Zaman University
- Motto: "Leading Your Way"
- Type: Private
- Established: 18 May 2010; 16 years ago
- Chairman: H.E. Chea Sophakanny
- Rector: Assoc. Prof. Dr. Bulat Akhmetkarimov
- Location: 8 St. 315, Tuol Kouk District, Phnom Penh, Cambodia
- Campus: Urban
- Nickname: Paragon.U
- Website: paragoniu.edu.kh

Paragon International University (Khmer: សាកលវិទ្យាល័យអន្តរជាតិផារ៉ាហ្គន), formerly Zaman University (Khmer: សាកលវិទ្យាល័យហ្សាម៉ាន់) from 2010 to 2018, is a private university located in Phnom Penh, Cambodia. The university is accredited by the Royal Government of Cambodia and the Accreditation Committee of Cambodia (ACC). At Paragon International University, the programs are taught in English.

The university was founded in 2010 by Ali Kokten, the former chairman of Zaman International School. Paragon.U has eleven departments, divided into five faculties: Faculty of Engineering, Faculty of Information and Computer Technologies, Faculty of Economics and Administrative Sciences, Faculty of Arts, Humanities and Languages, and Faculty of Mathematics and Sciences. In 2019 Paragon.U opened the School of Graduate Studies, which offers fours master's programs: Master of Business Administration (MBA), Master of Arts in International Relations, Master of Science in Management of Information Systems, and Master of Science in Computer Science. Paragon International University also offers four doctoral programs: Ph.D. in Management of Information Systems, Ph.D. in Computer Science, Ph.D. in International Relations, and Doctor of Business Administration (D.B.A). All the undergraduate and graduate degrees are officially recognized by the Cambodian Ministry of Education, Youth and Sport (MoEYS).

== Faculties ==
There are five faculties divided into thirteen departments.

=== Faculty of Engineering ===
- Department of Architecture (ARC)
- Department of Civil Engineering (CE)
- Department of Industrial Engineering (IE)
- Engineering Lab

=== Faculty of Economics and Administrative Sciences ===
- Department of Economics (ECON)
- Department of Banking and Finance (BAF)
- Department of Business Administration (BUS)
- Department of International Trade and Logistics (ITL)
- Department of Political Science and International Relations (IR)

=== Faculty of Information and Computer Technologies ===
- Department of Management of Information Systems (MIS)
- Department of Computer Science (CS)
- Department of Digital Arts and Design (DAD)

=== Faculty of Arts, Humanities and Languages ===
- Writing Center
- English Language Instruction
- Foreign Languages
- Khmer Studies

=== Faculty of Mathematics and Sciences ===
- Mathematics Instruction
- Science Instruction

=== School of Graduate Studies ===
- Master of Arts in International Relations
- Master of Business Administration
- Master of Science in Management of Information Systems
- Master of Science in Computer Science
- Ph.D. in Management of Information Systems
- Ph.D. in Computer Science
- Ph.D. in International Relations
- Doctor of Business Administration (D.B.A.)

== History ==
In 2010, Zaman University was founded as a new member of Zaman educational institutions. The success of Zaman International Schools (Primary and High School) inspired the management board of Zaman Co. Ltd. to contribute further to Cambodia's higher education sector by establishing Zaman University.

On 28 January 2019, Zaman University was re-branded as Paragon International University which was approved by the Ministry of Education, Youth and Sport (Cambodia).

== Location ==
Paragon International University has two campuses: the "Main Campus", and the newly added Faculty of Economics and Administrative Sciences building "EAS campus" opened in November 2025. Both campuses are located on the same street, and only 600m apart in the capital city of Phnom Penh in Tuol Kork Area.

== See also ==
- List of universities in Cambodia
