= International Institute of Cambodia =

International Institute of Cambodia (IIC) was created in 1999. In 2007, IIC merged with the Asean University to become the Phnom Penh International University (PPIU). But in 2008, PPIU separated into two parts. One of them is still called the PPIU and the other became the IIC University of Technology.

== Structure of Lepro Tech ==
- CEO Creative Director: Sreejith S Nair.
- CFO Business Developer: Thoufeeq Aslam.
- CTO Infrastructure Developer: Arjun Babu C.

== Structure of IIC University of Technology ==
- Rector Name: Dr. CHHUON Chanthon
- Vice Rector Name: Po Bonna.
