= Education in Cambodia =

Ministry of Education
- Minister of Education: Hang Chuon Naron

National education budget (2019)
- Budget: $915 million

General details
- Primary languages: Khmer
- System type: National, Private
- Establishment: 1931

Literacy (2017)
- Total: 88.5%
- Male: 91.1%
- Female: 86.2%

Enrollment
- Total: 3,248,479

Education in Cambodia is controlled by the state through the Ministry of Education in a national level and by the Department of Education at the provincial level. The Cambodian education system includes pre-school, primary, secondary education, higher education and non-formal education. The education system includes the development of sport, information technology education, research development and technical education. School enrollment has increased during the 2000s in Cambodia. USAID data shows that in 2011 primary enrollment reached 96% of the child population, lower secondary school 34% and upper secondary 21%.

The Human Rights Measurement Initiative (HRMI) finds that Cambodia is fulfilling only 68.2% of what it should be fulfilling for the right to education based on the country's level of income. HRMI breaks down the right to education by looking at the rights to both primary education and secondary education. While taking into consideration Cambodia's income level, the nation is achieving 86.2% of what should be possible based on its resources (income) for primary education but only 50.4% for secondary education.

== Education in the constitution ==
The Constitution of Cambodia establishes that the state shall protect and upgrade citizens' rights to quality education at all levels, guaranteeing that all citizens have equal opportunity to earn a living (Article 66). The state shall adopt an education program "according to the principle of modern pedagogy including technology and foreign languages," as well as the states controls public and private schools and classrooms at all levels (Article 67).

== History ==
=== Traditional Buddhist education ===
Before the 20th century, traditional education in Cambodia was handled by the local wat, and the monks and priests ("bhikku") were the teachers. The students were almost entirely boys, and the education was limited to memorizing Buddhist chants in Pali.

During the period of the French protectorate, an educational system based on the French model was inaugurated alongside the traditional system. Initially, the French neglected education in Cambodia. Only seven high school students graduated in 1931, and only 50,000 to 600,000 children were enrolled in primary school in 1936. In the year immediately following independence, the number of students rapidly increased. Vickery suggests that education of any kind was considered an "absolute good" by all Cambodians and that this attitude eventually created a large group of unemployed or underemployed graduates by the late 1960s.

=== The French model ===
From the early 20th century until 1975, the system of mass education operated on the French model. The education system was divided into primary, secondary, higher, and specialized levels. Public education was under the jurisdiction of the Ministry of Education, which exercised full control over the system. It established syllabi, hired and paid teachers, provided supplies, and inspected schools. An inspector of primary education, who had considerable authority, was assigned to each province. Cultural committees under the Ministry of Education were responsible for "enriching the Cambodian language."

Primary education, divided into two cycles of three years each, was carried out in state- and temple-run schools. Successful completion of a final state examination led to the award of a certificate after each cycle. The primary education curriculum consisted of arithmetic, history, ethics, civics, drafting, geography, hygiene, language, and science. In addition, the curriculum included physical education and manual work.

French language instruction began in the second year. Khmer was the language of instruction in the first cycle, but French was used in the second cycle and thereafter. By the early 1960s, Khmer was used more widely in primary education. In the 1980s, the primary school ran from the first to the fourth grade. Theoretically, one primary school served each village.

Secondary education also was divided into two cycles: one of four years teaching at a college, followed by one of three years taught at a lyceum. Upon completion of the first cycle, students could take a state examination. Successful candidates received a secondary diploma. Upon completion of the first two years of the second cycle, students could take a state examination for the first baccalaureate, and, following their final year, they could take a similar examination for the second baccalaureate.

The Cambodian secondary curriculum was similar to that found in France. Beginning in 1967, the last three years of secondary school were split into three sections according to major subjects — letters, mathematics and technology; agriculture; and biology. In the late 1950s and the early 1960s, the country emphasized technical education. In the PRK (People's Republic of Kampuchea), secondary education was reduced to six years.

Higher education lagged well behind primary and secondary education until the late 1950s. The only facility in Cambodia for higher education before the 1960s was the National Institute of Legal, Political, and Economic Studies, which trained civil servants. In the late 1950s it had about 250 students. Wealthy Cambodians and those who had government scholarships sought university-level education abroad. Students attended schools in France, but after independence, increasing numbers enrolled at universities in the United States, Canada, China, the Soviet Union, and the German Democratic Republic (East Germany).

By 1970 universities with a total enrollment of nearly 9,000 students served Cambodia. The largest, the University of Phnom Penh, had nearly 4,570 male and more than 730 female students in eight departments— letters and humanities, science and technology, law and economics, medicine, pharmacy, commercial science, teacher training, and higher teacher training. Universities operated in the provinces of Kampong Cham, Takeo, Battambang. In Phnom Penh, the University of Agricultural Sciences and the University of Fine Arts offered training. The increased fighting following the 1970 coup closed the three provincial universities.

=== Destruction of the education system by the Khmer Rouge ===
During the Khmer Rouge regime, education was dealt a severe setback, and the great strides made in literacy and in education during the two decades following independence were obliterated systematically. Schools were closed. Educated people and teachers were subjected to, at the least, suspicion and harsh treatment and at the worst, execution. At the beginning of the 1970s, more than 20,000 teachers lived in Cambodia. Only about 5,000 of the teachers remained 10 years later.

Soviet sources report that 90 percent of teachers were killed under the Khmer Rouge regime. Only 50 of the 725 university instructors, 207 of the 2,300 secondary school teachers, and 2,717 of the 21,311 primary school teachers survived. The meagre educational fare was centred on precepts of the Khmer revolution; young people were rigidly indoctrinated, but literacy was neglected. An entire generation of Cambodian children grew up illiterate.

After the Khmer Rouge were driven from power, the education system had to be re-created from almost nothing. Illiteracy had climbed to more than 40 percent, and most young people under the age of 14 lacked any basic education.

== Development History ==
Education began making a slow comeback, following the establishment of the People's Republic of Kampuchea. In 1986 the following main institutions of higher education were reported in the PRK:

- the Faculty of Medicine and Pharmacy (reopened in 1980 with a six-year course of study)
- the Armchair Dang Faculty of Agriculture (opened in 1985)
- the Kampuchea-USSR Friendship Technical Institute (now Institute of Technology of Cambodia (TIC)) (which includes technical and engineering curricula)
- the Institute of Languages (Vietnamese, German, Russian, and Spanish are taught)
- the Institute of Commerce, the Center for Pedagogical Education (formed in 1979)
- the Normal Advanced School
- the School of Fine Arts.

Writing about the education system under the PRK, Trickery states, "Both the government and the people have demonstrated enthusiasm for education ... The list of subjects covered is little different from that of prewar years. There is perhaps more time devoted to Khmer language and literature than before the war and, until the 1984-85 school year, at least, no foreign language instruction". He notes that the secondary school syllabus calls for four hours of foreign language instruction per week in Russian, German, or Vietnamese but that there were no teachers available.

Martin describes the education system in the PRK as based very closely on the Vietnamese model, pointing out that even the terms for primary and secondary education have been changed into direct translations of the Vietnamese terms. Under the PRK regime, according to Martin, the primary cycle had four instead of six classes, the first level of secondary education had three instead of four classes, and the second level of secondary education had three classes. Martin writes that not every young person could go to school because schooling in towns and in the countryside required enrolment fees.

Civil servants paid (in 1987) 25 riels per month to send a child to school, and others paid up to 150 riels per month. According to Martin, "Access to tertiary studies [was] reserved for children whose parents work[ed] for the regime and [had] demonstrated proof of their loyalty to the regime." She writes that, from the primary level on, the contents of all textbooks except for alphabet books were politically oriented and dealt "more specifically with Vietnam." From the beginning of the secondary cycle, Vietnamese language study was compulsory.

== Buddhist education ==
Before the French organized a Western-style education system, the Buddhist wat, with monks as teachers, provided the only formal education in Cambodia. The monks traditionally regarded their main education function as the teaching of Buddhist doctrine and history and the importance of gaining merit. Other subjects were regarded as secondary. In this way schoolboys — girls were not allowed to study in these institutions — were taught to read and to write Khmer, and they were instructed in the rudiments of Buddhism.

In 1933 a secondary school system for novice monks was created in the Buddhist religious system. Many wat schools had so-called Pauli schools that provided three years of elementary education from which the student could compete for entrance into the Buddhist lyceums. Graduates of these lyceums could sit for the entrance examination to the Buddhist University in Phnom Penh. The curriculum of the Buddhist schools consisted of the study of Cali, Buddhist doctrine, and Khmer, along with mathematics, Cambodian history and geography, science, hygiene, civics, and agriculture. Buddhist instruction was under the authority of the Ministry of Religion.

Nearly 600 Buddhist primary schools, with an enrolment of more than 10,000 novices and with 800 monks as instructors, existed in 1962. The Preach Samaritan Buddhist Lyceum —a four-year institution in Phnom Penh founded in 1955— included courses in Tali, in Sanskrit, and in Khmer, as well as in many modern disciplines. In 1962 the student body numbered 680. The school's graduates could continue their studies in the Preach Sihanouk Haj Buddhist University created in 1959.

The university offered three cycles of instruction; the doctoral degree was awarded after successful completion of the third cycle. In 1962 there were 107 students enrolled in the Buddhist University. By the 1969–70 academic year, more than 27,000 students were attending Buddhist religious elementary schools, 1,328 students were at Buddhist lyceums, and 176 students were enrolled at the Buddhist University.

The Buddhist Institute was a research institution formed in 1930 from the Royal Library. The institute contained a library, record and photograph collections, and a museum. Several commissions were part of the institute. A folklore commission published collections of Cambodian folktales, a Tripitaka Commission completed a translation of the Buddhist canon into Khmer, and a dictionary commission produced a definitive two-volume dictionary of Khmer.

== Private education ==
For a portion of the urban population in Cambodia, private education was important in the years before the communist takeover. Some private schools were operated by ethnic or religious minorities —Chinese, Vietnamese, European, Roman Catholic, and Muslim— so that children could study their own language, culture, or religion. Other schools provided education to indigenous children who could not gain admission to a public school. Attendance at some of the private schools, especially those in Phnom Penh, conferred a certain amount of prestige on the student and on the student's family.

The private education system included Chinese-language schools, Vietnamese-language (often Roman Catholic) schools, French-language schools, English-language schools, and Khmer-language schools. Enrolment in private primary schools rose from 32,000 in the early 1960s to about 53,500 in 1970, although enrolment in private secondary schools dropped from about 19,000 to fewer than 8,700 for the same period. In 1962 there were 195 Chinese schools, 40 Khmer schools, 15 Vietnamese schools, and 14 French schools operating in Cambodia. Private secondary education was represented by several High Schools, notably the Lyceum Descartes in Phenom Pen.

All of Vietnamese schools in Phnom Penh and some of Chinese schools were closed by the government decree in 1970.

There has been a re-emergence of private schools in Phnom Penh. Organisations from Turkey and the U.S. operate private schools and charities. Mazama International operates two elementary and high schools, and A New Day Cambodia pays for the housing and education of 100 students of different ages.

Several non-governmental organisations dedicated to education provide this service oriented to unprivileged communities in rural areas, street children, children infected by HIV, handicapped children and youth and other groups. Some organisations specialised in technical education offered to young people after high school completion and as an alternative to university. In 2012 Don Bosch Cambodia engaged 1,463 students to technical programs in provinces, but there are public and private technical schools like the National Technical Training Institute, the Phenom Pen Poly Technical School and many others.

== Early childhood care and education (EKE) ==
Cambodia has a population of about 14 million, with around 1.5 million children below 5 years. In 2007, when the UNICEF study was conducted, it had an under-5 mortality of 91 and a high rate (37 percent) of stunting.

By 2010, the under-5 mortality rate had decreased to 58, but there still is a high rate of moderate to severe stunting (40 percent in 2006–2010) in Cambodia. In 2005–2006, the enrolment rate in EKE for 3-5-year-old in Cambodia was about 12 percent overall. For 5- to 6-year-old, it was 27.27 percent. In state pre-schools 21.23 percent; private pre-schools 1.43 percent; community pre-schools 3.96 percent and home-based programmed 0.84 percent.

More recent figures indicate that in 2009–2010, the mental rate of 3- to 5-year-olds was 20 percent and that it was 38 percent for 5-year-old. The Cambodian government would like to give priority for ECCE to children from poor and remote backgrounds, but it does not have the funds to increase state pre-school provision or increase the national budget for ECCE.

There are three main types of pre-school programs in Cambodia: state pre-schools, community pre-schools, and home-based programs. State pre-school teachers have the highest academic and professional qualifications, having completed a 2-year full-time teacher-training course after Grade 12, and receive a government salary. State pre-schools cost more than other programs. They operate a 3-hour program, five days a week during the 38-week school year. Instruction is provided in a proper classroom with a roof, posters with curriculum-related materials are displayed on the walls, and toilets and running water are available. Children have access to paper, pencils, books, and toys.

In community pre-schools, educational experiences for 3 to 5-year-olds are provided by a member of the village who has typically received 10 days of initial training and who participates in refresher training courses for 3 to 6 days a year. The program operates for two hours a day, 5 days a week, for 24 to 36 weeks a year. Community pre-school teachers receive a stipend each month for their work, and this is expected to be met by the village. Most classes are held under teachers’ houses and there are health and safety issues when this is the case. Further, parents tend to send all their children, including those less than 3 years of age, to the community pre-school, making the job of the teachers very difficult.

Home-based programs are offered through mothers’ groups formed in villages. Again, the government expects each village to provide funding and resources through the local commune council. The groups are facilitated by a ‘core’ mother in the village who has generally received a 2-day training course in the use of the program materials. Typically, the groups meet early in the morning before women go to work in the fields. Home-based program materials include advice on nutrition, general well-being and developmental stages.

== Current challenges ==
=== Resources ===
In the first decade of the 21st century, Cambodia allocated around 9% of its annual budget into education to improve its quality. However, 83% of the funds are allocated to servicing remunerations and operation expenses, which might suggest rent seeking in the process. That leaves little funds for schools’ facilities maintenance and to provide proper teaching materials like computers and internet.

Cambodia's public expenditure on education accounted for 2.6% of GDP in 2010, up from 1.6% of GDP in 2007. The share allocated to higher education remains modest (0.38% of GDP, or 15% of the total). Only Myanmar (0.15% of GDP in 2011) and the Philippines (0.32% of GDP in 2009) devote less to higher education in Southeast Asia. Moreover, Cambodia still ranks lowest in Southeast Asia for the education dimension of the World Bank's Knowledge-Economy Index.

There is insufficient staff in schools, with 58,776 teachers teaching 2,311,107 primary school students and only 27,240 teachers teaching 637,629 lower secondary students. The teacher-pupil ratio is thus very high and might result in inefficiency. In addition, over 60% of the primary and secondary school teachers received at most secondary education, which thus compromises the quality of education.

A severe scarcity of schools and classrooms, particularly in the rural areas, limit the number of children who have access to education. Most Cambodian villages have a primary school, but they are not complete and do not offer a full 1-6 grade curriculum. Cambodian children face greater difficulty in the pursuit of a higher level of education, because secondary schools are in less than 10% of the villages. Only 5.4% of Cambodian villages have a lower secondary school and only 2% of them have an upper secondary school.

Students can only pursue higher education if they can afford the fees. Therefore, further education becomes inaccessible to the bulk of potential pupils. The percentage of population in each group attending an educational institution is shown in Table 1, indicating that only approximately 14.37% of the population can afford to pursue tertiary education:

Table 1

<6	6-14	15-19	20-24	25+
28.91%	80.19%	51.83%	14.37%	1.20%

=== Policy implementation ===
Provincial/Municipal Offices of Education (POE) are responsible for supporting the Ministry in implementing educational policies, preparing and submitting plans for further development of education, providing data and statistics of schools. However, there is a lack of congruence between research and policy, linked possibly to the inadequacy of budget and research facilities, that exemplifies the weakness in analytical research and development for its education system. As a result, there is a significant gap between policy formation, implementation and monitoring in the education system that does not target the specific problems that the educators and children face.

=== Gender disparity ===
Although the literacy rate and the number of girls graduating from primary school in Cambodia are increasing, the number of girls who drop out from secondary education is much higher than the number of boys. In 2008, the ratio of girls to boys in upper secondary is 75% and only 50% in tertiary education. This disparity can be partly attributed to the higher opportunity cost of sending girls to school as there will be one less helping hand to earn an extra income. The trade-off between school participation and economic activity increases as the child gets older and this trend is particularly prevalent among girls. In 2008, 23% of young women were illiterate compared to 16% of men.

=== Low participation ===
The education levels of the Cambodian population (2007) compared with those of an ideally educated society as defined by the International Labour Organization (ILO)

In 2007, while around 90 percent of children completed primary education, only 35 percent completed lower-secondary education and only 15 percent progressed to upper-secondary education and beyond. This left around 3.1 million youngsters, or 85 percent of 15–24-year-olds, not receiving any advanced schooling. The situation is even worse when it comes to technical and vocational training, where the number of enrolled students aged between 14 and 20 barely accounts for 2 percent of this population segment.

This results in a very high percentage of the Cambodian labour force lacking any formal trade qualifications. The vast majority of university students come from wealthy families living in the cities, whereas the majority of basic-level technicians come from low-income families.

=== Dropout rates ===
Statistically, from 2005 to 2009, primary school enrolment rates for males and females were at 90 and 87 percent respectively while the attendance levels are at 84 and 86 percent of the students heading to school. This suggests that not all the children in Cambodia are able to consistently attend the school's curriculum due to possibly financial reasons, health care issues and even transportation costs.

There are disparities between the perceived data to that of the official administrative data rendering the primary school graduation rates. By survey, 92 percent of the children should have completed primary education until the final grade. Formal school's administrative data suggests that only a mere 43 percent have completed primary education. The disparity in the data arises due to the means whereby a child can receive education in Cambodia, formal, non-formal and informal.

=== Lack of awareness ===
It was established at the World Summit in Johannesburg that education plays a pivotal role in achieving a nation's sustainable development. The lack of awareness of the need for education for sustainable development (ERS) is significantly apparent in Cambodia amidst the financial poverty it faces. The priority for the nation's children is mainly as a contributor to the family's finances and not the establishment of their education.

=== Tertiary education ===
In 2011, Cambodia has tertiary enrollment rate of 10%, which is low when compared with other nations.

Cambodia's higher education lacks world recognition and is not acknowledged by QS World University Rankings.

Furthermore, there is inadequate communication between schools and corporations. This thus hinders the necessary adjustment of the curriculum to equip the students with skills to meet the demand of the labour market. Graduates find difficulty integrating into the workforce.

Higher education institutions are mainly in major cities. Hence, students have to bear the cost of transport and living expenses in addition to their school fees. Furthermore, those who manage to find alternative places to live are facing the risk of being drawn into an increasingly rampant drug culture or being coerced into prostitution.

Rankings by the World Economic Forum (compiled 2013-2014 but using available data) place Cambodia 116th out of 148 nations, behind Thailand (66th), Vietnam (95th) and neighbouring Laos (111th).

=== Poverty hindering education ===
Given that the poverty line in the rural areas of Cambodia is set at US$0.25 per person per daily consumption, 53.7% of the population in Siem Reap is living below the poverty line. Due to poverty, children in Cambodia are forced to give up education to work and supplement the family's income; see Child labour in Cambodia. The cost of sending their children to school is very high in some families, making it almost impossible for the children to receive education.

Close to 20% of Cambodian children ages 5–9 are employed. The figures then rise to 47% for children between ages 10–14 and 34% for ages 15–17. Among the number of working children of ages 5 to 17, only 45% have the chance to attend school.

Non-economic productive activities such as housework tend to start earlier than economic activities, although less intensively, causing children in Cambodia to be performing ‘double-duty’ — they are involved in housework and economic activity, leaving them little or no time to go to school. Non-economic activities add an average of eight hours per week to the work burden of the economically active children, leading to an average weekly working hours of almost 31. Children having to work before going to school can affect their literacy and numeracy test scores, by nine percentage points after accounting for the differences in school quality. This shows that work affects school enrolment and ability of children to derive educational benefit from schooling.

A 2007 report by the Cambodian NGO Education Partnership (NEP) suggested that education costs for each child averaged $108 annually — 9 percent of the average annual income of each family. Clearly, in a nation where having four or five children is very common, the education costs become very significant.

The NEP study found that these fees were the main reason given for children not attending school and that a quarter of parents were unaware that their children had a right to free education.

=== Teachers ===
Teachers in Cambodia earn US$120 to US$150 a month. They resort to collecting informal school fees of $0.02 to $0.05 per day from students to supplement their salaries. This is for teachers in the city only, and it is spreading to some of the provincial ones. This further deters children from attending schools as they cannot afford to pay for the informal school fees. With an average of three children per household in Cambodia, the informal school fees will add up to a significant amount, making it almost impossible for parents to send their children to school. Though there are efforts by the Cambodia government to promise free provision of education, the collection of informal school fees is a huge deterrence for children to attend school.

Due to the shortage of teachers in Cambodia, teachers employed often lack proper training and have a high student-teacher ratio. This has led to poor quality of education and high grade-repeat rates among students. From the data, in Siem Reap province, 12% of primary school students failed to be promoted to the next grade level at the end of the 2006–07 school year. Most teachers in Cambodia, especially those in the more remote areas, had not completed their secondary education. With a fast-growing youth population, if teachers are required to possess a certain minimum qualification, the problem of teacher shortage will be more severe.

=== Lack of resources ===
Due to a lack of resources and minimum government funding for schools, there is a shortage of teaching material and school facilities. According to UNESCO, merely 1.6% of Cambodia's GDP (gross domestic product) is spent on education. Even though the Cambodian government promises to provide $1.50-$1.75 per student per year to each primary school for teaching materials and operating costs, the sum is often insufficient to cover the basic operational cost of the schools. Teachers often have to use their own money to buy items like chalk.

=== Corruption in education ===
Due to corruption in most parts of Cambodia's institutions, the education institution is not spared. Although there is an increasing awareness of the importance of education which directly correlates with employability, citizens are merely attending schools for the sake of obtaining paper qualifications. There is no great impetus to learn and to increase one's productivity. The quality of education in Cambodia remains doubtful and not all citizens are capable of undertaking tasks that their paper qualifications state they are capable of.

Pass rates at schools are not comparable due to bribery and the skewed level of difficulty of tests handed out in schools. On top of this, the Ministry of Education has to decrease the average passing scores to increase the pass rates of students, or the unemployment rate in the country will be higher than reported.

==== Relation with the development of nation ====
The low 40% enrolment rate at secondary level and 5% at tertiary level has caused the majority of the Cambodian population not being able to converse in English, which is the common language used in the commercial industries.

Bill Hayden, Australian's foreign minister said in 1983 that "the only way for Australia to help Cambodia in the reconstruction is to help them to learn English", so that they can request aid, access modern technology and the commercial world, as well as share knowledge to help Cambodia develop. Failing to educate women can also lead to an economic cost of US$92 billion worldwide each year, thus suggesting that educating more women in Cambodia would lead to more economic gains.

=== New Education Minister Reforms the System ===
August 2014 was the when Cambodian's grade 12 students took their final high school test to get into universities. However, 2014 was the year that the new minister, Hang Chuon Naron, eliminated corruption and cheating during the test. Students could not bring cell phones or calculators into the rooms. Teachers did not have the chance to tell students the answers to the exam questions. The government employed monitors to watch the test-takers carefully. Therefore, only 26% of all students in grade 12 passed the test.

=== The role of NGOs ===
There is a significant presence in Cambodia of schools built and continuously funded by overseas supporters, and of education-support NGOs that assist with training, resources and funding. The role of these NGOs is significant to the extent that the Minister of MOEYS is on public record as saying that the input of these NGOs is an integral part of the education strategy and that without the NGOs the government would be unable to reach its education targets.

The relationship between MOEYS and the NGO sector is integral to the 2010 Education Strategic Plan which stated as an objective:

Expand public/NGO/ community partnerships in formal and non-formal education in border, remote and disadvantaged areas as well as increase support for the provision of local life skills and vocational training and basic/required professional skills responsive to the needs of the social and labour market.

In 2012 and 2013 the MOEYS rolled out a registration process designed to integrate NGOs into the overall education framework and to ensure NGOs meet standards in teaching quality, physical environment and governance. Registration provides a means for some government leverage or control over this sector, as well as a clearer means of gathering relevant statistical information. The role of education-related NGOs is likely to become more closely entwined with MOEYS over time. The Shinta Mani Foundation and the VegVoyages Foundation run an after-school program in rural Cambodia to strengthen English language skills. The program also teaches conscious living, compassion, animal welfare, conservation, recycling, and environment protection, and better health.

=== Important Schools in Cambodia ===
Cambodia has a number of prestigious schools that play a significant role in the country's educational development. These institutions are known for their academic achievements and contributions to the overall education system. Prominent schools in Cambodia include Northbridge International School Cambodia (NISC), which offers the International Baccalaureate (IB) program, and the American Intercon School, known for its commitment to bilingual education, DK SchoolHouse, known for their Scandinavian curriculum and small classes.

Despite these advancements, there remain challenges in expanding access to high-quality education across the country. Most of these renowned schools are concentrated in Phnom Penh and larger cities, which creates disparities in access to quality education for students in rural areas. This gap in access to top-tier education in Cambodia highlights the ongoing need for improved infrastructure and resources in provincial areas, where schools often lack the facilities and teaching quality found in urban centers.

== See also ==
- List of universities in Cambodia
- Ministry of Education, Youth and Sport, of Cambodia
