= Kirirom Institute of Technology =

Private university in Cambodia

Coordinates: 11°18′53″N 104°04′02″E

- វិទ្យាស្ថានបច្ចេកវិទ្យាគិរីរម្យ
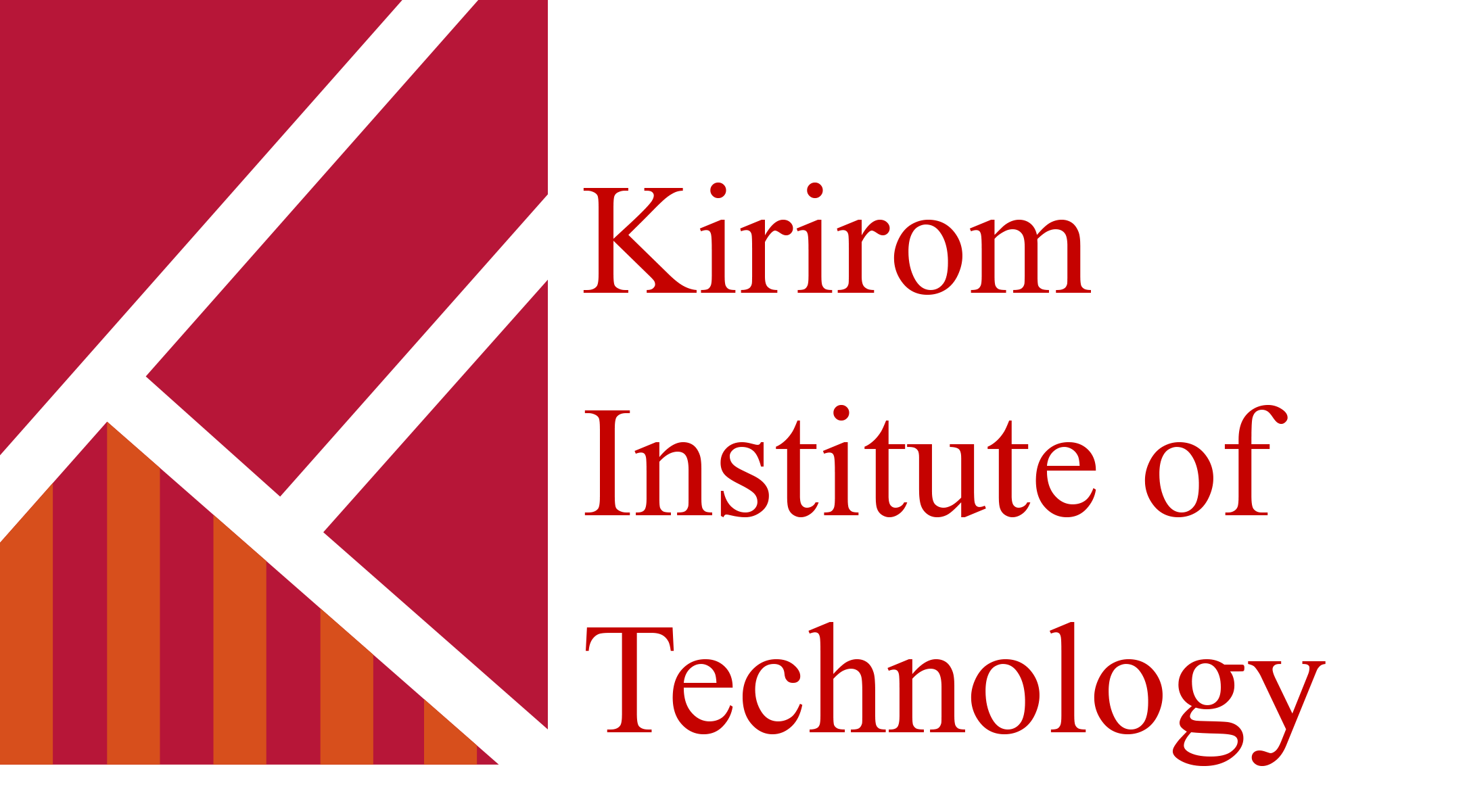
- Established: 2014; 12 years ago
- Chairman: Sachio Semmoto
- President: Masamu Kamaga
- Students: 228 (2018)
- Location: Kampong Speu, Cambodia
- Campus: Private
- Website: https://kit.edu.kh/

Kirirom Institute of Technology (KIT) is a private university in Cambodia that focuses on IT and was founded in 2014. Currently, it consists of two departments, Software Engineering and International Leaders Hospitality Management with around 230 students from Cambodia and Japan.

== History ==
In 2014, Takeshi Izuka founded and started KIT from 25 Cambodian students.
From 2015 to 2017, 25 to 30 Cambodian students enrolled each year.
In 2018, 70% of the first graduates were employed to Japanese IT company. Enrollment of Cambodian students increased to 105 students and 8 Japanese students enrolled.
In 2019, new department, International Leaders Hospitality Management started and 10 Cambodian students and total of 20 Japanese students enrolled.

== Location ==
Located at an altitude of 600 meters in Kirirom National Park, Chambak Commune, Phnom Sruoch District, Kampong Speu Province, Cambodia.

== Academic ==
=== Software Engineering ===
Software engineering was established in 2014. All programs are delivered in English by professional lecturers from India for IT-related subjects, the Philippines for professional English curriculum and Cambodia for Khmer History and other social-related programs. Students are offered with internship projects offered by virtual companies in KIT, which is to make actual products and real-life practices using latest technologies.

=== International Leadership Hospitality Management ===
International Leadership Hospitality Management was established in 2019. The curriculum involves understanding of successful management and leadership practice in the field of hospitality contexts. Students also go through industry experience internship, work experience, and interaction with industry people.

== Facilities ==
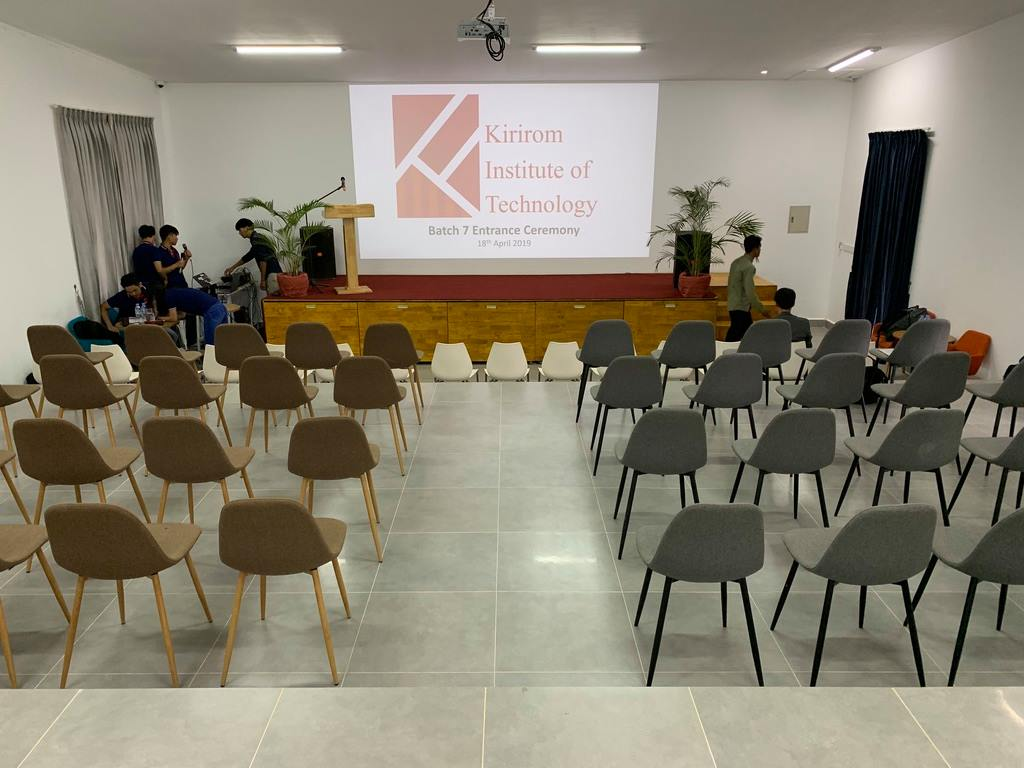
Inside the Auditorium

=== Green Arcade 1 ===
- Administrator Office
- Library
- Laboratory
- Classrooms

=== Green Arcade 2 ===
==== Ground Floor ====
- Co-working Space
- Auditorium
- Classrooms

==== Underground Floor ====
Share offices: for company office of the virtual companies in KIT.

== University System ==
=== Internship program ===
Internship program is organized by the form of virtual companies that are managed by students and having a president for each company. Each virtual company is assigned with number of projects and all students take in charge under the president.

=== Peer-to-peer learning ===
KIT encourages all students to have peer-to-peer learning. As a full boarding university, students live in dorms of 4 to 8 and provides an environment peer-to-peer learning happens naturally. Furthermore, forum groups of 7 to 9 members is formed and led by student forum leader to catalyze their study and to learn leadership.
