= Cambodia University of Specialties =

University in Phnom Penh, Cambodia

- សាកលវិទ្យាល័យឯកទេសកម្ពុជា
- Other names: CUS
- Former names: Cambodian Institute for Specialties
- Established: 2002; 24 years ago
- Location: Phnom Penh, Cambodia; 11.591260°N 104.899587°E

Cambodia University of Specialties (CUS) is a private university based in Phnom Penh, Cambodia. The university, established in 2002, is one of the largest private universities in Cambodia.
