= University of Puthisastra =

Private university in Phnom Penh, Cambodia

- សាកលវិទ្យាល័យពុទ្ធិសាស្រ្ត (Khmer)
- Motto: គោរពខ្លួនឯង គោរពអ្នកដទៃ អភិវឌ្ឍសង្គម
- Motto in English: Respect yourself, respect others, develop the society
- Type: Private
- Established: 2007; 19 years ago
- Chancellor: Sok Puthyvuth
- Vice-Chancellor: Prof. IAN Rouse
- Location: 55 St. 180, Phnom Penh, Cambodia
- Website: www.puthisastra.edu.kh

The University of Puthisastra (Note: Khmer: សាកលវិទ្យាល័យពុទ្ធិសាស្ត្រ, UNGEGN: Sakâlôvĭtyéaloăy Pŭtthĭsastr, ALA-LC: Sākalavidyālăy Buddhisāstr) (UP) is a private university in Phnom Penh, Cambodia. UP was recognised by the Royal Government of Cambodia under a sub-decree signed by Prime Minister Hun Sen on 15 November 2007. UP has also been awarded full accreditation, for its Foundation Year Course, by the Accreditation Committee of Cambodia (ACC).

With more than a decade of excellence in the field of health science and technology, UP trains doctors, dentists, pharmacists, nurses, midwives, laboratory technicians, computer scientists and technology entrepreneurs. Eight departments at the University of the Philippines specialize in health sciences and science and technology. These include Medicine, Dentistry, Pharmacy, Nursing, Midwifery, Medical Laboratory, Information and Communication Technologies, and a Center for Health Counselling.
