= Build Bright University =

University in Cambodia

Coordinates: 13°20′54.43″N 103°50′47.21″E

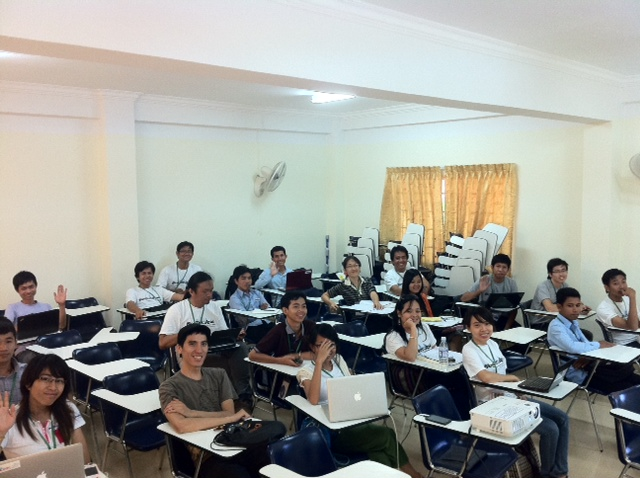
BlogFest.Asia 2012 participants attending Wikimedia workshop at the University.

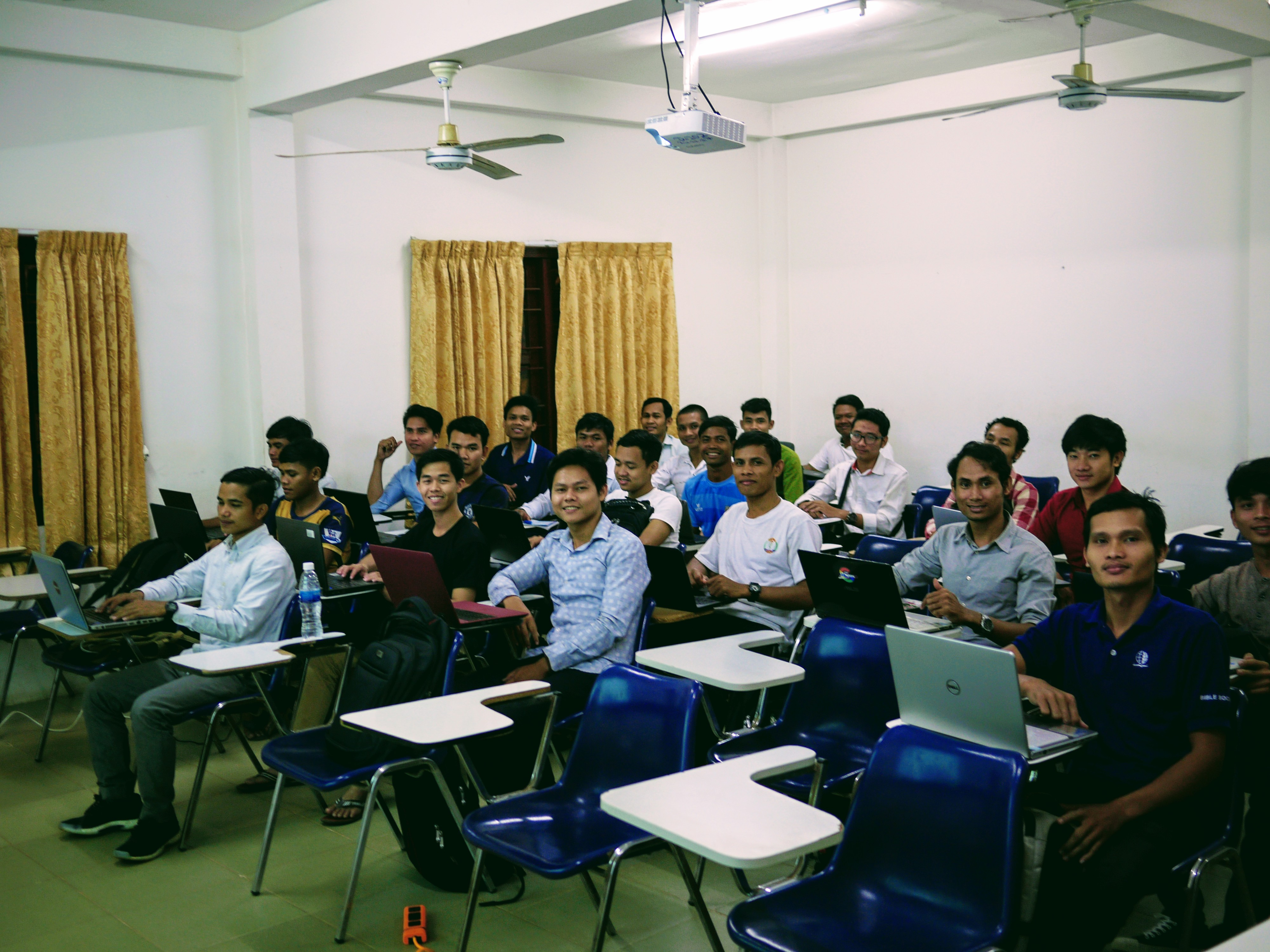
Wikipedia Workshop at Build Bright University, Siem Reap on 23 February 2018.

Build Bright University (BBU; Khmer: សាកលវិទ្យាល័យបៀលប្រាយ, UNGEGN: Sakâlôvĭtyéaloăy Biĕl Bray) is a university in Cambodia with eight campuses, in Phnom Penh, and the provinces of Siem Reap, Battambang, Banteay Meanchey, Sihanoukville, Takéo, Ratanakiri and Stung Treng.

The university in Siem Reap is the largest university in Siem Reap with an enrollment of 5000 students.

== See also ==
- Build Bright United FC
