= City University, Cambodia =

Private university in Phnom Penh, Cambodia

City University, Cambodia is a private university for Higher Education in Phnom Penh, Cambodia. It was formed in 2005 (21 years ago) with fully accredited by the sub-degree of the government. The university offers many courses at undergraduate and Postgraduate level of studies including Doctoral studies and Postdoctoral research City University is accredited by government of Cambodia with the Ministry of Education, Youth and Sport. City University is supervised by the (ACC) Accreditation Committee of Cambodia. The university offers bachelor's degree programs and master's degree programs. City University offered programs within various Academic Departments and Faculties. City University is listed in the World Higher Education Database (WHED) produced by the International Association of Universities in conjunction with UNESCO.
