= Cambodian Mekong University =

Private university in Phnom Penh, Cambodia

Coordinates: 11.5575°N 104.8870°E

- Motto: 'The University that cares for the value of education'
- Type: Private
- Established: 2003; 23 years ago
- President: Ban Thero
- Location: 9B, Street 271, Sangkat Tek Thla, Khan Sen Sok, Phnom Penh, Cambodia
- Website: mekong.edu.kh

Cambodian Mekong University (CMU) is a private university located in Phnom Penh, Cambodia. It is registered as a private higher education institution with the Ministry of Education, Youth and Sports. The university was established in 2003. The current chancellor is Mr.Ban Thero, a graduate of Southern Cross University and the University of Adelaide.
