= Norton University =

University in Phnom Penh, Cambodia

- សាកលវិទ្យាល័យន័រតុន
- Motto: អភិវឌ្ឍន៍អនាគតអ្នកដឹកនាំ
- Motto in English: Educating Tomorrow’s Leaders
- Type: Private
- Established: 1996; 30 years ago
- Chancellor: Prof. Chan Sok Khieng
- Vice-Chancellor: Prof. Ung Vann Thouen
- Location: Keo Chenda St., Phnom Penh, Cambodia; 11°35′17″N 104°55′48″E
- Campus: Phnom Penh, Cambodia
- Nickname: NU
- Mascot: The Lion
- Website: www.norton-u.com

Norton University (NU; Khmer: សាកលវិទ្យាល័យន័រតុន, ស.ន., UNGEGN: Sakâlôvĭtyéaloăy Noărtŏn, S.N.) is a private university in Cambodia registered with the Ministry of Education, Youth and Sport. It was established in 1996. The university was one of the first private Cambodian educational institutions.

Norton University is considered to be the best IT Education Center in Cambodia years after its establishment, and was chosen by National ICT Development Authority (NiDA), Ministry of Post-Telecommunications (MPTC), and International Data Group (IDG) to receive the award in 2010. The university has two campuses both based in Phnom Penh.

Professor Chan Sok Khieng is the rector of Norton University, and Professor Un Van Thouen is the vice rector.
