= Ministry of Education, Youth and Sport (Cambodia) =

Government ministry of Cambodia

- ក្រសួងអប់រំ យុវជន និងកីឡា

Agency overview
- Formed: 24 January 1996
- Jurisdiction: Government of Cambodia
- Headquarters: 80 Norodom Blvd (41), Phnom Penh 12205
- Annual budget: $915,000,000 (2019)
- Minister responsible: Dr. Hangchuon Naron, Minister of Education, Youth and Sport
- Website: www.moeys.gov.kh/

The Ministry of Education, Youth and Sport (MoEYS; Khmer: ក្រសួងអប់រំ យុវជន និងកីឡា, Krâsuŏng Ábrum, Yŭvôchôn nĭng Keila) is the government ministry responsible for promoting and regulating education, youth and sport development in Cambodia.

As of 2020, the Minister of Education, Youth and Sport is Dr. Hang Chuon Naron. The ministry's main offices are in Phnom Penh.

== History ==
The ministry was established on 24 January 1996, although others date it to 1992 or 1993.

In 1999, the Ministry conducted an extensive literacy survey throughout Cambodia. Unlike the 1997 literacy survey done by the Ministry of Planning, which only consisted of yes–no questions according to UNESCO, the 1999 survey included a reading and writing test, and its results revealed that only 37.1% of the adult Cambodian population were functionally literate. In comparison, the 1997 survey reported a 66% literacy rate.

== Directorates ==
The Ministry has six directorates:

- Directorate General of Administration and Finance
- Directorate General of Education
- Directorate General of Higher Education
- Directorate General of Policies and Planning
- Directorate General of Sport
- Directorate General of Youth
- Inspectorate General

== Ministers (since 1979) ==
Minister	In office		Party
Minister	From	To	Party
Chan Ven	February 1979	January 1982	KPRP
Pen Navuth	January 1982	January 1990	KPRP
Yos Son	January 1990	October 1992	CPP
Oem Chhunloem	October 1992	2 July 1993	CPP
Mom Choemhuy	2 July 1993	24 September 1993	CPP
Tol Laoh	2 July 1993	24 September 1993	?
Kiet Sokonth	2 July 1993	24 September 1993	?
Ung Huot	24 September 1993	24 October 1994	FUNCINPEC
Tol Laoh	24 October 1994	2003	CPP
Kol Pheng	2003	2008	CPP
Im Sethy	2008	24 September 2013	CPP
Hangchuon Naron	24 September 2013	present	CPP

== See also ==
- Education in Cambodia
- Government of Cambodia
- List of universities in Cambodia
