= Cambodian Memorial Sites =

UNESCO World Heritage Site
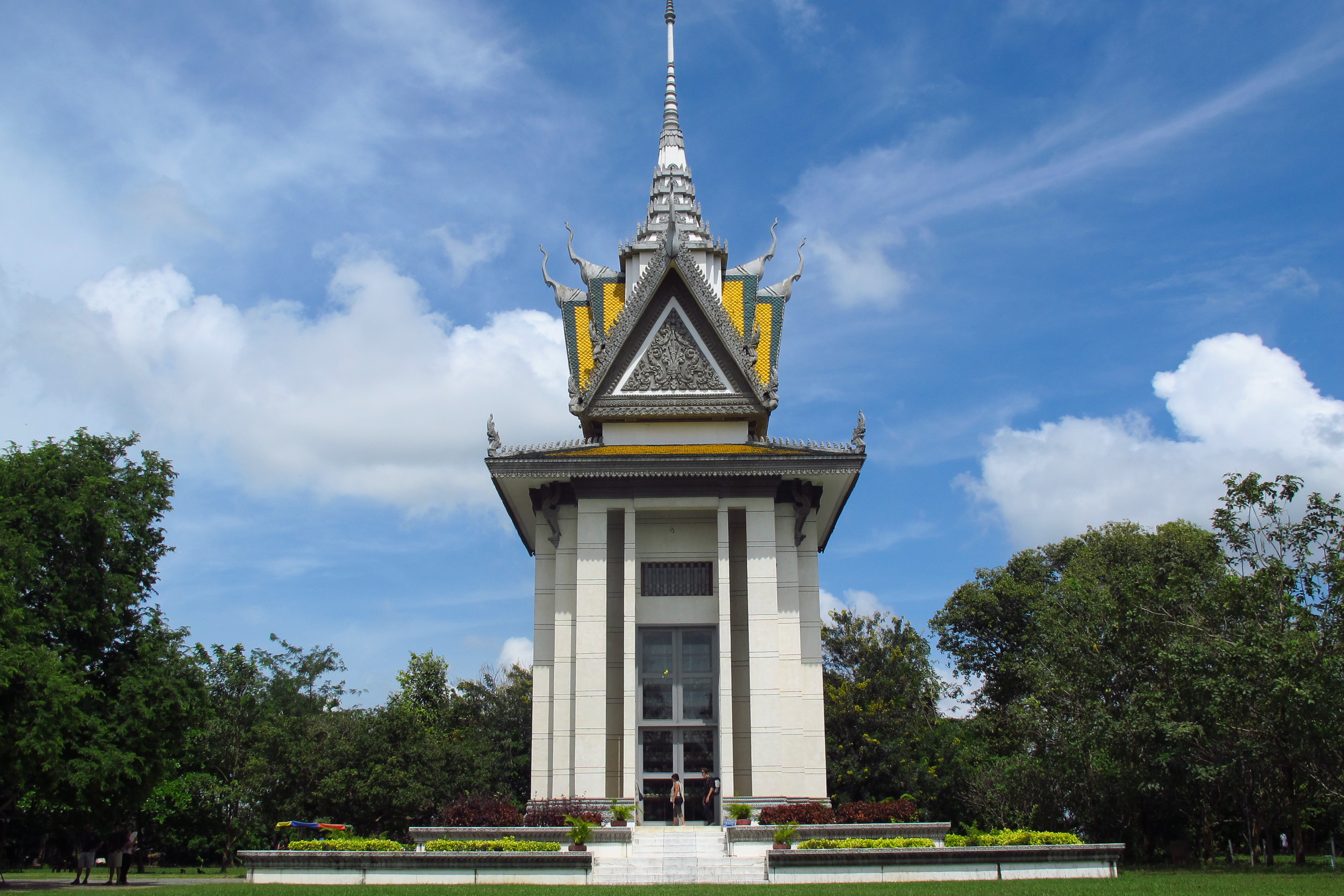
- The Buddhist Stupa at Choeung Ek
- Interactive map of Cambodian Memorial Sites
- Location: Kampong Chhnang Province and Phnom Penh in Cambodia
- Includes: 1. The Former M-13 Prison; 2. Tuol Sleng Genocide Museum; 3. Choeung Ek Genocidal Center

UNESCO World Heritage Site
- Criteria: Cultural: vi
- Reference: 1748
- Inscription: 2025 (47th Session)

The Cambodian Memorial Sites: From centres of repression to places of peace and reflection is a UNESCO World Heritage Site which consists of the former M-13 prison (early repression), the Tuol Sleng Genocide Museum (former S-21 prison) and the Choeung Ek Genocidal Center (former execution site of S-21). These sites have been preserved and memorialized since the fall of the Khmer Rouge regime. They stand as testimony to the horrors carried out by the communist Khmer Rouge from 1975 to 1979. Formerly sites of mass detention, torture, and execution, these locations have been transformed into profound spaces of remembrance and learning. Today, they serve as solemn memorials to one of the 20th century’s most tragic genocides and offer opportunities for reflection, healing, and the pursuit of peace. UNESCO’s recognition of these memorials represents a significant step in safeguarding Cambodia’s painful history, paying tribute to the resilience of its people, and raising global awareness about the devastating impact of totalitarianism and mass violence.

== History ==
Between 1975 and 1979, Cambodia came under the rule of the Khmer Rouge, a radical Maoist regime led by Pol Pot. Driven by a vision of creating a classless, agrarian society, the regime launched a ruthless campaign of social reengineering that resulted in the deaths of an estimated 1.7 to 2 million people—nearly a quarter of the nation’s population.

The Khmer Rouge sought to dismantle all aspects of traditional society, including money, private property, religion, and education. Cities were emptied, and entire populations were forcibly relocated to rural labor camps. Intellectuals, professionals, religious figures, and even children suspected of disloyalty were detained, tortured, and executed. A vast network of prisons and killing fields became tools of systematic repression and state-sponsored terror.

One of the most infamous of these sites was S-21, later known as the Tuol Sleng Genocide Museum, where thousands were tortured into giving false confessions before being executed at nearby killing fields like Choeung Ek. Other sites, such as M-13 Prison, were instrumental in the regime’s early consolidation of power and served as models for future detention centers.

These locations stand as stark evidence of the Khmer Rouge’s brutal control and reveal the inner workings of a regime fueled by ideology and fear. After the regime’s fall in 1979, survivors and local communities took steps to preserve these sites—not only as places of remembrance and education, but also as enduring warnings of the dangers posed by extremism, authoritarianism, and dehumanization.

== Sites ==
=== The Former M-13 Prison ===
The Former M-13 Prison (Khmer: អតីតមន្ទីរឃុំឃាំង ម-១៣) currently located in Prey Chrov village, Kbal Tuek commune, Tuek Phos district, Kampong Chhnang province bordering Thma Kob Village, Amleang Commune, Thpong District, Kampong Speu province. Situated in a rural part of central Kampong Chhnang province, it was once one of the most significant prisons during the early Khmer Rouge era, but today it remains merely a neglected and overgrown plot of land. As of February 25, 2025, this location has been officially designated as a protected site by the Ministry of Culture and Fine Arts and is now recognized as a UNESCO World Heritage Site.

=== Tuol Sleng Genocide Museum ===
Tuol Sleng Genocide Museum (former S-21 prison) (Khmer: សារមន្ទីរឧក្រិដ្ឋកម្មប្រល័យពូជសាសន៍ទួលស្លែង (មន្ទីរស-២១)) is a museum dedicated to documenting and preserving the history of the Cambodian genocide. Situated in Boeng Keng Kang, Phnom Penh, the site was originally a secondary school before being repurposed by the Khmer Rouge regime as Security Prison 21 from 1975 until the regime's collapse in 1979. Between 1976 and 1979, approximately 20,000 individuals were detained at Tuol Sleng, which became one of an estimated 150 to 196 torture and execution centers operated by the Khmer Rouge and its secret police.

=== Choeung Ek Genocidal Center ===
Choeung Ek Genocidal Center (Khmer: មជ្ឈមណ្ឌលប្រល័យពូជសាសន៍ជើងឯក) is located in Dangkao, Phnom Penh. This site became one of the Khmer Rouge’s notorious Killing Fields between 1975 and 1979, used in carrying out the Cambodian genocide. Located about 17 kilometers (11 miles) south of the city center, it was closely linked to the Tuol Sleng detention center. After the regime’s collapse, the remains of 8,895 victims were exhumed from mass graves—many of whom were executed using crude tools like pickaxes to save bullets.

== UNESCO Inscription ==
On July 11, 2025, the Cambodian Memorial Sites: From centres of repression to places of peace and reflection were officially inscribed on the UNESCO World Heritage List during the 47th session of the World Heritage Committee. This landmark recognition marks Cambodia’s fifth World Heritage Site and the first to specifically honor the country’s modern history of genocide and political repression.

These locations were designated under UNESCO Criterion (vi) for their profound testimony to recent historical events and their universal value as spaces for memory, education, and reflection. The nomination reflected Cambodia’s strong national commitment to preserving the physical remnants of the Khmer Rouge era and advancing peace through remembrance.

In its assessment, UNESCO highlighted the powerful transformation of these former sites of systemic violence into educational and commemorative landmarks. Their inclusion on the World Heritage List underscores their significance not only in Cambodian history but also in the broader context of global heritage. They stand as lasting symbols of the Cambodian people’s resilience and as stark reminders of the consequences of totalitarianism, genocide, and state-sponsored violence.

The inscription also emphasizes the global importance of post-conflict memorialization and reconciliation, aligning with broader international efforts to protect sites that encourage healing, promote historical understanding, and ensure that such atrocities are never repeated.

Location of Cambodia Memorial Sites

Site Name	Location	Picture
The Former M-13 Prison	Tuek Phos, Kampong Chhnang province	
Tuol Sleng Genocide Museum	Boeng Keng Kang, Phnom Penh	
Choeung Ek Genocidal Center	Dangkao, Phnom Penh	
