= Khan Pou Senchey =

Pou Senchey ខណ្ឌពោធិ៍សែនជ័យ
- District (Khan)
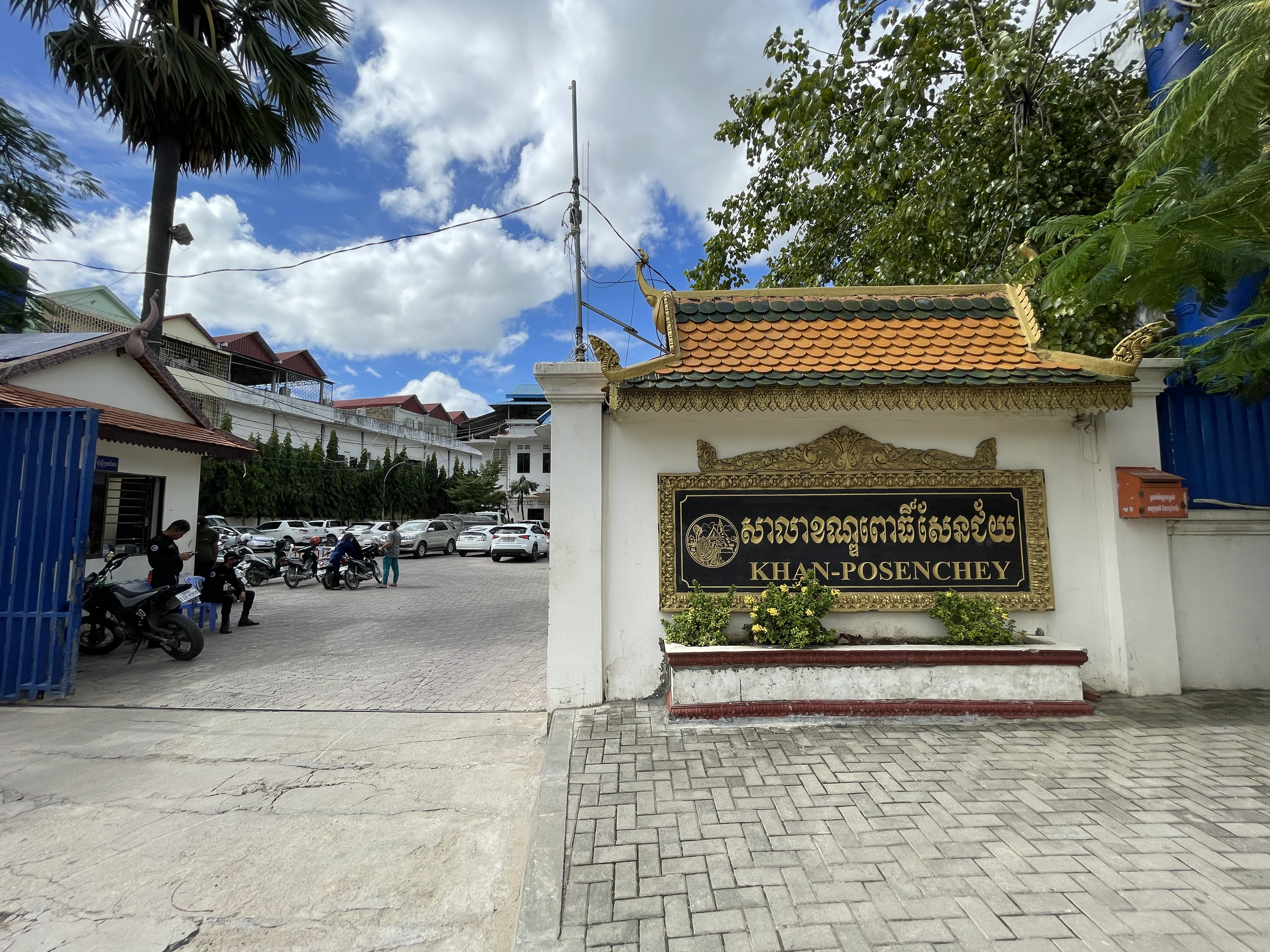
- Pou Senchey District Hall

- Location within Cambodia
- Coordinates: 11°32′27″N 104°49′59″E
- Country: Cambodia
- Province: Phnom Penh

Area
  - Total: 60.6 km^{2} (23.4 sq mi)

Population (2019)
  - Total: 226,971
- Time zone: UTC+7 (ICT)
- Geocode: 1209

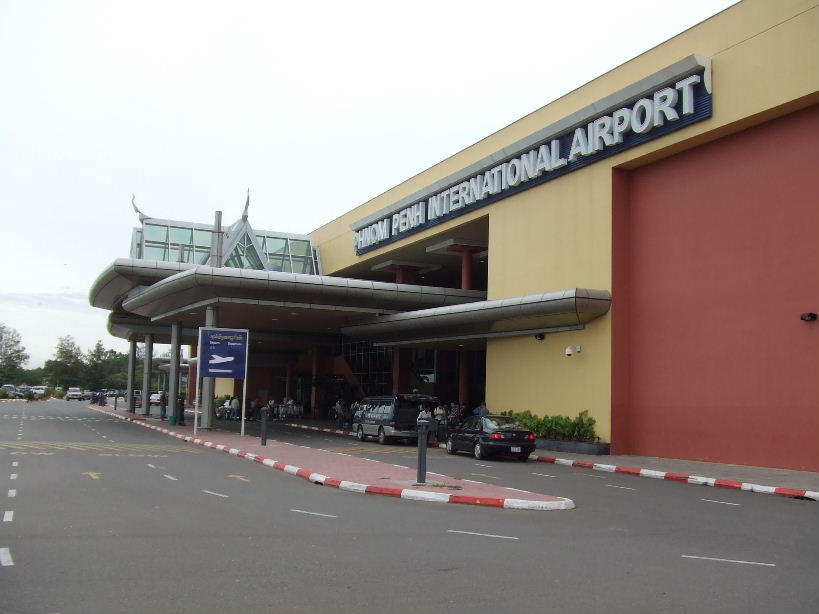
Phnom penh International Airport is in Khan Pou Senchey

Pou Senchey (Khmer: ខណ្ឌពោធិ៍សែនជ័យ) is an administrative district (khan) of Phnom Penh, Cambodia.

Phnom Penh International Airport is in Pou Senchey District.

== Administration ==
Khan Pou Senchey was established in 2011 by taking the following 13 Sangkats from Khan Dangkao: Trapeang Krasang, Kouk Roka, Phleung Chheh Roteh, Chaom Chau, Kakab, Samraong Kraom, Krang Thnong, Boeng Thum, Kamboul, Kantaok, Ovlaok, Ponsang and Snaor.

In 2013, Kouk Roka and Ponsang formed a part of a new entity, Khan Prek Pnov, while Krang Thnong was moved to Khan Sen Sok. In 2016, Chaom Chau was split in three separate Sangkats and Kakab was split in two parts.

On 8 January 2019, according to sub-decree 04 អនក្រ.បក, 6 Sangkats from Khan Pou Senchey were moved to a new khan, Khan Kamboul; the Sangkats involved were Kamboul, Kantaok, Ovlaok, Snaor, Phleung Chheh Roteh and Boeng Thum.

As of 2020, Pou Senchey is subdivided into seven Sangkats (communes) and 75 Phums (villages).

Geocode	Sangkat (commune)	Phums (villages)
120901	Trapeang Krasang	Aksar, Krang, Trapeang Andoung, Prey Doun Sok, Trapeang Tea, Trapeang Anhchanh, Chongruk, Veal, Khvaeng, Trapeang Krasang, Samaki1, Samaki2, Samaki3
120906	Samraong Kraom	Chamkar Sbaeng, Trapeang Thong, Kouk Prich, Tekkhabpanhnhao, Samraong, Chaeng Maeng, Chak Chruk, Ak Rumduol, Srae Rachcheak, Andoung Ta An, Prey Popel
120914	Chaom Chau 1	Kouk Chambak, Tuol Pongro, Trapeang Rumchek, Chaom Chau 1, Trapeang Thloeng 1, Trapeang Thloeng 2, Trapeang Thloeng 3, Trapeang Thloeng 4
120915	Chaom Chau 2	Thma Koul 1, Thma Koul 2, Thma Koul 3, Chaom Chau 2, Chaom Chau 3, Chrey Kaong, Lvea, Prey Lngor, Prey Spueu, Prey Kambot, Damnak Trayueng, Srae Chumrov, Kab Kang, Krang Doun Tey, Prey Sandaek, Prey Pring Khang Tboung 1
120916	Chaom Chau 3	Prey Tea 1, Prey Tea 2, Prey Chi Sak, Trapeang Pou, Prey Pring Khang Cheung 1, Prey Pring Khang Cheung 2, Prey Pring Khang Tboung 2, Thnal Bambaek, Chumpu Voan 1, Chumpu Voan 2, Prey Svay, Ang Keo, Ang, Oudem
120917	Kakab 1	Kbal Damrei 1, Chamkar Ovloek 1, Ta Nguon 1, Ta Nguon 2, Paprak Khang Tbong, Trapeang Lvea 1, Trapeang Lvea 2, Paprak Khang Cheung
120918	Kakab 2	Kbal Damrei 2, Chamkar Ovloek 2, Prey Sala, Kakab, Trapeang Chrey
