= Royal University =

Royal University may refer to:

- Pontifical and Royal University of Santo Tomas, Philippines
- Royal University of Agriculture
- Royal University of Bhutan
- Royal University of Fine Arts
- Royal University of Ireland
- Royal University of Law and Economics
- Royal University of Phnom Penh
- Sapienza University of Rome, called the Reale Università degli studi di Roma between 1870 and 1935, when it was transferred from papal governance to the Kingdom of Italy
