= Khan Kamboul =

Khan (district) in Phnom Penh, Cambodia

Kamboul ខណ្ឌកំបូល
- District (Khan)
- Location of Kamboul within Phnom Penh

- Location within Cambodia
- Coordinates: 11°31′43″N 104°46′47″E
- Country: Cambodia
- Provinces: Phnom Penh

Area
  - Total: 96.2 km^{2} (37.1 sq mi)

Population (2019)
  - Total: 75,529
- Time zone: UTC+7 (ICT)
- Geocode: 1206

Kamboul (Khmer: ខណ្ឌកំបូល) is a district (khan) located in western Phnom Penh, Cambodia. It was formerly a part of Kandal Province before being integrated into Phnom Penh. This khan was created on January 8, 2019, according to sub-decree 04 អនក្រ.បក by taking 6 sangkats from Khan Pou Senchey, and 1 sangkat (Sangkat Prateah Lang) from Khan Dangkao. It has a population of 75,529.

== Administration ==
As of 2019, Khan Kamboul has 7 sangkats and 93 phums (villages).

No.	Code	Sangkat	Khmer	Number of villages
1	121401	Kamboul	កំបូល	18
2	121402	Kantouk	កន្ទោក	13
3	121403	Ovlaok	ឪឡោក	14
4	121404	Snaor	ស្នោរ	18
5	121405	Phleung Chheh Roteh	ភ្លើងឆេះរទេះ	8
6	121406	Boeng Thum	បឹងធំ	16
7	121407	Prateah Lang	ប្រទះឡាង	6
Total				93

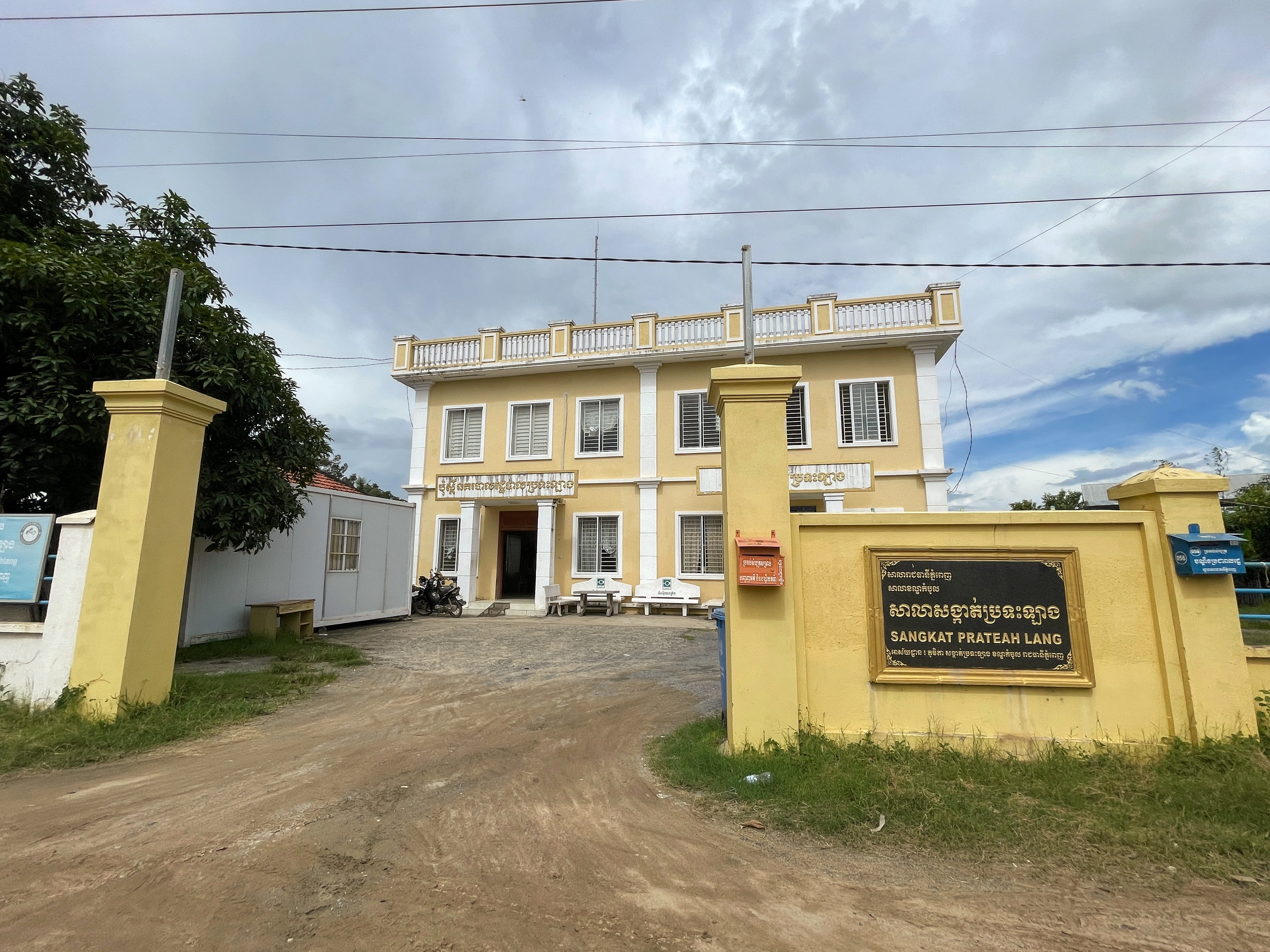
PRATEAH LANG Commune Hall

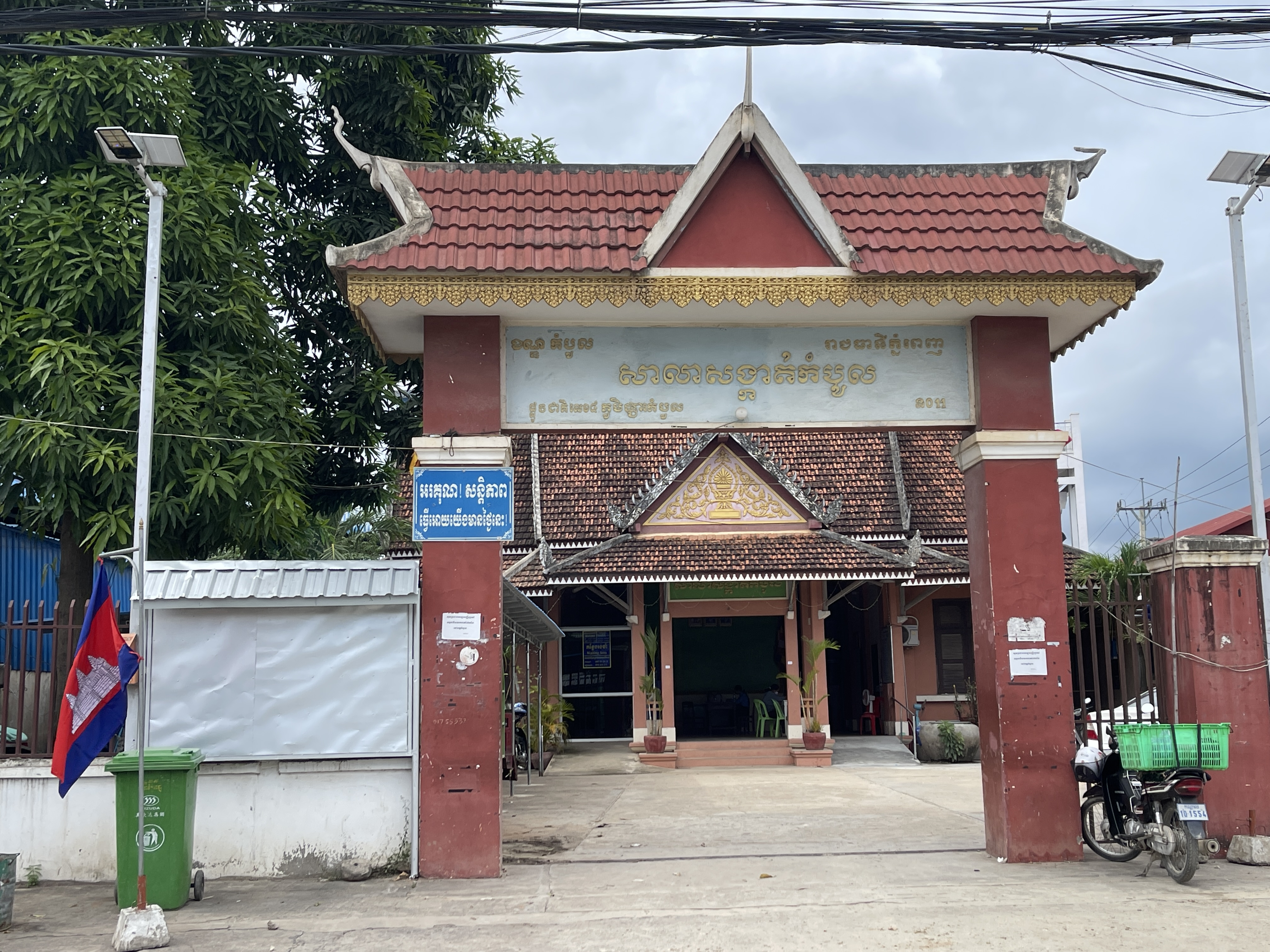
Kamboul Commune Hall

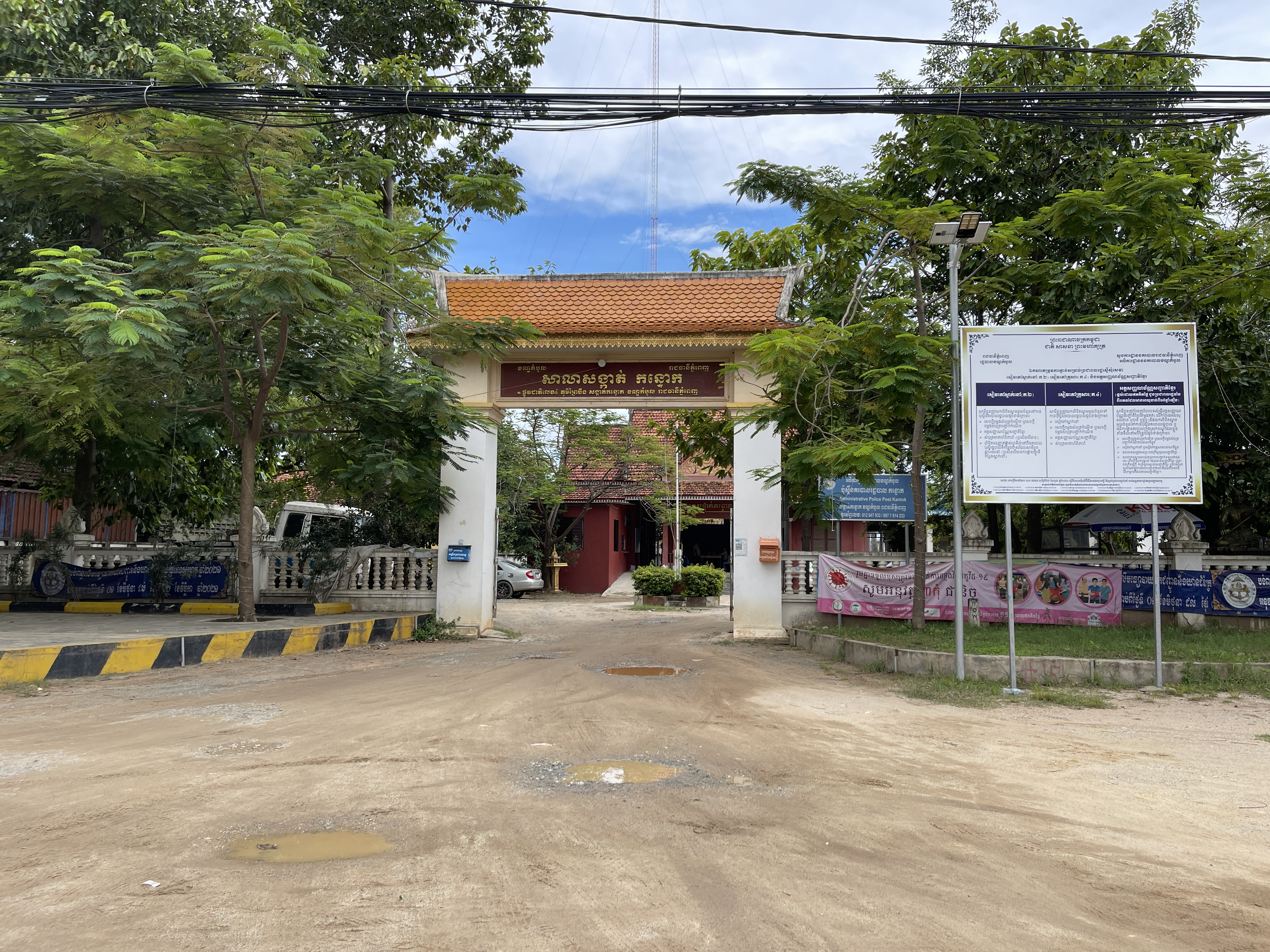
Kantouk Commune Hall

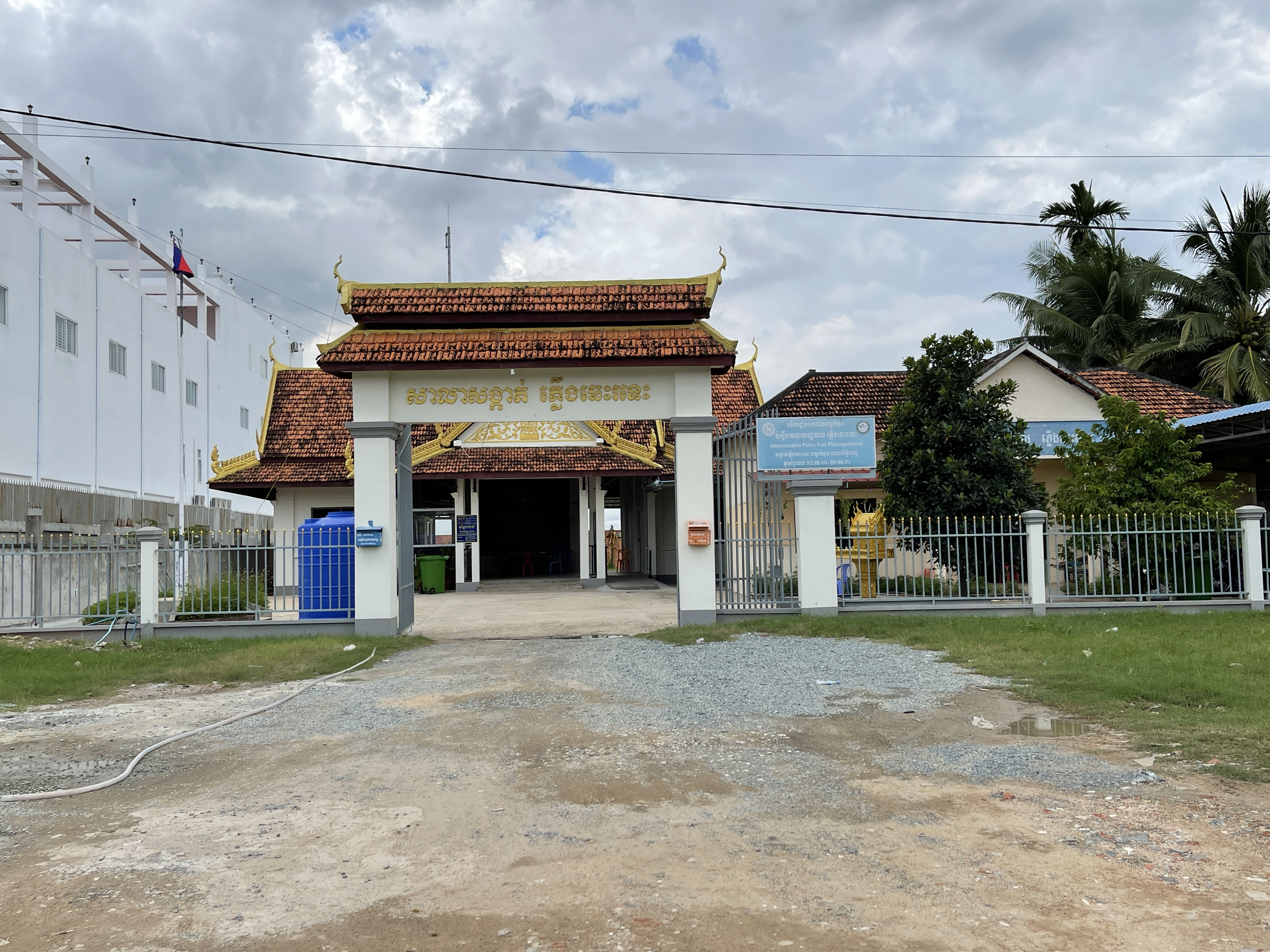
Phleung Chheh Roteh Commune Hall

== Landmarks ==
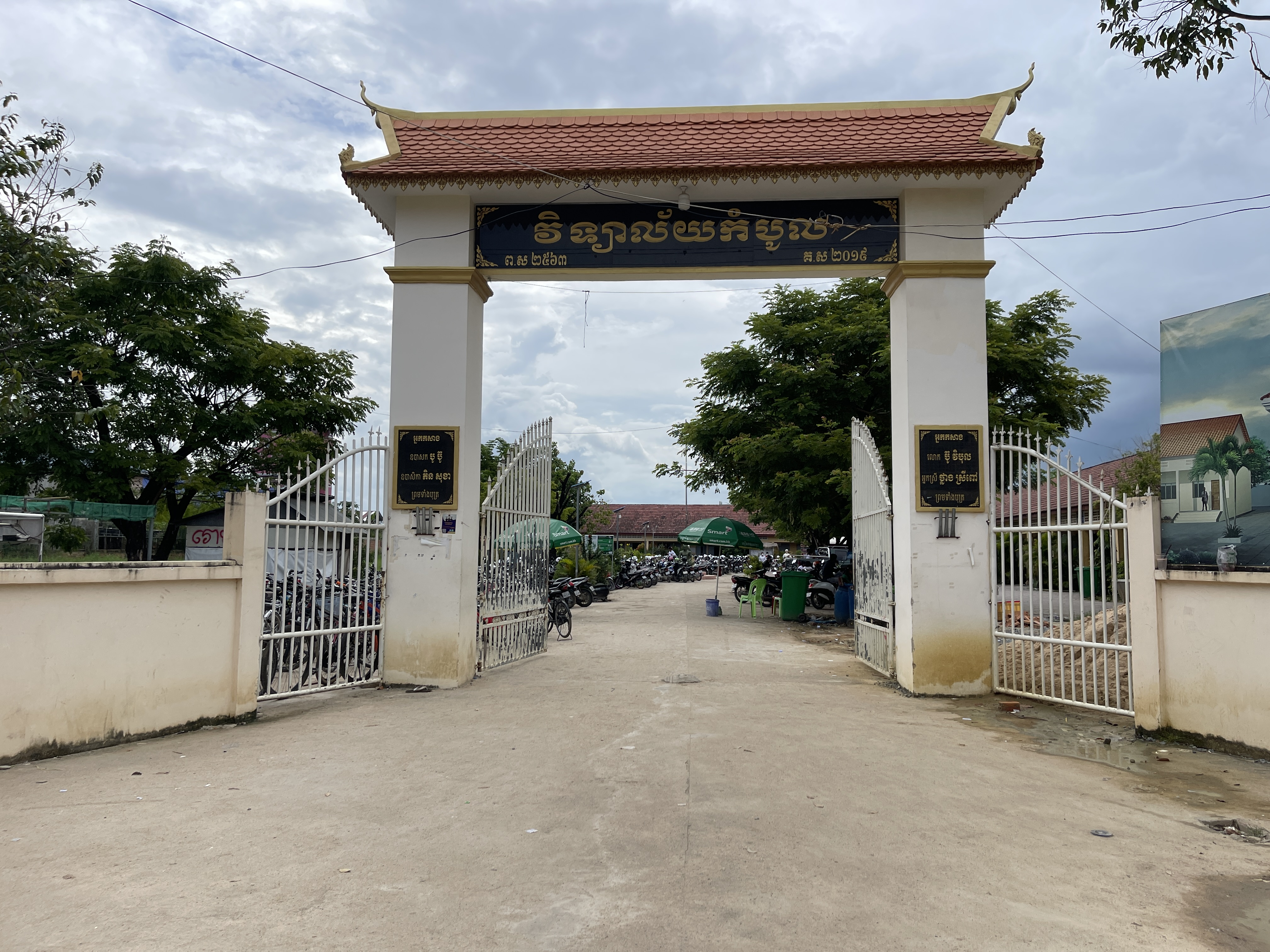
Kamboul High School

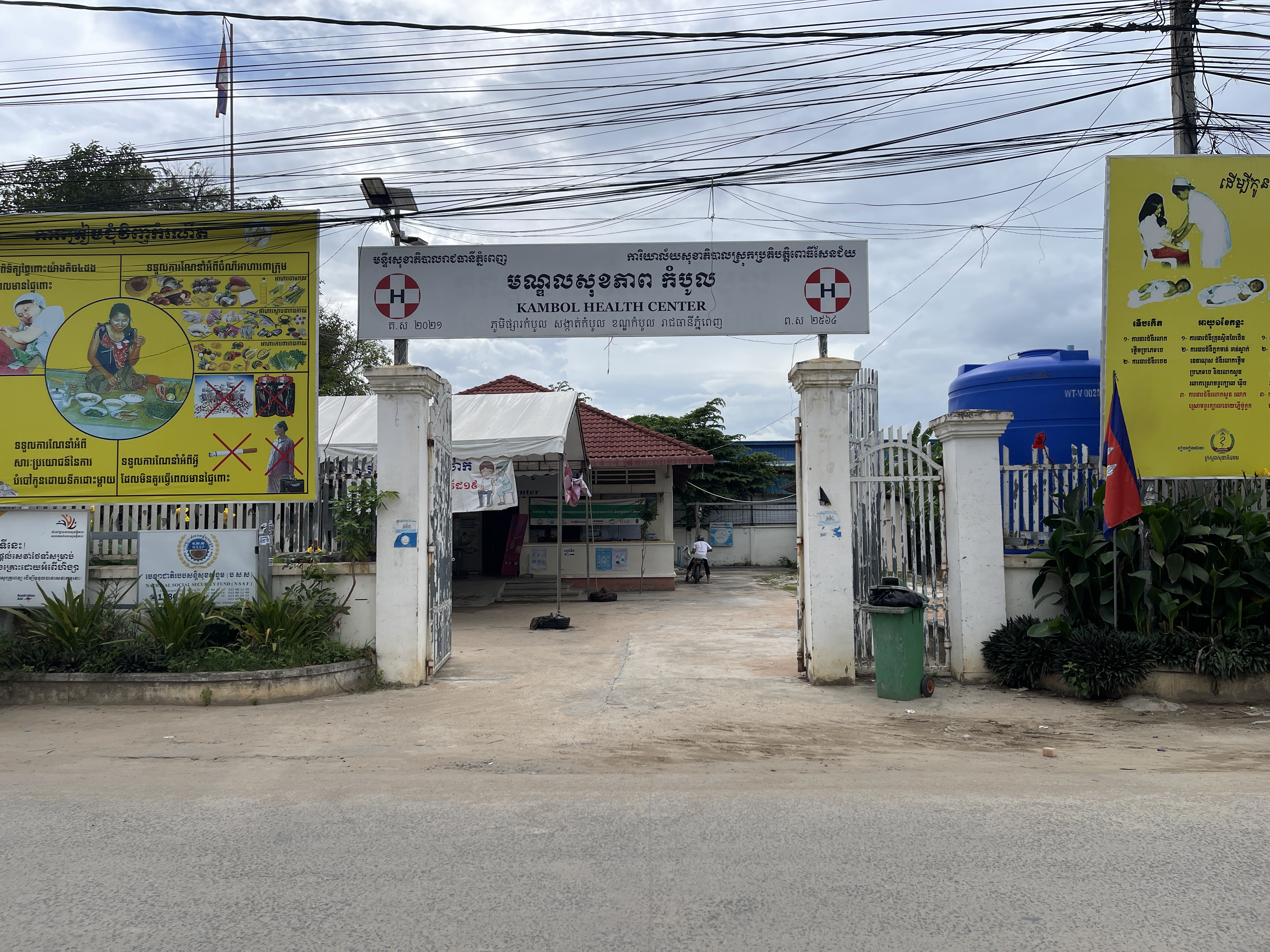
Kamboul Health Center
