= Royal University of Agriculture =

Agricultural school in Phnom Penh, Cambodia

Coordinates: 50°38′27″N 05°34′29″E

- សាកលវិទ្យាល័យភូមិន្ទកសិកម្ម (Khmer); Université royale d'agriculture (French)
- Type: National
- Established: 7 December 1964; 61 years ago
- Rector: Prof. Dr. Ngo Bunthan
- Head: Khmer
- Academic staff: 480
- Students: 9,527
- Location: PO Box 2696, Dangkor District, Phnom Penh, Cambodia
- Campus: Phnom Penh
- Mascot: Agence Universitaire de la Francophonie; Association of Southeast Asian Institutions of Higher Learning; Ministry of Agriculture, Forestry and Fisheries
- Website: rua.edu.kh

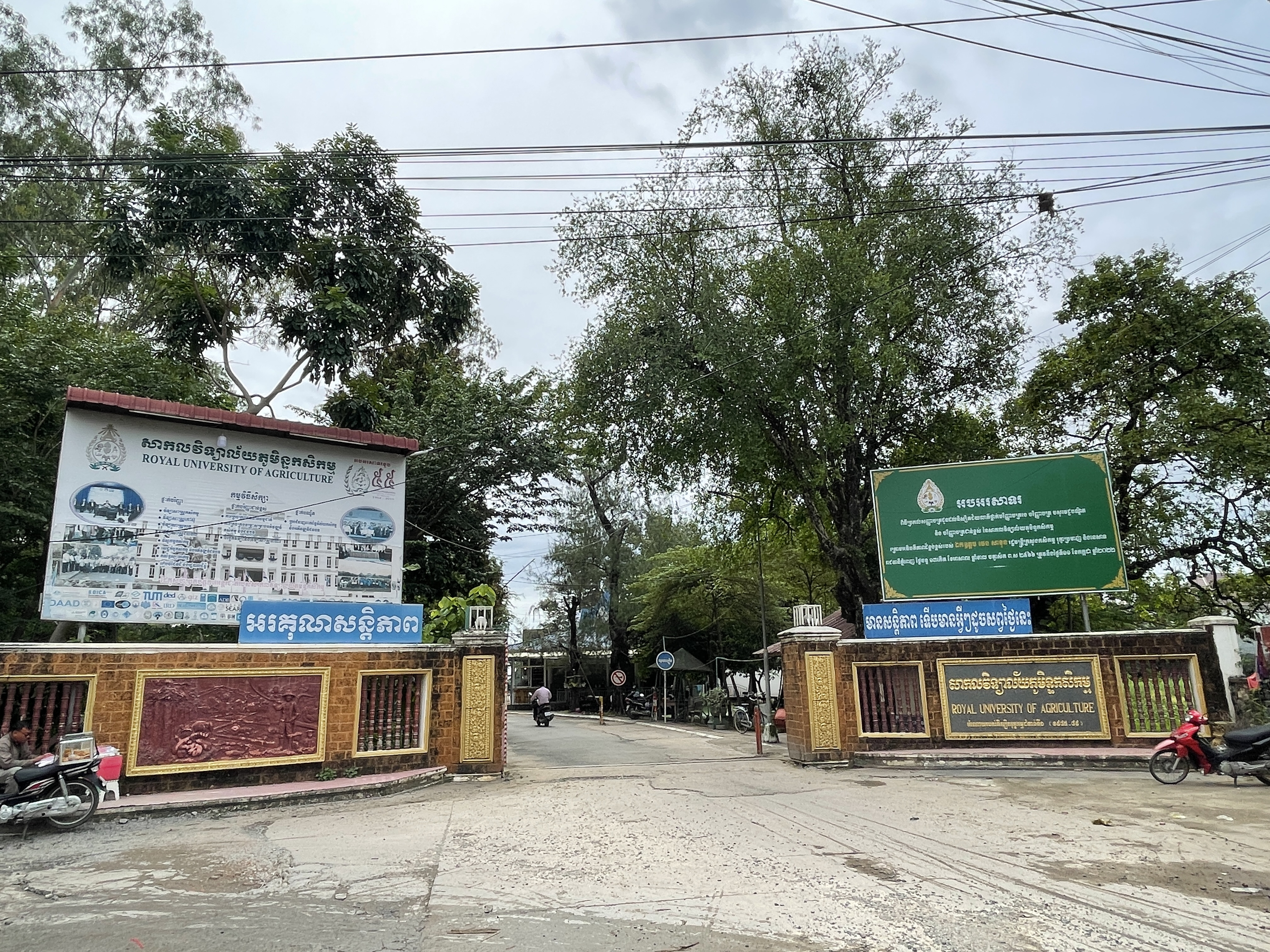
Royal University of Agriculture

The Royal University of Agriculture (RUA) is a leading public agricultural university in Cambodia. It is located in Dangkao Section, southwest Phnom Penh. The university is operated by the Ministry of Agriculture, Forestry and Fisheries.

== History ==
In 1964, the Royal University of Agronomy Science (Khmer: សាកលវិទ្យាល័យភូមិន្ទវិទ្យាសាស្ត្រកសិកម្ម; French: Université Royale des Sciences Agronomiques) was founded by then Prince Norodom Sihanouk. It was one of the nine royal universities established to improve Cambodian higher education development. It was entirely closed during the Khmer Rouge from 1975 to 1979.

In 1980, it was reopened with the new name of Institute of Agricultural Education (Khmer: វិទ្យាស្ថានអប់រំកសិកម្ម) to educate government staff to work in fields such as forestry, animal production, veterinary medicine, crop production, and agricultural machinery. In 1984, it became known as Institute of Agricultural Technology (Khmer: វិទ្យាស្ថានបច្ចេកវិទ្យាកសិកម្ម). It offered bachelor's degrees in Agronomy, Animal Science and Veterinary Medicine, Agricultural Engineering, Forestry and Fishery. Obtaining assistance from abroad, professors were from Soviet Union so all lectures were taught in Russian. In 1990, the support from the Soviet Union ended so the curriculum was converted to Khmer language.

In 1994, it officially changed the name to Royal University of Agriculture. After that, other bachelor's degree programs were introduced. In 2002, graduate degree programs in agricultural science-related majors were launched.

RUA is accredited by the Ministry of Agriculture, Forestry and Fisheries, and Ministry of Education, Youth and Sport. RUA offers bachelor's, masters and doctorate degrees. It is a leading contributor to Cambodia's human resources in the fields of agriculture and rural development.

== Academics ==
The Royal University of Agriculture comprises nine faculties, a school, and four research centers:

- Department of Foundation Year
- Faculty of Agronomy
- Faculty of Animal Science
- Faculty of Veterinary Medicine
- Faculty of Forestry
- Faculty of Fisheries
- Faculty of Agricultural Engineering
- Faculty of Agricultural Economics and Rural Development
- Faculty of Agro-Industry
- Faculty of Land Management and Land Administration
- Faculty of Rubber Sciences
- Graduate School
- Hun Sen Research Center
- IT Centre
- Language Centre
- Center for Sustainable Agriculture
- Center for Agricultural and Environmental Studies
- Center for Livestock Development Studies
- Ecosystem Services and Land Use (ECOLAND) research center

== See also ==
- Agriculture in Cambodia
- Education in Cambodia
- Ministry of Agriculture, Forestry and Fisheries, Cambodia
