= Choeung Ek =

Killing field and mass grave in Cambodia

- ជើងឯក
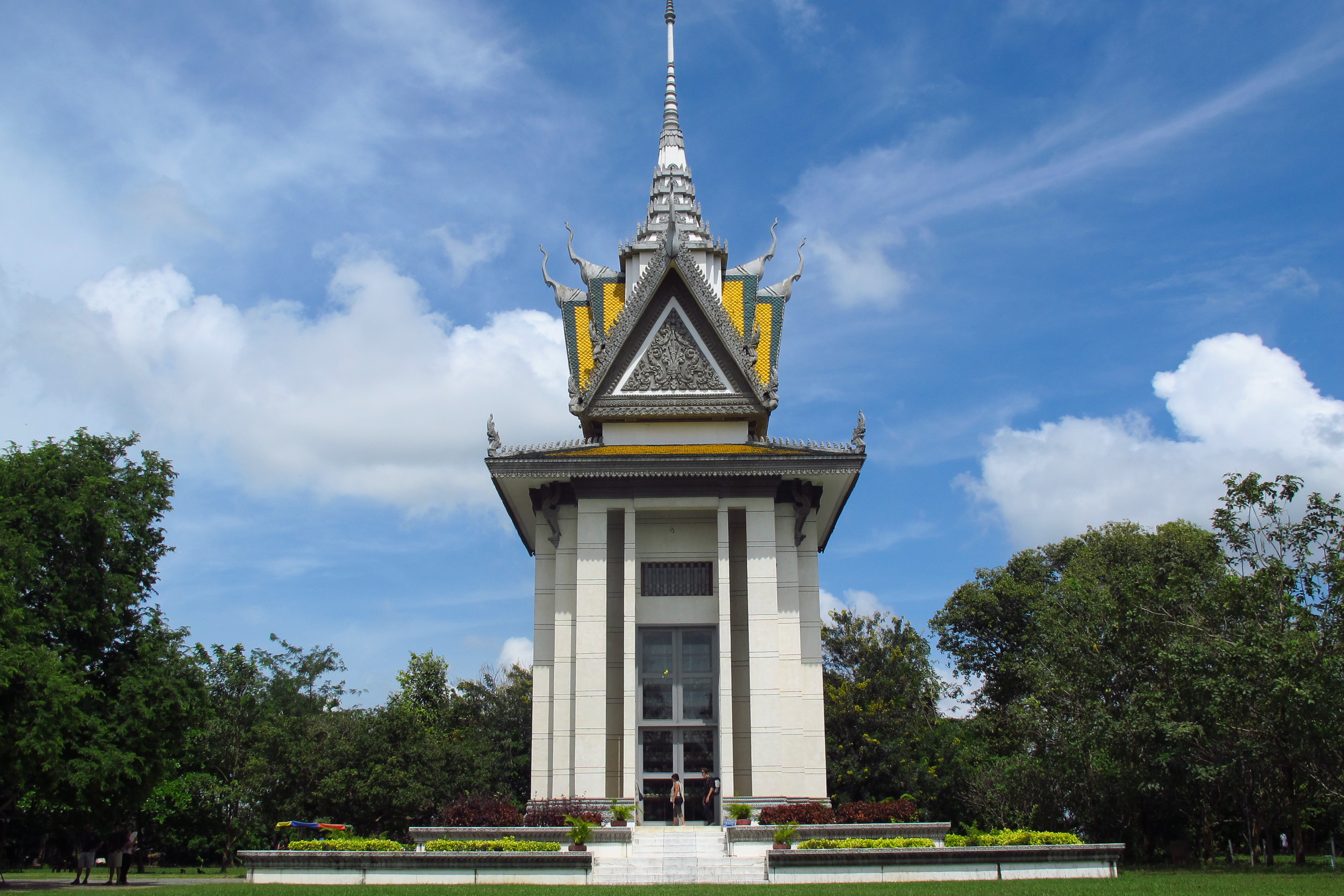
- Choeung Ek stupa in 2012
- Interactive map of Choeung Ek
- Location: Phnom Penh, Cambodia
- Coordinates: 11°29′4″N 104°54′7″E
- Type: Buddhist stupa
- Height: 62 m (203 ft)
- Beginning date: 1988

UNESCO World Heritage Site
- Part of: Cambodian Memorial Sites: From centres of repression to places of peace and reflection
- Criteria: Cultural: vi
- Reference: 1748-003
- Inscription: 2025 (47th Session)

Choeung Ek (Khmer: ជើងឯក, Cheung Êk [cəːŋ ʔaek]) is a site in Dangkao on the outskirts of Phnom Penh, capital of Cambodia, that was used as a Killing Field between 1977 and 1979 by the Khmer Rouge to perpetrate the Cambodian genocide.

A former orchard situated about 17 kilometres (11 mi) south of the city centre, it was attached to the Tuol Sleng detention centre. The bodies of 8,895 victims were exhumed from the site after the fall of the Rouge, who would have been executed there—typically with pickaxes to conserve bullets—before being buried in mass graves. It is the best-known of the approximately 300 Killing Fields, where the Khmer Rouge regime collectively executed over one million people as part of their Cambodian genocide between 1975 and 1979.

== Background ==
Between 1975 and 1979, Cambodia was ruled by the Khmer Rouge headed by Pol Pot. The Khmer Rouge sought to transform Cambodia into an agrarian socialist society, and one of their first acts was the emptying of Cambodia's cities where two million people became labourers on farms. Khmer Rouge soldiers targeted members of ethnic minorities, political opponents, and the educated among others as part of the Cambodian Genocide. As a result of poor conditions, starvation, disease and violence, around one quarter of Cambodia's population of 8 million died.

== Use by the Khmer Rouge ==
Map of the camp at Choeung Ek.

The majority of those killed at Choeung Ek first went through the Tuol Seng prison and detention centre (S-21). In his testimony to the Extraordinary Chambers in the Courts of Cambodia, the Khmer Rouge operator of Tuol Seng Kang Kek Iew (Comrade Duch) stated that Choeung Ek was chosen as a site to bury victims away from Tuol Seng to mitigate the risk of the corpses causing a disease outbreak. Staff at the Choeung Ek Genocidal Centre have also stated that Choeung Ek was chosen due to its distance from the city centre of Phnom Penh, the abundance of trees which provided privacy and that it was already a cemetery used by the local Chinese community during the 1960s and early 1970s. Some of the headstones from when it was a Chinese cemetery still remain. It was also used by the Chinese community as an orchard for growing corn, rice and watermelons. The Khmer Rouge actively used the site between 1977 and 1979.

The site at Choeung Ek had access to electric energy which was used to power lights to illuminate night executions, as well as to allow the guards to read and sign rosters. Loudspeakers were also hung from trees to play revolutionary Khmer Rouge music to cover up any screaming or shouting. Prisoners were often transported from Tuol Seng to Choeung Ek by trucks at night. The trucks normally carried 20 to 30 prisoners and 3 or 4 guards. The prisoners were then assembled in a small building (building number 1 on the diagram to the left) where their names were verified against an execution list. The guards then led the prisoners in small groups to ditches and pits dug earlier by workers. According to Him Huy, a former Khmer Rouge guard at Choeung Ek, the prisoners were "ordered to kneel down at the edge of the hole. Their hands were tied behind them. They were beaten on the neck with an iron ox-cart axle, sometimes with one blow, sometimes with two". When executing infants and young children of parents accused of crimes, the Khmer Rouge used a chankiri tree at Choeung Ek to bash their heads against whilst holding them by their legs. The tree is called the 'Killing Tree' and is adorned by hundreds of colourful bracelets. Women were also sometimes subject to rape before being killed. A few dozen to over 300 people were executed each day.

In 1979, a Vietnamese invasion deposed the Khmer Rouge government and led to the establishment of the Vietnamese backed People's Republic of Kampuchea (PRK). Mass graves were subsequently unearthed, first by returning villagers and then by officials.

== Victims ==
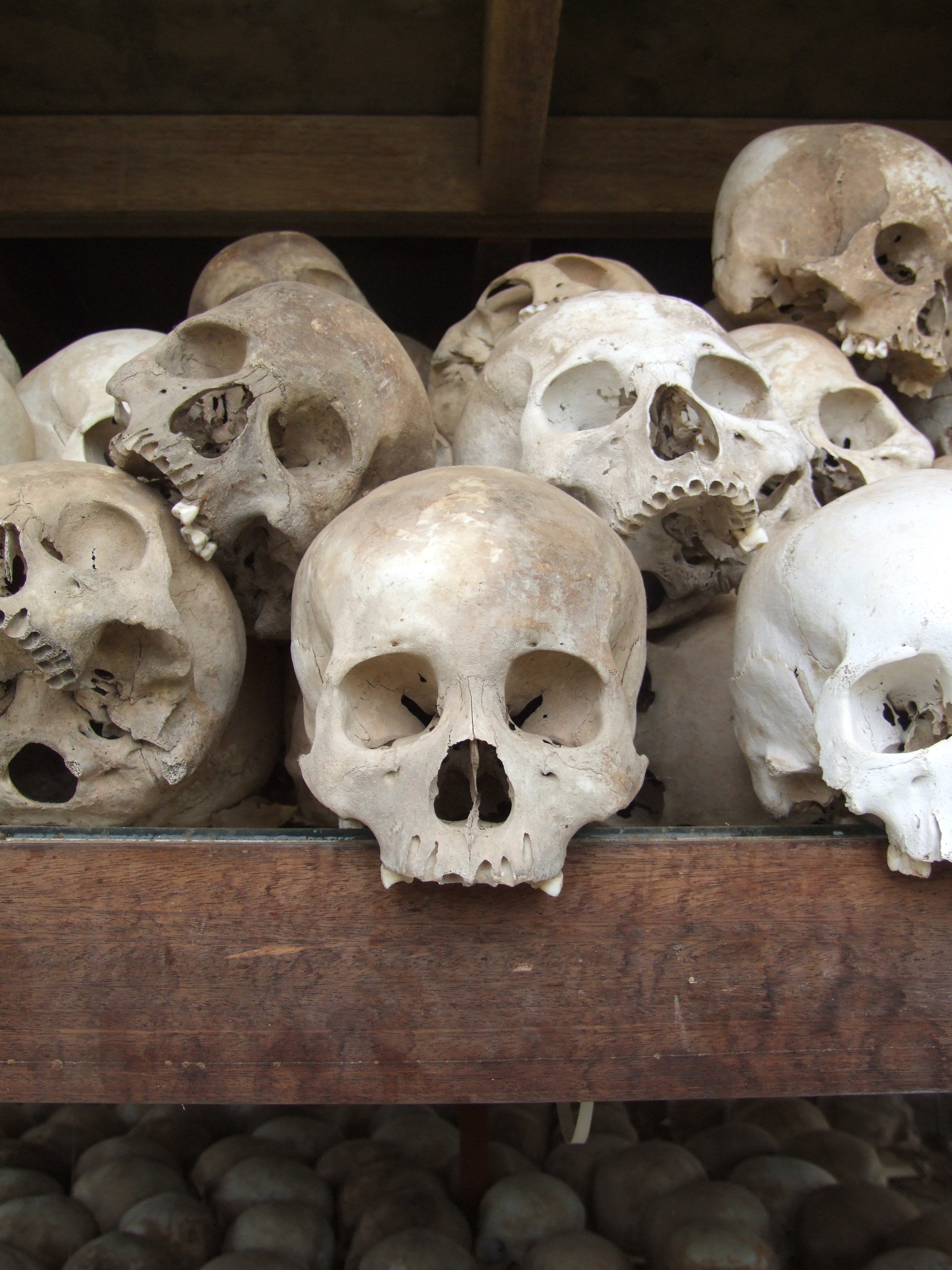
Skulls of Khmer Rouge victims stored in the stupa

Between 1977 and 1979, the Khmer Rouge is estimated to have murdered up to 20,000 people at Choeung Ek. In 1979 or 1980, officials from the Department of Culture and Information of Kandal Province documented 8,985 exhumed individuals after the Khmer Rouge was toppled. These 8,985 skeletons have been exhumed and treated with chemicals to ensure they could be preserved. A minimum of more than 7,770 people are represented by exhumed remains, although only 6,426 crania are present. At Choeung Ek, at least 129 mass graves have been discovered and of them, 86 remain untouched. The number of individuals per grave vary on average between 10 and 30, with one grave containing up to 450 people. At Grave No. 7, 166 people were buried without heads. At Grave No. 5, over 100 women and children were buried naked. After heavy rainfalls, pieces of bone and clothing can sometimes become visible.

Between 1988 and 1989, a Vietnamese team from Ho Chi Minh University headed by Professor Quang Quyen and Dr. Tran Hung was commissioned by the Phnom Penh Municipality Department of Culture to analyse crania remains. In 2012, Prime Minister Hun Sen approved a project to preserve and curate the bones, textiles and weapons at Choeung Ek - beginning the first comprehensive analysis and preservation of human remains from a Cambodian mass grave.

In 2019, an analysis of 508 crania from Choeung Ek by Julie Fleischman was published. The article investigated the demographics of victims and their traumatic injuries. Of the 508 crania analysed, the research article found that the majority of victims were male and aged between 20 and 35 years old. Women and children were also victims. A majority of crania had perimortem trauma present, with blunt force being the main mechanism of trauma while the basicranium was the most affected region. Gender and age did not seem to affect the method of execution.

== Memorial and museum ==
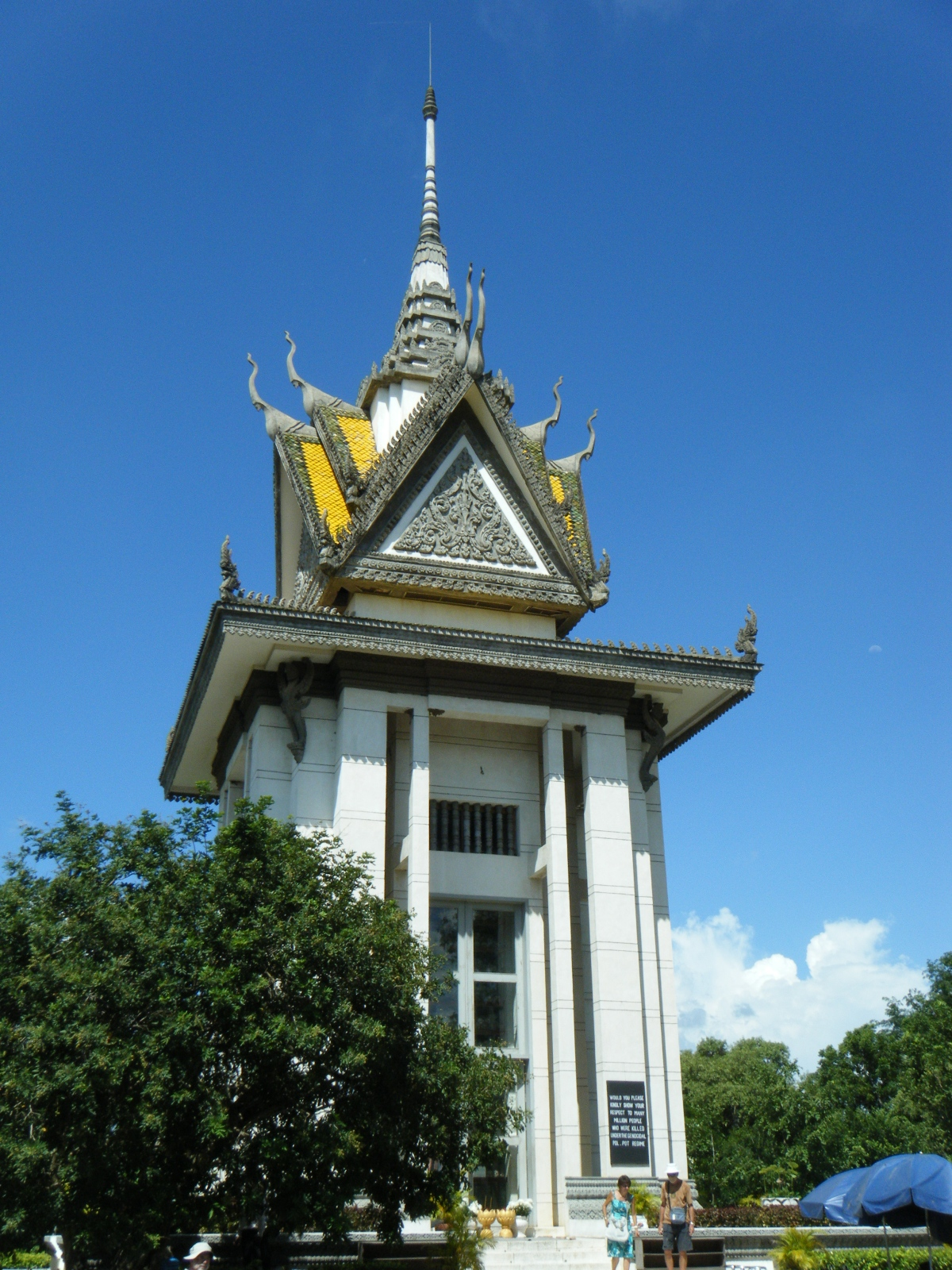
The Choeung Ek stupa, which contains the skulls of over 5,000 people murdered at the site between 1975 and 1979.

A memorial was constructed at Choeung Ek in 1988 by Cambodian authorities when the country was under the Vietnamese-backed PRK government. Its purpose as a public memorial also served to legitimise the PRK government for both the Cambodian population and international community. Development of the Choeung Ek Genocidal Center was directed by Mai Lam, who also helped create the War Remnants Museum in Ho Chi Minh City and the Tuol Seng Genocide Center.

On 3 May 2005, the Municipality of Phnom Penh announced that they had entered into a 30-year agreement with JC Royal Co. to develop the memorial at Choeung Ek. Since then, the Choeung Ek Genocidal Center has been managed by the JC Royal Company, a Japanese company also responsible for maintenance of the roads to the centre. Alongside the museum at Tuol Seng, Choeung Ek borrows elements from European and American Holocaust memorials. Choeung Ek is a popular tourist attraction in Phnom Penh. In 2007, 300 to 400 people visited the site per day during the low season which increased to 400 to 600 people per day during the high season.

In 1989, a Buddhist stupa was constructed as a memorial to the site. The Choeung Ek stupa contains a tall rectangular glass display containing over 5,000 skulls of people murdered at Choeung Ek. The stupa contains the remains of crania, mandibles, long bones, and other smaller bones who were initially housed in a wooden memorial.

According to Khmer Buddhist tradition, the spirit of a person who dies violently may linger at the site of their death rather than reincarnate. Many Cambodians therefore refuse to visit the stupa.

In 2025, the site was designated as a World Heritage Site by UNESCO as part of the Cambodian Memorial Sites.

== See also ==
- Bibliography of the Cambodian genocide
