= Khan Dangkao =

Dangkao ខណ្ឌដង្កោ
- District (Khan)
- Location of Dangkao within Phnom Penh
- Coordinates: 11°32′36.246″N 104°55′26.793″E
- Country: Cambodia
- Province: Phnom Penh

Area
  - Total: 105.1 km^{2} (40.6 sq mi)

Population (2019)
  - Total: 159,772
- Time zone: UTC+7 (ICT)

Dangkao (Khmer: ដង្កោ) is a district (khan) in the southern part of Phnom Penh, Cambodia. The district is subdivided into 13 sangkats and 83 kroms. The district has an area of 197.89 km^{2}. It has a population of 159,772.

== Administration ==
Dangkao was subdivided into 13 Sangkats and 83 villages.

On January 8, 2019, according to sub-decree 04 អនក្រ.បក, 1 sangkat (Sangkat Prateah Lang) from Khan Dangkao was moved to a new khan, Khan Kamboul.

Sangkat (communes)	Krom (villages)
Dangkao	Thmei, Barku, Sambuor, Ta Lei, Mol, Khva
Pong Tuek	Trapeang Tea, Trapeang Kor, Pong Tuek, Voat Slaeng, Srae Nhoar, Khleah Sanday, Prey Kei Ko, Prey Kei Kha, Tram Daok, Trapeang Sala
Prey Veaeng	Prey Veaeng Khang Lech, Prey Veaeng Khang Kaeut, Trapeang Chak, Trapeang Svay, Toap Baoh, Kamrieng, Roul Chruk, Serei Dei Dos, Toul Sambo
Prey Sa	Prey Thum, Prey Sa Kaeut, Prakar, Prey Sa Lech, Prey Tituy, Anlong Kong, Kouk Banteay, Thommeak Trai, Peam, Mphey Buon
Krang Pongro	Krang Svay, Krang Pongro, Tuek Thla, Prey Sampoar
Prateah Lang	Prateah Lang, Phea, Angk, Tang Roneam, Kouk Khsach, Kouk Meas
Sak Sampov	Pou Rolum, Khvet, Krang Ta Phou, Kamraeng, Sambuor, Sak Sampov, Peaream
Cheung Aek	Cheung Aek, Roluos, Srok Chek, Preaek Pranak, Preaek Thloeng
Kong Noy	Kong Noy, Veal Thlan, Serei Sambatt, Trapeang Samret
Preaek Kampues	Preaek Kampues, Preaek Roteang, Preaek Thloeng, Damnak sangkae, Srei Snam, Krang Svay
Roluos	Krapeu Troum, Preah Theat, Kandal
Spean Thma	Anhchanh, Kouk Ovloek, Meun Tra, Spean Thma, Svay Mean Leak, Phum Ha, Doung, Preaek Chrey
Tien	Krang Krouch, Thmei, Thma, Kantuy Tuek, Sala, Krang

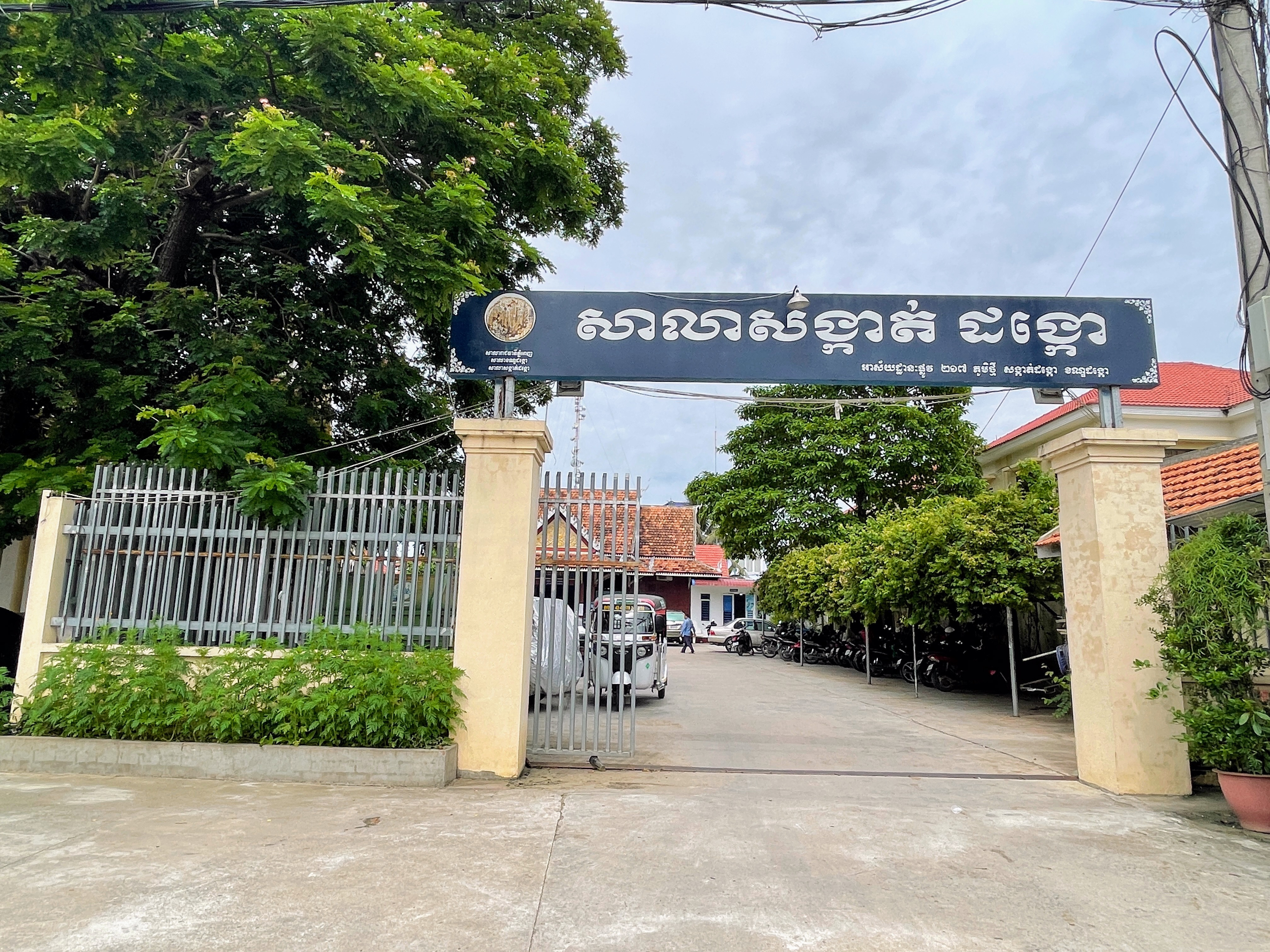
Dangkao Commune Hall On Street 217

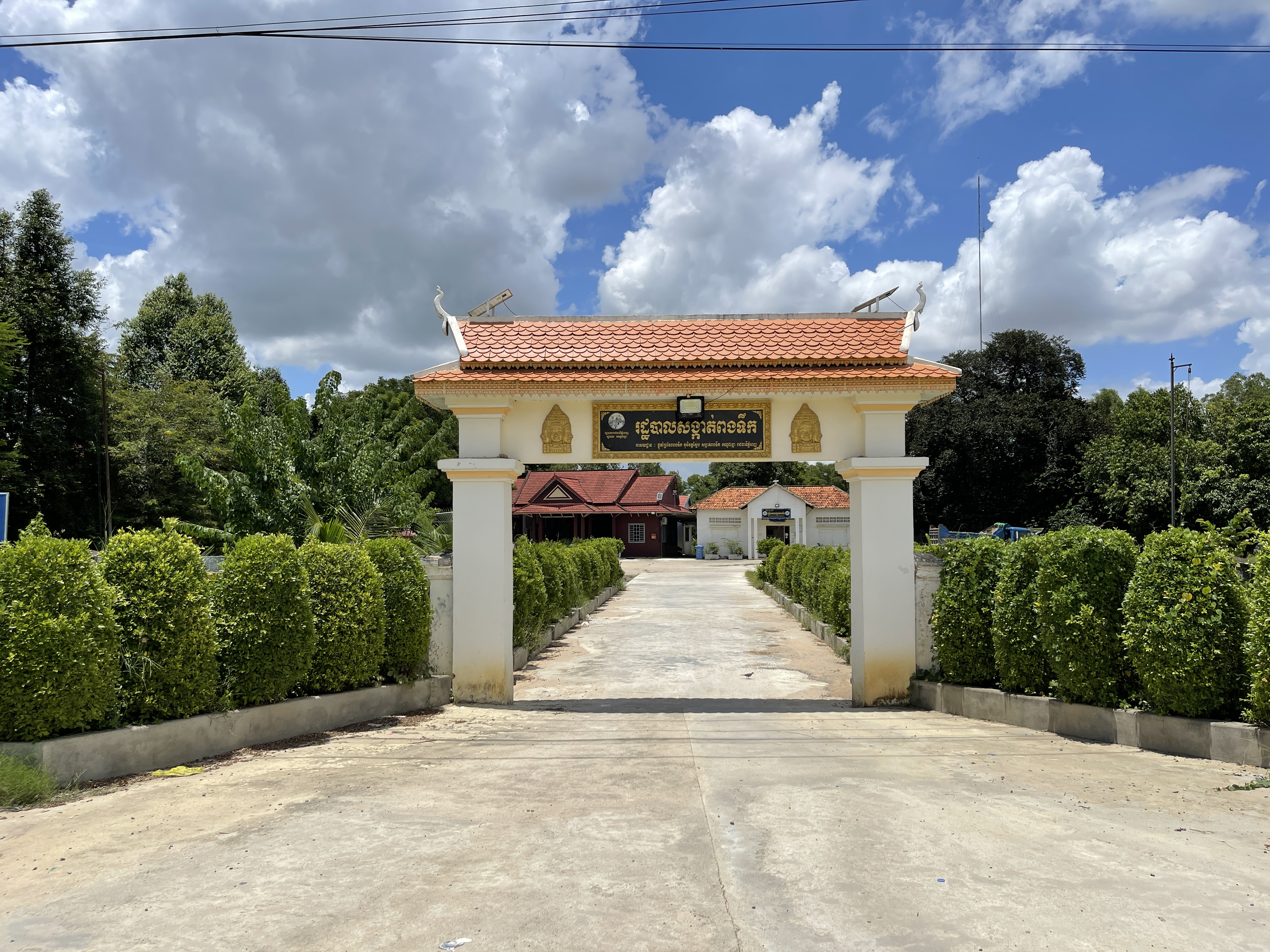
Pong Tuek Commune Office

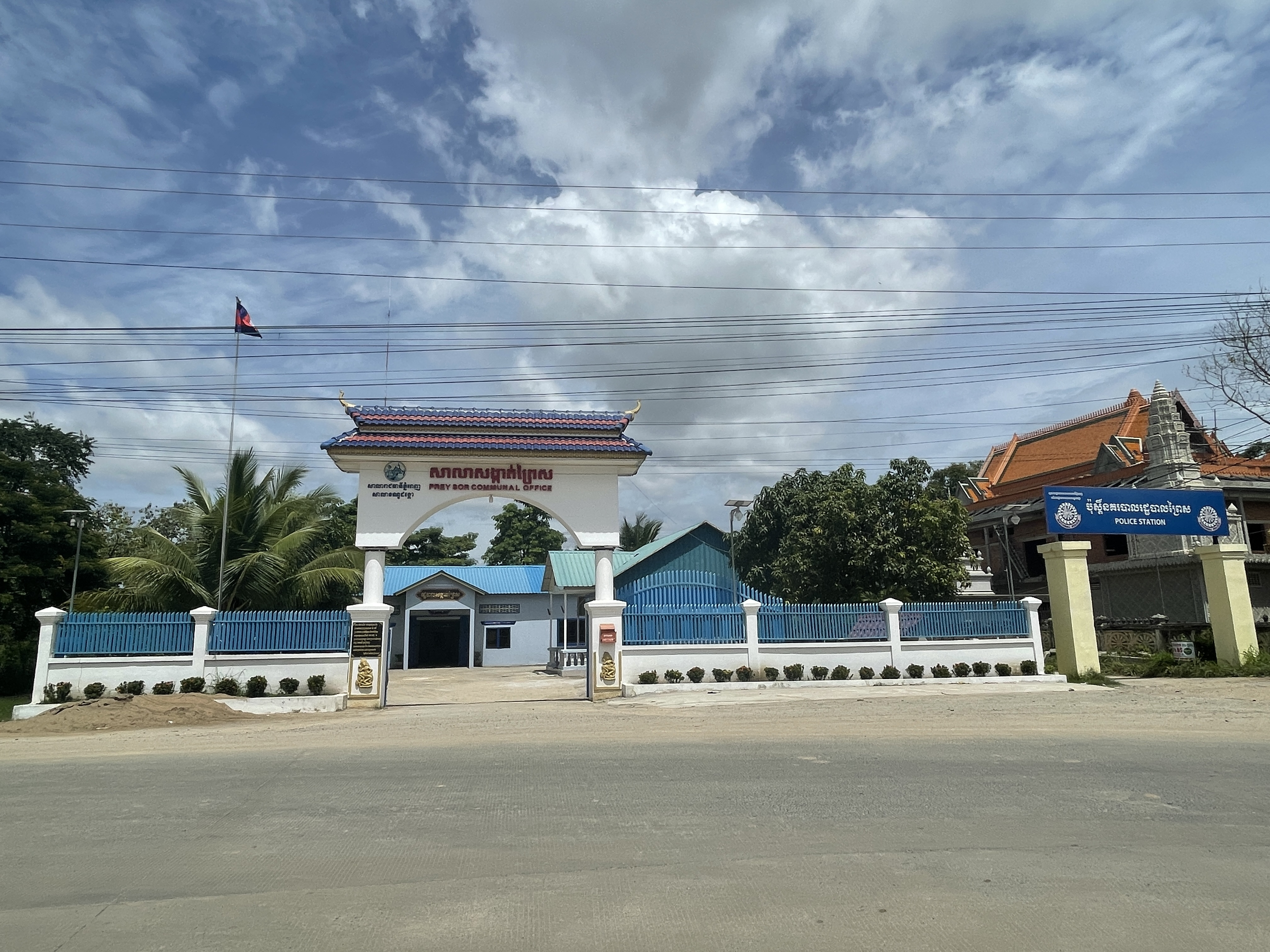
Prey Sor Commune Hall

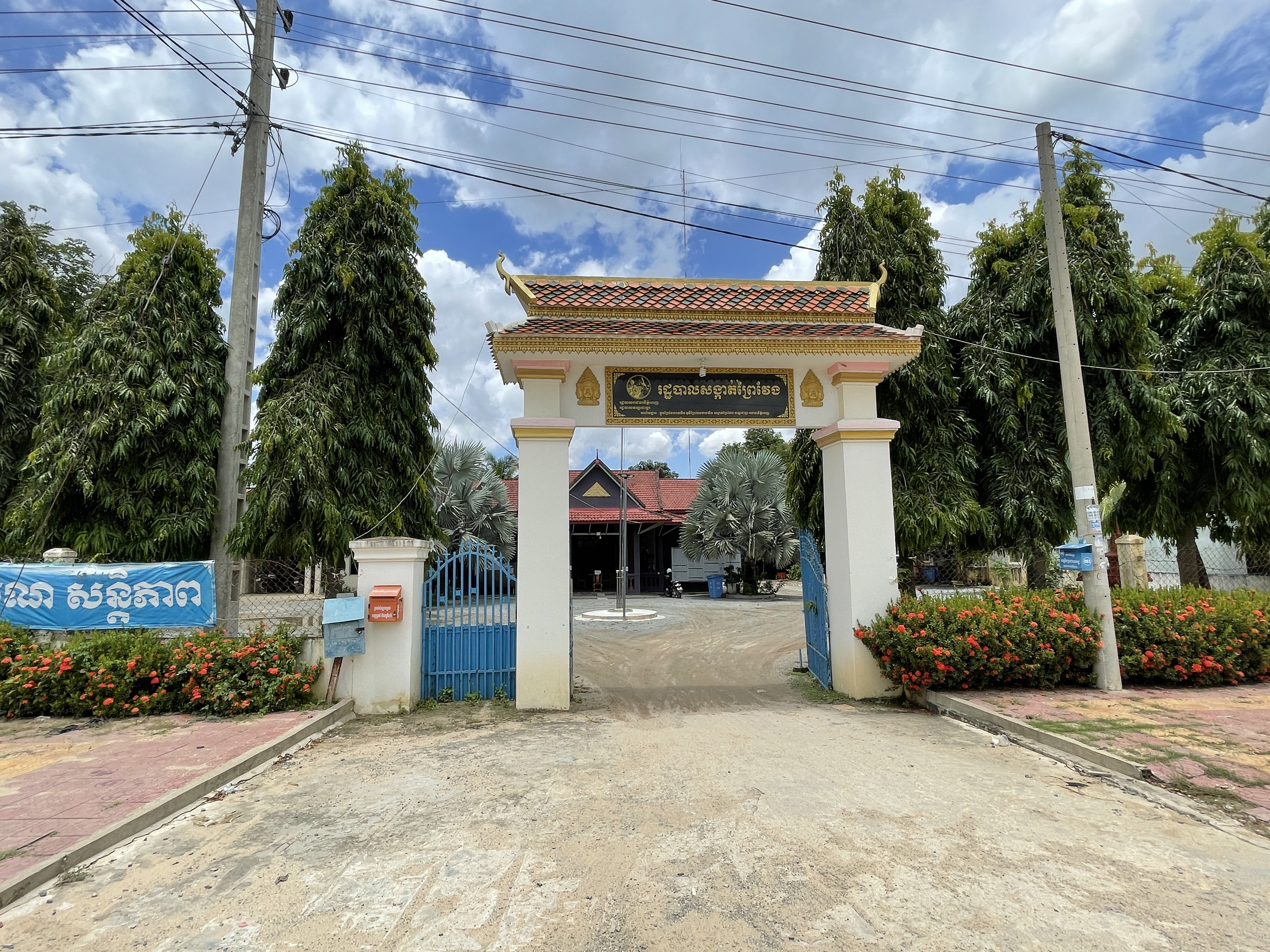
Prey Veng Commune Office

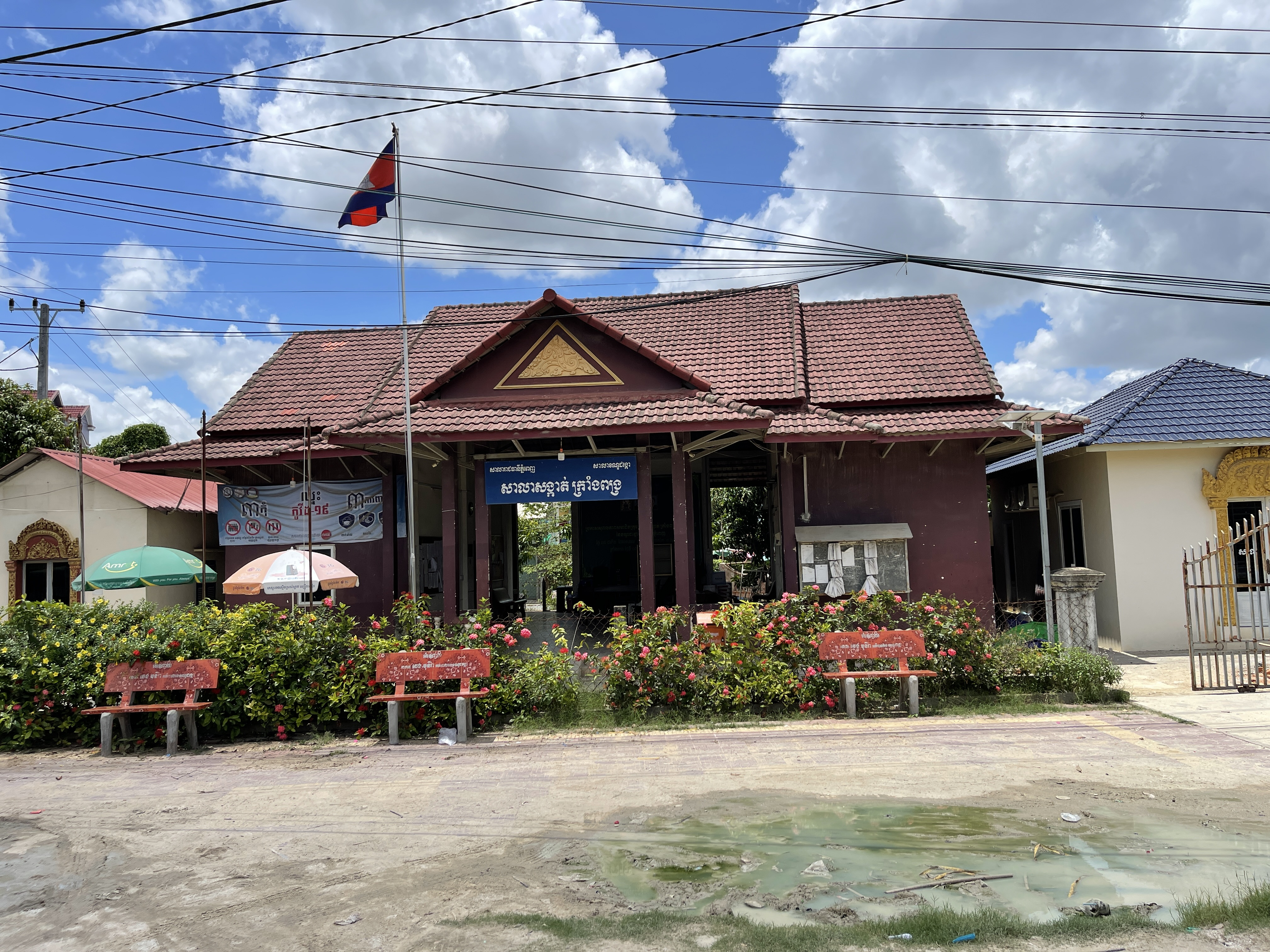
Krang Pongro Commune Hall

== Education ==
The Royal University of Agriculture is located in Dangkor District.

== Landmarks ==
Choeung Ek is in Dangkao Section. During the Covid-19 outbreak, the government of Cambodia bought Nokor Tep Women's Hospital which its location is in Khan Dangkao and changed its name to Luong Me Hospital in honor of Her Majesty the Queen-Mother Norodom Monineath Sihanouk in March 2021.

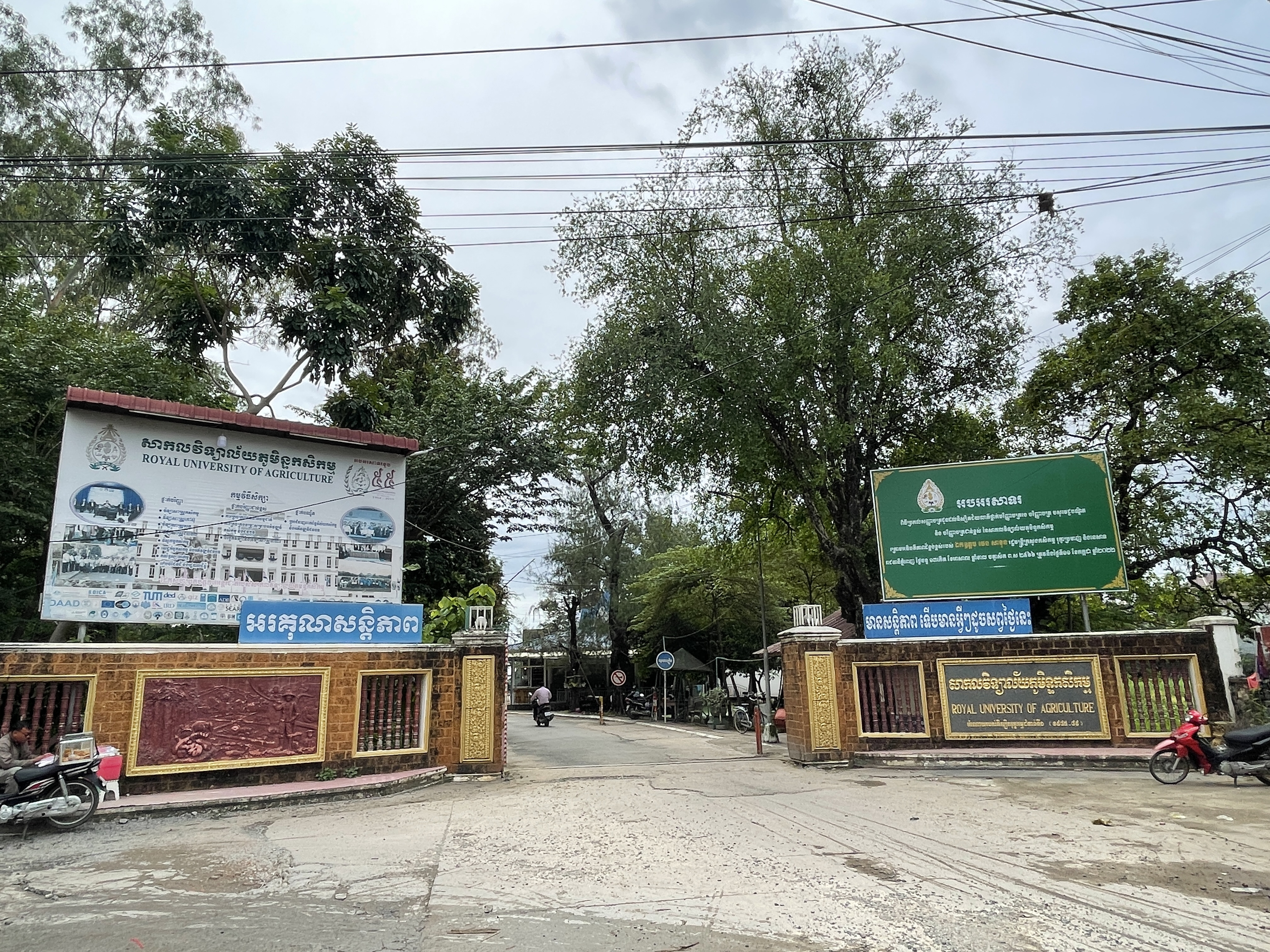
Royal University of Agriculture

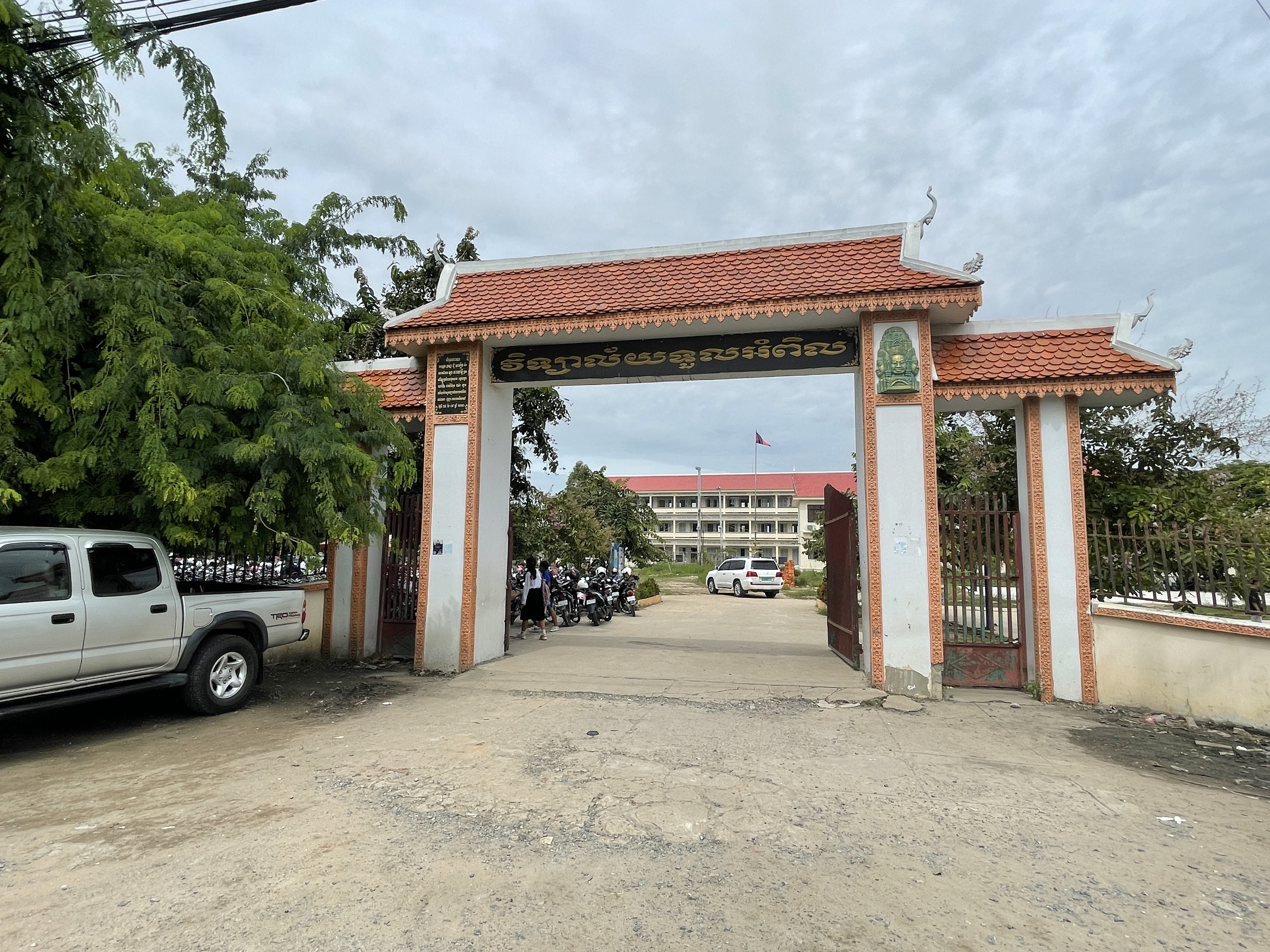
Tuol Ampil High School on Street 217

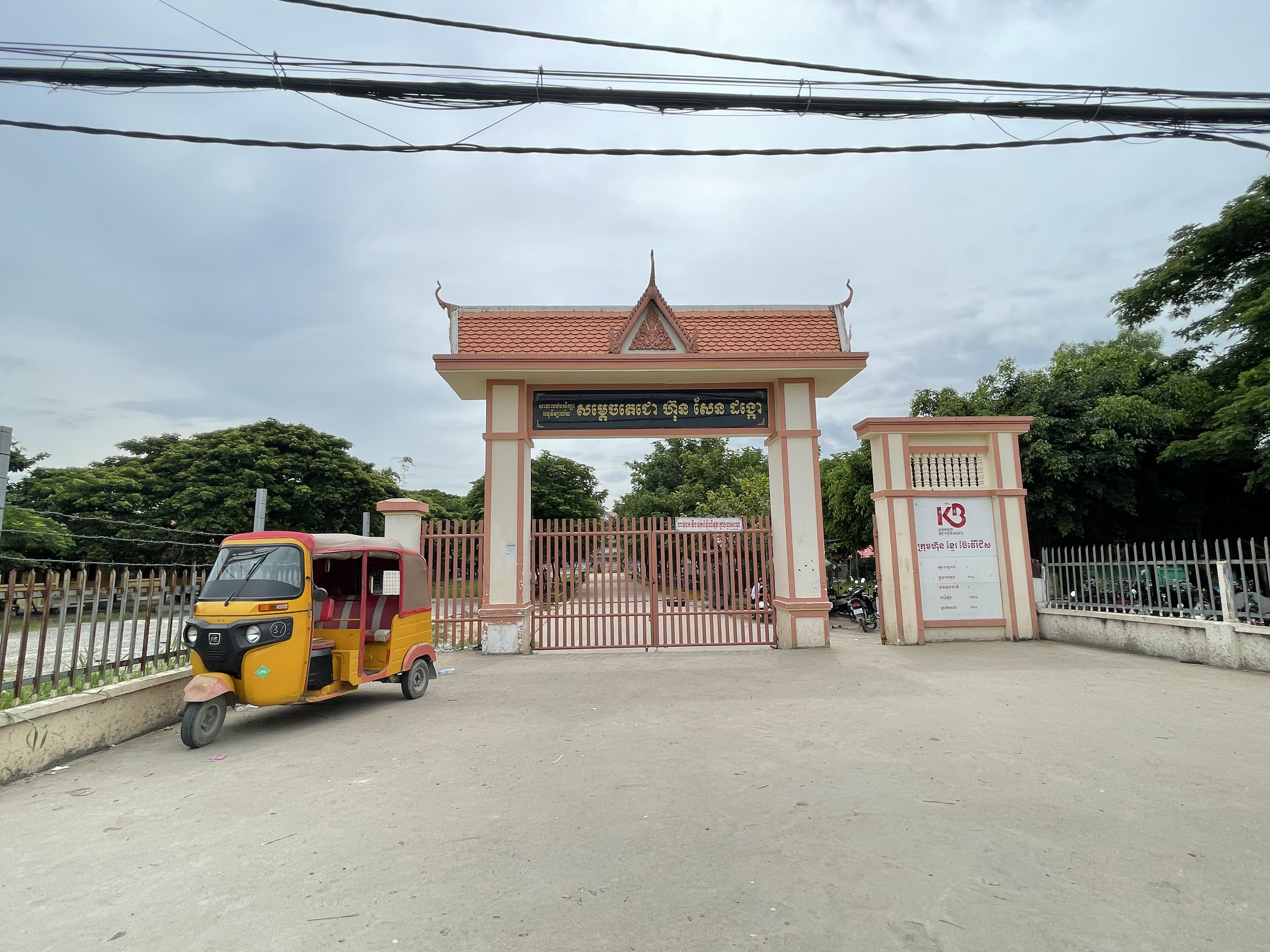
Samdech Techo Hun Sen Dangkor Primary and Secondary School

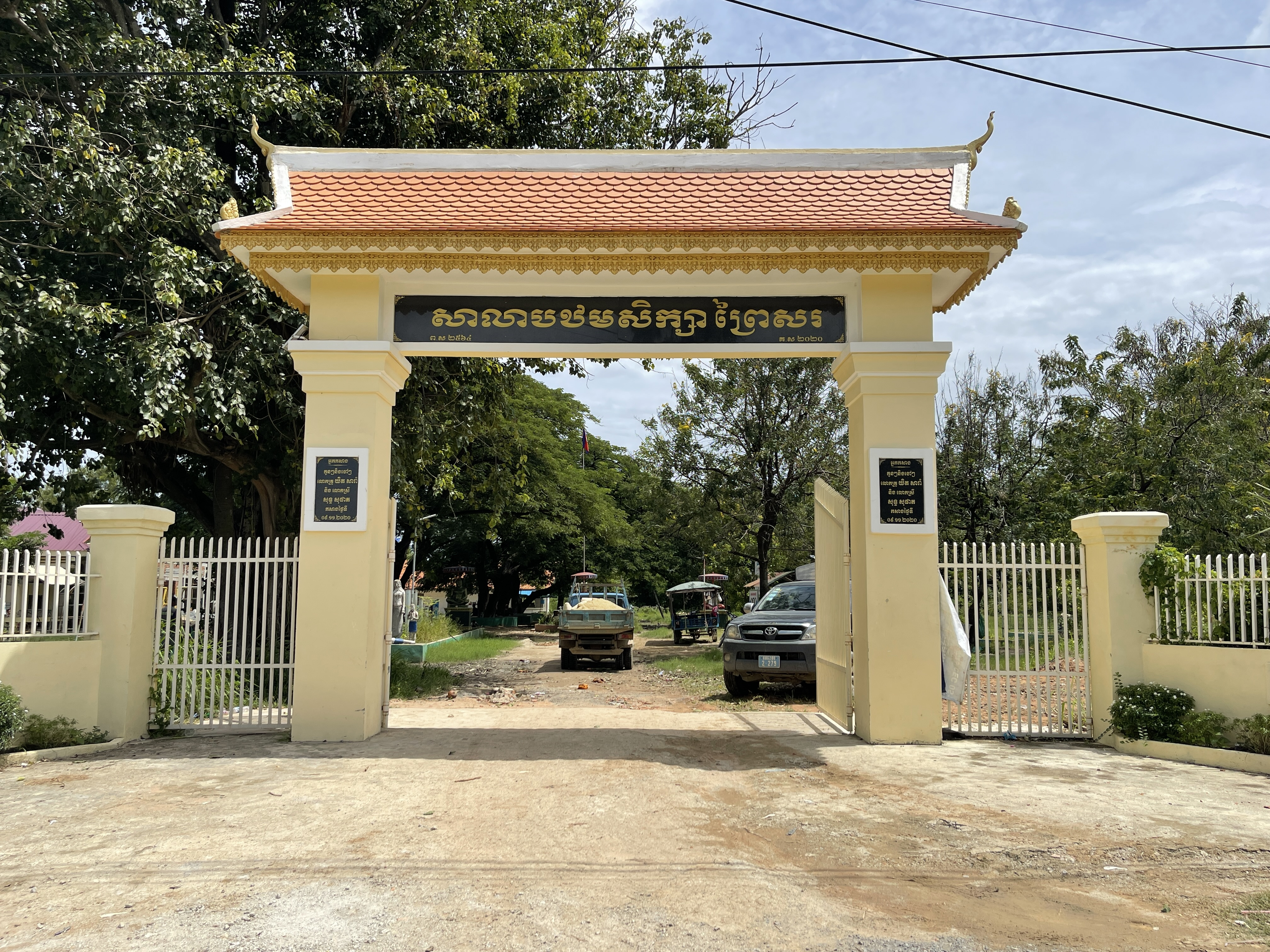
Prey Sor Primary School in Sangkat Prey Sor

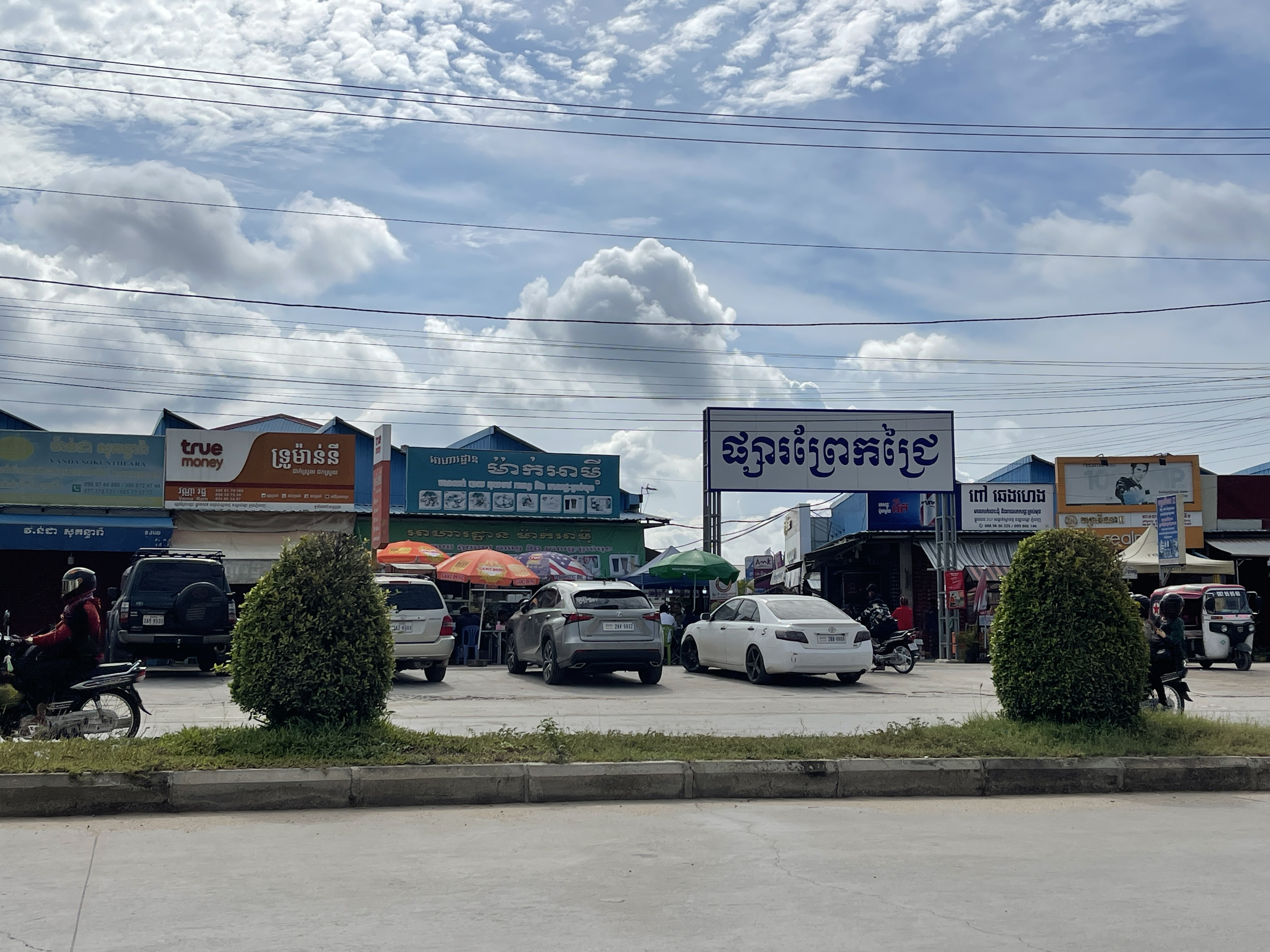
Prek Chrey Market on Street 217

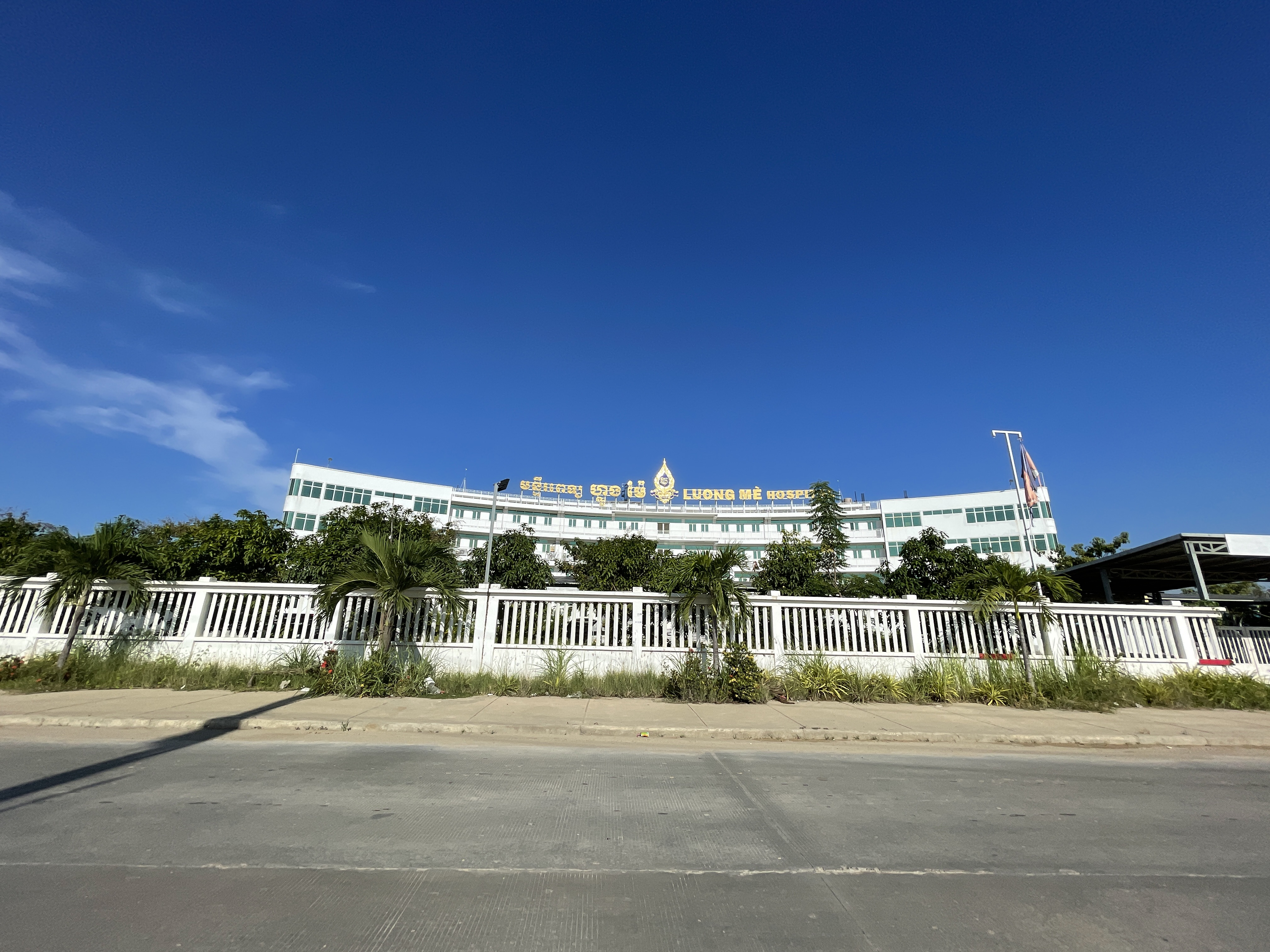
Luong Me Hospital, former Nokor Tep Women's Hospital

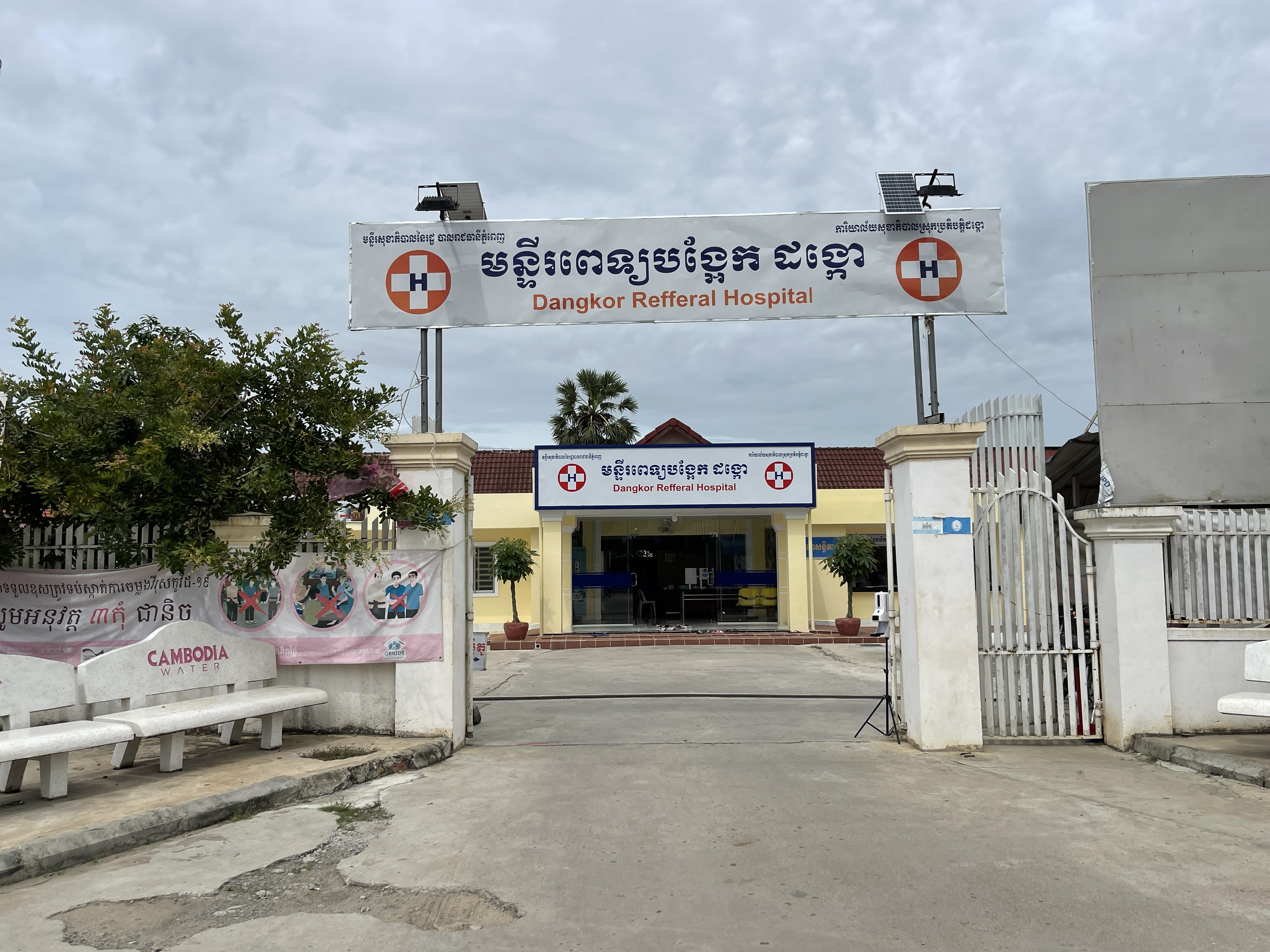
Dangkao Refferal Hospital

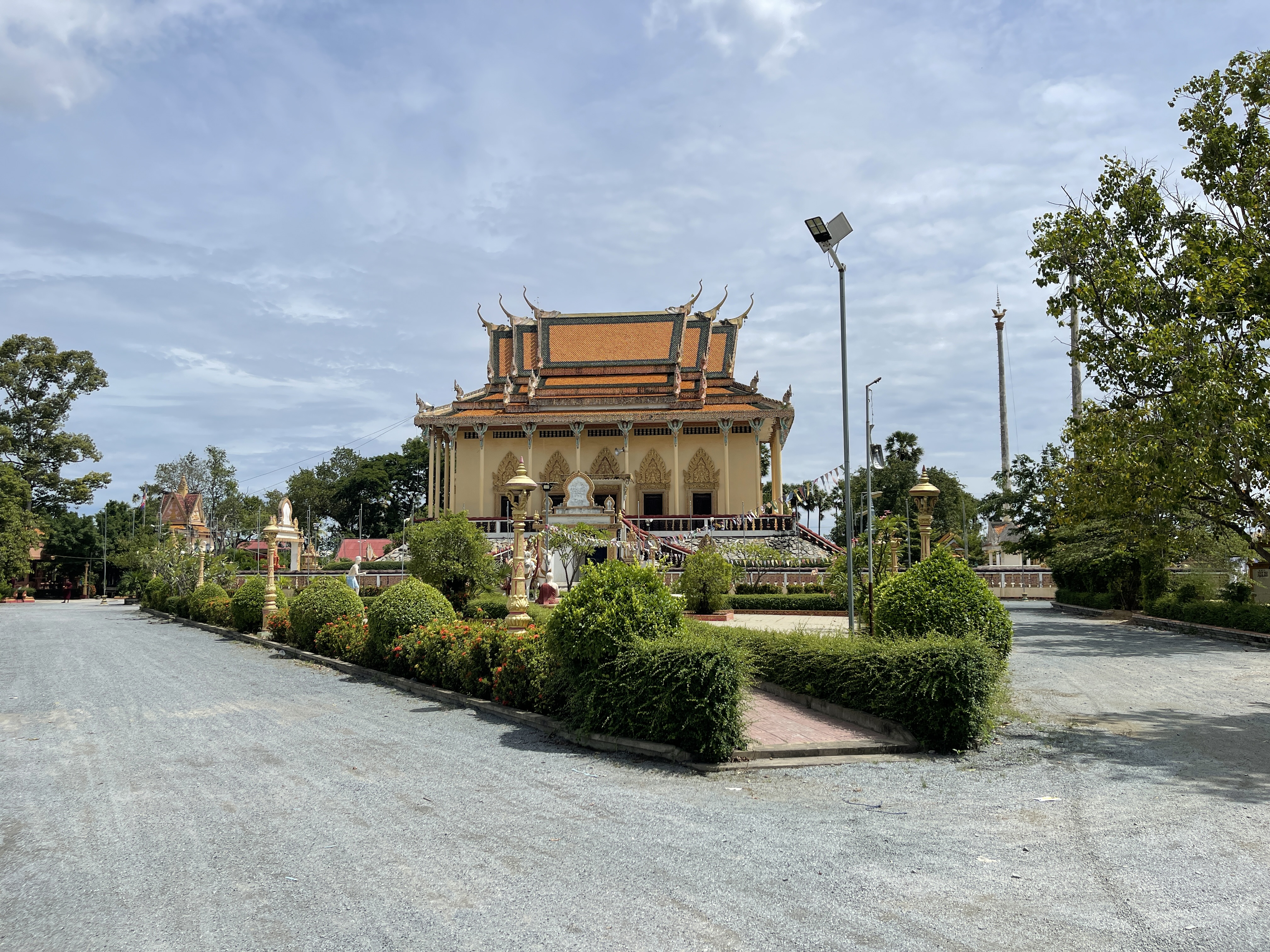
Wat Preah Thorm Trai (Wat Prey Sor)

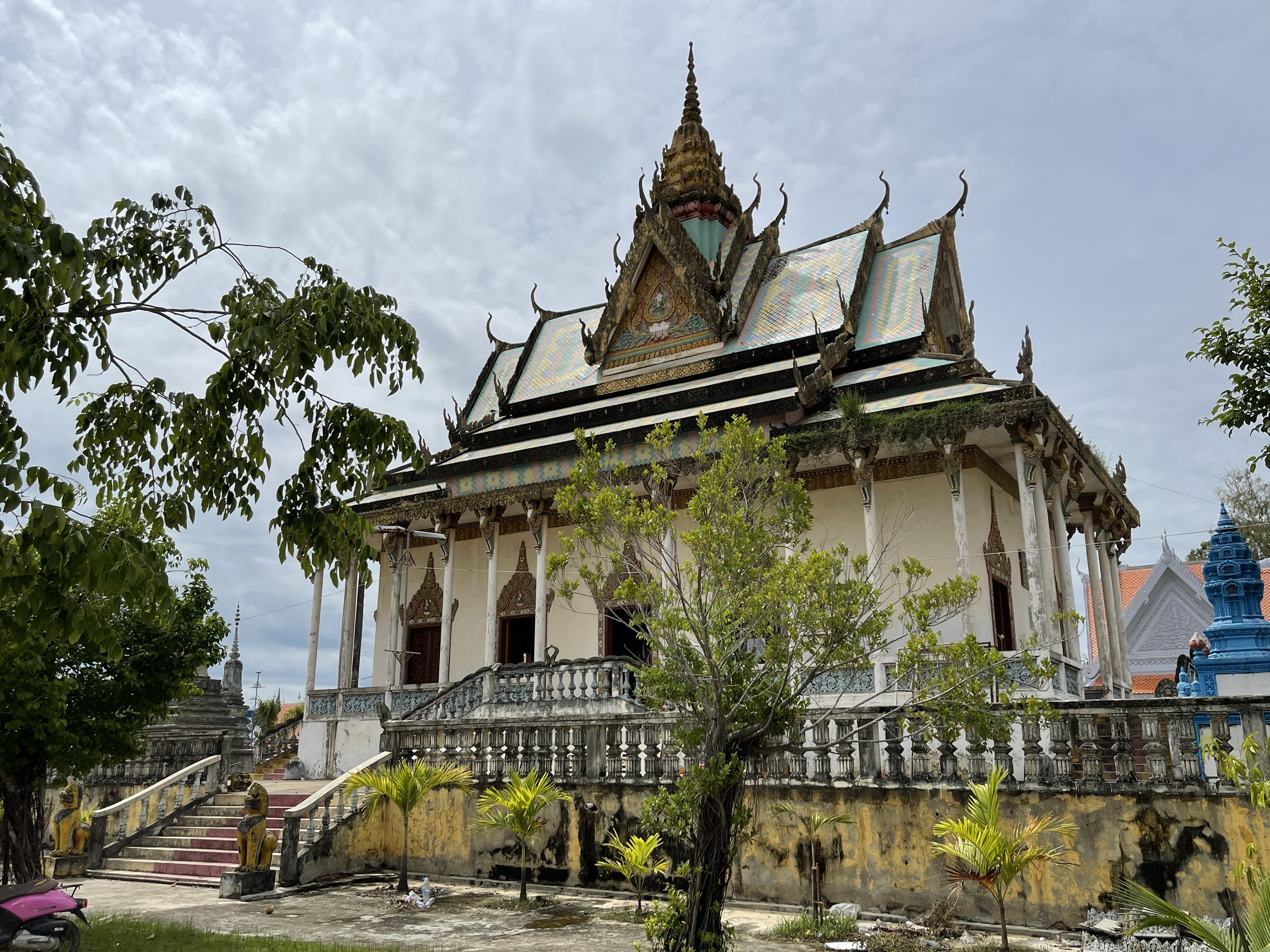
Wat Banchak Keo Mony Russey Sanh (Wat Russey Sanh)

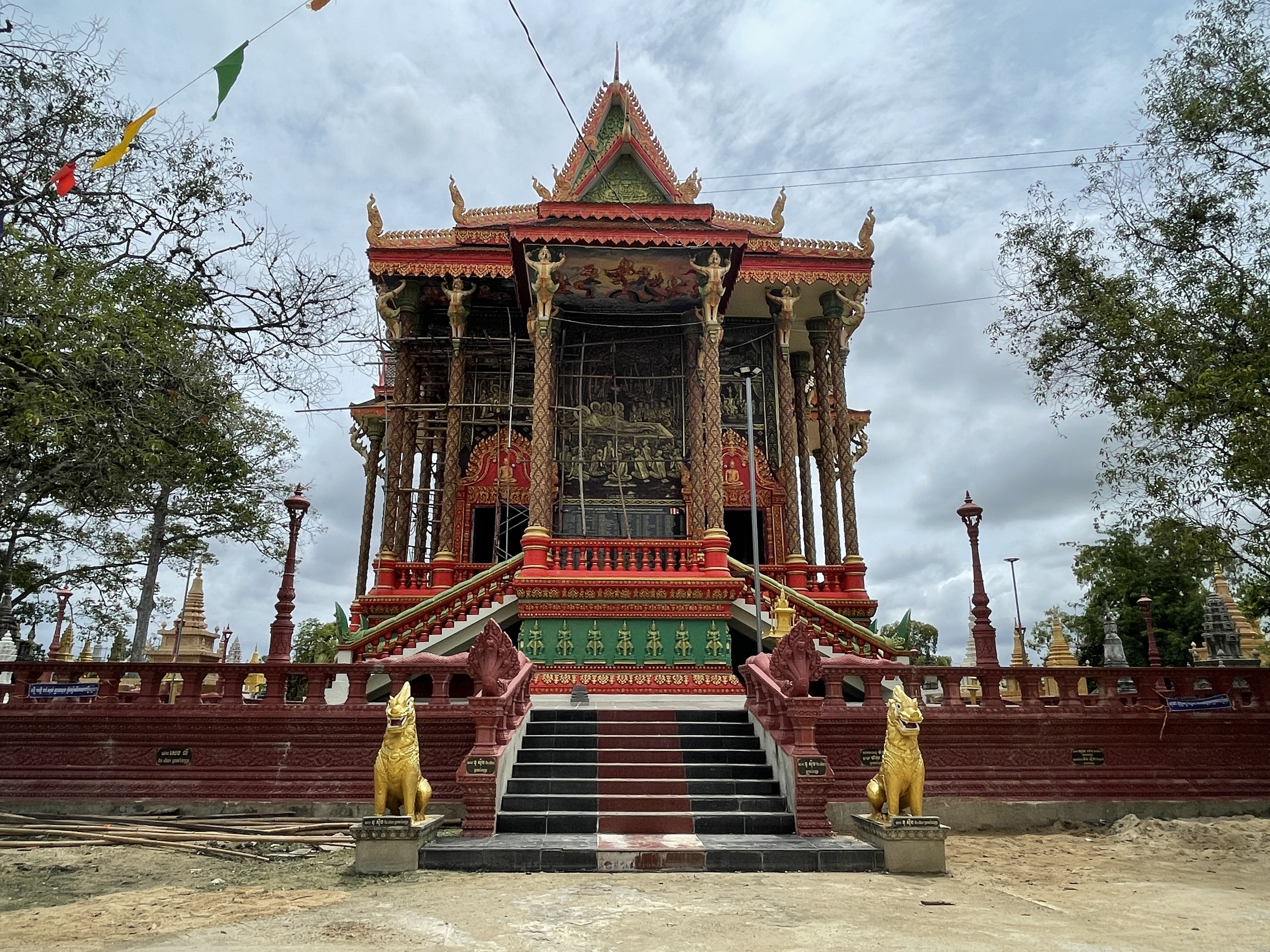
Wat Ang Meitrey, Sangkat Prey Sor

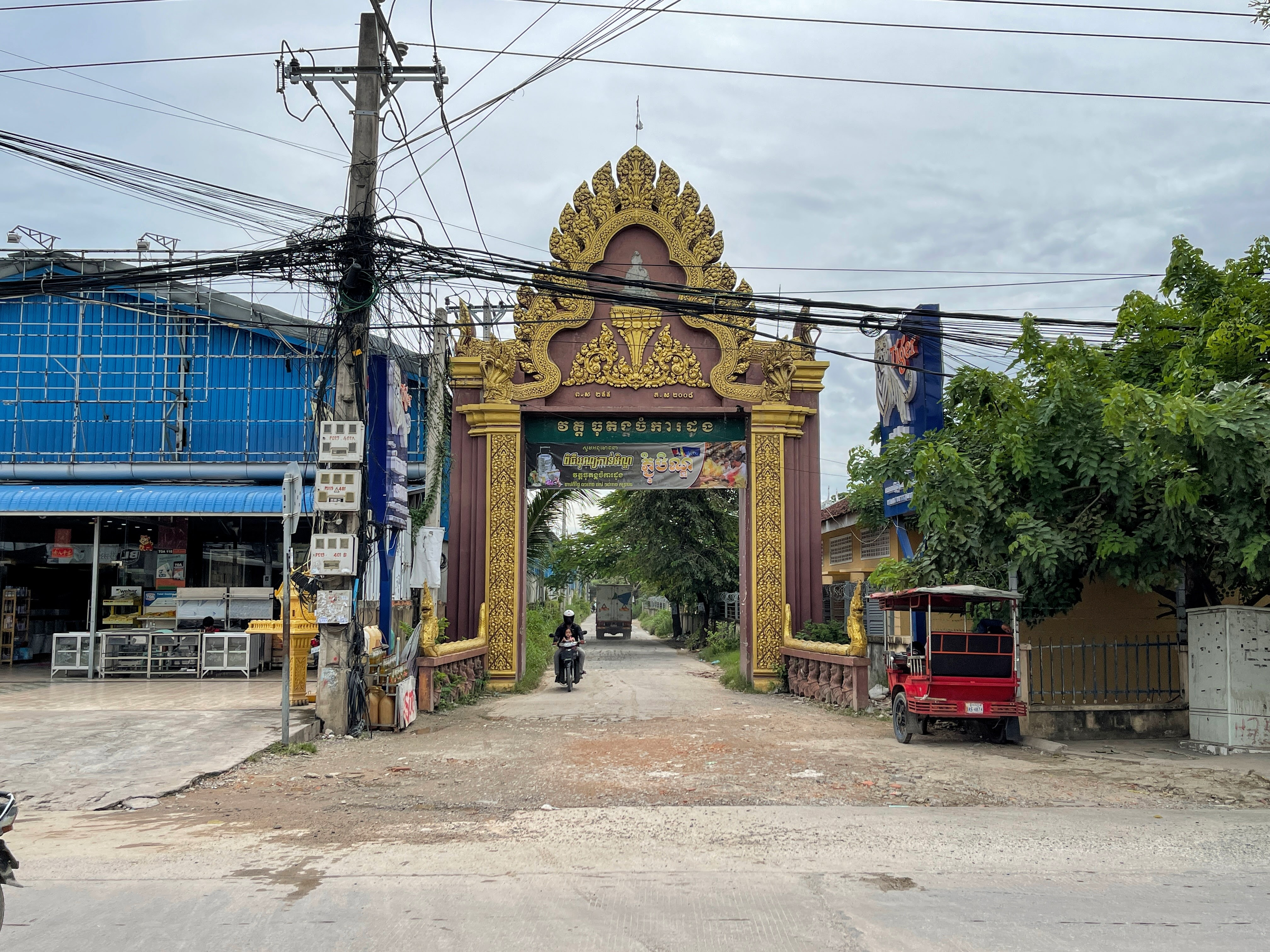
Wat Thu Dong Chamkar Doung
