= Water supply and sanitation in the United Kingdom =

Water supply and sanitation in United Kingdom
Data
- Access to an improved water source: 100% (2015)
- Access to improved sanitation: 99% (2015)
- Share of collected wastewater treated: 100%
- Continuity of supply: 100%
- Average water use (L/person/day): 137
- Share of household metering: 60% (2023)
- Non-revenue water: 20%, 2,900Ml/d (2024/25)

Institutions
- Decentralization to municipalities: None
- National water and sanitation company: None
- Water and sanitation regulator: Three regulators, one each for England/Wales
- Sector law: Water Industry Act 1991 (England & Wales); Water Industry (Scotland) Act 2002 (Scotland); Water and Sewage Services (Northern Ireland) Order 2006 (Northern Ireland)
- Service providers: 28

Public water supply and sanitation in the United Kingdom are characterized by universal access and generally good service quality. Unlike many other developed countries, the United Kingdom features diverse institutional arrangements across its constituent parts: (England and Wales; Scotland; and Northern Ireland). In England and Wales, water services are primarily provided by privatized companies, while in Scotland and Northern Ireland, these services are managed by publicly owned entities. Each region's unique approach is explored in separate articles, while this article is devoted to some common issues across the United Kingdom.

== History ==
Historically, water for drinking, general use, or sewerage was largely left to private arrangements. The recurrence of water poisoning, and large public health crises were a part of people's ordinary existence until scientific advances of the 19th century. After the Broad Street cholera outbreak of 1854, John Snow first identified the cause of cholera as drinking water being polluted by excrement. Following the Great Stink of 1858, where the River Thames had become so bad smelling that it offended the Queen and forced Parliament to relocate, Joseph Bazalgette began to build the London sewerage system.

Starting with the Public Health Act 1848 (11 & 12 Vict. c. 63), which created a local board of health in each council, and the Public Health Act 1866 (29 & 30 Vict. c. 90), local government began building drains, sewers, and piping clean water to households. The Waterworks Clauses Act 1847 (10 & 11 Vict. c. 17) and the Waterworks Clauses Act 1863 (26 & 27 Vict. c. 93) provided model constitutions for the growing number of private and local government water companies. The Public Health Act 1875 (38 & 39 Vict. c. 55) further mandated that all new houses have running water and internal drainage. By 1944, there were over 1,000 water suppliers in England and Wales, though 26 supplied half of the total volume, and 97 supplied an additional further quarter of total volume. The Water Act 1945 (8 & 9 Geo. 6. c. 42) organised a national water supply policy, before the Water Act 1973 (c. 37) finally consolidated the management of water resources into ten regional water authorities for England and Wales, along with additional authorities in Scotland and Northern Ireland. However, following a wave of privatisations, the Water Act 1989 (c. 15) changed the ten authorities into ten private water companies, each operating as a local monopoly, subject to price caps of a new regulator known as Ofwat.

Scotland retained public ownership of its water services following a public campaign, and Scottish Water, a publicly owned entity, continues to manage these services, and as a result has maintained significantly lower prices than in England and Wales.

== Access ==
Access to improved water supply and sanitation in the UK is universal. In 2015, 100% of the population had access to improved water supply and 99% of the population had access to "improved" sanitation.

		Urban (90% of the population)	Rural (10% of the population)	Total
Water	Broad definition	100%	100%	100%
	House connections	100%	98%	100%
Sanitation	Sewerage	97%	97%	97%

Source: WHO/UNICEF Joint Monitoring Program (2008)

== Water sources ==
According to the Environment Agency, total water abstraction for public water supply in the UK was 16,406 megalitres per day in 2007. Groundwater contributes 30 per cent of public supply water in England. In Wales and Scotland groundwater provides about five per cent of public supply. The majority of the UK's abstraction of surface water is from reservoirs, where rainwater is transported via rivers and streams and contained in an artificial or natural lake until it is required.

== Water supply and regulation by nation ==
Water is a universal human right, and basic to survival. While the UK has the fortune of substantial rainfall, climate damage means water resources are under pressure, and less predictable than before.

=== Scotland ===
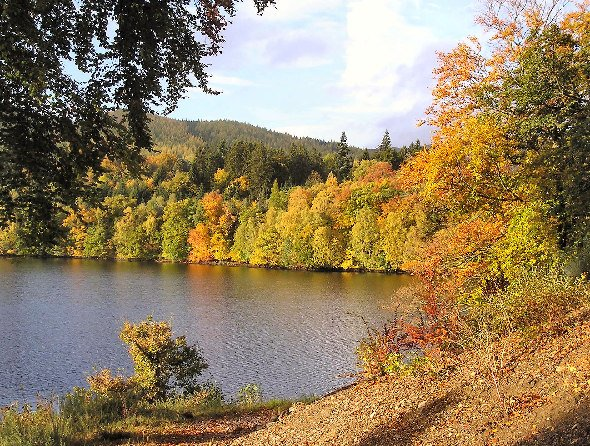
Loch Faskally is one of many reservoirs used by publicly owned Scottish Water. Its prices are around 10% lower than privatised English and Welsh water companies.

The publicly owned Scottish Water is appointed by Scottish ministers, and overseen by the Water Industry Commission for Scotland, although it has no direct voting power for customers. There is, however, a "Customer Forum" without any binding rights, but which may have some useful input.

In Scotland, it was thought that competition in sewer and water services could pose a public health risk.

=== Northern Ireland ===
Water and sewerage services in Northern Ireland are also provided by a single public entity, Northern Ireland Water.

=== England and Wales ===
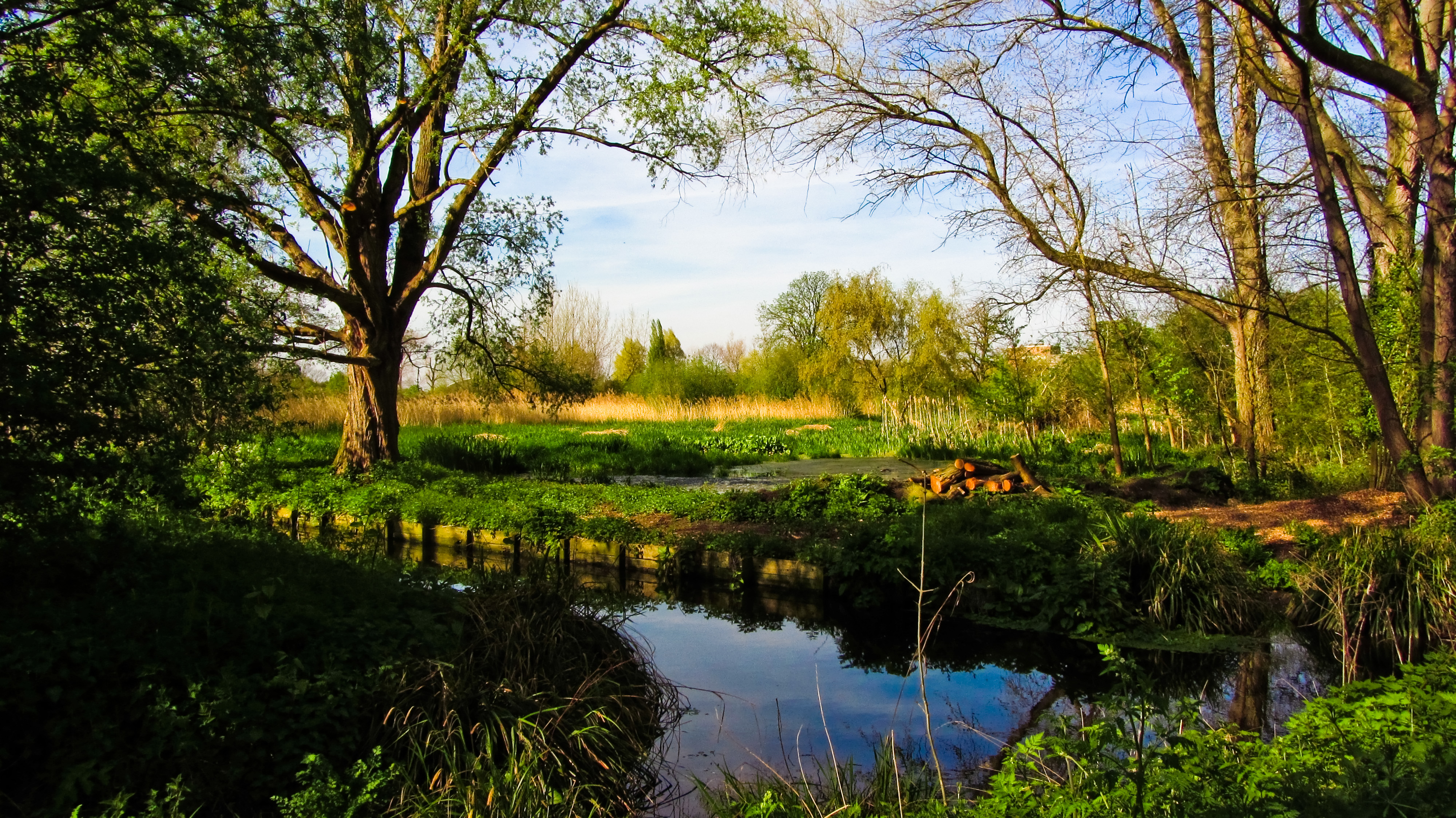
Under EU water law drinking water, bathing waters, and the general environment, like at the River Wandle, must be kept clean and improved.

In England there are 10 private regional water and sewerage companies and 13 mostly smaller private "water only" companies. Each company board is typically accountable to shareholders, mostly asset managers, under the Companies Act 2006. While both UK and EU law is clear that water companies, even if privatised, still are public bodies, these companies pursue shareholder profit, only restricted by regulation.

Ofwat (technically called the Water Services Regulation Authority) has at least three members appointed the Secretary of State, and is meant to "protect the interests of consumers, wherever appropriate by promoting effective competition" and yet ensure companies have a "reasonable returns on their capital", rather than simply act in the public interest. Ofwat licences companies (known as water "undertakers") to operate water and sewer services with "instruments of appointment", and can impose various conditions. Licences usually last 25 years but can be terminated on 10 years notice by government. Because of public outcry over rising prices, the government tried to construct more competition, with the Water Act 2014 requiring suppliers can access or pump water through other providers' pipes, for a reasonable cost, so that consumers might choose their company.

As real competition in natural monopolies always appeared unlikely, Ofwat has always set upper limits to prices, historically for 5-year periods. This has followed the formula of RPI - X + K, where prices should rise no more than the retail price index of inflation, reduced by efficiency savings (X), but allowing for capital investment (K). This means prices could be fixed down or go up. Companies must publicise an annual charging scheme approved by Ofwat, while Ofwat must openly report its work programme, report to the Secretary of State, keep a register of appointments and make information on costs available. Companies can appeal to the Competition and Markets Authority for disputes over access and price caps, while Ofwat can refer companies to the CMA for breaches of conditions. After unacceptable experience of people being disconnected by private companies for non-payment, new regulations introduced exemptions for vulnerable customers, particularly people who are unable to pay, have large families or have medical conditions. Everyone has the right for their property to be connected to a water supply and to sewers, but the cost of new connections is borne by the customer. UK water quality is generally high, since large new investments were made following the EU Drinking Water Quality Directive 1998, requiring water is "wholesome and clean". Ofwat is required to issue enforcement orders under the Water Industry Act 1991 section 18 to uphold drinking quality standards, rather than being content with "undertakings" from water companies.

The Drinking Water Inspectorate has powers of investigation. There are further standards for water companies to keep up water pressure in pipes, respond quickly to letters, phone calls and keep appointments, restore supply and provide water in emergencies, and stop sewer flooding or compensate up to £1,000. Finally, the Consumer Council for Water is meant to hear complaints and publicise issues with Ofwat and water companies, but its members are not elected by water customers and it has no legal power to bind Ofwat or the companies.

A 2022 study, found that over 70% of the English water industry is in foreign hands.

==== Water Supply (Water Fittings) Regulations 1999 ====
The Water Supply (Water Fittings) Regulations 1999 (SI 1999/1148) are regulations imposed on the England and Wales water industry by statutory instrument. The regulations were signed jointly by Michael Meacher, Secretary of State for the Environment, Transport and the Regions and Jon Owen Jones, Parliamentary Under-Secretary of State for Wales.

=== Environmental harm ===
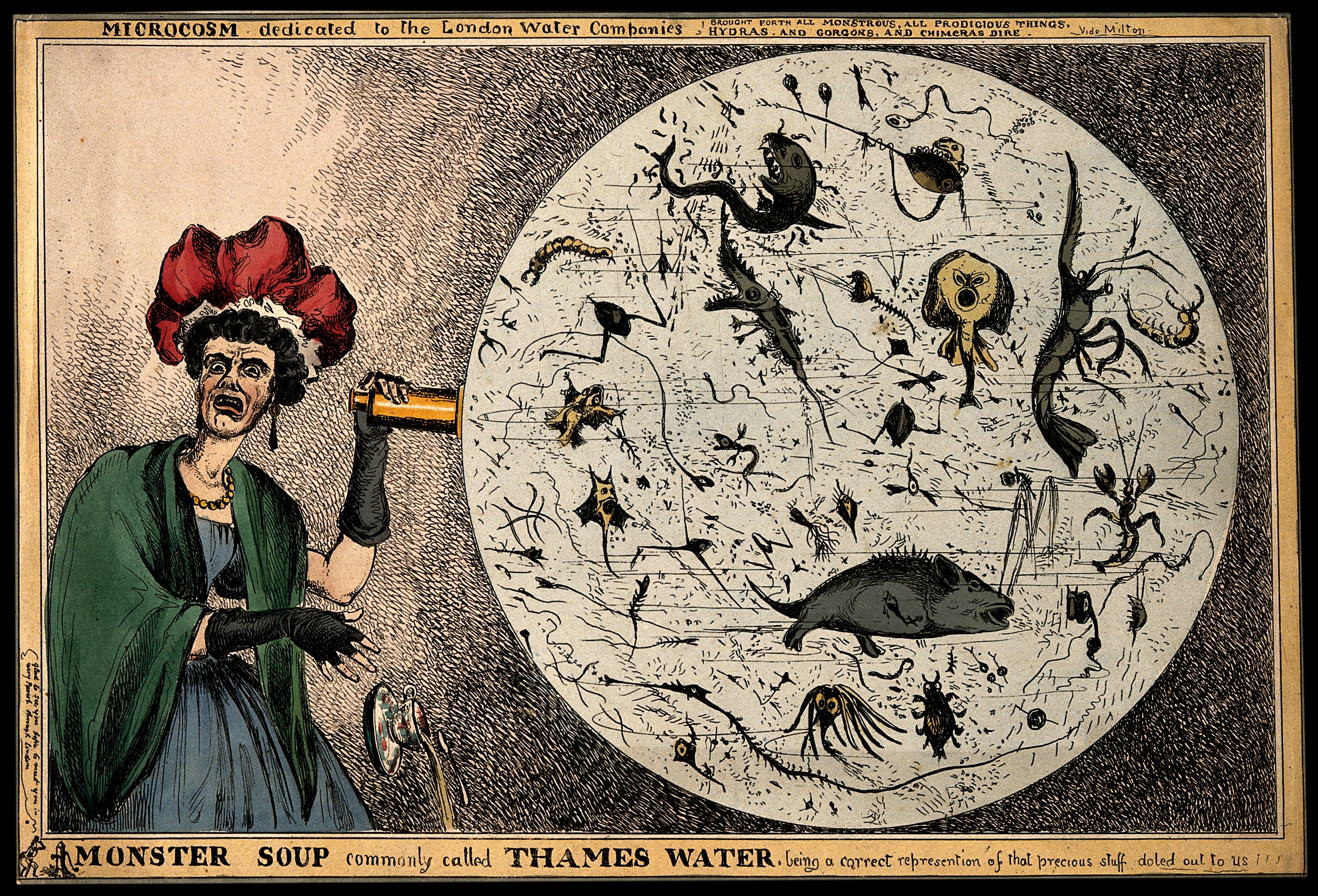
An 1828 cartoon of a woman dropping her teacup when she sees Thames Water magnified. After the Great Stink of 1858, the London sewerage system was built under Joseph Bazalgette.

The law has frequently failed to ensure businesses are fully responsible for water pollution. In principle, a water authority used to be strictly liable for damage it caused. However, more recently water company liability particularly for sewerage leaks has not appeared to as a sufficient deterrent. In R v Anglian Water Services Ltd the Court of Appeal held that fines for pollution should always be set to ensure sufficient deterrence, but on the facts reduced a fine from £200,000 to £60,000. In Marcic v Thames Water plc the House of Lords held that Thames Water plc was not liable in nuisance, or for breach of a homeowner's right to property, as sewerage repeatedly overflowed residents' gardens. According to Lord Hoffmann, the owners had to use statutory mechanisms to secure accountability rather than suing in tort. More recently in Manchester Ship Canal Co Ltd v United Utilities Water Plc the Supreme Court held that United Utilities was responsible for trespass and pollution of canalways, but only before 1991 when statutory reform provided immunity. By contrast, in Cambridge Water Co Ltd v Eastern Counties Leather plc, the House of Lords held that a tanner business was not liable for polluting the Cambridge Water supply with toxic chemicals, because it said the loss was not "reasonably foreseeable" and therefore too remote. These cases sit uneasily with the principle that polluters should pay, and the scheme of the Water Framework Directive 2000 to ensure proper enforcement of clean water standards.

The Environment Agency is responsible for environmental regulation, and the Drinking Water Inspectorate for regulating drinking water quality. The economic water industry regulator in Scotland is the Water Industry Commission for Scotland and the environmental regulator is the Scottish Environment Protection Agency.

== Employment ==
Total employment by UK water companies amounted to 41,000 full-time equivalent jobs in 2012/13, according to an analysis by the consulting firm Deloitte. In addition, 86,000 jobs were supported indirectly.

== Financial aspects ==
=== Tariffs ===
According to a 2006 survey by NUS Consulting the average water tariff (price) without sewerage in the UK for large consumers was the equivalent of US$1.90 per cubic metre. This was the third-highest tariff among the 14 mostly OECD countries covered by the report.

== Metering ==
A particularity of water tariffs in the U.K. is the low share of metering. Most users are not billed on a volumetric basis and have no financial incentive for water conservation. Since the 1990s efforts have been made to increase the share of household metering, which reached 33% in 2008 and 60% in 2023. In the 2000s the Environment Agency wanted to see 75% of households metered by 2025. The Fairness on Tap coalition (including National Trust, Waterwise, WWF and RSPB) is calling for the government to set out a strategy to install water meters in at least 80% of England where there is the greatest pressure on the freshwater environment and people's pockets, by 2020. Studies show that water meters lead to a 5–15% reduction in household water use.

== UK wide Fibre in Water ==
In 2021, the UK government Department for Digital, Culture, Media and Sport launched an open competition called 'Fibre in Water' to explore the potential for delivering broadband and mobile phone services via drinking water mains.

== Environmental criticisms ==
In July 2011, the think tank Policy Exchange reported a significant decline in river quality due to abstraction carried out by water companies. The report calls for water companies to be charged more for using the most environmentally vulnerable rivers and aquifers in drier parts of the country, with cheaper rates where water is more abundant. It also called for higher water charges during droughts.

In 2009, an investigation conducted by the BBC's Panorama concluded that the operation of more than 20,000 combined sewer overflow pipes (CSO) was leading to the routine spillage of untreated wastes around Britain's coastline, potentially leading to very dirty water around some of the most popular beaches in the UK. The CSOs, intended for use in very rare occasions, were not covered by the existing legislation for waste emissions.

== See also ==
- UK enterprise law
- EU water policy
- Water Framework Directive
- Water supply and sanitation in England
- Water supply and sanitation in Northern Ireland
- Water supply and sanitation in Scotland
- Water supply and sanitation in Wales
- Water supply and sanitation in Gibraltar
- History of public health in the United Kingdom
- Great Stink, extreme pollution in 1858
