= Water supply and sanitation in Scotland =

Data
- Water coverage (broad definition): 100%
- Sanitation coverage (broad definition): 100%
- Share of collected wastewater treated: High
- Continuity of supply: 100%
- Average water use (L/person/day): £29 per month
- Annual investment in WSS: £487 million in 2012-13 (£91 per capita)
- Share of self-financing by utilities: High
- Share of tax-financing: Low
- Share of external financing: 0%

Institutions
- Decentralization to municipalities: None
- Water and sanitation regulator: Water Industry Commission for Scotland
- Sector law: Water Industry Act 2002 and Water Services etc. Act 2005
- Service providers: 1 wholesale provider (Scottish Water), 19 retail providers

Public water supply and sanitation in Scotland is characterised by universal access and generally good service quality. Water and sewerage services are provided by a single public company, Scottish Water. The economic water industry regulator is the Water Industry Commission for Scotland, which "promotes the interests of water and sewerage customers in Scotland by making sure that householders and businesses receive a high-quality service and value for money by setting prices, monitoring Scottish Water's performance and facilitating competition in the water industry". The environmental regulator is the Scottish Environment Protection Agency. Drinking water standards are regulated by the Drinking Water Quality Regulator for Scotland.

== Service quality ==
The Water Commission measures the service quality of Scottish Water using an overall performance assessment (OPA) index, which takes into account unplanned supply interruptions, pressure, drinking water quality, responses to written complaints, ease of telephone contact, sewer floodings, sewage treatment works compliance and leakage. Scottish Water's OPA score improved from 162 in 2003–2004 to 400 in 2014–2015.

== Infrastructure ==
Scottish Water operates and maintains over 47,000 km (29,000 mi) of water pipes, 50,000 km (31,000 mi) of sewer pipes, 1,837 waste water treatment works (including 1,206 septic tanks) and 297 water treatment works plus pumping stations, sludge treatment centres and reservoirs.

== History ==
Prior to 1945, there were 210 separate organisations involved in drinking water supply in Scotland, but no mandatory requirement for such provision. This changed in 1946, when local authorities were required to provide a water supply to their communities. The first major rationalisation of the system took place as a result of the Water (Scotland) Act 1967, which created 13 Regional Water Boards, drawing together all the smaller suppliers. Although they worked well on a technical level, the issues of funding had not been adequately addressed. Because the cost of providing new sources of clean water was often beyond the abilities of local authorities to cope, the Central Scotland Water Development Board was also created by the Act and given the responsibility of providing new sources. They would then supply the water to local authorities in bulk. With the passing of the Local Government (Scotland) Act 1973, larger regions were created, and responsibility for water supply, alongside other local services, passed to the nine regional councils of Highland, Grampian, Tayside, Fife, Lothian, Borders, Central, Strathclyde, and Dumfries and Galloway. A tenth Island Area included Shetland, Orkney and the Western Isles, although they continued to act independently. The regional councils were also given responsibility for sewage treatment, which prior to the Act had been handled by 234 separate organisations.

Unlike in England and Wales, the assets of the industry were owned by local governments, many of which were not governed by the Conservative Party at the time of the water privatisation in England and Wales in 1989. However, with the passing of the Local Government etc. (Scotland) Act 1994, the UK government merged the water and sewerage responsibilities of the Regional and Island Councils into three regional public service providers, the North of Scotland Water Authority, the West of Scotland Water Authority, and the East of Scotland Water Authority, to prepare them for privatisation. In 1994, the Strathclyde water referendum, an unofficial referendum organised by Strathclyde Regional Council, the largest of the regional councils by population, was held, in which voters voted overwhelmingly against the privatisation proposals. There was also a more general Save Scotland’s Water campaign, and in the face of public opposition, the water industry in Scotland remained in the public sector.

In 2002 the Scottish Parliament passed the Water Industry (Scotland) Act 2002 merging the three providers into a single one, Scottish Water. In 2005 it passed the Water Services etc. (Scotland) Act 2005 allowing competition for "retail services" – defined as metering, billing and customer service – to business customers beginning in 2008, while wholesale services – defined as providing water and removing wastewater – remain a public monopoly. Besides Business Stream, 18 other companies have been licensed by the regulator to operate in the retail water services market. The companies buy bulk water at a discount of about 25% from the retail price and compete for retail customers.

== Financial aspects and efficiency ==
Tariffs The charge for the average household bill in Scotland in 2015–16 is around £346, which is lower than the average bills of all of the private water companies in England and Wales.

Investments Between 2010 and 2015, around £2.5 billion has been invested in Scotland in maintaining and improving the industry's assets, with £1 billion of this committed to improving drinking water quality, environmental and customer service performance.

Efficiency After its creation in 2002, Scottish Water was able to make large gains in efficiency, reducing operating expenditure by almost 40% between 2001–02 and 2009–10. Over the course of the 2010–15 regulatory period Scottish Water's controllable operating expenditure (spending that management is reasonably able to affect) increased by around 1.5%. The level of leakage at Scottish Water has declined from 1104 Megalitres (Ml) per day in 2005–2006 to 544 Ml per day in 2014–15.

== See also ==
- Northern Ireland Water
- Water Framework Directive
- Water supply and sanitation in Northern Ireland
- Water supply and sanitation in England and Wales
- Water supply and sanitation in the United Kingdom

== Bibliography ==
- Hendry, Sarah (2016). "Scottish Water: a public-sector success story". Water International. 41 (6): 900–915. doi:10.1080/02508060.2016.1212961. S2CID 157098264.
- Lobina, Emanuele; Terhorst, Philipp (29 January 2005). D19: WaterTime case study - Edinburgh, UK. Watertime EU Research Project.
- Matthews, Hugh; Gardiner, Vince (1999). The Changing Geography of the UK (3rd ed.). Routledge. ISBN 978-0-415-17901-0.
- SRM (2008). "Structure of the UK Water Industry". Water Research Centre. Archived from the original on 3 May 2017.
- Whitaker (2011). Whitaker's Almanac 2012 (144th ed.). Bloomsbury Publishing. ISBN 978-1-4081-3012-4.
