= Water supply and sanitation in England and Wales =

Public water supply and sanitation in England and Wales has been characterised by universal access and generally good service quality. In both England and Wales, water companies became privatised in 1989, although Dwr Cymru operates as a not-for-profit organisation. Whilst independent assessments place the cost of water provision in Wales and England as higher than most major countries in the EU between 1989 and 2005, the government body responsible for water regulation, together with the water companies, have claimed improvements in service quality during that period.

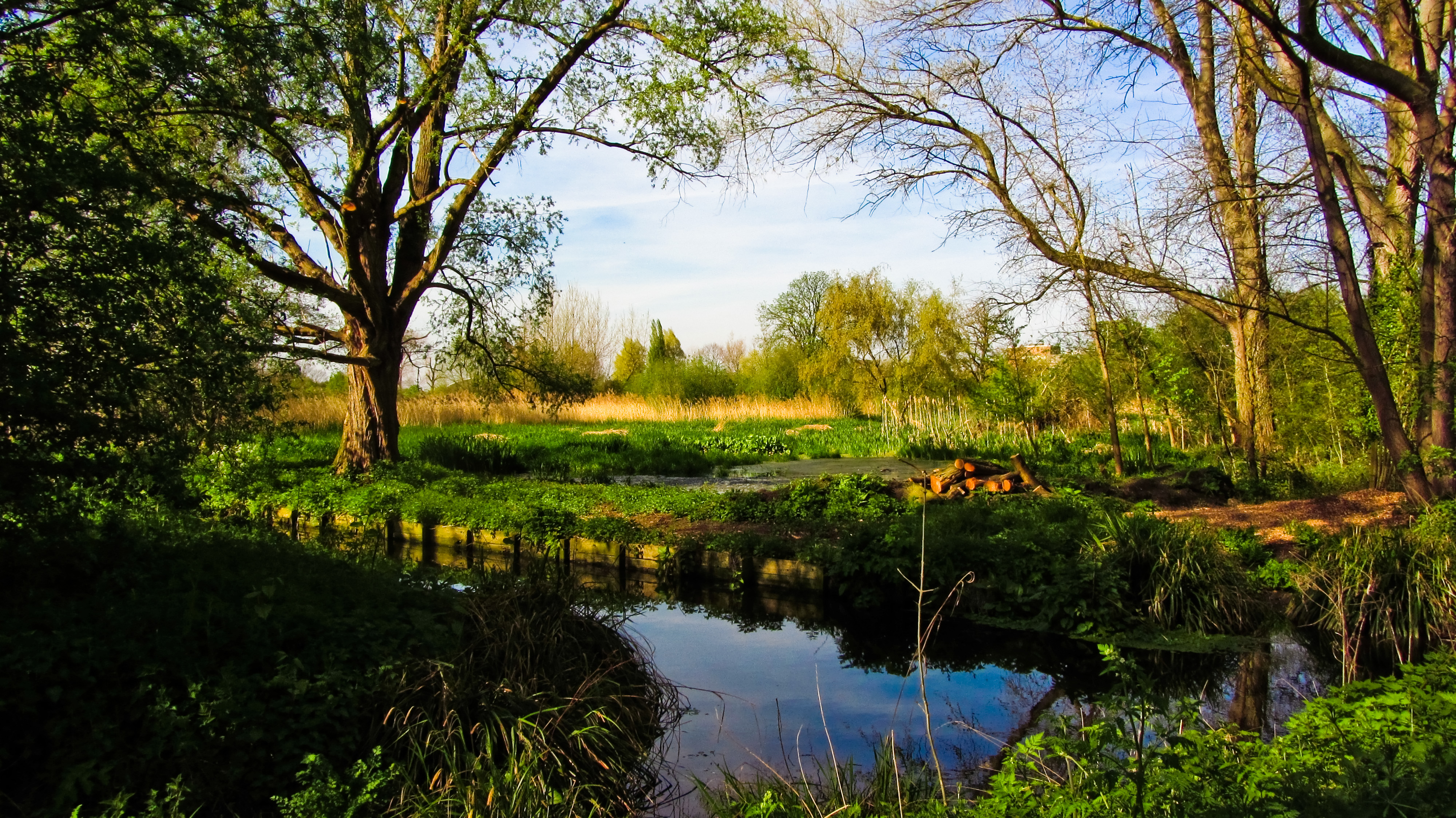
Water quality is generally very high in England and Wales.

The economic regulator of water companies in England and Wales is the Water Services Regulation Authority (Ofwat). The Drinking Water Inspectorate (DWI) provides independent reassurance to consumers that water supplies in England and Wales are safe and that drinking water is of acceptable quality.

Since Welsh devolution began, further powers over water have been devolved to the Senedd. The Government of Wales Act 2006 (GoWA) devolved multiple water policy powers including water supply, management of water resources including reservoirs, water quality, consumer representation, management of flood risk and coastal protection. The GoWA 2006 was changed by the Wales Act 2017 which includes devolution of water and sewerage powers, and in 2013 Natural Resources Wales became independently responsible for managing water resources in Wales. In 2018, secretary of state for Wales' intervention powers over cross-border water matters were repealed and replaced by the water protocol.

== History of joint England and Wales operations (up to 2013) ==
=== Local government service provision (before 1973) ===
Before 1973 water and sanitation services were provided by water undertakings and sewerage and sewage disposal authorities respectively. Until the 1950s there existed over a thousand water undertakings, with administrative boundaries similar to those of local government boundaries. By the early 1970s their number had been reduced to 198 by a gradual consolidation process aimed at achieving economies of scale. Out of the 198 water undertakings 64 were run by individual local government authorities, 101 by joint boards comprising several local government authorities, and 33 were statutory privately owned water companies, some of which date back to the Victorian era. At the same time there were over 1,300 sewerage and sewage disposal authorities, most of them run by individual local government authorities. The sector thus was highly fragmented.

Water resources management was entrusted to 29 river authorities created in 1965. Their responsibilities included water conservation, land drainage, fisheries, control of river pollution and, in some cases, navigation.

=== Public regional companies (1973–1989) ===
Through the Water Act 1973 the government established ten regional water authorities in order to achieve even greater economies of scale, especially in sanitation, compared to the prior gradual consolidation of water undertakings. The reform was also aimed at putting in practice the principle of integrated river basin management, especially concerning the planning of investments in wastewater treatment. Given the small size of many river basins in England and Wales, in practice the area covered by each of the regional water authorities typically contained more than one river basin.

The regional water authorities were not only in charge of water supply and sanitation, but also of water resources management, thus opening the possibility of conflicts of interest since the same institution was in charge of abstracting water and discharging wastewater on the one hand, and controlling these same abstractions and discharges on the other hand. The Water Act left open the possibility to contract out water supply and sanitation services to local authorities. However, in practice this did not happen, and substantial assets were transferred from local governments to the new water authorities. Since the transfer was internal to the public sector, no compensation was paid to local authorities. Local authorities also initially held a majority of the board seats of the new organisations. The private statutory water companies, which provided water to 25% of the population, escaped reorganisation and were left to operate as before.

With the election of Margaret Thatcher in 1979 the water and sanitation sector initially remained public, but the government attempted to make the enterprises operate more along commercial lines. As a result, the number of employees in the sector declined from 61,000 in 1976 to 52,000 in 1985, real operating costs declined, tariffs were increased above the inflation rate and the share of self-financing of investments increased. However, government regulators also cut back on investments. While the industry became profitable, the rate of return on assets based on replacement cost values remained low at less than 2%. As part of the attempt to commercialise the service providers, the Water Act 1983 reduced the number of board members of the water authorities. However, it also eliminated the local government representation on the Boards and made all Board members appointed by Ministers, thus further centralising the sector.

=== Privatisation (1989) ===
In 1989 the government privatised the ten public regional water authorities through divestiture (sale of assets). The authorities' functions related to water resources management were separated and retained by the public sector. At the same time the regulatory agency OFWAT was created, following the model of infrastructure regulatory agency set up in other sectors such as telecommunications and energy.

=== Water Industry Act 1999 ===
The Water Industry Act 1999 made several important clarifications and amendments to legislation regarding the power and responsibilities of the privatised water and sewerage companies. These include:

- Removing the right of a water company to disconnect customers on the basis of outstanding unpaid bills.
- Clarifying that water companies can continue to charge customers using rateable value where no water meter has been installed at a property.
- Allowing consumers to request a water meter, and obliging the local water company to install a meter unless the installation is not reasonably practical or would incur an unreasonable expense.

=== Operations ===
==== Water resources and uses ====
The amount of water available in England and Wales to meet the needs of people and to sustain the water environment varies greatly between different places and seasons, and from one year to another. Parts of Wales and the English Lake District are well endowed with water, while water is scarce in parts of Eastern and Southeastern England. Parts of England were affected by severe drought in 1976, 1995 and 2005-2007.

Household water use in England and Wales stood at about 145 litres/capita/day in 2008/09. Total water supply for domestic and commercial customers in England and Wales was 14.5 million cubic metres per day in 2009.

==== Quality of service ====
In 2008, the quality of water and sanitation services in England and Wales was regularly and comprehensively monitored by the economic regulator, OFWAT. OFWAT statistics show that service quality has improved since the early 1990s, i.e. shortly after services were privatised. For example, the number of unplanned interruptions, properties at risk of low pressure, the share of complaints that were not answered within five days and combined sewer overflows have all declined, while sewage treatment works compliance has increased and river water quality has improved.

Drinking water quality is also universally high, although isolated incidents where quality falls have occurred. For example, in June 2008 about 250,000 people in Northamptonshire were being told to boil tap water for drinking after routine tests by Anglian Water found cryptosporidium

==== Infrastructure ====
Map of all major water transfer schemes in England and Wales in 2011

In 2008, physical assets of private water and sanitation companies in England and Wales include 1,000 reservoirs, over 2,500 water treatment works and 9,000 sewage treatment works. More than 700,000 kilometres of mains and sewers are buried beneath the ground – that’s enough to stretch to the moon and back, or a distance 200 times greater than the UK’s entire motorway network.

==== Financial aspects ====
Tariff level. Water and sanitation tariffs in England and Wales increased by 44% in real terms between 1989 and 2008–09 and are among the highest in the world. The average household water and sewage bill in England and Wales was £330 in 2008-09. According to a 2006 survey by NUS Consulting Group, the average water tariff (price) without sewerage in the U.K. for large consumers was the equivalent of US$1.90 per cubic metre, the third-highest tariff among the 14 mostly OECD countries covered by the report. A study commissioned by the German industry association BGW in 2006 compared the average household water and sanitation bill (as opposed to the tariff per cubic metre that the NUS study used as a comparator) in four EU countries. This study showed that water bills in England and Wales were the highest among the four countries. Average water bills (excluding sanitation) were 295 euro per year in England and Wales, higher than in Germany, France (85 euro) or Italy (59 euro). From April 2023, household bills in England and Wales were to rise to an average of £448 a year, the largest increase in almost 20 years.

Comparison of annual water and sanitation bills in four EU countries, 2006:

	Water tariff	Sewer tariff	Total
Germany	€85	€111	€196
England and Wales	€95	€93	€188
France	€85	€90	€175
Italy	€59	€40	€99

Source: Metropolitan Consulting Group: VEWA - Vergleich europaeischer Wasser- und Abwasserpreise, 2006, p. 7 of the executive summary

Taking into account differences in subsidies and service quality, the cost of supplying water at an equalised service level would be 84 euros in Germany, 106 euro in both France and England/Wales, and 74 euro in Italy. Concerning sanitation, unequalised tariffs are the highest in Germany at 111 euro per year, 93 euro in England and Wales, €90 in France and only €40 in Italy. Equalised costs net of subsidies are, however, highest in England and Wales with €138, followed by France (€122), Germany (119 euro) and Italy (85 euro).

Tariff structure and cross subsidies. Metered connections are charged at a volumetric rate, while unmetered connections are charged at a flat rate based on the rateable value of the property. The rateable value system was intended as a cross subsidy from wealthier to poorer households. However, since rateable values are often outdated, the subsidy is poorly targeted. Since more and more highly rated households opt for metering, flat rates for the remaining unmetered customers are being increased to compensate for the lost revenue. As a result, the already imperfect cross-subsidy system is unwinding. An Independent Report on Charging for Household Water and Sewerage Services published in 2009 by Anna Walker recommended a package of help to ensure that "the transition to metering is not to cause real problems of affordability to those on low incomes".

Tariff review procedures. Water and sanitation tariffs are regulated by OFWAT, which sets caps for tariff changes over five-year asset management plan periods. In the 2000–2005 review period OFWAT mandated an average annual reduction of tariffs of 1.6%. However, in the 2006–2010 review period it has allowed an average annual increase of 4.2%.

Affordability. As a proportion of income, in England and Wales the cost of water and sewerage together works out at less than 1.5% of weekly earnings. More details on tariffs in England and Wales are provided in OFWAT's annual reports on water and sewerage charges.

==== Investment and financing ====
Average annual investments in water and sewerage in England and Wales were £3.3 billion in 2000–2005 and £3.6bn in 2005–2010, according to OFWAT, which corresponds to £61 per capita per year. According to the industry association Water UK, between 1980 and 2010 the water and wastewater industry in England and Wales will have invested over £88bn.

Investments are financed primarily through self-financing and borrowing in the capital market. In March 2006 overall borrowing stood at £23.5bn for England and Wales. Net returns on this borrowing in 2006 were 6.6%.

==== Efficiency (water losses) ====
According to OFWAT leakage in England and Wales has declined significantly from 228 litres/property/day in 1994-95 to 141 L/p/d in 2006–07, enough to supply the needs of 10 million people. According to the Environment Agency, many companies in the UK have reduced their water loss to the economic level of leakage. This is the level at which, in the long-term, the marginal cost of leakage control is equal to the marginal benefit of the water saved. The rate of reduction in leakage has slowed for many companies because the most obvious causes of leakage have been detected and addressed, leaving only less apparent leakage problems. Models have been developed and fine-tuned to assess the economic level of leakage. A summary of the debate on these models can be found in a recent report by OFWAT.

According to a 2006 comparative study commissioned by the German water industry association BGW average water losses in the distribution network in England and Wales have been estimated at 19 per cent. They are lower than in France (26 per cent) or Italy (29 per cent), but higher than in Germany, where they are apparently only 7 per cent. The study states that its methodology allows for an accurate comparison, including water used to flush pipes and for firefighting. This is consistent with the International Water Association's definition of non-revenue water, which includes authorised non-metered consumption such as for flushing and firefighting.

==== Metering ====
A particularity of water tariffs in England and Wales is the low share of metering. Most users are not billed on a volumetric basis and have no financial incentive for water conservation. Since the 1990s efforts have been made to increase the share of household metering, which reached 33% in 2008 for the UK. The Environment Agency would like to see 75% of households metered by 2025. Studies show that water meters lead to a 5-15% reduction in household water use.

In 2006 the Environment Agency announced it favours compulsory metering in water-scarce southern England. The measure is controversial. Consumer groups fear it will penalise poorer families with many children, and the disabled, who use more water. In March 2006 the company Folkestone & Dover Water Services was granted the power to install compulsory water meters in a landmark ministerial ruling under which it was given 'water scarcity status' by Environment Minister Elliot Morley. In a written ministerial statement, Mr Morley said: 'In many parts of the country, water is a precious resource which we can no longer simply take for granted.'

==== Operational criticisms ====
A 2001 study by the Public Services International Research Unit, which is affiliated with trade unions and opposes privatisation, stated that

- tariffs increased by 46% in real terms during 1990-2000
- operating profits have more than doubled (+142%) in eight years, between 1991-2000
- investments were reduced and
- public health was jeopardised through cut-offs for non-payment.

== England (since 2013) ==
=== Retail market for businesses ===
As of 2022, the deregulated non-household market includes 1.2 million businesses, charities and other organisations.

Since 1 April 2017, under reforms known as Open Water, most businesses, charities and public sector organisations in England have been able to choose which company supplies their retail water services. Open Water, operated by Ofwat, explains that

The open water business retail market works like many other open utility markets, such as telecoms, electricity and gas. Retail suppliers buy wholesale services, (the physical supply of water and/or removal of wastewater), and offer a package to sell to eligible customers. ... Retail suppliers compete for customers by offering them the best deal.

Deregulation was designed to deliver lower bills, increase water usage efficiency and improve customer satisfaction.

=== Foreign ownership in England ===
A 2022 study found that over 70% of the English water industry is in foreign hands (foreign ownership).

=== Responsibility ===
Within the government the Department of Environment, Food and Rural Affairs (Defra) has the responsibility for policy in the water and sanitation sector in England only. The Environment Agency is responsible for water quality and resource in England. The economic regulator of water companies in England and Wales is the Water Services Regulation Authority, Ofwat and The Drinking Water Inspectorate (DWI) provides independent reassurance to consumers that supplies are safe and of drinking water quality.

=== Reports ===
The Environment agency also makes "Water situation reports for England" which include monthly water situation reports and weekly rainfall and river flow reports.

=== Demand ===
The Committee on Climate Change has predicted that demand for water in England will be greater than the available supply by between 1.1 and 3.1 billion litres per day by the 2050s.

=== Leakage ===
3 billion litres (20% of total supply) is lost daily via pipe leakages and the Department has been criticised for not emphasising water reduction targets and promoting to the public the importance of reducing water use. England's largest water and sewerage service provider is Thames Water. Thames Water supplies drinking water to 9 million customers in London and the Thames Valley, and loses 600m litres of water per day.

=== Infrastructure ===
No substantial reservoir has been built in England since the Kielder Water dam was built in 1981, despite the increase in demand.

=== Private water companies ===
Water was privatised in England by the Conservative government in 1989. Since then, one analysis concluded that the CEOs of England's water companies earned a total of £34m in 2020–2022.

=== Legislation ===
The Private Water Supplies (England) Regulations 2016 regulates all private water supplies and private distribution systems in England.

The Regulations aim to protect public health in England by:

- outlining the drinking water standards
- legislating a duty for compliance with the standards
- categorising and outlining the requirements of private water supplies

== Wales (since 2013) ==
=== Natural Resources Wales ===
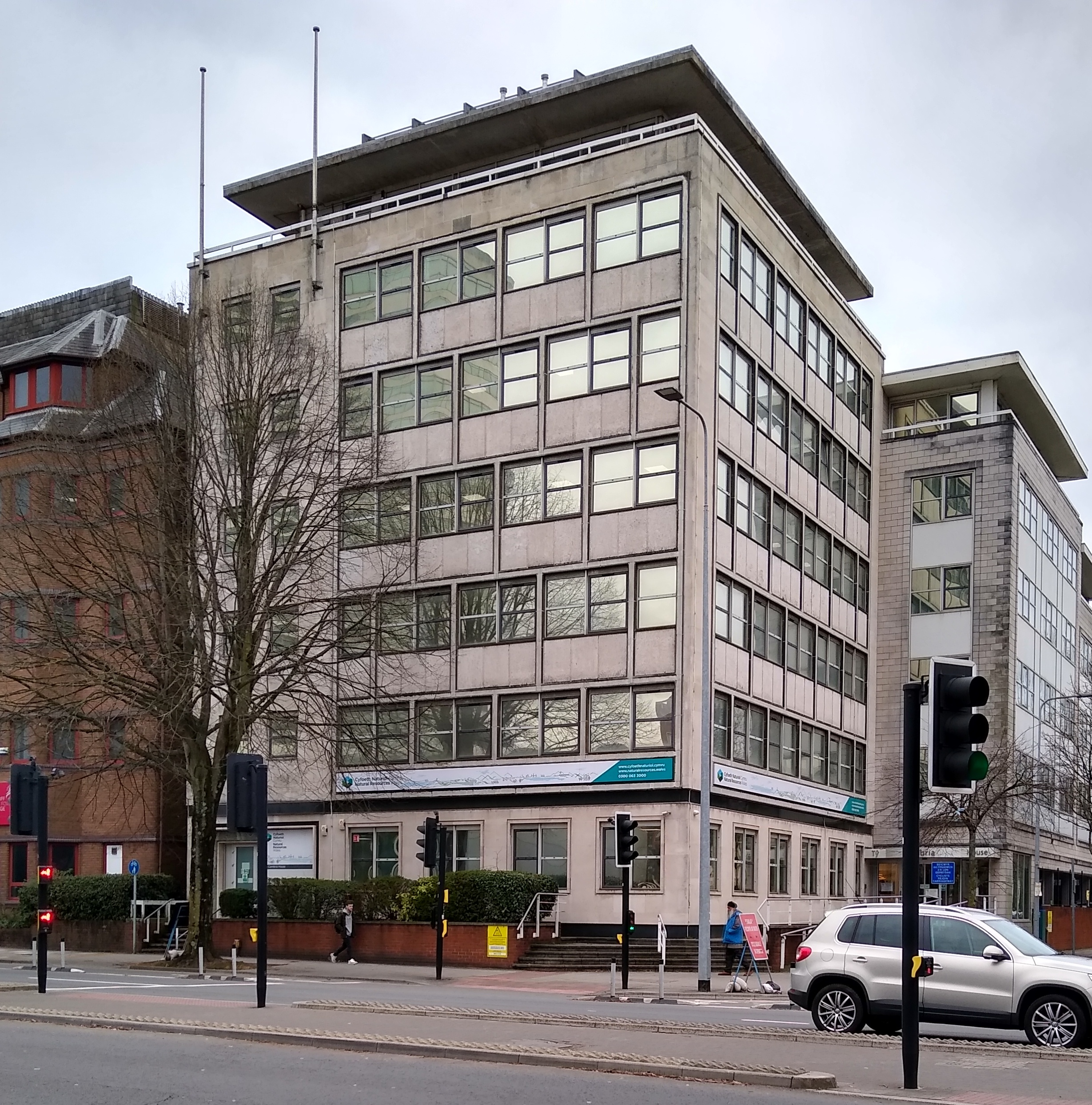
Natural Resources Wales building, Cardiff

On 1 April 2013, Natural Resources Wales took over the responsibilities of the Countryside Council for Wales, Environment Agency Wales and the Forestry Commission Wales. Since 2013, Natural Resources Wales states that it has established a standalone capability and has developed its own systems that are appropriate for Wales. Natural Resources Wales is now responsible for managing water resources in Wales and is the regulatory body for this purpose.

Water quality, water resources and river management are the responsibility of Natural Resources Wales. Issues relating to the water industry in general are devolved to the Senedd. This is however subject to the reservations in Schedule 7A to the Government of Wales Act 2006 (GoWA 2006).

=== Welsh Government ===
The Welsh Government is responsible for the strategic policy for water in Wales. This includes water companies entirely or mostly in Wales which are Dŵr Cymru and Hafren Dyfrdwy, Ofwat, Natural Resources Wales, the Drinking Water Inspectorate and local authorities.

The Welsh Ministers have functions in relation to any undertaker whose area is wholly or mainly in Wales."

The Welsh government has decided not to pursue deregulation of the water industry, except for large industrial users that consume over 50 million litres of water annually.

=== Devolution ===
The Government of Wales Act 2006 (GoWA 2006) devolved multiple water policy powers to the then Welsh Assembly. These powers included water supply, management of water resources including reservoirs, water quality, consumer representation, management of flood risk and coastal protection.

The GoWA 2006 was changed by the Wales Act 2017 which includes devolution of water and sewerage powers as recommended by the Silk Commission.

The secretary of state for Wales' intervention powers over cross-border water matters were repealed and replaced by the water protocol in 2018.

=== Supply ===
Dŵr Cymru Welsh Water is the water and sewerage company that supplies most of Wales and also supplies some bordering areas of England. Dŵr Cymru supplies over three million people. Since 2001, Dŵr Cymru has been owned by Glas Cymru, which is a one purpose company that manages and finances Dŵr Cymru as a "company limited by guarantee". It does not have any shareholders, and financial surpluses are reinvested into the company.

The areas of Wales that were previously served by Severn Trent and Dee Valley companies in north east Wales were merged after Dee Valley Water was bought by Severn Trent for £84 million in 2017. Hafren Dyfrdwy (owned by Severn Trent) replaced these areas in 2018 and is aligned with the Welsh national border, serving 115,000 people in Wales.

==== Supply to England ====
In total, up to 243 billion litres of water can be exported from Wales to England annually. Water from Elan Valley is exported to Birmingham, whilst water from Lake Vyrnwy is exported to Cheshire and Liverpool. Welsh Water is licensed to give 133 billion litres annually from Elan Valley reservoirs to Severn Trent customers. United Utilities is able to take up to 252 million litres daily from Lake Vyrnwy in Powys (owned by Severn Trent) and 50 million litres daily from the River Dee.

In 2022, John Armitt said that English water companies did not want to build new reservoirs which can be unpopular with communities. He added that Severn Trent (Hafren Dyfrdwy) and Thames Water were discussing exporting water from Wales to southern England, including water from Lake Vyurnwy exported via pipes or canal to the Thames basin.

In February 2023, Powys County Council announced plans to tax water exports to England. In 2023, Powys council said it had written to the Welsh Government and UK government about permission to raise tax on water exports to England. Jane Dodds, leader of the Welsh Liberal Democrats, stated that she was "totally behind" the council's proposal plans, adding that they are a "step in the right direction".

In March 2023, United Utilities, Severn Trent Water and Thames Water were reportedly planning new pipeline for export of up to 155million litres of water per day from Lake Vyrnwy in Powys to south east England.

==== Value ====
In 2022, Professor Roger Falconer from Cardiff University said that England should "pay for the water", with the revenue being invested back into local communities in Wales. He added, "We would supply directly under drought conditions to the south east of England and I would see this as the oil of Wales for the future in terms of revenue."

Former lecturer at Swansea University, John Ball has suggested that Welsh water exports to England is worth around £2bn annually. It has also been estimated that a low extraction fee of 0.1p per litre could generate £400 million for Wales.

=== State of Water (2022) ===
- All designated bathing waters in Wales except one met the Bathing Waters Directive standards in 2016
- 63% of freshwater water bodies did not reach the good or better overall status in 2015 (defined by the Water Framework Directive)
- Pollutants from metal mines have an impact on 700 kilometres of rivers in Wales with nine of the ten worst polluted catchments in the UK

=== Water industry ownership ===
The Welsh government has decided not to pursue deregulation of the water industry, except for large industrial users that consume over 50 million litres of water annually.

== See also ==
- EU water policy
- Northern Ireland Water
- United Kingdom water companies
- Water Framework Directive
- Water supply and sanitation in the United Kingdom

== See also ==
- United Kingdom water companies
