= Ian Byatt =

British economist

Sir Ian Charles Rayner Byatt (born 11 March 1932) is a British economist who was the Director General of the economic regulator of the water industry in England and Wales, Ofwat, from its creation at the time of the privatization of the water industry in 1989 until 2000.

== Education ==
He was educated at Kirkham Grammar School. He graduated from Oxford University, obtaining a doctorate with a thesis entitled The British electrical industry, 1875-1914 and Harvard University.

== Career ==
Ian Byatt was Head of Public Sector Economic Unit (1972–78) and then Deputy Chief Economic Adviser (1978–89) at Her Majesty's Treasury under Margaret Thatcher. Other posts included HM Treasury 1962-4; LSE 1964-7; Dept of Education and Science 1967-9; Ministry of Housing and Local Government 1969-70; DoE 1970-2; HM Treasury 1972-89; Central Council of Education 1965-6; CNAA 1968-70; ESCR 1983-9; HM Treasury 2000-2.

During his tenure as water regulator he was responsible for a substantial price reduction imposed on private water companies in 1999 that sent the share prices of these companies tumbling. Critics have also argued that instead of price cuts, it would have been better to fund improvements to the quality of water company discharges to rivers and the sea.

He then joined the newly created economic consulting firm Frontier Economics. From 2005 to 2011 he was the Chairman of the Water Industry Commission for Scotland, the economic regulator of the Scottish water industry. In 2012 he criticized the Thames Tideway Scheme as unnecessary and argued that private firms should not receive the massive subsidies they have requested to finance the scheme.

He was knighted in the 2000 Birthday Honours. Byatt is a member of the academic advisory council of the Global Warming Policy Foundation, a group which disputes the science behind global warming.

== Publications ==
The British electrical industry, 1875-1914: The economic returns to a new technology, Oxford University Press, Oxford, 1979, ISBN 978-0-19-828270-9.

He recently self-published a collection of articles on the regulation of water companies entitled A Regulator's Sign-off:Changing the Taps in Britain

== Personal life ==
He was born in Preston Lancashire, the son of Charles Rayner Byatt and Enid Marjorie Annie Byatt. He married the novelist A.S. Byatt (née Drabble) in Northumberland in 1959. They had two children: one girl and one boy. Ian and AS Byatt divorced in 1969. His second spouse is Professor Deirdre Annie Kelly on 12 December 1997 in Birmingham.
