= The Waterwise Project =

UK non-governmental organisation

Waterwise
- Founded: September 2005
- Type: Not-for-profit, non-governmental organisation
- Purpose: Sustainable water consumption and water efficiency
- Location: London, United Kingdom
- Method: Campaigning, influencing policy, research, consultancy
- Revenue: £300,000 (excluding projects, consultancy, and sponsorship)
- Website: www.waterwise.org.uk

The Waterwise Project is an independent not-for-profit, non-governmental organisation promoting water efficiency and conservation based in London, UK.

The organisation was initially focused on decreasing water consumption in the UK by 2010 and on building a robust evidence base for large-scale water efficiency projects. Waterwise is the UK’s water "efficiency champion" – "reaching the parts others cannot reach, and transform[ing] the concept of water resource efficiency into something compelling for consumers and business users."

== Founding and aims ==
Waterwise was established due to concerns of waters shortage and the upward trend in how much water is consumed in the UK. Factors that were taken into account were: current drought situation, geographical and climatological circumstances, consumer tendencies, available resources, and future prospects of supply. The following examples, situations, and comparisons were contemplated:

- England has less rainfall than some North African countries.
- Southern England has experienced one of the driest winters and spring periods since 1904
- Low river flows and groundwater levels across Southern England have resulted in environmental problems
- Groundwater levels are falling and this is particularly so in the chalk aquifers which are very important to Southern England.
- There have been demographic and social changes: modern lifestyles result in a greater demand for water. There has also been an increase in smaller size households that use proportionally more water.
- Climate and global warming, as predicted by the UKCIP, is forecast to result in a deficit in soil moisture. This means that agriculture will compete with the water industry for increasingly scarce resources.

In 2006, all 26 UK water companies decided to establish an independent organisation which would promote water efficiency. In September 2006, The Waterwise Project was launched to build an evidence base and economic case for water efficiency in the UK. In England, the organisation sits on the Environment Minister’s Water Saving Group, alongside the water industry and regulators.[4] It was established with the stance that the key to water efficiency is reducing waste, not restricting use.

Waterwise has an independent Board, which is drawn from the government, regulators, academia, business, other organisations, and from the water industry. The board meets four times a year and is responsible for overseeing Waterwise’s activities and its strategic direction.

Waterwise's initial remit ran until September 2010. It has been renewed for an additional five years. Its aim is to decrease per capita consumption in the UK, and to build a strong social, political, and economic case for water efficiency.

== Audience and partners ==
Waterwise is effectively a facilitator: its job is to enable, to promote dialogue, to establish a common evidence base and to develop partnerships and share ideas. Waterwise is keen to work with anyone who shares their aim and would welcome everyone’s help.

— Maria Adebowale, Board Chair of Waterwise, Founder Director of Capacity Global

Waterwise works with all sectors of society to promote water efficiency and the wise use of water. To achieve their aims they work with key partners in water companies, governments (local, regional, and national), regulators, farmers, communities, businesses, civil society organisations, manufacturers, retailers, press and media, and individual consumers.

== Activities and events ==
Waterwise participates in and leads various projects and events in order to complete their objectives:

- Waterwise hosts the only annual Water Efficiency Conference in the UK. The conference brings together policymakers, doers, and thinkers to learns about and further discuss issues related to water efficiency.
- Waterwise runs the Waterwise Recommended Checkmark. The Checkmark replaces the Marque, which was founded in October 2006 and first awarded in 2007. The Waterwise Recommended Checkmark provides consumers with an ‘at-a-glance’ indicator of a product’s water saving potential. It aims to empower consumers to make water wise purchases.
- Waterwise works closely with Government departments and regulators in developing policy to further water efficiency.
- Waterwise teams with UK water companies, universities, local governments, and builders to conduct large-scale water efficiency projects, workshops, and programmes. These projects range from water audits to domestic retrofit schemes to university lectures.
- Waterwise convenes The Saving Water in Scotland network which brings together key figures in Scotland to discuss and advance water efficiency.
- Waterwise also provides households, businesses, media, and the government with information on water in the UK and with assistance on water saving.
- Waterwise has ranked all current UK models of dishwashers and washing machines according to water efficiency. They are working on rankings for showers, toilets, and taps.
- Waterwise also conducts research related to international water ecolabels, embedded water, water and climate change, and other various other research projects.
- Waterwise is part of the Blueprint for Water coalition which has laid out a ten step plan for sustainable water. The coalition is composed of Waterwise, The Royal Society for the Protection of Birds (RSPB), World Wide Fund for Nature (WWF-UK), Salmon and Trout Association, The Wildlife Trusts, The National Trust, Association of Rivers Trust, Anglers’ Conservation Association, Wildfowl and Wetlands Trust, and The Fisheries and Angling Conservation Trust
- In 2017 Waterwise launched the Water Efficiency Strategy for the UK. Through setting out focused recommendations and actions, this strategy is providing a framework via which Waterwise and the wide Water Industry can drive even more ambitious water efficiency action and ensure future work is focused on key areas.

== See also ==
- Water conservation
- Water supply and sanitation in the United Kingdom
