= Marcic v Thames Water plc =

- Court: UK House of Lords
- Decided: 4th December 2003
- Citations: [2003] UKHL 66, [2004] 1 All ER 135

Court membership
- Judges sitting: Lord Nicholls of Birkenhead; Lord Steyn; Lord Hoffmann; Lord Hope of Craighead; Lord Scott of Foscote

Keywords
- Water

Marcic v Thames Water plc [2003] UKHL 66 is a UK enterprise law and English tort law case, concerning water in the UK.

== Facts ==
Mr Marcic’s property in Stanmore, 92 Old Church Lane, was repeatedly flooded with "foul water" and sewage after Thames Water plc failed to maintain the sewers: "two such incidents in 1992, one in each year from 1993 to 1996, two in 1997, none in 1998, four in 1999 and four or five in 2000." Repairs had not been made because they were not profitable, rather than a lack of resources. It was argued that the right to enjoyment of property in ECHR Protocol 1, article 1, was breached.

== Judgment ==
The House of Lords held the Water Industry Act 1991 duty to provide drainage is not absolute. It allows investments to be prioritised to benefit more customers. They rejected an argument that water companies were subject to human rights obligations. The appropriate means to enforce the duty was through Ofwat, not private law actions. Their Lordships also rejected a claim in nuisance, because a claim should go through judicial review of Ofwat. Lord Nicholls gave the first judgment. Lord Steyn agreed. Lord Hoffmann gave a second opinion, and said the following.

50. Thames Water has a statutory duty, under section 94(1) of the 1991 Act:

"(a) to provide, improve and extend such a system of public sewers (whether inside its area or elsewhere) and so to cleanse and maintain those sewers as to ensure that that area is and continues to be effectually drained; and

(b) to make provision for the emptying of those sewers and such further provision (whether inside its area or elsewhere) as is necessary from time to time for effectually dealing, by means of sewage disposal works or otherwise, with the contents of those sewers."

51. Mr Marcic, however, has not attempted to enforce this duty. The reason is that Chapter II of Part II of the 1991 Act contains an exclusive code for the enforcement of, among others, the duty under section 94(1). Putting it shortly, the only person who can in the first instance enforce the duty is the Director General of Water Services: section 18. He may make an "enforcement order", provisional or final, for the purpose of securing compliance. If an enforcement order is made, a failure to comply with the order is actionable at the suit of members of the public who thereby sustain loss or damage: section 22(1) and (2). Section 18(8) makes it clear that the statutory remedies are the only remedies available for an act or omission which constitutes a contravention of duties enforceable under section 18. So all that Mr Marcic could do by way of enforcement of the section 94(1) duty was to make a complaint to the Director, in which case it would be the duty of the Director to consider the complaint and take such steps, if any, as he thought appropriate: see section 30.

52. Mr Marcic chose not the avail himself of this route. Instead, he issued a writ claiming an injunction and damages for nuisance. Section 18(8) does not exclude any remedies "available in respect of [an] act or omission otherwise than by virtue of its constituting … a contravention [of a duty enforceable under section 18]." It follows that if the failure to improve the sewers to meet the increased demand gives rise to a cause of action at common law, it is not excluded by the statute. The question is whether there is such a cause of action.

53. The flooding has not been due to any failure on the part of Thames Water to clean and maintain the existing sewers. Nor are they responsible for the increased use. They have, as I have said, a statutory duty to accept whatever water and sewage the owners of property in their area choose to discharge. The omission relied upon by Mr Marcic as giving rise to an actionable nuisance is their failure to construct new sewers with a greater capacity.

54. Until the decision of the Court of Appeal in this case, there was a line of authority which laid down that the failure of a sewage authority to construct new sewers did not constitute an actionable nuisance. The only remedy was by way of enforcement of the statutory duty now contained in section 94(1) of the 1991 Act, previously contained in section 14 of the Public Health Act 1936 and before that in section 15 of the Public Health Act 1875. The earlier acts also had a special procedure for enforcement which the courts held to be exhaustive: see Robinson v Workington Corpn [1897] 1 QB 619. The existence of this procedure for the enforcement of statutory duties did not (any more than section 18(8) of the 1991 Act) exclude common law remedies for common law torts, such as a nuisance arising from failure to keep a sewer properly cleaned: Baron v Portslade Urban District Council [1900] 2 QB 588. But the courts consistently held that failure to construct new sewers was not such a nuisance.

55. The principal authorities for this last proposition were three cases in the late nineteenth century: Glossop v Heston and Isleworth Local Board (1879) 12 Ch D 102; Attorney General v Dorking Union Guardians (1882) 20 Ch D 595 and Robinson's case [1897] 1 QB 619, to which I have already referred, to which may be added Hesketh v Birmingham Corpn [1924] 1 KB 260 which followed Robinson's case. It is not necessary to examine them in detail because their effect was summed up with customary lucidity by Denning LJ in Pride of Derby and Derbyshire Angling Association Ltd v British Celanese Ltd [1953] Ch 149. This was an action for nuisance against a local authority for discharging insufficiently treated effluent into the river Derwent. Denning LJ said, at p 190, that the plaintiffs:

"have a perfectly good cause of action for nuisance, if they can show that the defendants created or continued the cause of the trouble; and it must be remembered that a person may 'continue' a nuisance by adopting it, or in some circumstances by omitting to remedy it: see Sedleigh-Denfield v O'Callaghan [1940] AC 880. This liability for nuisance has been applied in the past to sewage and drainage cases in this way: when a local authority take over or construct a sewage and drainage system which is adequate at the time to dispose of the sewage and surface water for their district, but which subsequently becomes inadequate owing to increased building which they cannot control, and for which they have no responsibility, they are not guilty of the ensuing nuisance. They obviously do not create it, nor do they continue it merely by doing nothing to enlarge or improve the system. The only remedy of the injured party is to complain to the Minister [of Health, under the 1936 Act enforcement procedure]."

56. This statement of law was followed a year later by Upjohn J in Smeaton v Ilford Corpn [1954] Ch 450, in which overloading caused the corporation's foul sewer to erupt through a manhole and discharge "deleterious and malodorous matter" into Mr Smeaton's garden. Upjohn J said, at pp 464-465:

"No doubt the defendant corporation are bound to provide and maintain the sewers (see section 14 of the Public Health Act 1936), but they are not thereby causing or adopting the nuisance. It is not the sewers that constitute the nuisance; it is the fact that they are overloaded. That overloading, however, arises not from any act of the defendant corporation but because, under section 34 of the Public Health Act 1936…they are bound to permit occupiers of premises to make connexions to the sewer and to discharge their sewage therein…Nor, in my judgment, can the defendant corporation be said to continue the nuisance, for they have no power to prevent the ingress of sewage into the sewer."

57. Mr Marcic can therefore have a cause of action in nuisance only if these authorities are no longer good law. The Court of Appeal decided that they should no longer be followed. They said that the earlier cases had been overtaken by developments in the concept of "adopting" or "continuing" a nuisance which enabled one to say, in appropriate circumstances, that a sewerage undertaker had a common law duty to lay new sewers in order to prevent overloaded old ones from flooding neighbouring properties.

58. The cases relied upon by the Court of Appeal are those in which it has been held that a land owner may have a duty to take positive steps to remove a source of nuisance which he did not himself create. The leading case is of course Sedleigh-Denfield v O'Callaghan [1940] AC 880, in which the potential source of the nuisance was created by a trespasser. Attempts to distinguish cases in which the damage arose from natural causes (lightning or natural weathering of rocks and soil) failed in Goldman v Hargrave [1967] 1 AC 645 and Leakey v National Trust for Places of Historic Interest or Natural Beauty [1980] QB 485. The present law is that, as Denning LJ said in the Pride of Derby case [1953] Ch 149, 190 by reference to the Sedleigh-Denfield case [1940] AC 880, "a person may 'continue' a nuisance by adopting it, or in some circumstances by omitting to remedy it".

59. The Court of Appeal in the present case took the view, at [2002] QB 929, 997, para 97, that the four cases upon which Denning LJ based his summary of the law were decided when "the law of nuisance drew a clear distinction between misfeasance and non-feasance". I find this statement surprising when one considers that Denning LJ went to considerable lengths in the Pride of Derby case [1953] Ch 149 to point out that there was no such distinction, citing (among other cases) Baron v Portslade Urban District Council [1900] 2 QB 588, in which a local authority had been held liable for omitting to clean a sewer. The much narrower proposition which, at p 190, Denning LJ thought was supported by the four cases was that a local authority does not continue a nuisance emanating from a sewer "merely by doing nothing to enlarge and improve the system". In other words, the four cases are not about general principles of the law of nuisance. They are cases about sewers.

60. The Court of Appeal said that since the four cases were decided, the law of nuisance had been "radically extended" by the Sedleigh-Denfield case [1940] AC 880. This case was of course cited by Denning LJ, but he does not seem to have thought that it undermined his statement of the law about the obligations of local authorities in respect of sewers. The Goldman case [1967] 1 AC 645 and the Leakey case [1980] QB 485 were said to have made a "significant extension" to the law. It is true that they rejected a distinction between acts of third parties and natural events which Lord Wilberforce said, in the Goldman case at p 661, was "well designed to introduce confusion into the law" and lacked "any logical foundation." Both cases also discussed in greater detail the extent of the duty to remedy a potential nuisance. Otherwise, however, they were applications of the Sedleigh-Denfield principle.

61. Why should sewers be different? If the Sedleigh-Denfield case [1940] AC 880 lays down a general principle that an owner of land has a duty to take reasonable steps to prevent a nuisance arising from a known source of hazard, even though he did not himself create it, why should that not require him to construct new sewers if the court thinks it would have been reasonable to do so?

62. The difference in my opinion is that the Sedleigh-Denfield, Goldman and Leakey cases were dealing with disputes between neighbouring land owners simply in their capacity as individual land owners. In such cases it is fair and efficient to impose reciprocal duties upon each landowner to take whatever steps are reasonable to prevent his land becoming a source of injury to his neighbour. Even then, the question of what measures should reasonably have been taken may not be uncomplicated. As Lord Wilberforce said in Goldman's case [1967] 1 AC 645, 663, the court must (unusually) have regard to the individual circumstances of the defendant. In Leakey's case [1980] QB 485, 526 Megaw LJ recoiled from the prospect of a detailed examination of the defendant's financial resources and said it should be done on a broad basis.

63. Nevertheless, whatever the difficulties, the court in such cases is performing its usual function of deciding what is reasonable as between the two parties to the action. But the exercise becomes very different when one is dealing with the capital expenditure of a statutory undertaking providing public utilities on a large scale. The matter is no longer confined to the parties to the action. If one customer is given a certain level of services, everyone in the same circumstances should receive the same level of services. So the effect of a decision about what it would be reasonable to expect a sewerage undertaker to do for the plaintiff is extrapolated across the country. This in turn raises questions of public interest. Capital expenditure on new sewers has to be financed; interest must be paid on borrowings and privatised undertakers must earn a reasonable return. This expenditure can be met only be charges paid by consumers. Is it in the public interest that they should have to pay more? And does expenditure on the particular improvements with which the plaintiff is concerned represent the best order of priorities?

64. These are decisions which courts are not equipped to make in ordinary litigation. It is therefore not surprising that for more than a century the question of whether more or better sewers should be constructed has been entrusted by Parliament to administrators rather than judges. Under the 1875 Act, the procedure for enforcement of the statutory duty, pursuant to section 15, to "cause to be made such sewers as may be necessary for effectually draining their district" was not very sophisticated. An aggrieved member of the public could complain to the Local Government Board which, if satisfied there had been a default, was required to make an order limiting the time for performance of the duty. If there was still default, the order could be enforced by mandamus or the Board could do the work itself and charge the local authority with the cost. Under section 322 of the Public Health Act 1936 the complaint was made to the Minister of Health who had a discretion whether to order a local inquiry and a power, if satisfied there had been a default, to make an order requiring the work to be done.

65. The enforcement procedure under the 1991 Act is much more elaborate. The Director has a duty under section 30(4) to consider a complaint and take such steps as he considers appropriate. He has a prima facie duty under section 18(1) to make an enforcement order if he is satisfied that the company is contravening its statutory duty. But that duty is qualified by section 19(1), which provides that he is not required to make an order if satisfied, among other things, that the company is willing to give suitable undertakings or that the duties imposed upon him by Part I of the Act preclude the making of such an order. His duties under Part I require him to exercise his powers in the manner best calculated to achieve certain objectives. The overriding objectives (section 2(2)) are to secure that the functions of a sewerage undertaker are properly carried out and that the undertakers are able "(in particular, by securing reasonable returns on their capital)" to finance the proper carrying out of their functions. More particular objectives are to protect the interests of customers liable to pay charges and promote economy and efficiency on the part of the company.

66. Pursuant to these duties, the Director has addressed himself to the question of flooding and formulated policies which the statutory undertakers should follow. Undertakers are required to submit a quinquennial strategic business plan which includes a statement of the capital expenditure required to achieve a reasonable level of alleviation of flooding. If the Director accepts such expenditure as reasonable, it is taken into account in assessing the charges which will give the undertaker a reasonable return on capital. Otherwise it is not. During the three quinquennia starting in 1990, the Director was willing to allow expenditure on work in relation to properties classified as at risk of internal flooding. But no allowance was made for properties, like that of Mr Marcic, which were only at risk of external flooding.

67. After the widespread floods of October 2000, the Director commissioned further studies of the flooding problem. In March 2002 he issued a consultation paper proposing a policy revision for the 2005-2010 quinquennium by which remedial work for properties only at risk of external flooding should also be included. He also made an interim agreement with Thames Water by which he approved additional investment before 2005 to free 250 properties (including that of Mr Marcic) from risk of external flooding. Your Lordships were told that this work has been done.

68. It is plain that the Court of Appeal, in deciding that better sewers should have been laid to serve Mr Marcic's property, was in no position to take into account the wider issues which Parliament requires the Director to consider. The judge, who heard fairly detailed evidence about what the cost of such improvements would be, confessed himself unable to decide whether the priorities laid down by the Director were fair or not:

"The system of priorities used by the defendant may be entirely fair, and I have no reason to doubt that it is intended to be. But its fairness in balancing the competing interests of the defendant's various customers must depend in part on the numbers in each class, the total costs involved in relation to each class, and the resources of the defendant. The answers to the questions raised above as matters for consideration might depend on the figures. If the exercise of assessing the fairness of the system were carried out, it might lead to the conclusion that for all its apparent faults, the system fell within the wide margin of discretion open to the defendant and the director. But on the limited evidence available to me, it is not possible to carry out such an exercise." ([2002] QB 929, 964, para 102)

69. As a result, the judge had to resort to deciding the matter upon the burden of proof: he said that the burden was upon Thames Water to satisfy him that it had done what was reasonable and that it had not done so. The judge said this in the context of whether Thames Water was in breach of its duty under section 6 of the Human Rights Act 1998, having previously decided that there was no cause of action in nuisance. But the Court of Appeal treated it, at p 995, para 87, as a finding that Thames Water had not taken reasonable steps to abate the nuisance emanating from its sewers: "Thames failed to persuade the judge that their system of priorities was a fair one."

70. My Lords, I think that this remark, together with the judge's frank admission that the fairness of the priorities adopted by Thames Water was not justiciable, provides the most powerful argument for rejecting the existence of a common law duty to build new sewers. The 1991 Act makes it even clearer than the earlier legislation that Parliament did not intend the fairness of priorities to be decided by a judge. It intended the decision to rest with the Director, subject only to judicial review. It would subvert the scheme of the 1991 Act if the courts were to impose upon the sewerage undertakers, on a case by case basis, a system of priorities which is different from that which the Director considers appropriate.

71. That leaves only the question of whether the remedies provided under the 1991 Act do not adequately safeguard Mr Marcic's Convention rights to the privacy of his home and the protection of his property. The judge, who found for Mr Marcic on this ground, did not have the benefit of the decision of the Grand Chamber of the European Court of Human Rights in Hatton v United Kingdom Application No 36022/97, (unreported) 8 July 2003. That decision makes it clear that the Convention does not accord absolute protection to property or even to residential premises. It requires a fair balance to be struck between the interests of persons whose homes and property are affected and the interests of other people, such as customers and the general public. National institutions, and particularly the national legislature, are accorded a broad discretion in choosing the solution appropriate to their own society or creating the machinery for doing so. There is no reason why Parliament should not entrust such decisions to an independent regulator such as the Director. He is a public authority within the meaning of the 1998 Act and has a duty to act in accordance with Convention rights. If (which there is no reason to suppose) he has exceeded the broad margin of discretion allowed by the Convention, Mr Marcic will have a remedy under section 6 of the 1998 Act. But that question is not before your Lordships. His case is that he has a Convention right to have the decision as to whether new sewers should be constructed made by a court in a private action for nuisance rather than by the Director in the exercise of his powers under the 1991 Act. In my opinion there is no such right.

Lord Hope gave another opinion.

Lord Scott agreed.

== See also ==
- United Kingdom enterprise law
- English tort law
