= R v Anglian Water Services Ltd =

UK enterprise law case

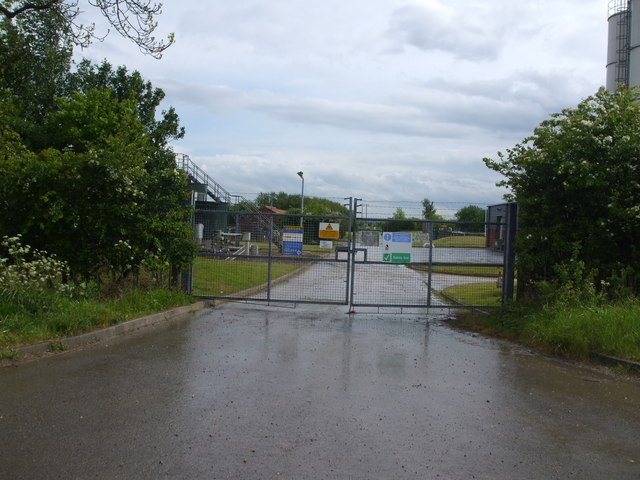
- Anglian Water treatment works
- Court: Court of Appeal
- Citation: [2003] EWCA Crim 2243

Keywords
- Water

R v Anglian Water Services Ltd [2003] EWCA Crim 2243 is a UK enterprise law case, concerning water in the UK.

== Facts ==
Anglian claimed it should not pay a £200k fine for causing sewage discharge into a river, under Water Resources Act 1991 section 85(3), causing serious fish and wildlife damage. It was found grossly irresponsible. It was argued the act was not criminal as section 85(3) required no mens rea, and Anglian argued it has no causative culpability. The company maintained a bolt whose thread broke was unforeseeable, so Anglian could not be at fault, and such a high fine would impact investment.

== Judgment ==
Scott Baker LJ held the fine was manifestly excessive for a single offence, and reduced it to £60k. Anglian acted promptly, had pleaded guilty and there was no concern of cutting corners. The fine had to be at a level to ensure it could not be cheaper to pay fines than to invest. Magistrates were always right to refuse jurisdiction for fines over £20k.

Henriques J and Recorder of Bristol agreed.

== See also ==
- United Kingdom enterprise law
