= United Kingdom water companies =

British water and sanitation suppliers

United Kingdom water and sewerage companies
- Water only suppliers not shown

Water supply and sanitation in the United Kingdom is provided by a number of water and sewerage companies. Twelve companies and organisations provide drainage and sewerage services, each over a wide area, to the whole United Kingdom; and supply water to most customers in their areas of operation. There are also 'water only' companies which supply water in certain areas. Some companies are licensed to supply water or sewerage services using the networks of other providers.

== England ==
In England and Wales the economic regulator of water and sewerage is Ofwat and the quality regulator is the Drinking Water Inspectorate.

=== Water and sewerage ===
Company	Service area	Major shareholders	Website
Anglian Water	East of England	Camulodunum Investments (15%), CPP Investments (33%), IFM Investors (20%), Igneo Infrastructure Partners (15%), Infinity Investments (17%)	Official website
Northumbrian Water	North East England	Northumbrian Water Group	Official website
Severn Trent Water	West Midlands, East Midlands, Chester	As at 1 March 2017, the company's issued share capital consists of 239,791,170 ordinary shares of 97 17/19 pence each with voting rights. As at 1 March 2017, the company holds 4,080,964 shares in Treasury. Listed on London Stock Exchange)	Official website
Southern Water	South East England	Greensands Holdings	Official website
South West Water	South West England	Pennon Group	Official website
Thames Water	Greater London, Thames Valley	Kemble Water	Official website
United Utilities	North West England	N/A, listed on London Stock Exchange	Official website
Dŵr Cymru	West Midlands, (Wales)	Glas Cymru Holdings	Official website
Wessex Water	South West England	YTL Corporation	Official website
Yorkshire Water	Yorkshire and the Humber	Kelda Group	Official website

=== Water only ===
Company	Supply area	Owner	Website
Affinity Water	Central region: Amersham, Barnet, Beaconsfield, Bishop's Stortford, Harlow, Harrow, Hemel Hempstead, Letchworth, Luton, Saffron Walden, St Albans, Staines, Stevenage, Uxbridge, Watford, Welwyn Garden City, Woking; East region: Brightlingsea, Clacton-on-Sea, Frinton-on-Sea, Harwich, Manningtree, Wivenhoe; Southeast region: Dover, Folkestone, Hythe, Romney Marsh, Dungeness, Lydd	Allianz/HICL Infrastructure/DIF Tamblin	Official website
Albion Water	Knowle Village (Hampshire), Oaklands Hamlet (Chigwell), Upper Rissington (Gloucestershire)	Albion Water Group Limited	Official website
Bournemouth Water	Bournemouth, Christchurch, Lymington, Ringwood, Verwood, Wimborne Minster	Pennon Group	Official website
Bristol Water	Bristol, Burnham-on-Sea, Frome, Tetbury, Wells, Weston-super-Mare	Pennon Group	Official website
Cambridge Water Company	Cambridge, St Ives	South Staffordshire Water	Official website
Cholderton and District Water Company	Amport, Bulford, Cholderton, Quarley, Shipton Bellinger, Thruxton	Cholderton Estate	Official website
Essex and Suffolk Water	Essex region: Basildon, Brentwood, Chelmsford, Southend-on-Sea, Thurrock, Barking and Dagenham, Havering, Redbridge; Suffolk region: Aldeburgh, Eye, Great Yarmouth, Lowestoft, Southwold	Northumbrian Water Group	Official website
Hartlepool Water	Hartlepool	Anglian Water	Official website
Portsmouth Water	Bognor Regis, Chichester, Fareham, Gosport, Havant, Hayling Island, Portsmouth	Ancala	
South East Water	Eastern region: Ashford, Canterbury, Eastbourne, East Grinstead, Haywards Heath, Maidstone, Sevenoaks, Tonbridge, Royal Tunbridge Wells, Whitstable; Western region: Aldershot, Basingstoke, Bracknell, Camberley, Maidenhead, Petersfield, Wokingham	Utilities Trust of Australia/Desjardins Group/NatWest Group Pension Fund	
South Staffordshire Water	Aldridge, Brownhills, Burton upon Trent, Cannock, Kinver, Lichfield, Rugeley, Sutton Coldfield, Tamworth, Uttoxeter, Walsall, West Bromwich	Independent	
Sutton and East Surrey Water	Cobham, Dorking, Horley, Leatherhead, Oxted, Redhill, Reigate, Sutton	Pennon Group	
Youlgrave Waterworks	Youlgrave	Independent non-profit	Official website

== Wales ==
Company	Service area	Parent	Website
Dŵr Cymru	Wales, (West Midlands)	Glas Cymru	Official website
Hafren Dyfrdwy	Wrexham, Powys	Severn Trent	Official website

== Scotland ==
- Scottish Water (government)

Business users receive the services via a licensed provider and Scottish Water act as wholesaler.

== Northern Ireland ==
- Northern Ireland Water (government)

== Crown dependencies ==
- Jersey Water (government, with minority private shareholding)
- Guernsey Water (government)
- Manx Utilities Authority (government)
