= 1994 Strathclyde water referendum =

Water privatisation referendum in Scotland

March 1994
- Do you agree with the government's proposal for the future of water and sewerage services?
- Strathclyde, Scotland

Results
Choice	Votes	%
Yes	33,956	2.76%
No	1,194,667	97.24%
Valid votes	1,228,623	99.86%
Invalid or blank votes	1,705	0.14%
Total votes	1,230,328	100.00%
Registered voters/turnout	1,720,940	71.49%

In 1994, the ruling Conservative Government of the United Kingdom brought forward plans to overhaul a number of aspects of local government in Scotland as part of the Local Government etc. (Scotland) Act 1994. Part II of the Act reorganised Scotland's water supply and sewerage services, previously the responsibility of regional councils. Three water authorities were established: East of Scotland Water; West of Scotland Water; and North of Scotland Water. The main reason for this reorganisation was to prepare for the privatisation of water services, to bring Scotland into line with the rest of the UK. The water authorities in England and Wales had been privatised in 1989. However, public opinion was strongly against such a move, with successive polls showing 86–91% of people definitely opposed.

== Referendum ==
In March 1994 Strathclyde Regional Council held a postal referendum of Strathclyde residents on whether control of water and sewerage services should be privatised. Seven out of ten voters returned papers, a total of 1.2 million people, of whom 97% voted against privatisation.

NO vote	YES vote
1,194,667	33,956

NO : 1,194,667 (97%)	YES : 33,956 (3%)
▲

Turnout	Total votes cast
70%	1,228,623

== Aftermath ==
With mounting disagreement with plans the policy was dropped, and the three Scottish Water Authorities were kept in public hands. In 2002 all three were merged to create Scottish Water, a publicly owned water authority of the Scottish Government in the post-devolution era.
