= Sewage discharge in the United Kingdom =

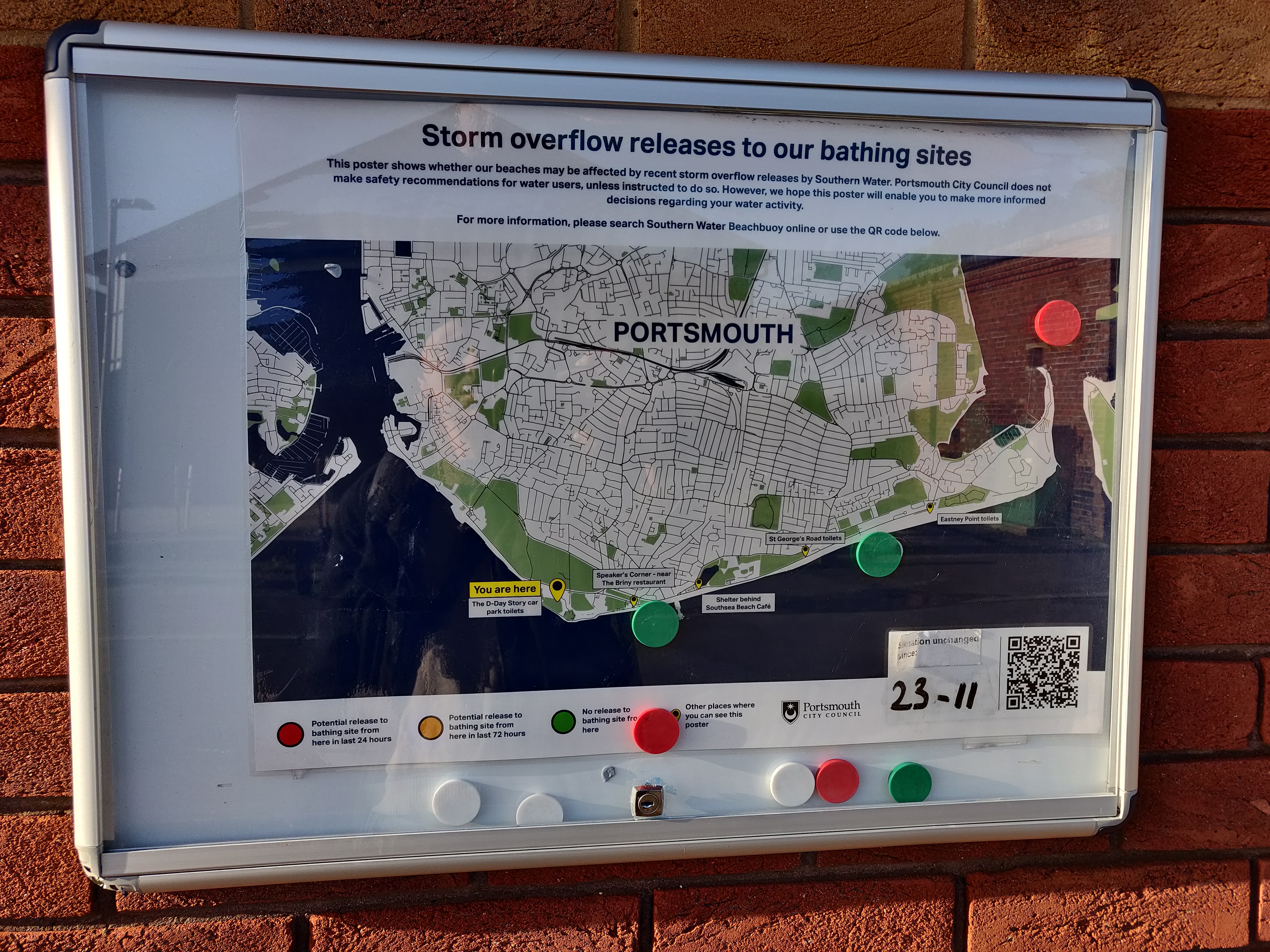
A December 2023 pollution warning in Portsmouth following overflow releases by Southern Water

The issue of sewage discharge in the United Kingdom has attracted legal, media and political attention. UK water companies periodically release sewage into rivers and coastal waters, leading to health warnings on recreational beaches. This is permitted during heavy rainfall as the sewage system exceeds capacity, but some companies have been suspected of illegally dumping on dry days. The Environment Agency subsequently launched criminal investigations into several companies. The introduction of stricter legislation has been debated in parliament. Southern Water was fined £90m in 2021 and Thames Water was fined £3.4m in 2023 for illegal dumping.

== Sewage discharge ==
The UK has a combined sewage system, meaning rainwater and wastewater are discharged through the same pipes. During heavy rainfall, this system's capacity can be exceeded, leading to water companies discharging sewage into rivers and lakes. Some water companies also have been suspected of illegally discharging on dry days. Sewage discharge has led to health warnings at popular recreational beaches.

According to unpublished data presented to the high court, raw sewage was released 372,533 times over 2.7 million hours in 2021 and 301,000 times over 1.75 million hours in 2022.

In 2025, a report by the Campaign for National Parks and The Rivers Trust found that rivers in national parks were on average more polluted by sewage and farm runoff than other rivers, in part because sewage treatment works for fewer than 2,000 people, more common in national parks, were only required to perform basic treatment which does not remove organic matter.

== Investigations and industry responses ==
In 2021, Southern Water pled guilty and was fined £90m, a record amount, for "deliberately dumping raw sewage" into the ocean because it was cheaper than treating it. Between 2010 and 2015, Southern Water illegally released sewage on 6,971 occasions at 17 sites in Hampshire, Kent and West Sussex. The investigation was the biggest undertaken by the Environment Agency in its history.

In 2023, Water UK, the industry body, issued an apology for sewage discharge and announced a £10bn plan to modernise the Victorian-era sewage system, whilst Thames Water was fined £3.4m. The Environment Agency also launched a criminal investigation into all water companies.

In August 2024, Ofwat, the British regulator for the water and sewerage industry, put forward a proposal to fine £168m Thames Water, Yorkshire Water and Northumbrian Water because they released sewage too early ahead of heavy rain falls.

== Political responses ==
In 2022, a proposed amendment to the Environment Bill was defeated 265 to 202 votes by members of parliament. This change would have made explicit that water companies must ensure raw sewage is not discharged. In April 2023, Shadow Secretary of State for Environment, Food and Rural Affairs Jim McMahon from the Labour Party pushed for a debate and vote in the House of Commons for a proposed Water Quality (Sewage Discharge) Bill, which would introduce automatic fines to water companies for the practice. The bill failed to garner support from the Conservative Party.

The Labour government is currently planning new legislation to address the proposal of Ofwat.

== See also ==
- Environmental issues in the United Kingdom
- Thames Water
- Surface Water - Clean Water Campaign
