= Water privatisation in England and Wales =

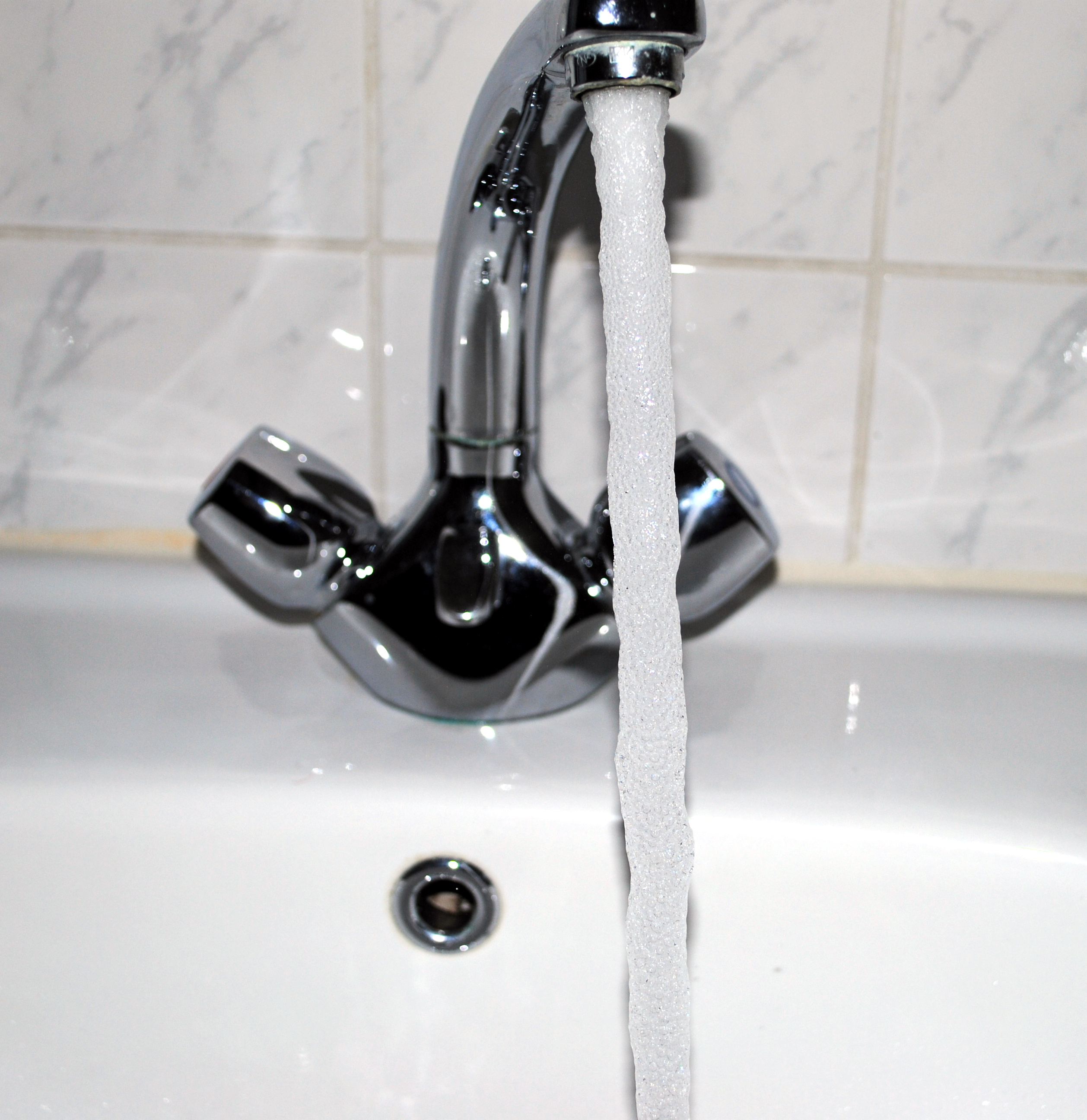
Until the 1980s, universal provision of drinking water and sewerage services in England and Wales was considered a public health service. The water industry was privatised in 1989, according to the Conservative government's programme.

The water privatisation in England and Wales involved the transfer of the provision of water and wastewater services in England and Wales from the state to the private sector in 1989, through the sale of the ten regional water authorities (RWA). The potable water supply as well as the sewerage and sewage disposal functions of each RWA were transferred to privately owned companies.

== Background ==
At the beginning of the 19th century, most water works in the UK were built, owned, and operated by private companies. The introduction of various parliamentary regulations led to the government assuming control of the industry, with the responsibility for most (but not all) water works and sewerage systems being passed to local government by the beginning of the 20th century. One of the earliest proponents for the nationalisation of the water supply and sewerage (WSS) system was Joseph Chamberlain, who argued in 1884 that "It is difficult, if not impossible to combine the citizens' rights and interests and the private enterprise's interests, because the private enterprise aims at its natural and justified objective, the biggest possible profit." (Note: A century later, the same argument was made in the case against privatisation by Sir Geoffrey Chandler, a former senior Shell executive and a champion of corporate social responsibility, who wrote in The Times in 1989: "Anxiety must be heightened by the fact that the company law under whose regime these activities, once privatised, will come imposes a legal obligation solely to the shareholder.")

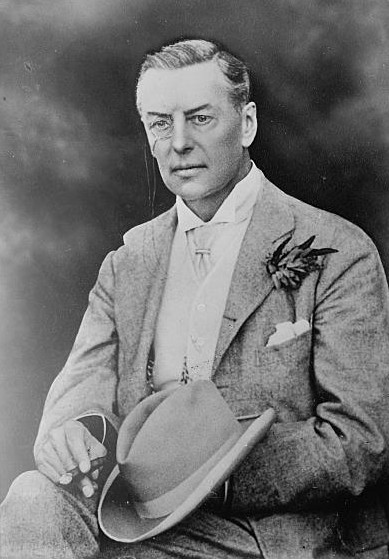
Joseph Chamberlain (1909)

Water was considered a public health necessity—rather than a commodity—and potable water was supplied "with the goal of universal provision [priced] on a concept of social equity: household supply was not metered, and bills were linked to property value". Local government subsequently maintained responsibility for most water supply and all wastewater services—assisted by central government subsidies—until 1974, when the ten regional water authorities (RWAs) were created, through Geoffrey Rippon's Water Act 1973 under Edward Heath's Conservative government.

These regional water authorities took over the supply of water from 165 of the 198 statutory water-supply undertakings, entities that included 64 local authorities, 101 joint water boards of groups of local authorities acting as separate legal entities. The 33 private companies were left in place. Sewerage and sewage disposal had been dealt with by more than 1,300 county borough and district councils. Daniel A. Okun, an environmental engineer and internationally renowned figure in the field of water supply and water resources management, regarded the RWAs as "pioneers of their era". This "trailblazing" concept of a single authority, based on a river basin or watershed, being responsible for water extraction, water supply, sewage treatment and environmental pollution prevention, led to "considerable efficiency gains". Despite these efficiency gains, the RWAs were hampered by chronic underfunding and lack of investment from central government. Underinvestment in infrastructure combined with sustained water pollution by industry contributed to a continued decline of both river and tap water quality.

By 1980, investment in the water sector was just one-third of what it had been in 1970. Margaret Thatcher's Conservative government, which had been elected in 1979, had curtailed the RWAs' ability to borrow money they deemed necessary for capital projects. Daniel Okun said: "Before, they could borrow money everywhere easily. They could get money at very good rates. Restrictions on external borrowing prevented the [RWAs] from getting capital. They were considered ineffective because they could not borrow money. Thatcher prevented them from borrowing and then blamed them for not building." When the European Union introduced stricter legislation on river, bathing, coastal, and drinking water quality, the sector was in no position to meet the expenditure requirements and the UK was prosecuted for noncompliance. (Note: The UK was prosecuted in the European Court of Justice for its failure to implement the 1980 EU Drinking Water Quality Directive and the 1976 Bathing Water Directive by the 1985 deadline.) Estimates of the capital expenditure required to achieve EU standards and meet the existing backlog in infrastructure maintenance ranged from £24 to £30 billion.

== Process ==
The Conservative government of the day had originally proposed water privatisation in 1984 and again in 1986, but strong public feeling against the proposals led to plans being shelved to prevent the issue influencing the 1987 general election. Having won the election, the privatisation plan was "resurrected and implemented rapidly".

The newly created, privately owned, water and sewerage companies (WSCs) paid £7.6 billion for the regional water authorities. At the same time, the government assumed responsibility for the sector's total debts amounting to £5 billion and granted the WSCs a further £1.5 billion—a so-called "green dowry"—of public funds.

The ten privatised regional water authorities were:

- Anglian Water (previously Anglian Water Authority)
- Dŵr Cymru Welsh Water (previously Welsh Water Authority)
- North West Water (previously North West Water Authority)
- Northumbrian Water (previously Northumbrian Water Authority)
- Severn Trent Water (previously Severn Trent Water Authority)
- Southern Water (previously Southern Water Authority)
- South West Water (previously South West Water Authority)
- Thames Water (previously Thames Water Authority)
- Wessex Water (previously Wessex Water Authority)
- Yorkshire Water (previously Yorkshire Water Authority)

The process of privatisation also created three new regulatory bodies:

- the Drinking Water Inspectorate (DWI), responsible for monitoring potable water quality;
- the National Rivers Authority (now the Environment Agency and Natural Resources Wales), responsible for monitoring river and environmental pollution, flood risk management on major rivers, freshwater fisheries, water resource management and conservation of the natural environment; and
- the Water Services Regulation Authority, or Ofwat, responsible for setting the price regime that water companies are required to follow and monitoring performance of the new water companies.

== Impact ==
England and Wales became the only countries in the world to have a fully privatised water and sewage disposal system. In Scotland and Northern Ireland, water and sewerage services remained in public ownership. Since 2001, Dŵr Cymru Welsh Water, the company which supplies drinking water and wastewater services to most of Wales and parts of western England, has operated as a single-purpose, not-for-profit company with no shareholders, "run solely for the benefit of customers". According to The Independent, the English WSCs are now mostly owned "by private equity firms with controversial tax-avoidance strategies". Public opinion polling carried out in 2017 indicated that 83% of the British public favoured renationalisation of all water services.

In the same year, research by the University of Greenwich suggested that consumers in England were paying £2.3 billion more every year for their water and sewerage bills than they would if the water companies had remained under state ownership.

By 2024, the rise in inflation and interest rates left several water companies with unsustainable debt loads. Water companies sharply increased bills, with several proposed increases being rejected by Ofwat despite claims that they were necessary to keep companies solvent. In response, academics have criticised the privatisation of water for allowing too much debt to be taken on by companies that have significant amounts of private equity among their investors.

== Environmental justice and public concerns ==
Water privatization in England and Wales has been increasingly examined through the lens of environmental justice, focusing on who bears the social and ecological costs of privatized water governance and who benefits from it. Since privatization in 1989, water bills have consistently risen above inflation, Ofwat's 2025 survey reveals that 20% of customers struggle to pay for water and nearly half report occasional difficulty meeting household bills. This pattern reflects distributive injustice, in which the economic and environmental costs of maintaining infrastructure and pollution control fall most heavily on vulnerable groups while private shareholders capture substantial dividends.

Beyond affordability, procedural and recognition justice concerns arise from limited opportunities for public participation in water governance. Decisions about pricing, infrastructure investment, and pollution management are largely determined by regulators and corporate boards, leaving affected communities with little influence. The 2021 systematic review highlights that justice principles–distributive, procedural, recognition, and capability–remain weakly embedded in English water infrastructure planning. The study argues that justice provides a framework for confronting "winners and losers" in infrastructure decisions, offering a path to move beyond sustainability toward equitable governance.

Environmental burdens further intensify these inequalities. In 2023, England's major water companies discharged untreated sewage for roughly 3.6 million hours, with many incidents concentrated in rural and economically disadvantaged communities. These conditions underscore that environmental injustice in the English water sector is both social and spatial: those with the least political power experience higher exposure to ecological degradation while having the least voice in remediation. Responding to these imbalances, advocacy groups such as We Own It have advanced justice-based claims for remunicipalization and the recognition of water as a public right and common goods, rather than a market commodity.

== Camelford disaster ==
Campaigners alleged that there was a cover-up of the 1988 Camelford water pollution incident because prosecution would have had a negative effect on the privatisation process. A contemporary confidential memo—later obtained under the Freedom of Information Act—from a senior civil servant to the then Minister of State for the Environment, Michael Howard, warned: "Those of the South West Board with a commercial background are deeply concerned by the investigation. They see the timing of any prosecution of the authority as being totally unhelpful to privatisation, while the prosecution of a board member in their view could render the whole of the water industry unattractive to the City."

In March 2012, delivering a narrative verdict on the death of Camelford resident Carole Cross, Michael Rose, the Coroner for West Somerset, stated that he harboured the "deepest suspicion" that the true nature of the 1988 disaster was "not revealed immediately because the water industry was being privatised," adding that there was a "deliberate policy not to advise the public of the true nature [of the disaster] until some 16 days after the occurrence of the incident."

== See also ==
- Water supply and sanitation in England and Wales
- Asset management plan period
- Thatcherism

== Notes and references ==
Notes

Bibliography

- Bakker, Karen (2005), "Neoliberalizing Nature? Market Environmentalism in Water Supply in England and Wales", Annals of the Association of American Geographers, 95 (3): 542–565, Bibcode:2005AAAG...95..542B, doi:10.1111/j.1467-8306.2005.00474.x, S2CID 144211707
- Bakker, Karen J. (2001), "Paying for Water: Water Pricing and Equity in England and Wales", Transactions of the Institute of British Geographers, 26 (2): 143–164, Bibcode:2001TrIBG..26..143B, doi:10.1111/1475-5661.00012
- Hassan, John (1998), A History of Water in Modern England and Wales, Manchester: Manchester University Press, ISBN 978-0-719-04308-6
- Heynen, Nik; McCarthy, James; Prudham, Scott; Robbins, Paul (2007), Neoliberal Environments: False Promises and Unnatural Consequences, Abingdon: Routledge, ISBN 978-0-415-77149-8
- Howes, Rupert; Skea, Jim; Whelan, Bob (1997), Clean and Competitive: Motivating Environmental Performance in Industry, Abingdon: Routledge, ISBN 978-1-853-83490-5
- Hukka, J.J.; Katko, T.S. (2003), Water Privatisation Revisited: Panacea or Pancake?, Delft: IRC International Water and Sanitation Centre
- Jordan, A. G.; Richardson, J.J; Kimber, R.H. (September 1977). "The Origins of the Water Act of 1973". Public Administration. 5 (3): 317–334. doi:10.1111/j.1467-9299.1977.tb00292.x.
- Juuti, Petri S.; Katko, Tapio S.; Vuorinen, Heikki S. (2007), Environmental History of Water: Global Views on Community Water Supply and Sanitation, London: IWA Publishing, ISBN 978-1-843-39110-4
- Lobina, Emanuele; Hall, David (2001), UK Water privatisation – a briefing, London: Public Services International Research Unit
- Ratnayaka, Don D.; Brandt, Malcolm J.; Johnson, Michael (2009), Twort's Water Supply (6th ed.), Oxford: Butterworth-Heinemann, ISBN 978-0-750-66843-9
