= Dŵr Cymru Welsh Water =

Public utility company in Wales

Dŵr Cymru Cyfyngedig
- Type: private limited company (Cyfyngedig)
- Industry: Public Utility
- Founded: 1989
- Headquarters: Cardiff, Wales
- Key people: Roch Cheroux, Chief Executive
- Products: Water and Wastewater Services
- Revenue: £779 million
- Number of employees: 3,514
- Parent: Glas Cymru Holdings Cyfngedig
- Website: www.dwrcymru.com

Dŵr Cymru Cyfyngedig, more commonly referred to by its English name Welsh Water or bilingually Dŵr Cymru Welsh Water, is a private company, ultimately owned by non-profit Glas Cymru Holdings, which supplies drinking water and wastewater services to most of Wales and parts of western England that border Wales. In total, it serves around 1.4 million households and businesses and over three million people - and supplies nearly 830 million litres (180 million imperial gallons) of drinking water per day.

It is regulated under the Water Industry Act 1991 as amended by the Water Act 2014.

== History ==
Welsh Water originated from the privatisation in 1989 of the water supply and waste water arms of the Welsh Water Authority, which itself had its origins in the Welsh National Water Development Authority that was created by the 1973 restructuring of the water industry in England and Wales.

The Welsh Water Authority was privatised by stock market flotation in 1989, along with the other nine regional water authorities, which provided the company with a substantial cash surplus for some years, which it used to diversify in a wide range of sectors including leisure (hotels, fishing etc.). It renamed itself Hyder in 1996 after taking over a local electricity company (SWALEC) and becoming a water and electricity multi-utility.

However, in 1999/2000, following the windfall tax on utility profits and the 1999 Ofwat price review, Hyder got into financial difficulties which led to its breakup following a takeover battle. Western Power Distribution purchased Hyder on 15 September 2000 with a view to acquiring its electricity distribution business, and rapidly sold off Hyder's other assets. Dŵr Cymru Welsh Water was sold, along with £1.85 billion of Hyder debt, for £1 by WPD to Glas Cymru, a company set up by Nigel Annett and Chris Jones with the support of the company's first chairman Lord Burns to run the company for public benefit. Under the terms of its licence, Glas Cymru, a company limited by guarantee, may not operate in sectors other than water.

== Business ==
Measured by turnover, Welsh Water is the fifth-largest company based in Wales and employs more than 3,500 people.

Its asset base is valued at more than £26 billion - and includes:

- Maintaining over 26,500 km of water mains
- Over 36,000 km of sewers
- Managing over 830 wastewater treatment works
- Analysing more than 600,000 tests a year sampling drinking water
- Looking after 92 reservoirs

== Coverage ==
In general, it provides services and operates across Wales from the catchments of the River Dee, River Clwyd in the north, round to the River Usk and River Wye in the south, and everything to the west of these catchments. This means that it includes part of the Wirral and Cheshire, and also parts of Gloucestershire, and Herefordshire, particularly Hereford.

It excludes those areas supplied by private water utilities such as Hafren Dyfrdwy which operates in the River Dee catchment supplying parts of north east and mid Wales. Hafren Dyfrdwy was formed from parts of the Dee Valley Water business, which is now a subsidiary of Severn Trent plc, and runs its operations in Wales. It also excludes any area of Wales drained by the River Severn, which are currently served by Hafren Dyfrdwy, after Severn Trent combined all of its coverage areas in Wales with the Welsh parts of Dee Valley Water, following its takeover of that company.

== Not-for-profit status ==
In 2001, Welsh Water became a not-for-profit organisation with no shareholders. This differentiates it from all the water companies operating in England which are run for the financial benefit of the private entities that own, with capital regularly removed as dividend, as well as from the organisational status of water utilities in Scotland and the pre-privatisation water supply undertakings in England, which are or were directly accountable to the government.

Under Glas Cymru's ownership, the company's assets and capital investment are financed by bonds and retained financial surpluses. The Glas Cymru business model aims to reduce Welsh Water's asset financing cost, the water industry’s single biggest cost. Financing efficiency savings to date have largely been used to build up reserves to insulate Welsh Water and its customers from any unexpected costs and also to improve credit quality. As of 2019, the company has the strongest credit ratings among the England and Wales-based water and sewerage companies Water industry.

When it was established as a not-for-profit company, Welsh Water had a gearing level (the ratio of net debt to Regulatory Capital Value) of around 93%. The company has reduced this level to 58% in 2021–2022.

== Not-for-profit 'dividends' ==
Part of Welsh Water's not-for-profit model means any surplus money is reinvested back into the business or into customer services, or to reduce customer bills. To date, around £450 million has been reinvested in such ways.

== Visitor attractions and reservoirs ==
Welsh Water owns more than 90 dams and reservoirs across its areas of operation - including a number of flagship visitor attractions. These generally provide access to the reservoir and surrounding land, but also provide visitor centres, leisure facilities, walking routes, and cafes. Their main visitor attraction sites are:

- Elan Valley Reservoirs, in Mid Wales
- Llandegfedd Reservoir, near Pontypool
- Llyn Brenig, in Cerrigydrudion, Conwy
- Llys y Fran, on the southern slopes of the Preseli Mountains in Pembrokeshire
- Llanishen Reservoir and Lisvane Reservoir, Wenault Reservoir, Cardiff
- Ynys-y-fro Reservoir , in Rogerstone

== Controversies ==
=== £40m regulatory intervention ===
In March 2024, the water industry's economic regulator Ofwat ordered Welsh Water to pay £40m to benefit its customers upon concluding that the firm had "misled customers and regulators on its performance on leakage and per capita consumption".
