= Drinking Water Directive 2020 =

EU directive

The Drinking Water Directive 2020 (2020/2184) is an EU law that protects the quality of drinking water and forms part of the regulation of water supply and sanitation in the European Union.

== Contents ==
The Directive is intended to protect human health by laying down healthiness and purity requirements which must be met by drinking water within the Community (see water quality). Articles 1 and 2 make clear the goal is wholesome and clean water as ‘intended for human consumption’, for instance in drinking, cooking, and for food. Article 4 contains the general obligation for drinking water to be ‘wholesome and clean’ and (a) free from any micro-organisms and parasites dangerous to health, and comply with Annex I (microbiological and chemical parameters and those relating to radioactivity). It also requires member states will take any other action needed in order to guarantee the healthiness and purity of water intended for human consumption.

It requires Member States to regularly report on the quality of drinking water to the European Commission and the public. It applies to all water intended for human consumption apart from natural mineral waters and waters which are medicinal products.

In setting contaminant levels the directive applies the precautionary principle. For example, the EU contaminant levels for pesticides are up to 20 times lower than those in the WHO drinking water guidelines, because the EU directive not only aims at protecting human health but also the environment. The WHO contaminant levels themselves are already set so that there would be no potential risk if the contaminant was absorbed continuously over a person's lifetime. EU drinking water standards and cases where these standards are temporarily exceeded by a small margin should be interpreted in this context.

Articles 8 to 13 set out requirements on member states to regularly monitor the quality of water intended for human consumption by using the methods of analysis specified in the directive, or equivalent methods. Member states also have to publish drinking water quality reports every three years, and the European Commission is to publish a summary report. Within five years Member States had to comply with the Directive. Exemptions can be granted on a temporary basis, provided that they do not affect human health.

The Annex lists chemical and organic measures of purity.

== Previous versions ==
With effect from December 2003, Directive 80/778/EC was repealed and replaced by 98/83/EC. The new directive saw the number of parameters reduced whilst allowing member to add parameters such as magnesium, total hardness, phenols, zinc, phosphate, calcium and chlorite.

== Implementation challenges ==
Until 2006 the European Commission has not published a summary report on drinking water quality. No EU country achieves full compliance with the directive, mainly because of the geological nature of its soil and agricultural activity. In 2003 the European Commission initiated a broad consultation process to prepare a revision of the Directive. One key aspect of the revision would be to move away from a pure end-of-pipe standard setting approach. Instead the whole water supply process from the basin to the tap would be assessed to identify risk and the most effective control points, through so-called water safety plans.

== Directive update ==
=== 2020 revision ===
The Commission proposed to update the existing safety standards in line with latest recommendations of the World Health Organization (WHO) but also sets an obligation for EU countries to improve access to safe drinking water for all, and more specifically to vulnerable and marginalised groups. It aimed for more environment protection, the development of a circular economy and adaptation to climate change. The water sector accounts for 3.5% of the electricity consumption. At local level, power charges make up between 30 and 50% of municipalities' bills, which are easily passed on to consumers who usually have no alternative suppliers. In addition to that, the Commission revealed that Europe has a massive issue around water leakage. According to their analysis, the average leakage rate in Europe stands at 23% of treated water. The commission's solution to address this issue has been to include transparency requirements for the biggest water suppliers to publish information on their water leakage and energy consumption.

The recast Directive entered into force on 12 January 2021, with Member State now having two years for its implementation. The new directive replaces the Council Directive 98/83/EC of 3 November 1998. The Directive contains additional restrictions on the presence of potentially dangerous compounds in water meant for human consumption (polyfluoroalkyl substances and EDCs).

== UK ==
The Water Resources Act 1991 was used to introduce the Drinking water directive into UK law. In the UK, the Drinking Water Inspectorate is responsible for reporting on drinking water quality to the European Union.

The Water Services Regulation Authority, or Ofwat, is the body responsible for economic regulation of the privatised water and sewerage industry in England and Wales. Ofwat has been successfully reducing the water leakage in England by setting leakage targets to each of the water companies. Called the "sustainable economic level of leakage", water companies have to fix leaks, as long as the cost of doing so is less than the cost of not fixing the leak. The cost of not fixing a leak includes environmental damage and the cost of developing new water resources to compensate for the water lost through leaks. In the event where a water company fails to meet its water leakage reduction target, they are penalised. The most recent example is when the Thames Water company had to repay £65 million to its customers – on top of £55 million of automatic fines – for failing to meet leakage targets in the current financial year, as well as in 2016/7 and 2017/18. The company also confirmed that it would invest an additional £200 million between now and 2020 to ensure that it meets the leakage target in 2019/20.

== See also ==
- EU law
- UK enterprise law
- Sustainable Development Goal 6
- Water, energy and food security nexus
- Bathing Waters Directive 2006
- Water Framework Directive
- Environmental Quality Standards Directive
- Groundwater Directive
- Marine Strategy Framework Directive
- Urban Waste Water Treatment Directive
