= Asset management plan period =

An Asset Management Plan (AMP) period is a five-year time period used in the English and Welsh water industry. It is used by the UK Water Services Regulation Authority, Ofwat, to set allowable price increases for the privately owned water companies and for the assessment of many key performance indicators such as water quality and customer service. The water companies often align the frameworks they hold with contractors to the AMP periods.

== Definition ==
The asset management plan period was introduced as a result of the privatisation of the water industry in England and Wales. The AMP periods are linked to the regular price reviews used by the Water Services Regulation Authority (Ofwat) to set the allowable price increase for consumers (known as the k factor). AMP periods are five years in duration and begin on 1 April in years ending in 0 or 5; the current period is AMP8 (2025-2030). The price reviews are carried out in the year preceding the start of a new AMP (so the AMP6 price review was carried out in 2014 and is referred to as PR14). Water company business plans align with the AMP periods and their investment estimates are used by Ofwat as part of its price review. Ofwat also assesses each company's performance in relation to customer service, capability, water quality, and environmental impact in the previous AMP with better performing companies being allowed higher price increases. Water companies use the AMP periods to define the duration of their frameworks with contractors.

== Individual AMP periods ==
The first four asset management plan periods were focused on modernising infrastructure inherited from the public sector to meet strict new European Union limits on acceptable water quality. Funding was targeted on the construction of new facilities and the upgrading of existing assets.

In AMP5 (2010-2015) there was a shift towards minimising operational costs and making better use of existing assets. The trend was predicted to continue into AMP6 (2015-2020) with a reduction in the proportion of expenditure allocated for capital projects. Ofwat also wanted companies to become more sustainable in their operations in AMP6 and incorporate longer term thinking into their business plans. The water companies were set a target of saving 370 million litres of water per day from wastage and to reduce the length of time customers were left without supply. It was believed that AMP7 (2020–25) will target environmental improvements, particularly with regards quality of water bodies. AMP8 (2025-2030) features almost double the investment of AMP7 into Water Infrastructure, from £59 to £104 Billion, following intensive scrutiny into river pollution and increased combined storm overflow events. Under the Cunliffe Report however, Ofwat was recommended to be scrapped, with future AMP's to be replaced with a new management plans, or managed by new bodies separated by England and Wales.

== Criticism ==
The nature of the AMP period model leads to a "boom and bust" cycle of investment repeating every five years. Spending peaks during the central 12–18 months of the period before tailing off. Businesses supplying design and construction services often lose 40% of their staff in the "winding down" phase of the cycle, many of whom do not return to the sector in the next AMP period. This leads to increased costs to the industry.
