= Drinking Water Quality Regulator for Scotland =

Public Body of the Scottish Government

Agency overview
- Formed: 2002
- Type: Public body of the Scottish Government
- Jurisdiction: Scotland
- Headquarters: Victoria Quay, Edinburgh
- Agency executive: Matthew Bower (acting), Chief Executive
- Website: https://dwqr.scot/

The Drinking Water Quality Regulator for Scotland (DWQR) is a public body of the Scottish Government charged with ensuring drinking water in Scotland is safe to drink. The regulator undertakes inspections and monitoring to ensure water supplied by Scottish Water meets the requirements of The Public Water Supplies (Scotland) Regulations 2014, and takes action where these requirements are not met. DWQR also oversees the supply of water to the approximately 3% of the population who receive their drinking water from private water supplies, although regulation of such sources is the responsibility of the local authority. The DWQR was formed in 2002, following the passage of the Water Industry (Scotland) Act 2002.

Economic regulation of the water and sewerage industry in Scotland is undertaken by the Water Industry Commission for Scotland, which monitors and reports on Scottish Water’s performance regarding customer service, investment, costs and leakage.

The Drinking Water Inspectorate is the equivalent body for England and Wales.

== See also ==
- Water supply and sanitation in Scotland
