= Anglian Water =

Water company that operates in the east of England

Anglian Water Services Limited
- Company type: Subsidiary
- Industry: Water industry
- Founded: 1989
- Headquarters: Huntingdon, Cambridgeshire
- Area served: East of England
- Key people: Ros Rivaz (Chair); Mark Thurston (CEO);
- Products: Drinking water; Recycled wastewater
- Production output: 1.1 Gl/day (drinking); 0.9 Gl/day (recycled)
- Revenue: ▼£1,351.8 million (2020-2021); £1,419.9 million (2019-2020)
- Operating income: ▼£391.6 million (2020-2021); £399.1 million (2019-2020)
- Net income: ▲£98.8 million (2020-2021); £(76.8) million (2019-2020)
- Number of employees: 5,000
- Parent: AWG
- Website: anglianwater.co.uk

Anglian Water Services Limited is a water company that operates in the East of England. It was formed in 1989 under the partial privatisation of the water industry. It provides water supply, sewerage and sewage treatment to the area formerly the responsibility of the Anglian Water Authority. The remaining functions of the authority were transferred to the Environment Agency. Anglian Water is regulated under the United Kingdom Water Industry Act 1991.

== Supply area ==
Anglian Water supplies drinking water to all or parts of Bedfordshire, Buckinghamshire, Cambridgeshire, Essex, Lincolnshire, Norfolk, Northamptonshire and Suffolk.

Anglian Water provides drainage and sewerage to a wider area, stretching from the Humber in the north to the River Thames in the south, including the Great Ouse and a small part of Greater London around Upminster.

== Corporate information ==
Anglian Water Services Limited is a private limited company that provides the majority of Anglian Water branded services and utilities and is registered in England and Wales with company number 2366656.

Campaigners have questioned the morality of Anglian Water paying the highest dividends of any water company in England - £4.6bn - when the cash should be spent on improving. This was between the period 2012 and 2022.

== Customer service ==
Anglian Water came joint first in the qualitative 'Satisfaction by company' league table for water and sewerage companies in Ofwat's Service Incentive Mechanism Annual Report 2012/13, having ranked fourth in the same survey in 2011/12 and fifteenth in 2010/11

== Campaigns ==
=== Keep It Clear ===
The Anglian Water "Keep It Clear" campaign aimed to reduce sewer blockages in the region caused by fats, oils, grease and unflushable items like baby wipes. The campaign also worked with community leaders to inform the public and offered free sink strainers to stop food waste going down drains. Following a seven-week trial in Peterborough, blockages fell by more than 80%. The model is now being rolled out to other "hotspot" towns and cities in the region.

=== Drop 20 ===
The "Drop 20" campaign encouraged the public to lower their water consumption by 20 litres (4 1/2 imp gal) per day to reduce the energy needed to deliver water and upkeep infrastructure. Anglian's reasoning behind the campaign was to reduce their environmental impact and for water conservation, as the region is quite dry in comparison to other areas of the country. The company commented:

"Where there's water, there's carbon – and quite a bit of it. Every bath, flush or glug has CO2 built into it, thanks to all the processes it takes to get it to the tap. So using less water is good news for the planet. It's good news for us too, because it's our job to keep supplies flowing to over 6 million customers in this dry region."

== Operations ==
As of 2006, it provided water for 2.6 million properties in a supply area of 10,600 square miles (27,500 km^{2}). In 1997 Anglian took over Hartlepool Water.

In August 2024, Anglian Water proposed to spend £5 billion constructing two major reservoirs, one located 30 miles (48 km) miles north of Cambridge between Chatteris and March, the other 30 miles (48 km) miles south of Lincoln.

== Anglian Water Leisure ==
Anglian operates several reservoirs, including Rutland Water, Grafham Water, Alton Water, Pitsford Water, Ravensthorpe and Taverham Mill. A separate leisure division of the company was formed to promote the use of these facilities for recreational use. Activities provided include water sports, fishing, bird watching, cycling and walking.

== Performance ==
=== Leakage ===
In 2012/13 Anglian Water's leakage rate was 4.97m3/km/day; compared to 5.26m3/km/day in 2011/12, 6.10m3/km/day in 2010/11, 5.62m3/km/day in 2009/10, 5.60m3/km/day in 2008/09 and 2007/08.

=== Drinking water quality ===
Drinking water quality in 2012 was 99.96%, as in 2011, 2010, 2009 and 2007. In 2008 it was 99.98%.

=== Environmental record controversies ===
Anglian Water states that it has a "commitment to the environment" and takes its "responsibility as a custodian of the environment very seriously." Compliance failures have, however, caused it to be described by the Environment Agency as a "repeat offender" regarding pollution. Instances include:

- July 1992 – Fined £18,000 by magistrates at Fakenham, Norfolk, after releasing sewage into a creek at Wells-next-the-Sea.
- April 1993 – Ranked eighth in the National Rivers Authority's "top ten" list of worst polluters.
- January 1995 – Listed again in the National Rivers Authority's top ten of worst polluters, having been convicted of polluting waterways on 16 occasions the previous year.
- February 1997 – Fined £7,500 at Luton Crown Court after admitting river pollution at Leighton Buzzard.
- February 1997 – Fined £2,000 with £783 costs after oil from its Heigham Waterworks in Norwich contaminated the River Wensum and its population of swans.
- July 1997 – Set a water industry record by receiving three convictions in one week for water pollution. Subsequently hired the New Labour-linked lobbying company Lawson, Lucas and Mendelsohn to avert responsibility for breaking environmental regulations.
- January 1999 – Fined £10,000 with £4,800 costs at Witham Magistrates' Court for supplying water unfit for human consumption contrary to the Water Industry Act 1991. The prosecution was brought by the Drinking Water Inspectorate and related to supplying contaminated water to 11,000 people in Halstead, Essex, in December 1997.
- February 1999 – Fined £15,000 with £5,521 costs at Ipswich Crown Court for supplying water unfit for human consumption. The water was contaminated with bacteria from cow and pig manure, causing an outbreak of diarrhoea and stomach cramps in customers.
- March 1999 – Ranked sixth in the Environment Agency's league table of "worst polluters" in England and Wales during 1998.
- July 2000 – Ranked second in the Environment Agency's list of worst polluters, with total fines of £71,250 and 14 court appearances in 1999.
- September 2001 – Fined £21,000 with £7,345 in costs after pleading guilty to supplying water unfit for human consumption to consumers in areas of Bedfordshire in August 2000.
- October 2001 – 200 tons of raw sewage was discharged from a treatment plant in Wickford into the River Crouch, which killed fish and waterfowl along a 1 1/4-mile (2 km) stretch of the river. In 2002 the company were fined £200,000 at Basildon Crown Court for the incident. The fine was later reduced on appeal.
- 2002 – Allowed pollution with raw sewage to wipe out most wildlife in Elstow Brook, Bedfordshire. Fined £190,000.
- July 2002 – Listed again by the Environment Agency in its top ten polluters league.
- February 2003 – Fined £17,000 for polluting the River Great Ouse in Norfolk with sewage.
- February 2003 – Fined £18,000 for pumping sewage effluent into the North Sea off Lowestoft.
- June 2003 – Fined £12,000 with £3,442 costs after contaminating a waterway with raw sewage overflow from a pumping station.
- July 2003 – Ranked second in the Environment Agency's list of top ten polluters, with total fines of £285,000 for 2002. Barbara Young, the chief executive of the Environment Agency, criticised the polluters for "treat[ing] Britain like a dustbin" and warned that the situation would continue so long as "pathetic" penalties meant that it made economic sense for the worst offenders to carry on polluting. "It seems extraordinary that multi-million-pound businesses are still prepared to risk their reputations with careless and avoidable neglect of environmental responsibility," she said.
- June 2004 – Fined £18,000 with £1,748 costs after admitting polluting near Wilstead, Bedfordshire.
- July 2004 – Listed again in the Environment Agency's top ten of polluters.
- October 2008 – Fined £150,000 for "repeated illegal discharging from sewage works."
- July 2010 – Fined £27,000 with £28,000 costs at Basildon Crown Court for allowing untreated sewage from one of its pumping stations to leak into the River Crouch at Wickford on 17 August 2009. This was Anglia Water's 90th conviction for polluting waterways.
- January 2011 – Fined £35,000 fine after discharging untreated sewage into the River Wid on 13 September 2009, killing hundreds of fish.
- May 2011 – Ranked first in an Environment Agency list of worst water polluters, with 296 "unconsented incidents".
- August 2011 – An Anglian Water pumping station caused sewage to leak into the River Crouch at Wickford and Runwell. Peter Steward, from the River Crouch Conservation Trust, said: "It is such a small river it can't cope with sewage leaks."
- December 2011 – Fined £32,000 with £3,974 costs at Lincoln Magistrates' Court after polluting a Lincoln stream. Between July 2004 and October 2008, five previous pollutions were attributed to blockages in the foul sewer, and two formal cautions were issued to Anglian Water. "The defendant was aware of the vulnerability of the system before the 2011 incidents and failed to take appropriate measures," said Claire Bentley, prosecuting.
- October 2012 – Fined £36,000 with £5,973 costs at Chelmsford Magistrates' Court for polluting a two-mile (3 km) stretch of the River Chelmer in Thaxted, Essex in June 2012, killing hundreds of fish, including lamprey, bullhead, minnow, stickleback and stone loach. The fine was reduced on appeal.
- March 2013 – Fined £20,000 with £2,896 costs after sewage spilled from a pumping station at Filby, near Great Yarmouth, into the Ormesby Little Broad. Between September 2006 and March 2011, there were five previous similar incidents.
- June 2022 – Fined £300,000 after a pumping station breakdown led to pollution, killing more than 5,000 fish in the River Wid in Essex.

In November 2023, following Conservative Party MP Steve Barclay's appointment as Secretary of State for Environment, Food and Rural Affairs in a Cabinet Reshuffle, Anglian Water found itself as the subject of conflict of interest allegations, after it was revealed that Barclay's wife, Karen Barclay, was Head of Public Affairs for the water firm, and later its Head of Regional Engagement. It was later confirmed that Mr Barclay had correctly disclosed his wife's job on the most recent List of Ministers' Interests.

=== Health and safety record ===
On 18 December 2015, Anglian Water Services Limited (AWSL) was fined £400,000 with costs of £41,711 after pleading guilty to breaches of section 2(1) of the Health and Safety at Work etc. Act 1974. Luton Crown Court heard three workers were injured in two separate incidents at its water recycling centres in Dunstable, Bedfordshire, and Saffron Walden, Essex. The court also heard Anglian Water Services Ltd had four previous prosecutions by HSE, the most recent in 2010, 2004 and 1997. An improvement notice was served on AWSL following a fall from a height accident in 2007.
