= Centre City Tower, Birmingham =

Centre City Tower
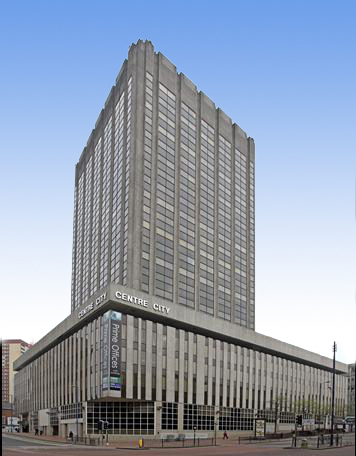
- Centre City Tower, Hill Street
- Interactive map of the Centre City Tower area

General information
- Type: Commercial
- Architectural style: Brutalist
- Location: Hill Street, Birmingham, England
- Coordinates: 52°28′33.66″N 1°53′54.61″W
- Construction started: 1972
- Completed: 1975

Height
- Height: 76m

Technical details
- Floor count: 21

Design and construction
- Architects: Richard Seifert and Partners

Centre City Tower is a commercial building in the Birmingham city centre, England owned by Bruntwood.

The building's architects were Richard Seifert and Partners.

The Centre City complex consists of two buildings, the Tower and the Podium. The Podium is a low-rise building that surrounds the Tower base, but (with the exception of fire escapes) there is no direct connection between the two. This arrangement means that the first floor of the Tower is at approximately seventh-floor level when compared with other buildings.

When first constructed, the Podium contained at ground level a nightclub and a theatre. The theatre was a requirement of the City Council, who stipulated that a public amenity should be provided as a condition of granting planning permission. However, the proximity of three other theatres probably contributed to no-one taking up the concession to run the theatre and it remained unused until c.1990, when it and the nightclub space were converted to additional office accommodation, under the title 'Centre City Atrium'. Before building work commenced, the 'lost' theatre was featured in an article in the UK trade journal New Civil Engineer.

This may explain why the street at the back of the building is called 'Theatre Approach' though the presence next door of the former Tatler Theatre may be a more convincing explanation.

The Podium exterior was cleaned in mid-2006 using a power-washer.

It was named as the 'ugliest building in the UK' by photography experts ParrotPrint.

== See also ==
- List of tallest buildings and structures in Birmingham
