= Water Industry Commission for Scotland =

Economic regulator in Scotland

Agency overview
- Formed: 2005
- Type: Executive non-departmental public body
- Jurisdiction: Scotland
- Headquarters: Stirling, Scotland
- Employees: 28 (Q1 2022)
- Website: www.watercommission.co.uk

The Water Industry Commission for Scotland (WICS) (Scottish Gaelic: Coimisean Gnìomhachas Uisge na h-Alba) is the economic regulator of the water and sewerage industry in Scotland. Established in 2005, it is an executive non-departmental public body of the Scottish Government with statutory responsibilities.

The WICS's board comprises a non-executive chairman and two non-executive members. It is based in Stirling and since Jume 2025 has been led by the Chief Executive, David Satti, following his earlier period as Interim Chief Executive.

== Activities ==
=== Price setting ===
The Water Industry Commission for Scotland has a statutory duty to promote the interests of customers by setting prices for water and sewerage services that deliver Scottish Ministers’ objectives for the water industry at the lowest reasonable overall cost. The objectives include improvements in water quality, environmental performance and customer service. The price setting process takes place every six years, with the current regulatory period covering the years 2027-2033.

=== Monitoring performance ===
WICS monitors and reports on Scottish Water’s performance regarding customer service, investment, costs and leakage. WICS sets challenging targets for Scottish Water to achieve and monitors performance to make sure that it responds positively to these challenges. The regulatory framework in Scotland has resulted in Scottish Water becoming significantly more efficient and has helped keep bills low. WICS is not responsible for monitoring the quality of water supplied to consumers in Scotland, as this is a duty of the Drinking Water Quality Regulator for Scotland.

=== Retail Competition ===
The Water Industry Commission for Scotland is also responsible for facilitating competition in the Scottish water industry. In April 2008 Scotland became the first country in the world to open up water and sewerage services to competition for all non-household customers, under the Water Services etc. (Scotland) Act 2005. This means that all non-household customers (public sector, non-profit and business organisations) are able to choose who provides their services. WICS is responsible for implementing the framework set out in the Act, including licensing all participants in the market. Since competition has been introduced there have been significant improvements for customers, with more options and better services.

== See also ==
- Water supply and sanitation in Scotland
