= Ofwat =

England and Wales water and sewerage regulator

Water Services Regulation Authority Awdurdod Rheoleiddio Gwasanaethau Dŵr

Agency overview
- Formed: 1 April 1989
- Preceding agency: Office of Water Services
- Type: Non-ministerial government department
- Jurisdiction: England and Wales
- Headquarters: Centre City Tower, Birmingham
- Employees: 254
- Annual budget: £19.1 million (2011-2012)
- Agency executive: David Black, chief executive
- Parent department: Department for Environment, Food and Rural Affairs
- Website: ofwat.gov.uk

- Applies to: England and Wales
- Relates to: Economic regulation of water and sewerage industry

Other UK counterparts
- Northern Ireland: Northern Ireland Authority for Utility Regulation
- Scotland: Water Industry Commission for Scotland

The Water Services Regulation Authority, or Ofwat, is a non-ministerial government department and body responsible for the economic regulation of the privatised water and sewerage industry in England and Wales. Ofwat's main statutory duties include protecting the interests of consumers, securing the long-term resilience of water supply and wastewater systems, and ensuring that companies carry out their functions and are able to finance them. In July 2025, it was announced the government intends to abolish it and the Drinking Water Inspectorate, and replace it with two new regulators, one for England and one for Wales.

Ofwat primarily sets limits on the prices charged for water and sewerage services, taking into account proposed capital investment schemes (such as building new wastewater treatment works) and expected operational efficiency gains. The most recent review was carried out in December 2024.

The Water Act 2014 extended retail competition to all non-household customers of English water companies from April 2017 and provided for possible future competition in wholesale markets. Ofwat's role includes regulating such water and wastewater markets and promoting effective competition wherever appropriate.

Ofwat consists of a board, plus an office of staff which carries out work delegated to them by the board. Ofwat is headquartered in the Centre City Tower in Birmingham.

The Environment Agency is responsible for environmental regulation, and the Drinking Water Inspectorate for regulating drinking water quality. Water in Northern Ireland is regulated by the Northern Ireland Authority for Utility Regulation, and the supply and treatment is carried out by the government-owned Northern Ireland Water. There is no separate charge for water for residents or companies in Northern Ireland. Instead, water is paid for by the rates system. The water industry regulator in Scotland is the Water Industry Commission for Scotland.

== History ==
Ofwat was set up in 1988, at the same time as 10 water authorities in England and Wales were privatised by flotation on the stock market. Its duties and powers are defined by the Water Industry Act 1991. The resulting companies are known as "water and sewerage companies"; this distinguishes them from around a dozen smaller companies which only provide water services, which were already in private hands in 1989 (having remained in private ownership since their creation in the 19th century). The water-only companies provide water to around 25% of the population in England and Wales.

Before 1 April 2006, all regulatory powers rested with the Director General of Water Services. The staff who supported the role of the Director General were collectively known as the "Office of Water Services", which was abbreviated to "Ofwat". Ian Byatt was the Director General between 1989 and 2000; Philip Fletcher was Director General until 2006 and chairman until 2012. On 1 April 2006, the Director General was replaced by the Water Services Regulation Authority. The name "Office of Water Services" is no longer used, as it had no legal basis.

=== Abolition ===
In July 2025, the government announced that Ofwat would be scrapped as part of major reforms to the water industry. Along with the Drinking Water Inspectorate and parts of the Environment Agency and Natural England, it will be replaced with an integrated single regulator for England and a similar one for Wales.

== Key people ==
The current chair is Iain Coucher, who took up his position in July 2022, replacing Johnson Cox who had held the position since November 2012. Initially taking over from Rachel Fletcher as interim chief executive in April 2021, the current chief executive is David Black who was fully appointed to the role in April 2022.

== Price reviews ==
Every five years, Ofwat set limits on the prices which water companies in England and Wales can charge to their customers; this process is known as a price review or periodic review. Ofwat has carried out six price reviews so far – in 1994 (PR94), 1999 (PR99), 2004 (PR04), 2009 (PR09), 2014 (PR14), 2019 (PR19) and 2024 (PR24). PR24 sets price limits for 2025–2030. Ofwat sets a so-called "K factor" in companies' licences which determine the average value of price rises above the rate of inflation (RPI) for the next five year asset management plan period.

== Ofwat Innovation Fund ==
In 2020, Ofwat launched the Ofwat Innovation Fund, which was designed to foster innovation within the UK water sector. The fund initially had £200 million backing, and was extended in 2025 with a further £400 million of funding. Since its launch, Ofwat has awarded funding to 93 projects involving 240 partners to expand the water sector’s ability to innovate and meet the evolving needs of customers, society and the environment.

In 2023 Avtar Jirh, managing director at Enpure, questioned the fund's ability to effectively foster innovation across the water sector. In 2025, Chancellor of the Exchequer Rachel Reeves welcomed the fund as a "promising vehicle for promoting economic growth".

In May 2026, Innovate UK announced that it would be stepping back from the role of the delivery partner for the innovation fund, in order to allow the organisation to better align with the UK Government’s new industrial strategy.

== See also ==
- List of United Kingdom water companies
- Water supply and sanitation in England and Wales
