= Scottish Water =

Water supply board

Scottish Water Ltd.
- Type: Statutory corporation
- Industry: Water industry
- Founded: 2002
- Headquarters: Stepps, Scotland
- Area served: Scotland
- Key people: Deirdre Michie OBE (Chair); Alex Plant (CEO);
- Products: Drinking water; Recycled wastewater
- Production output: 1.34 Gl/day (drinking)
- Services: Water supply; Sewage treatment
- Revenue: £1.0 billion
- Subsidiaries: Business Stream
- Website: www.scottishwater.co.uk

Scottish Water is a statutory corporation that provides water and sewerage services across Scotland based in Stepps, Scotland. It is accountable to the public through the Scottish Government.

== Operations ==
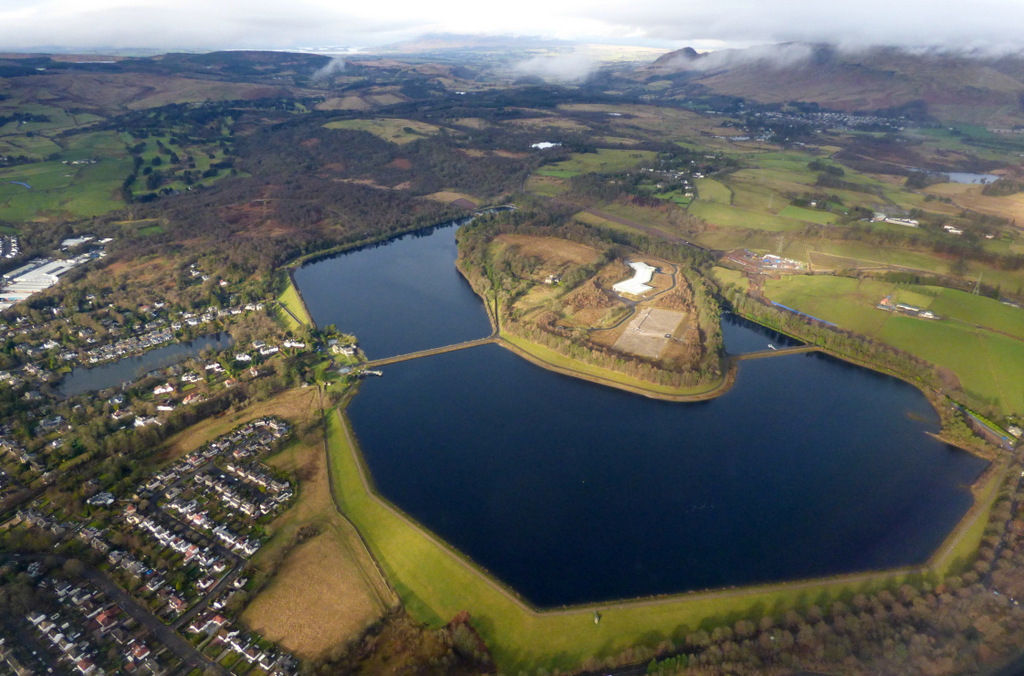
The Milngavie water treatment works is one of the largest water purification plants in Europe, serving the city of Glasgow with over 1.5 million people.

Scottish Water provides drinking water to 2.46 million households and 150,000 business customers in Scotland. Every day it supplies 1.34 billion litres of drinking water and takes away 847 million litres of waste water from customers' properties and treats it before returning it to the environment.

== Regulated services ==
Scottish Water operates under a regulatory framework established by the Water Services etc. (Scotland) Act 2005 allowing an economic regulator, the Water Industry Commission for Scotland, to set the cost of the service independently. The Water Industry Commission for Scotland establishes the "lowest overall reasonable cost" through a benchmarking exercise with private water companies operating in England and Wales. Scottish Water has a right of appeal against this price setting process through a reference to the UK Competition Commission. In 2013–2014 the charge for an average household bill was around £334.

The Drinking Water Quality Regulator for Scotland and the Scottish Environment Protection Agency also regulate Scottish Water. The Scottish Public Services Ombudsman represents the interest of Scottish Water's customers and has powers to investigate complaints.

== Water quality ==
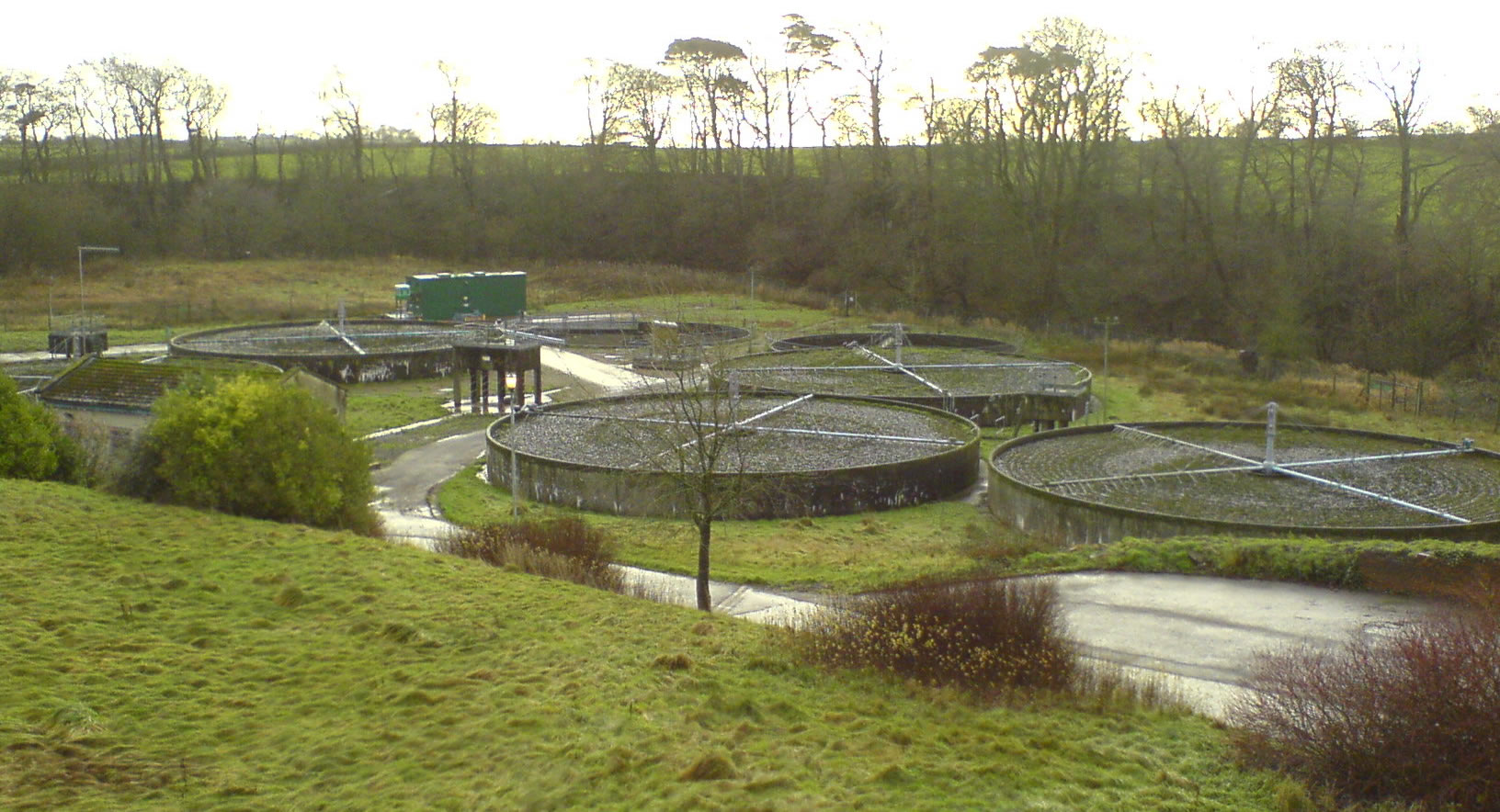
A waste water treatment works

Scottish Water is benchmarked against the performance of water companies in England and Wales. In the year 2014–2015 they reported outcomes that were comparable with recent performance by leading water companies in England and Wales, as well undertaking a major investment programme.

In 2021, it was revealed that untreated sewage was discharged by Scottish Water into Scotland's rivers and lochs more than 12,000 times in a single year, through combined sewage outflows. It emerged that the regulator, SEPA, estimated that there were 645 'unsatisfactory' outflows, and that Scottish Government officials viewed Scotland as being 'way behind' England in dealing with the problem.

== History ==
The authority was founded in 2002 by a merger of West of Scotland Water Authority, East of Scotland Water Authority and North of Scotland Water Authority under the Water Industry (Scotland) Act 2002, an act of the Scottish Parliament. Because 100 percent of it is owned by the Scottish Government it is considered a statutory corporation.

It has offices in Aberdeen, Dundee, Edinburgh, Glasgow and Inverness. 3,600 people are employed across the organisation. It has an annual turnover of around £1bn and is funded by charges paid by its customers. Part of its long term capital expenditure is funded by long-term loans from the Scottish Government.

National policy is determined by the Scottish Government, to whom the authority reports. The Scottish Government has consulted as to how Scottish Water can work together with Scottish Canals and Caledonian Maritime Assets to achieve additional public benefit from all Scotland's water-related infrastructure, both inland and maritime.

== Investment programme ==
"Quality and Standards" is the planning process that Scottish Government uses to set out areas for improvement. Quality and Standards 3, covered the period from 2006 to 2015, during which Scottish Water were asked to deliver one of the largest capital investment programmes in the UK, including more than 2,000 individual projects. There were two main elements of capital investment:

- maintenance: to maintain existing levels of service to customers and to protect the environment, by replacing worn out plant and equipment
- capital enhancement: to improve performance such as drinking water quality, environmental performance and customer service.

A £3.5bn investment programme for the period 2015 to 2021 was announced on 29 September 2014. Scottish Water's approach to capital maintenance has previously received independent, high level scrutiny.
