= Drinking Water Inspectorate =

Drinking Water Inspectorate (England and Wales)
- Applies to: England and Wales
- Relates to: Drinking water quality

Other UK counterparts
- Northern Ireland: Drinking Water Inspectorate (NI)
- Scotland: Drinking Water Quality Regulator for Scotland

Logo

The Drinking Water Inspectorate (DWI) is a section of Department for Environment, Food and Rural Affairs (Defra), established in 1990 alongside water privatisation, to provide independent reassurance that drinking water supplies in England and Wales are safe and of acceptable quality.

Based in Whitehall, it produces an annual report showing the quality of and problems associated with drinking water. Its remit is to assess the quality of drinking water in England and Wales, taking enforcement action if standards are not being met, and appropriate action when water is unfit for human consumption.

Before the United Kingdom left the European Union in 2020, the Drinking Water Inspectorate reported on drinking water quality to the European Union under the European Drinking Water Directive (DWD), Council Directive 98/83/EC, which concerns the quality of water intended for human consumption. It provides advice to Defra on the transposition of European water legislation in England and Wales.

The Drinking Water Quality Regulator for Scotland is the equivalent body for Scotland.
