= Water industry =

Drinking and wastewater services

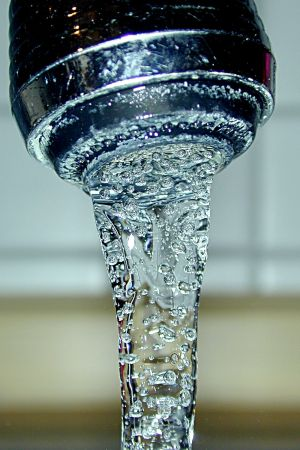
Drinking water

The water industry provides drinking water and wastewater services (including sewage treatment) to residential, commercial, and industrial sectors of the economy. Typically, public utilities operate water supply networks. The water industry does not include manufacturers and suppliers of bottled water, which is part of the beverage production and belongs to the food sector.

The water industry includes water engineering, operations, water and wastewater plant construction, equipment supply and specialist water treatment chemicals, among others.

The water industry is at the service of other industries, e.g. of the food sector which produces beverages such as bottled water.

== Organizational structure ==
There are a variety of organizational structures for the water industry, with countries usually having one dominant traditional structure, which usually changes only gradually over time.

=== Ownership of water infrastructure and operations ===
- local government – the most usual structure worldwide, public utility
- national government – in many developing countries, especially smaller ones
- private ownership – more common in the developed world, see for example Water privatisation in England and Wales
- co-operative ownership and related NGO structures, public utility

=== Operations ===
- local government operating the system through a municipal department, municipal company, or inter-municipal company
- local government outsources operations to private sector, i.e. private water operators
- national government operations
- private water operators own the system
  - BOTs – private sector building parts of a water system (such as a wastewater treatment plant) and operating it for an agreed period before transferring to public sector ownership and operation.
- cooperation and NGO operators

=== Functions ===
- Integrated water system (water supply, sewerage (sanitation) system, and wastewater treatment)
- Separation by function (e.g. Dutch system where sewerage run by city, water supply by municipal or provincial companies, and water treatment by water boards), though some Water Supply Companies have merged beyond municipal or provincial borders.
- Other separation (e.g. Munich, separated into three companies for bulk water supply, water and wastewater network operations, and retail)

== Standards ==
Water quality standards and environmental standards relating to wastewater are usually set by national bodies.

- In England, the Drinking Water Inspectorate and the Environment Agency.
- In the United States, drinking water standards for public water systems are set by the United States Environmental Protection Agency (EPA) pursuant to the Safe Drinking Water Act. EPA issues water pollution control standards in conjunction with state environmental agencies, pursuant to the Clean Water Act.
- For countries within the European Union, water-related European Union directives are important for water resource management and environmental and water quality standards. Key directives include the Urban Waste Water Treatment Directive 1992 requiring most towns and cities to treat their wastewater to specified standards, and the Water Framework Directive 2000, which requires water resource plans based on river basins, including public participation based on Aarhus Convention principles.
- International Standards (ISO) on water service management and assessment are under preparation within Technical Committee ISO/TC 224.

== Global companies ==
Using available data only, and during 2009–2010, the ten largest water companies active globally were (largest first): Veolia Environnement (France), Suez Environnement (France), ITT Corporation (US), United Utilities (UK), Severn Trent (UK), Thames Water (UK), American Water Works Company (US), GE Water (US), Kurita Water Industries (Japan), Nalco Water (US).

== See also ==
- American Water Works Association – North American industry and standards association for drinking water
- Imagine H2O – International accelerator and organization for water technology startups
- Millennium Development Goals – goal 7 of the MDGs aimed to "reduce by half the proportion of people without sustainable access to safe drinking water"
- National Rural Water Association – Industry association supporting small and rural water and wastewater utilities in the United States.
- Water Environment Federation – Professional association for ambient water quality research and pollution control
