= Direct democracy in Berlin =

The state of Berlin has three instruments of direct democracy. These enable German citizen residents to directly influence policy, in addition to indirect democracy via elected officials in the House of Representatives. In addition, there are two instruments at the borough level.

== Types ==
The three direct democracy instruments at the Berlin state level are:

- Agenda initiative (Volksinitiative (Germany)), a petition which forces the Berlin House of Representatives to debate a certain topic;
- Referendum (Volksentscheid (Germany)), which requires a Volksbegehren (Germany), which in turn requires an Antrag auf ein Volksbegehren. Referendums require 25% quoracy;
- Constitutional referendum (Verfassungsreferendum), a referendum that changes the state constitution. In addition to the requirements of regular referendums, it requires a vote in the House of Representatives with a two-thirds majority and at least 50% turnout. This was used once, in 2006.

In addition to these instruments for direct democracy at the city-state level, there are two instruments at the lower, borough, level:

- Residents' request (Einwohnerantrag), a petition which forces the borough assembly (Bezirksverodnetenversammlung) to address a certain topic;
- Citizens' decision (Bürgerentscheid), which requires the collection of signature of at least 3% of eligible voters (citizens' initiative, Bürgerbegehren), see Bügerbegehren and Bürgerentscheid.

== History of the framework of direct democracy in Berlin ==
In 2020, the Berlin government started a reform that would make it easier to organise petitions and referendums at both the Berlin and borough levels.

== Past Berlin-wide initiatives ==
=== Past agenda initiatives ===
==== Democracy for All (2022) ====
The agenda initiative "Democracy for All" was a petition passed in 2022 with three demands. Firstly, it asked for a reduction of the voting age from 18 to 16 for Berlin House of Representatives elections and referendums. Secondly, the petition set out that non-German citizens could vote after living in Germany for three years. For this purpose, the petition asked the House of Representatives to request a Bundesrat initiative from the Berlin Senate, which represents Berlin in the Bundesrat. The initiative would give full active and passive voting rights for elections to municipal councils, state legislatures (including the Berlin House of Representatives), to the Bundestag and to the European Parliament. Thirdly, the initiative demanded that Berlin agenda initiatives and referendums could be initiated and signed digitally.

As a result of the agenda initiative, in December 2022 the Berlin House of Representatives passed a motion to implement parts of the agenda initiative. Under the motion, the first of the three demands (voting from 16 years on) would be met, and foreigners would be allowed to vote after five years of residency instead of three. However, the motion passed under a red-green-red coalition government and set out its implementation only after the 2023 re-run of the Berlin elections.

=== Past referendums ===
==== Referendum to municipalise housing (2021) ====
The 2021 Berlin referendum, formally referred to as Deutsche Wohnen & Co. enteignen (English: Expropriate Deutsche Wohnen & Co.) or DW enteignen, was a referendum held and passed in Berlin in 2021. Voters were asked if they approved of the expropriation of the property of private real-estate companies with 3,000 or more units in the city, through public purchases by the Berlin state government. This would affect 243,000 rental apartments out of 1.5 million total apartments in Berlin. The largest such real-estate company is Deutsche Wohnen, for which the initiative is named, followed by Vonovia. In total, the referendum would impact 12 large real-estate companies.

==== Referendum to make Berlin climate-neutral by 2030 (2023) ====
Volksentscheid Berlin 2030 klimaneutral Results

The 2023 Berlin climate neutrality referendum, also referred to as Berlin 2030 climate-neutral (German: Berlin 2030 klimaneutral), was a citizens' initiative launched in Berlin in 2018. It was the subject of a city-wide referendum on 26 March 2023, commonly called the Klima-Volksentscheid (English: climate referendum). Voters were asked whether the Climate Protection and Energy Transition Act of 2016 should be amended. The primary goal of the referendum was to legislate a goal of carbon neutrality by the year 2030 rather than the existing goal of 2045. Since the referendum proposed specific amendments to the law, its result would have been legally binding. In order to pass, the proposal needed to be approved by a majority of voters and receive approval from a quorum of over 25% of registered voters. While 50.9% of those who participated voted in favour, as turnout was approximately 18%, the 25% quorum was not met.

Results of past referendums by borough
Nr	Borough (Bezirk)	Keep Tempelhof airport open (2008)	ProReli(2009)	Water contract transparency (2011)	Re-municipalise energy grids (2013)	KeepTempelhofer Feld empty (2014)	Keep Tegel airport open (2017)	Municipalise housing (2021)
1	Mitte	58.4 %	44.8 %	97.8 %	87.1 %	65.2 %	54.7 %	63.7 %
2	Friedrichshain-Kreuzberg	39.2 %	25.8 %	98.2 %	92.9 %	77.0 %	44.9 %	72.4 %
3	Pankow	34.0 %	28.7 %	98.4 %	88.1 %	62.5 %	43.0 %	60.8 %
4	Charlottenburg-Wilmersdorf	71.6 %	60.3 %	98.4 %	80.2 %	60.7 %	68.3 %	50.1 %
5	Spandau	75.8 %	69.2 %	97.9 %	75.7 %	59.0 %	57.1 %	51.9 %
6	Steglitz-Zehlendorf	73.8 %	66.3 %	98.2 %	75.6 %	61.2 %	66.5 %	44.0 %
7	Tempelhof-Schöneberg	70.1 %	60.9 %	98.2 %	81.2 %	69.4 %	62.5 %	53.4 %
8	Neukölln	74.1 %	61.8 %	97.8 %	84.3 %	74.4 %	58.9 %	60.7 %
9	Treptow-Köpenick	44.3 %	26.1 %	98.4 %	85.6 %	63.8 %	58.6 %	58.5 %
10	Marzahn-Hellersdorf	33.4 %	22.8 %	98.3 %	82.5 %	57.5 %	52.4 %	55.8 %
11	Lichtenberg	30.4 %	21.3 %	97.8 %	84.6 %	60.0 %	47.7 %	60.9 %
12	Reinickendorf	77.0 %	69.1 %	98.2 %	73.3 %	55.5 %	63.8 %	45.1 %
	Berlin (total)	60.1 %	48.4 %	98.2 %	83.0 %	64.3 %	56.4 %	57.6 %
	Result	Failed quoracy	Failed	Passed	Failed quoracy	Passed	Passed but overridden by state	Passed

Legend: Percentages indicate the share of 'yes' voters in the referendums.
Colours of the borough numbers: former West Berlin, former East Berlin, contains former East and West territories

== Past borough-level initiatives ==
=== Mitte ===
In 2008, a Mitte citizens' decision against parking charges failed to achieve quoracy.

=== Friedrichshain-Kreuzberg ===
In 2008, the "Spreeufer für alle!" (Spree riverfront for all!) citizens' decision passed with 87% 'yes' votes. It asked the borough of Friedrichshain-Kreuzberg to block construction on the banks of the Spree river by the Mediaspree project. Five years later, the borough government was criticised for implementing it only partially.

In 2016, a citizens' decision to block a costly refurbishment of the Landwehr Canal's Fraenkelufer failed to achieve quoracy.

=== Tempelhof-Schöneberg ===
In 2009, a citizens' decision passed in the borough of Tempelhof-Schöneberg to award monument protection to the former Tempelhof Airport, which had been shut in 2008. This was followed by a Berlin-wide referendum in 2014, the Tempelhofer Feld referendum.

=== Treptow-Köpenick ===
In 2014, a citizens' decision kept parking in the Treptow-Köpenick borough free of charge.

== See also ==
- Referendums in Germany
