= Water supply and sanitation in Italy =

Data
- Sanitation coverage (broad definition): 85%
- Share of collected wastewater treated: About 65%
- Continuity of supply: 15% suffer service interruptions (2004)
- Average urban water use (L/person/day): 214 (2022), according to ISTAT
- Average urban water and sanitation tariff (US$/m^{3}): €478/month (2023)
- Annual investment in WSS: 600m Euros/year (ca. 2000), or 11 Euros/capita/year
- Non-revenue water: 38%

Institutions
- Responsibility for policy setting: Ministry of Environment
- Sector law: Galli Law (L.36/94)
- Service providers: 3,351 (2009)

Water supply and sanitation in Italy is characterized by mostly good services at prices that are lower than in other European countries with similar income levels. For example, the average monthly residential water and sewer bill in Italy is 20 Euro compared to 31 Euro in France. According to the OECD, water in Italy has been underpriced for a long time. With about 240 liter per day, per capita water use for residential uses in Italy is higher than in Spain or in France, where it is about 160 liter per day. Water resources in Italy are distributed unevenly, with more abundant resources in the North and scarcer resources in the South. Most water withdrawals are for agriculture and industry, with only 18 percent of water withdrawals made for drinking water supply. About one third of the water withdrawn for municipal supply is not billed to the customers because of leakage, malfunctioning water meters and water theft.

The relatively low water tariffs had been made possible by government subsidies for investments. However, because of high debt levels the government has been unable to sustain these subsidies, and investments thus have declined to a level that may make it hard to sustain service quality with an ageing infrastructure. It also makes it hard to improve service quality where necessary, such as in parts of Southern Italy where water supply is intermittent, or in areas where drinking water is naturally contaminated, such as in parts of Latium. The Italian government has embarked on a bold reform process of the Italian water sector by passing the Galli Law in 1993. The law aimed at consolidating municipal service providers into regional utilities, separating service provision from regulation, achieving cost recovery from tariffs, and improving efficiency. More than twenty years after the passing of the Galli Law, regional utilities have been created and regulation is in the hands of regional governments that are separate from the utilities. However, investment levels and efficiency still remain low, putting service quality at risk.

== Modern history ==
=== Before 1994: A challenging situation ===
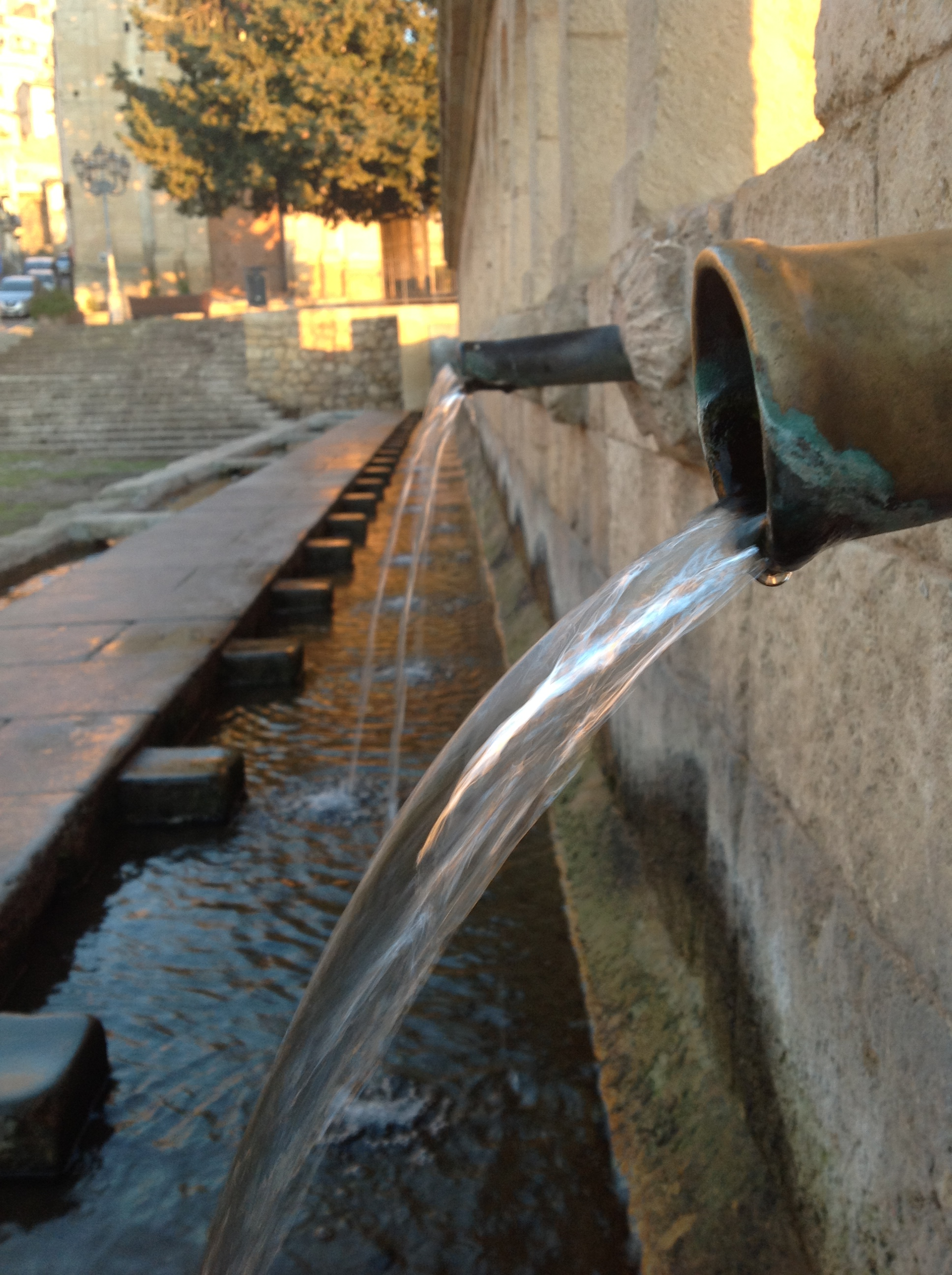
There are many public fountains in Italy that provide drinking water for free, such as the Granforte fountain in Liunforti (Sicily) shown here.

Before 1994, the Italian water and sanitation sector was highly fragmented with about 13,000 local water and sanitation service providers, often providing water and sewer services separately in the same locality. Municipalities were both service providers and regulators, creating a conflict of interest. Investments were typically financed through government subsidies, while recurrent costs of service provision were covered by tariff revenues. Tariffs were accordingly much lower than for example in France or in Germany. Furthermore, Italian utilities often provided and still do provide water at public fountains for free. However, because of high debt levels the government was less and less able to provide the subsidies to maintain the existing infrastructure and to improve service quality. The latter was particularly poor in Southern Italy where water supply was often intermittent. Furthermore, wastewater was often being discharged without treatment or with insufficient treatment. In order to comply with the EU Wastewater Directive of 1991, new expensive investments in wastewater treatment were necessary in addition to investments needed to maintain the ageing infrastructure. These investments were to be financed by the water service providers using their own resources instead of government subsidies. In order to make this possible, on the one hand tariffs were to be increased. On the other hand, service providers were to become more efficient, reducing recurrent costs and non-revenue water so that a higher share of their revenues would become available for investments to maintain and improve service quality. Investments in wastewater treatment and bulk water supply were to be planned in a more rational way within the boundaries of river basins. Furthermore, fragmented service provision by municipalities was to be consolidated in regional utilities that were expected to be more efficient. Each local government on its own would not give up the responsibility for water supply, and mayors were reluctant to increase water tariffs for fear of losing votes. Therefore, the national government prepared a law that would force municipalities to regroup themselves and form regional utilities, as well as to achieve cost recovery from tariff revenues. Under the planned law, regional governments would have an important role in setting the geographic boundaries of the new regional utilities.

Very few European countries have passed a water and sanitation services law at the national level. The planned law thus had only one precedent in Europe, and that precedent happened two decades earlier: In England and Wales municipal water and sanitation services were regrouped into ten Regional Water Authorities established along river basin boundaries through the Water Act of 1973. In the Netherlands the number of water service providers had been consolidated over a period of four decades into ten regional water companies, but this evolution was gradual and was not triggered by a law. In other European countries such as in Spain, France, Germany or Austria the water sector remained highly fragmented without any intervention by the national government into how water and sanitation services were organized at the local level. Therefore, the Italian approach to reorganize and modernize a local service such as water supply and sanitation through a law at the national level was quite bold and almost unprecedented.

=== The Galli Law of 1994: An attempt to modernize the water sector ===
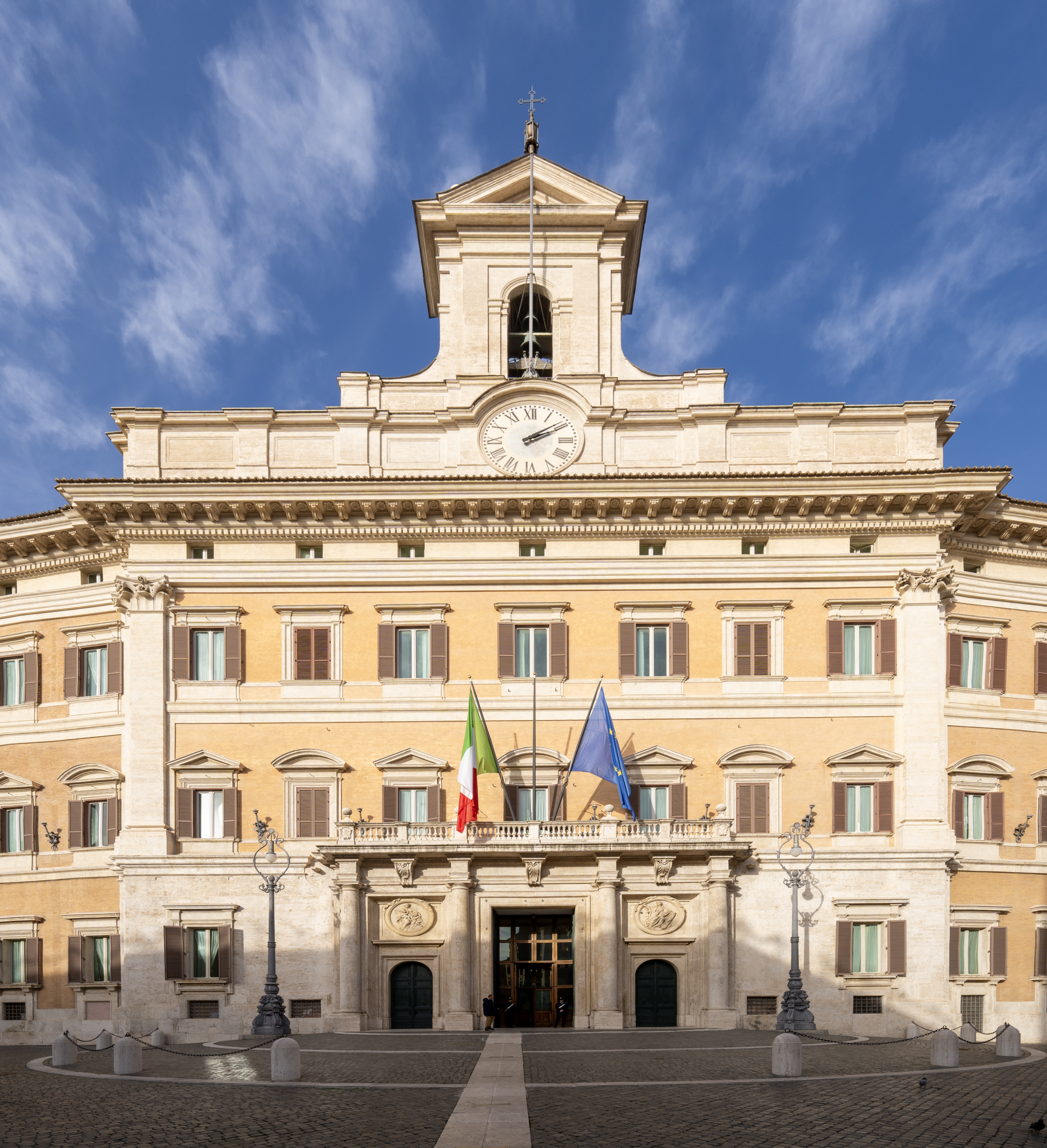
Palazzo Montecitorio, seat of the Chamber of Deputies that passed the Galli Law in 1994. The law set the basis for a fundamental restructuring and the modernization of the Italian water sector.

After ten years of producing and discussing various bills, in December 1993, under the government of Prime Minister Carlo Azeglio Ciampi (April 1993-May 1994), the Italian Parliament passed the Galli Law (L.36/94) named after the Parliamentarian who spearheaded the law. The short-lived Ciampi government that passed the law was a coalition government consisting of technocrats. At a time of rapidly changing governments, corruption scandals, political fragmentation and high levels of government debt, the Galli Law was one of several laws passed as part of important economic and political reforms in Italy at the time.

The aim of the law was to modernize water supply and sanitation in Italy. The law had three specific aims:

- it set full cost recovery from tariff revenues as a goal, something that was already the norm at that time in advanced EU countries such as France, Germany and England. It also included a controversial obligation that the remuneration of capital, including of public capital, should be included in the calculation of tariffs.
- it aimed at creating regional utilities, overcoming the fragmentation of the sector into thousands of service providers. Somewhat oddly, the new utilities were to be regulated by one newly established regional water authority for each new regional utility.
- it allowed the privatization of regional utilities through concessions as an option.
- it separated regulatory functions from service provision.
- it aimed at integrating water supply and sanitation utilities that had often been functionally separated, into single utilities.

To implement the law Italy's 20 regional governments were required to define “Optimal Service Areas” (Ambiti territoriali ottimali, ATO) that would be covered by the new regional utilities. Each ATO would comprise a group of municipalities. In each one, an authority called AATO was to be created that would set tariffs, establish an investment plan as well as a business plan, and award a concession to one public or private service provider. The AATO would monitor and regulate a single service provider in its area. The Galli Law thus, for the first time, introduced clear policies for water supply and sanitation in Italy at the national level. However, it was based on a technocratic vision that was in many respects at odds with the Italian reality.

=== Implementing the Law: Delays and regional differences ===
Only four months after the Galli Law had been passed, the government changed and Silvio Berlusconi was elected Prime Minister for the first time for a short period. The rapid succession of governments thereafter led to a first delay in the implementation of the law. Only when during the 1996-2001 period three centre-left governments from the Olive Tree Coalition ruled Italy, implementation of the law picked up. For example, during this time a method to calculate water tariffs, the Metodo Tariffario Normalizzato (MTN), was specified through a decree in 1996. It fixed a standard of 7% for capital remuneration, a level that may have been appropriate at that time before the introduction of the Euro and falling interest rates. However, that rate was never updated after the introduction of the Euro in 1999, and its high level contributed to make the capital remuneration clause of the law unpopular among those that were primarily concerned with keeping tariffs affordable.

Until 1999 all but one of the regional governments had passed legislation to create ATOs, in compliance with the Galli Law. However, only about half the ATOs had actually been created by then. The AATOs then were supposed to award concessions. This could be done through tenders, but also directly to private companies or even to the existing or newly created public utilities. Some also sold parts of the shares in their local utilities. Ultimately none of the regional utilities was fully privatized. While many of the 91 regional utilities remained entirely public, many were partially privatized. For example, in Rome the regional company Acea, the largest in Italy, was partially privatized in 1999. The companies that entered the market were mostly foreign, such as Suez Environnement, Veolia Environnement and Saur from France as well as Thames Water from Britain. The implementation of the law varied from one area of Italy to another. In the North, there are strong municipal utilities and a tradition of local government. The creation of regional authorities thus faced resistance there. In some Northern regions, the law was not implemented for a long time, keeping municipal utilities in place. In the Centre and the South, the Galli Law was implemented faster than in the North.

Furthermore, the implementation of the Galli Law diverged from the original plan. For example, the boundaries of ATOs were supposed to be drawn based on various criteria including river basin boundaries, in line with the principles of integrated water resources management. However, in reality most boundaries of utilities were drawn along administrative boundaries.

=== The 2000s: More privatization attempts ===
The second government of Silvio Berlusconi (2001-2006) tried to give a second push to private sector participation. In 2001, it introduced norms that forced municipalities to award concessions to private companies, abolishing the direct award of concessions to public companies. However, faced with opposition, the norms were revised to allow direct “in-house” awards if it could be demonstrated that in-house provision was more efficient than a concession, or if utilities sold a majority share in their existing utilities. In the meantime, the foreign private companies that had entered the Italian water market in the late 1990s faced difficulties: "Foreign players including Thames Water and Saur attempted to enter the Italian market only to become embroiled in never-ending political, regulatory and legal wrangles". For example, in Arezzo, three years after the contract had been awarded in 1999, the local government asked a subsidiary of the French water company Suez to reduce its management fee because the planned financing had not been mobilized. After lengthy confrontations, the local government and the company agreed to postpone needed investments.

In 2006, when the government of Romano Prodi (2006-2008) took office, trade unions, NGOs and civic associations established the Italian Forum of Water Movements, which collected 406,000 signatures in favor of a law on water remunicipalisation. Nevertheless, the third government of Berlusconi (2008-2011) initiated a third push for privatization, this time through the Ronchi decree of November 2009. This led opponents of privatization to push for a national referendum instead of a remunicipalization law. However, paradoxically, investors also saw the Ronchi decree as an element of uncertainty that unintentionally froze private investment.

Fifteen years after the passing of the Galli law, it had become clear that the regional water authorities had not been effective. Mayors sat both on the Board of the Authorities and on the Board of regional utilities which they were supposed to regulate, creating a conflict of interest. Utilities, which have a strong information advantage over the Authorities, remained the more powerful players. The technical competence of the authorities remained weak, and investment plans were of “very poor quality (…), structured as patchwork collections of local demands rather than as strategic documents of water-basin planning.”

=== The 2010s: A successful referendum against privatization ===
In July 2010 1.4 million signatures, almost three times the legal minimum, had been collected in favor of a referendum on water privatization. In parallel to the run-up for the referendum, the government passed significant laws that changed the conditions in the water sector. Law no. 191/2009 (the Annual Public Finance Law) and Law no. 42/2010 abolished the ATO authorities, a core element of the Galli law of 1994. At the time, there were 91 authorities, of which 69 had awarded concessions. Regional governments now had to play the role of the sector regulator, but many of them failed to play that role adequately. Still under the Berlusconi government and just one month before the referendum, the “Decreto Sviluppo” established a National Water Agency in May 2011. The Agency took over some important regulatory functions related to tariffs. Other regulatory powers remained with the regional governments.

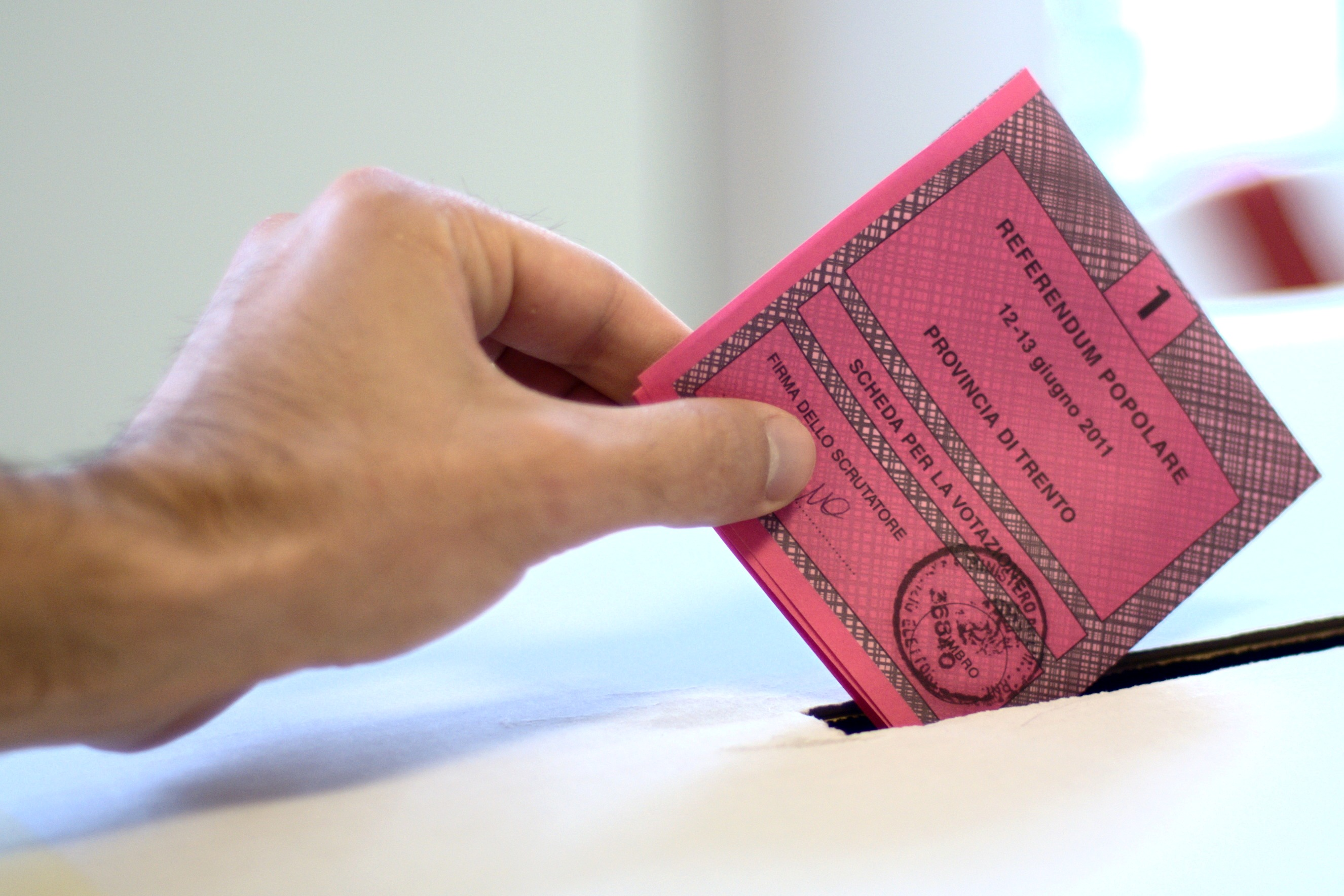
In the June 2011 referendum Italians voted against water privatization.

In June 2011, a double referendum abrogated compulsive competitive tendering and the requirement to remunerate the capital of utilities when setting tariffs. More than 27.6 million Italians voted, 95% of them against water privatisation. The referendums thus moved the legal framework back to the original Galli Law. The Berlusconi government, in office until November 2011, then tried to reintroduce norms abolished by the referendum through the back door, but was prevented from doing so through a 2012 Supreme Court decision. In December 2011 the government integrated the new National Water Agency into the existing Italian Regulatory Authority for Electricity and Gas, now renamed Italian Regulatory Authority for Electricity, Gas and Water through Law 214/11.

The Italian political scientist Andrea Lippi argues that "most of the essential prerequisites (for the Galli reforms to succeed) were missing", in particular "a cultural background for regulation, as in planning expertise, as well in control approach" and "an emergent market for water and sanitation service including private players". According to him, the Galli law had "offered Italian politicians a solution to escape away from a persistent legitimacy problem" by "adopting an innovative and fashionable legal framework" that was ultimately unable to fulfill the strong expectations for improvement that it had created.

== Water resources ==
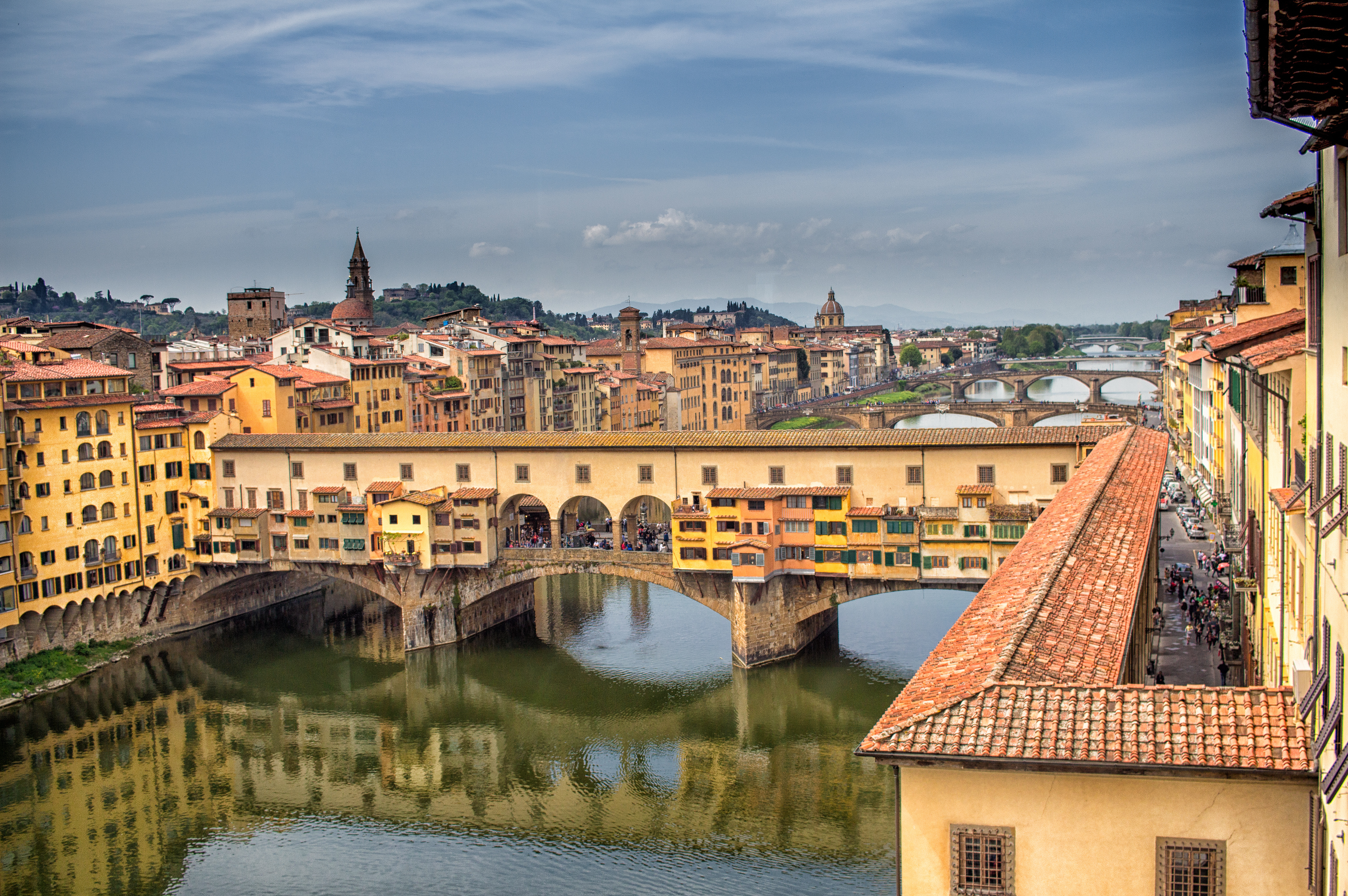
While most Italian cities receive water from wells and springs, some cities depend for their water supply on rivers such as the Arno River that supplies Florence.

Available water resources are estimated to be 58 billion cubic meters/year, 72% of which from surface water and 28% from groundwater. Almost 53% of the utilizable surface resources are in northern Italy, 19% in central Italy, 21% in southern Italy, and 7% in the two largest islands. About 70% of the underground resources is in the large flood plains of northern Italy, while groundwater in southern Italy is confined in the short stretches of coastal plains and in a few inner areas. Water is particularly scarce in Apulia, Basilicata, Sicily and Sardinia, a fact that could be aggravated by the effects of climate change.

Many Italian cities receive their drinking water from groundwater and springs. For example, Rome receives 97% of its drinking water from springs and 3% from wells. Milan receives its drinking water from 433 wells in the vicinity of the city. However, other Italian cities get most of their drinking water from rivers. For example, Florence gets most of its drinking water from the Arno River, and the Naples region receives its drinking water through the Western Campania Aqueduct from the Gari River.

== Water use and service quality ==
The volume of water withdrawn for municipal water supply was 9.5 billion cubic meters in 2012, accounting for about 18 percent of total water withdrawals. After deducting losses during water treatment, 8.4 billion of cubic meters of water enter the municipal distribution networks. After taking into account water losses (or, more precisely, non-revenue water), 5.2 billion cubic meters of water were delivered to the users, corresponding to 241 liters per capita per day. This is higher than in France and almost twice as high as in Germany.

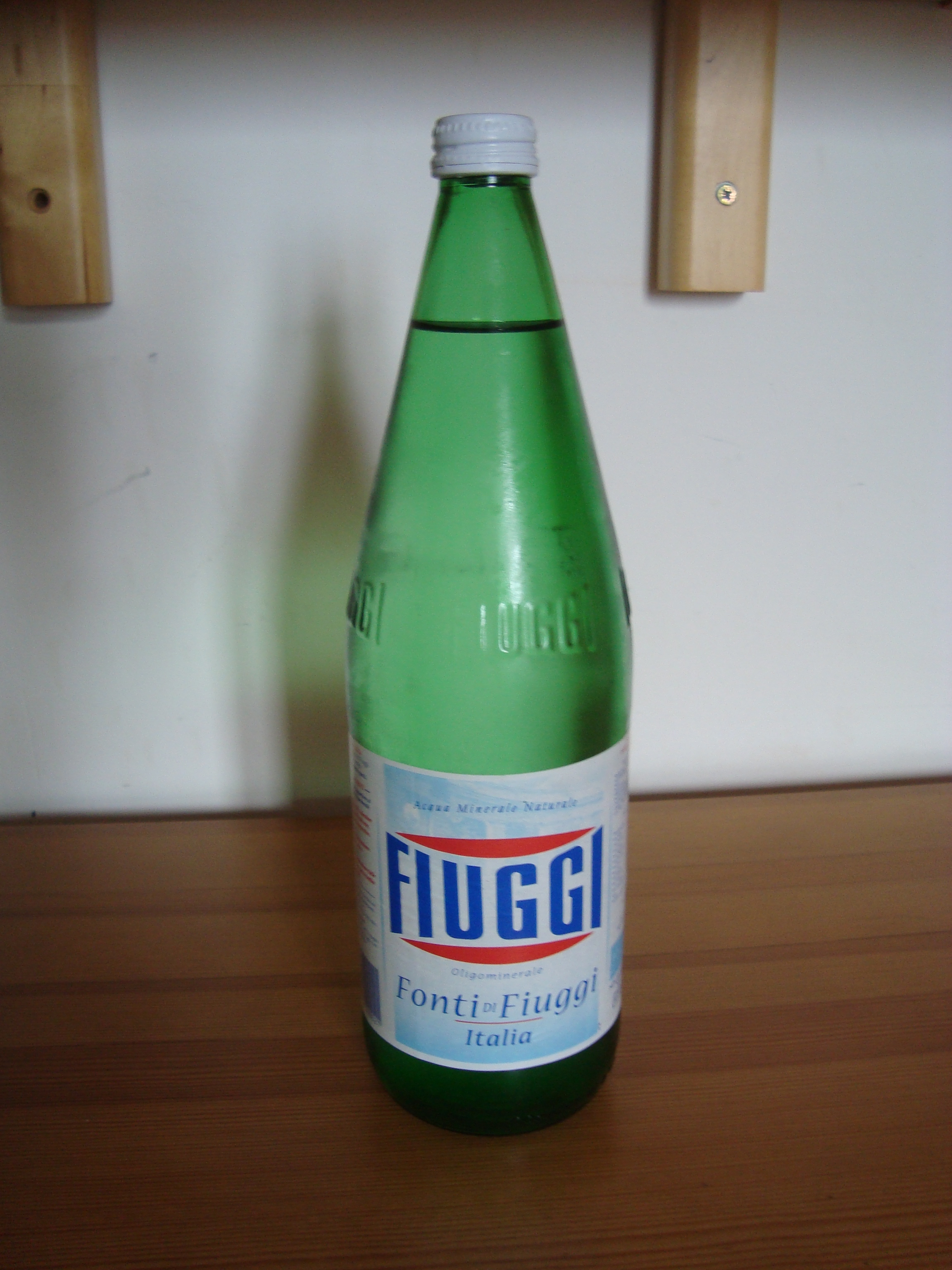
Italians are among the greatest consumers of bottled water in the world.

Bottled water. Italians are among the greatest consumers of bottled water in the world, drinking 194 liters (51 gallons) per capita a year, according to Giorgio Temporelli, research director of the environmental foundation AGMA.

Wastewater treatment. Several Italian cities are in breach of EU wastewater treatment standards. Therefore, the European Commission sued the Italian government at the European Court of Justice in 2010 and again in 2012. As of 2010, 178 towns and cities in Italy with more than 15,000 inhabitants are in breach of wastewater standards. These included Reggio Calabria, Lamezia Terme, Caserta, Capri, Ischia, Messina, Palermo, San Remo, Albenga and Vicenza. Furthermore, 143 towns with less than 15,000 inhabitants across the country were still not connected to a suitable sewage system and/or lacked secondary treatment facilities, or had insufficient treatment capacity.

Natural contamination. In 37 supply zones in Latium the level of arsenic and fluoride in drinking water is higher than the allowable limits due to natural contamination. In order to comply with the EU Drinking Water Directive, the Italian government had to provide treatment facilities to reduce the contamination below allowable limits. Despite a derogation, the government did not do this. In this case as well, the European Commission sued the Italian government at the European Court of Justice in 2014.

Supply disruptions. Drinking water supply disruptions were experienced by about 15 per cent of families in 2004, with the highest figures being registered in southern Italy, where almost a quarter of users complained of supply problems.

== Infrastructure ==
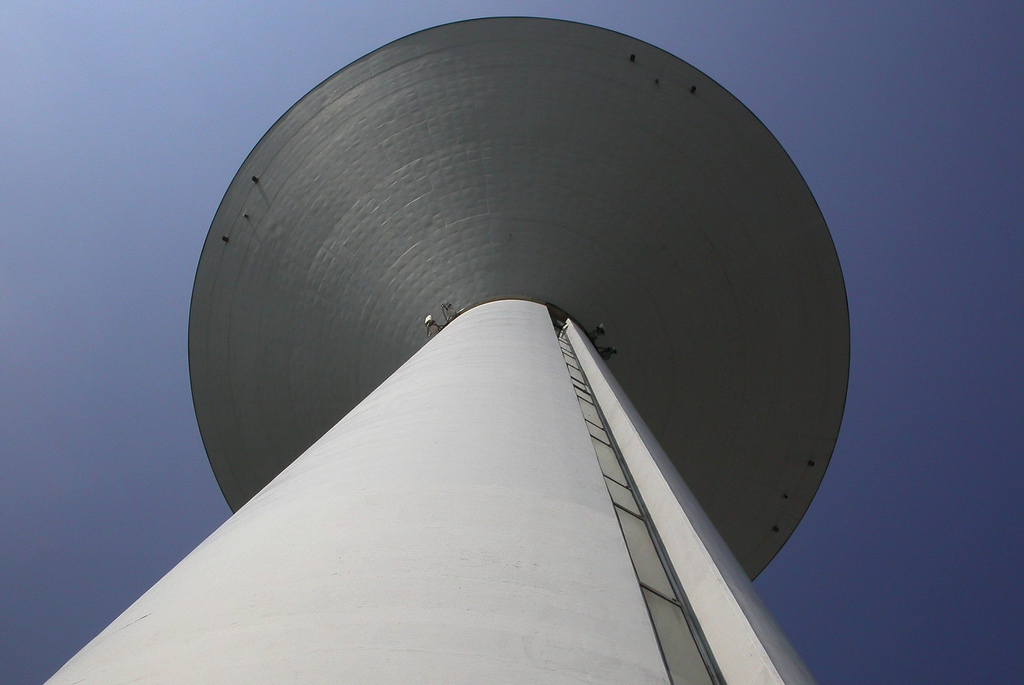
Main water tower in the Emilia region.

The length of the water network was 337,459 km and the length of the sewer network is 164,473 km in 2008. As of 2012, there were 18,786 wastewater treatment plants in Italy, of which 18,162 (97%) were in operation. 542 municipalities with 2.3 million people (4% of the population) had no sewerage.

== Responsibilities in the sector ==
=== Policy and regulation ===
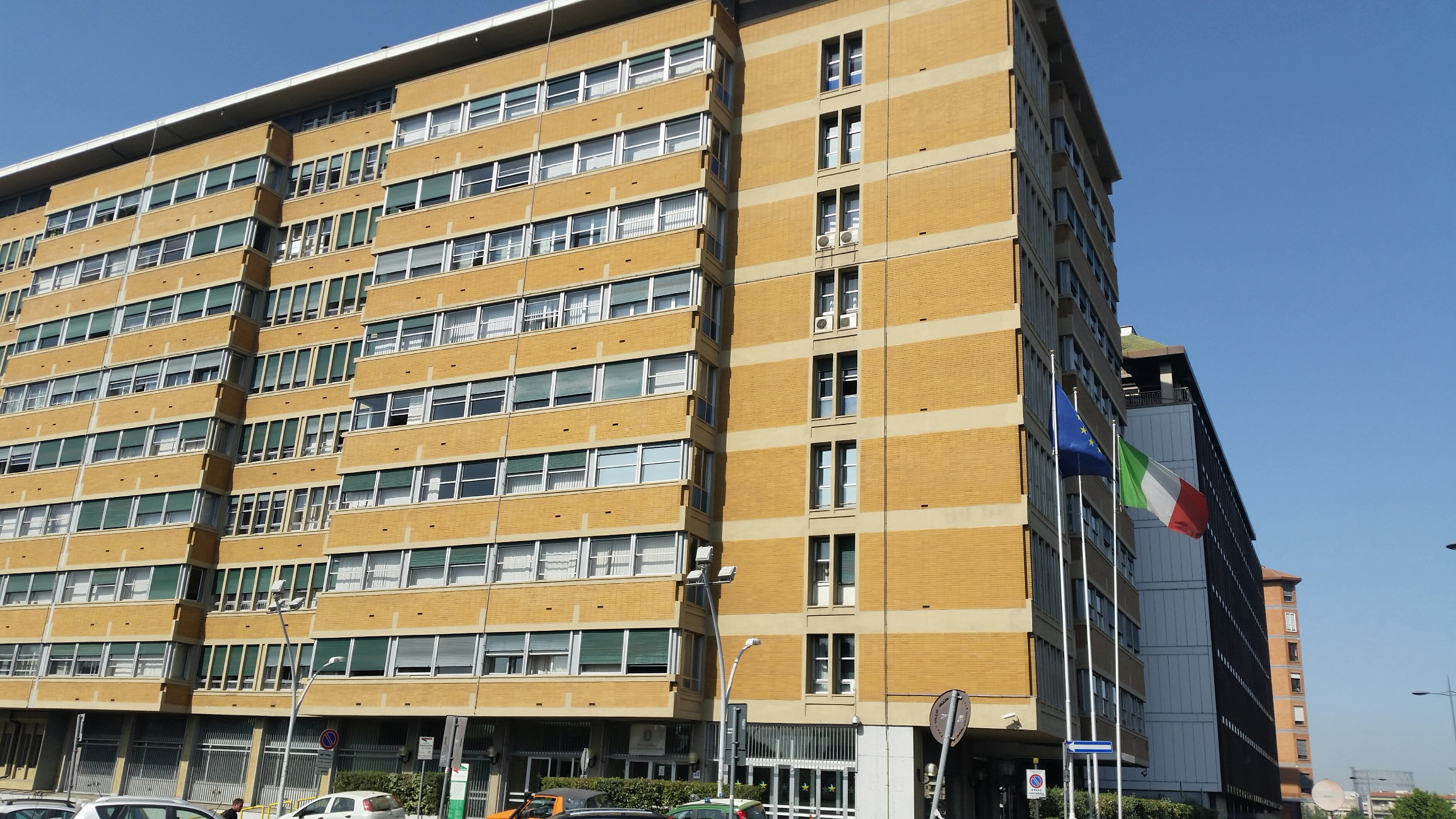
The Ministry of Environment in Rome is in charge of defining water and sanitation policy in Italy.

Within the executive branch of the Italian government the Ministry of Environment and Protection of Land and Sea (Ministero dell'Ambiente e della Tutela del Territorio e del Mare, also known as MATTM) is in charge of water and sanitation policy. It is being advised by a committee called COVIRI (Comitato di Vigilanza sull’uso delle Risorse Idriche). The Italian Regulatory Authority for Electricity Gas and Water (L'Autorità per l'energia elettrica il gas ed il Sistema Idrico, AeegSI), an autonomous entity created by law, is tasked with defining uniform criteria for the setting of water tariffs. Water tariffs should be set in such a way that they provide incentives for higher investments while keeping water affordable for “vulnerable customers”. The 20 regional governments also have important regulatory powers. They are supposed to define investment plans as well as business plans of utilities and to monitor their implementation.

=== Service provision ===
In 2012, the management of urban water services was entrusted to 3,161 service providers operating in 8,067 municipalities, according to Istat. However, only a few large service providers serve the majority of the population. Thus most Italians are served by one of the 91 regional water and sewer utilities, each covering an optimal service area (ATO) and operating under a concession from the regional government. Here are some examples:

- AQP serves 338 municipalities in the Apulia and Basilicata regions,
- SMAT serves 286 in the Turin area of the Piedmont region,
- Italgas serves 283 in the Naples area in the Campania region,
- CAP serves 194 in the Milan area in the Lombardy region, and
- ACEA serves 66 in the Rome area in the Lazio region.

The sizes of the ATOs differ significantly. For example, Tuscany with a population of almost four million has only one ATO, while Abruzzo with a population of 1.2 million has six. A full list of ATOs can be found in the article Ambito territoriale ottimale on the Italian Wikipedia.

Many utilities in Italy are multi-utilities that provide energy, water and sanitation, with most of their revenues coming from the energy side (electricity and gas). Utilities can be publicly owned, privately owned or under mixed ownership. An example of a mixed-ownership multi-utility is ACEA, which serves - among others - Rome. It is owned by the municipality (51%), the Italian investor Caltagirone (16%), the French multinational company Suez Environnement (12.5%) and by other shareholders. Its stocks are traded on the stock market. Other examples are the Hera Group and A2A, both of which are owned by Northern Italian municipalities as well as institutional investors and small shareholders. Both companies are listed on the stock market.

The world's two largest water companies, both based in France, have a strong presence in Italy. Veolia Environnement has several subsidiaries. These include Sagidep which operates mainly in the Northwest, SAP which operates mainly in the Liguria area around Genova, and Sicea which operates in Piemont and in the region around Rome (Lazio). Veolia also holds a minority share in the municipal water provider in the Tuscan city of Lucca. Furthermore, it owns shares in two bulk water providers, Sorical in Calabria and Sicilacque in Sicily. Suez Environnement holds 12.5% of Acea, the water and power utility in charge of the Rome area serving 9 million customers.

FederUtility, a trade association, represents the interests of energy and water utilities.

== Financial aspects ==
=== Tariffs and cost recovery ===
According to the 2015 global water tariff survey by the magazine Global Water Intelligence, the average residential water tariff in Italy for a consumption of 15 cubic meters per month (including wastewater and sales tax) was "among the lowest in Western Europe" at US$1.71 per cubic meter, with large differences between cities. The survey includes five Italian cities: Genova (US$2.59), Milan (US$0.80), Naples (US$1.48), Palermo (US$2.13) and Rome (US$1.85). In Rome, tariffs had increased by 14% compared to 2014, while tariffs in Palermo remained unchanged and tariffs in the other three cities increased by between 3 and 6%.

The estimated annual turnover of the Italian water service industry was about 6.5 billion Euro in 2009. For about 5.5 billion cubic meters of water distributed this corresponds to revenues of almost 1.20 Euro per cubic meter, much lower than the estimate from the global water tariff survey. The degree of cost recovery in water supply and sanitation is low. The OECD, in its Economic Survey on Italy of 2011, wrote that «water has been underpriced for a long time and both price controls and the organisational structure have prevented a rational use of resources».

=== Investment and financing ===
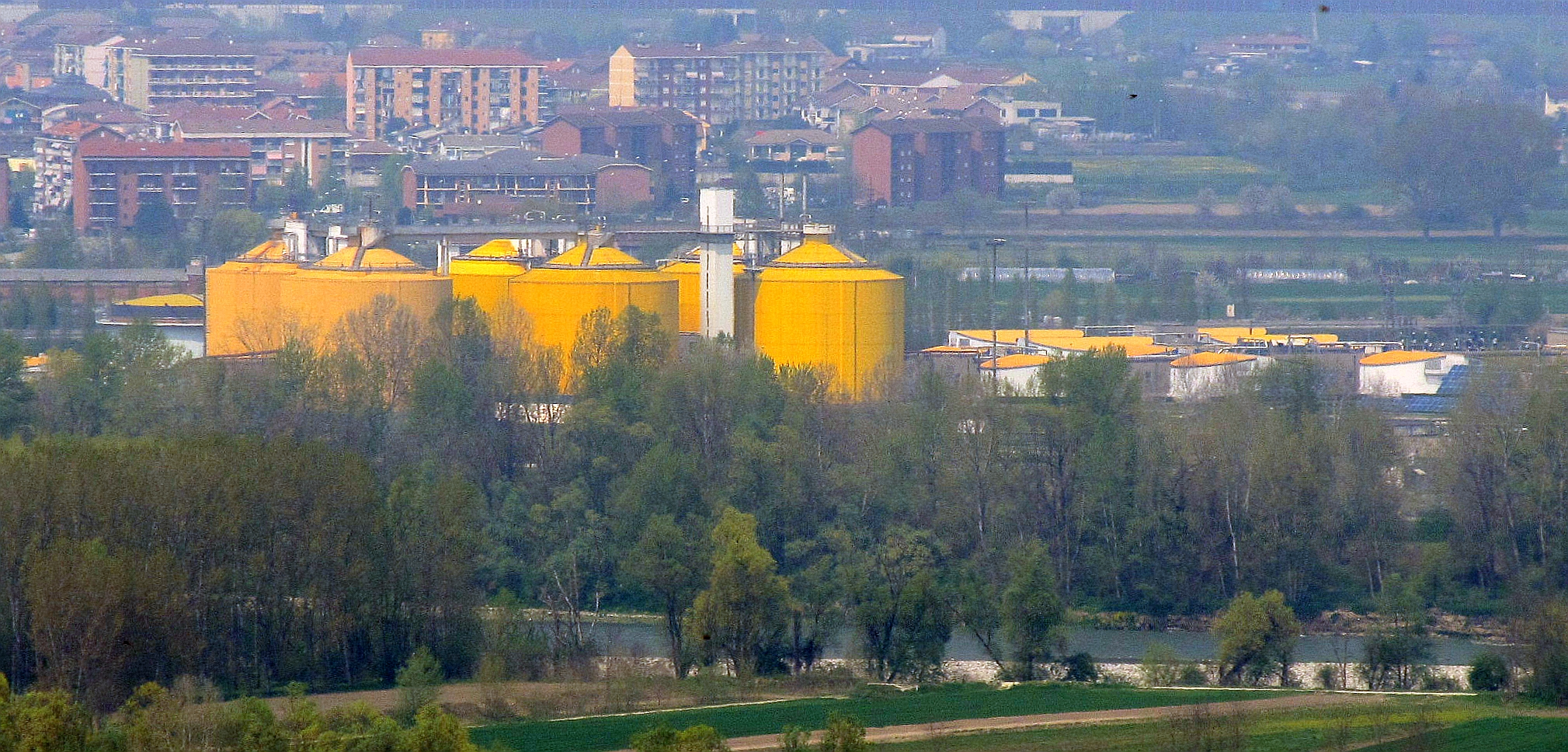
Investments in the Italian water sector are required particularly in wastewater treatment plants, such as the one shown here in Turin.

Investments fell by more than 70 per cent over the course of the 1990s, dropping from approximately €2.0 billion to around €0.6 billion a year: A study commissioned by the government and published in 2006 noted: "The fall in investment occurred precisely at a time when applicable European environmental directives required, on the contrary, an increase in investment. (...) The challenge for the sector is (...) to more than triple the current level of investment, without being able to rely any longer on the contribution of public funds at a level comparable with the past."

Most investments were historically financed by local taxes or by cross-subsidies from local energy utilities. In line with government policy, between 2004 and 2014 water tariffs in some cities increased, for example from 1.20 to 1.60 Euro per cubic meter in Florence. However, many local politicians are reluctant to raise water tariffs, even if such increases are foreseen in the business plans of regional utilities. Water tariffs thus remain much lower than in the UK, France, Germany or Austria. The average water bill of a household using 100 cubic meters per year was only 11 Euro per month in 2011, according to the Blue Book of the Italian water sector published by the research group Utilitatis. The Blue Book estimated the need for investments in the sector for the next 30 years at 64 billion Euro (about 2.1 billion Euro/year). Half of the investment is for maintenance. Expected public funding will cover only 11% of the total. The remainder is expected to come from private funding. However, ATO business plans do not provide room for more debt. Only a small share of investments can be financed by EU grants that are only available for some regions like Sardinia and Sicily.

In 2022, a loan of €200 million was provided by the European Investment Bank, to Abbanoa, the primary water utility of Sardinia. This loan assisting a multi-year investment plan to repair the island's leaky water pipes, which lose almost 60% of the water that flows through them.

== Efficiency ==
The efficiency of water and sewer service provision in Italy is low. According to one estimate, the total inefficiencies cost 5 billion Euros per year. They include operational inefficiencies of 2 billion Euros/year, which consist of poor energy efficiency and high water losses. In 2012 the level of non-revenue water, consisting of leakage, metering and billing mistakes as well as water theft, was estimated at 38%, much higher than the 32% estimate for 2008.

According to one study, "operational efficiency is higher in those ATOs where the water service supply concession contracts that fit the schemes of the new legislative framework prevail or where the service is mostly provided by a private equity owned or by mixed public-private companies". The study covered 38 ATOs all over Italy. It measured operational efficiency by the number of employees, network length and operational costs to provide a given output.

== Impacts of climate change ==
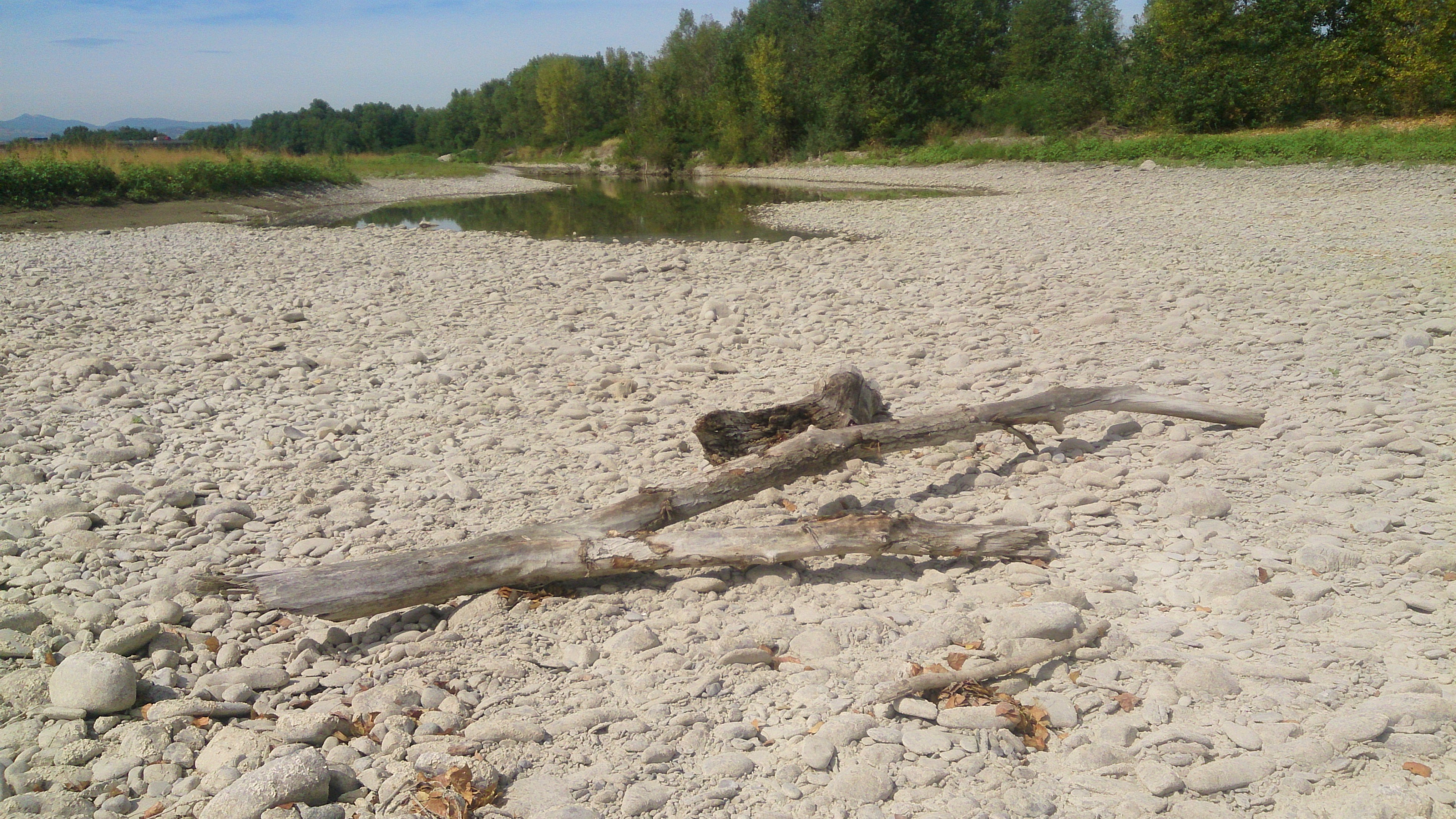
The River Trebbia, a tributary of the Po, pictured in summer 2017, is vulnerable to drought.

The expected sea level rise and risk of flooding along the Italian coastlines, constitutes a risk of groundwater contamination. The coastal fresh water beds might experience salt water intrusion of which may result in soil dryness in response to a lowered fresh water supply.

The local effects of sea level rise in coastal regions have been studied in Murgia and Salento in southern Italy. These, as well as other regions, use groundwater as their primary supply of water for irrigation and drinking. The natural rate of refilling the groundwater aquifers by freshwater is too slow, making them sensitive to overexploitation (by e.g. illegal wells) as well as the seawater intrusions. This has led to the observed salinity of up to 7 g/L in certain locations along Salento's coast. As this salination proceeds, the groundwater discharge is expected to decrease significantly, in some cases resulting in a 16% reduction in water supply aimed for household use.

In summer 2022 the government declared the drought on the River Po an emergency.
