= 2023 Berlin climate neutrality referendum =

Climate-change referendum

Climate Neutrality referendum
- 26 March 2023
- Volksentscheid Berlin 2030 klimaneutral Results

Results
Choice	Votes	%
Yes	442,028	51.06%
No	423,594	48.94%
Valid votes	865,622	99.66%
Invalid or blank votes	2,948	0.34%
Total votes	868,570	100.00%
Registered voters/turnout	2,430,076	35.74%

The 2023 Berlin climate neutrality referendum, also referred to as Berlin 2030 climate-neutral (German: Berlin 2030 klimaneutral), was a citizens' initiative launched in Berlin in 2018. It was the subject of a city-wide referendum on 26 March 2023, commonly called the Klima-Volksentscheid (English: climate referendum). Voters were asked whether the Climate Protection and Energy Transition Act of 2016 should be amended.

The primary goal of the referendum was to legislate a goal of carbon neutrality by the year 2030 rather than the existing goal of 2045. Since the referendum proposed specific amendments to the law, its result would have been legally binding. In order to pass, the proposal needed to be approved by a majority of voters and receive approval from a quorum of over 25% of registered voters.

While 50.9% of those who participated voted in favour, as turnout was approximately 18%, the 25% quorum was not met.

== Background ==
The Berlin constitution recognises and facilitates various forms of direct democracy. At the state level, a Volksinitiative (initiative) obliges the Abgeordnetenhaus of Berlin, the state parliament, to debate a petition if it collects 20,000 signatures. Furthermore, a Volksentscheid (referendum) on an initiative can be called if, during an additional signature-gathering phase, the petition is signed by 7% of registered voters.

The group Klimaneustart Berlin (English: Climate Reset Berlin) has been active since 2019 with the goal of advancing action on climate change via direct democracy. They first gathered 43,000 signatures calling on the government and parliament to declare a climate emergency, which the Abgeordnetenhaus subsequently did in December. The next year, the group collected 32,000 signatures calling for the establishment of a citizens climate council, comprising citizens chosen by sortition and advised by experts, who would develop recommendations for achieving carbon neutrality in Berlin. The proposal was legislated by the governing coalition in April 2021.

=== Initiative ===
In July 2021, Klimaneustart Berlin launched the Berlin 2030 klimaneutral initiative with the goal of bringing forward the city's net zero goal from 2045 to 2030. Unlike previous initiatives, they intended to seek a referendum on the issue. The petition received 39,000 signatures by October.

In May 2022, the state government rejected the proposal. Deputy mayor and climate minister Bettina Jarasch said that, while she shared the concerns of the initiative, the government preferred concrete measures to achieve climate protection over legislating new targets. She also described neutrality by 2030 as unrealistic if the rest of the country and the European Union were not seeking the same. This rejection enabled the initiative to enter the second signature-gathering phase which would take its proposal to referendum. Support from 7% of registered voters, approximately 171,000 people, was required. The initiative surpassed this hurdle with 260,000 signatures by the end of the gathering period in mid-November.

The state government rejected proposals that the referendum take place alongside the 2023 Berlin repeat state election on 12 February. They stated that organisation and procedural efforts could not be completed in time, and that holding the votes simultaneously could disrupt the voting process and result in irregularities; the Greens and Left factions dissented. The referendum date was set for 26 March, six weeks after the state election.

== Provisions ==
The referendum would have provided for several changes to the Berlin Climate Protection and Energy Transition Act:

- Changing the greenhouse gas emissions reduction goal to 70% from 1990 levels by 2025, and 95% by 2030. This is in contrast to the current goal of 70% by 2030 and 95% by 2045 and applies specifically to carbon dioxide emissions.
- Several provisions are to become binding obligations instead of targets.
- Tenants should receive monthly subsidies in the event of rent increases.
- Public buildings are to be renovated with clean energy systems by 2030. Measures for implementing renewable energy in buildings, such as rooftop solar panels, are to be strengthened.

== Campaign ==
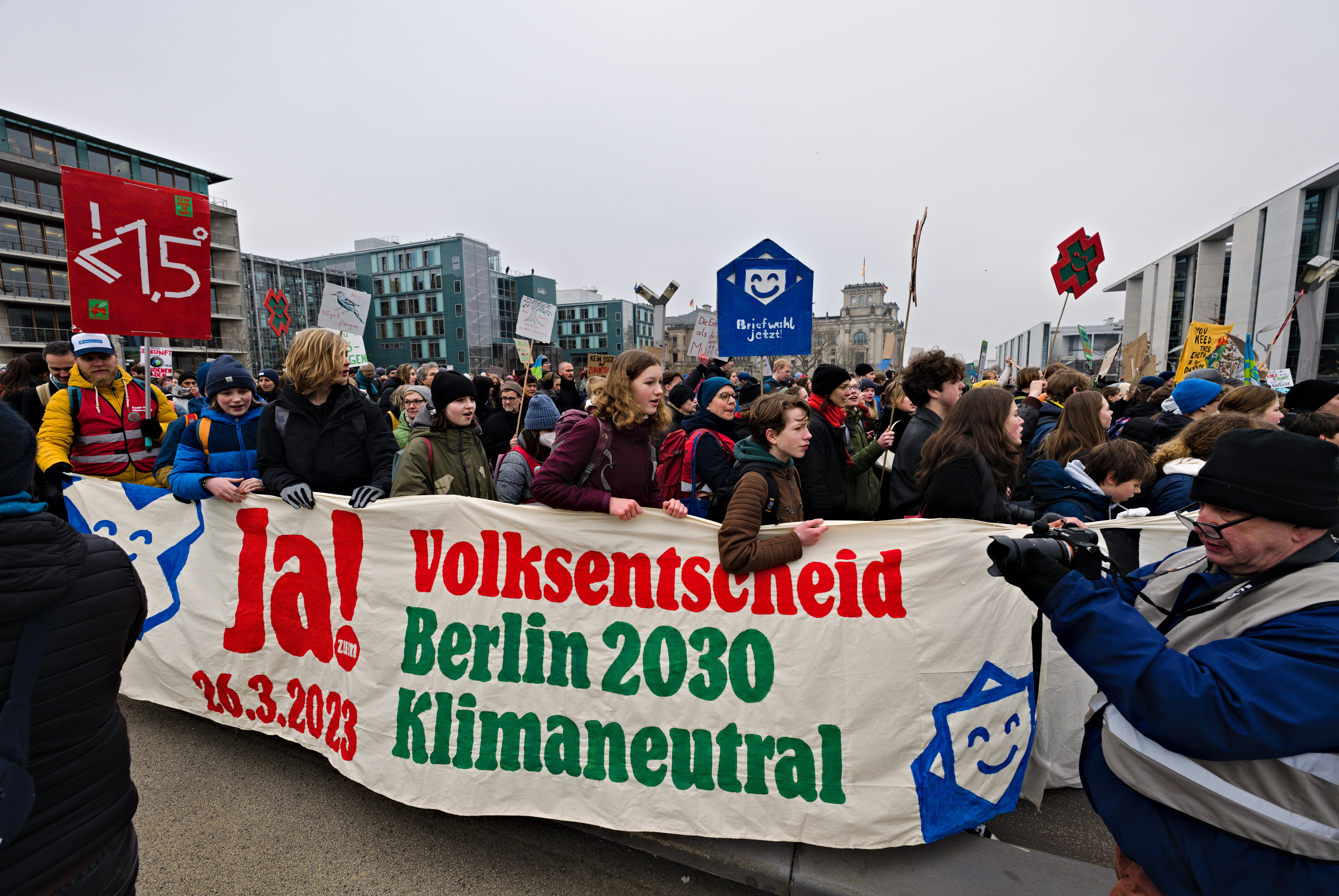
The front banner at a Fridays for Future demonstration on 3 March 2023 calling for a "Yes" vote in the referendum

The initiators of the referendum cite the consequences and damage of climate change as the reason for the need to change the law. They state that climate neutrality will ensure energy independence and future-proof jobs in the region. In addition, 100 European cities have already committed to climate neutrality by 2030. The initiative also cites several feasibility studies that argue the goal is possible. A study published by the Energy Watch Group in late 2021 suggested that Berlin could source its energy needs entirely from renewable sources, provided that areas in surrounding Brandenburg are also utilised. A study commissioned from the Fraunhofer IEE institute published the same year attests that entirely climate-neutral heating could be supplied by 2035, and possibly earlier. A catalog of measures by GermanZero also proposes various local solutions to achieve the desired reduction in emissions.

The referendum was officially opposed by the parties of the city government (SPD, The Greens, and The Left), as well as the opposition CDU, AfD, and FDP. The youth branches of the Greens (Green Youth) and SPD (Jusos) endorsed it, and Green leader and deputy mayor Bettina Jarasch personally endorsed a "Yes" vote shortly before the state election in February.

Opposition to the proposal centred on doubts about its feasibility. According to them, the initiators specified a cost of €112 billion, far higher than the city's €37.9 billion annual budget but did not suggest how it would be funded. The Energy Watch Group study proposed a major expropriation of assets from wealthy citizens for this purpose; expropriation had been approved in the 2021 Berlin referendum. According to the Senate finance department, deficit spending was not possible due to the debt brake, and critics argued that cuts to important areas of spending would have to take place to implement the referendum's provisions. Additionally, as 80% of Berlin's electricity is sourced from fossil fuels, many lawmakers were concerned that seven years would not be enough to transition to renewable energy. During the coalition negotiations parallel to the referendum campaign, the CDU and SPD proposed establishing a smaller special climate fund of €5 billion, potentially increasing by another €5 billion at the end of 2024.

Support	Oppose
Companies: Ecosia; GameDuell; Idealo; Mister Spex; N26; Nebenan; Tier Mobility; Interest groups: Autofrei; Changing Cities; Die Tageszeitung; Extinction Rebellion; Fridays for Future; Generations Foundation; GermanZero; IPPNW; Friends of Nature; Scientists for Future; Political parties: The Left; Green Youth; Jusos; Klimaliste; Human Environment Animal Protection Party; Pirate Party Berlin; Volt Germany; Individuals: Bettina Jarasch	Interest groups: Berlin-Brandenburg Business Associations Union; Senate of Berlin; Political parties: Alliance 90/The Greens; Alternative for Germany; Christian Democratic Union; Free Democratic Party; Social Democratic Party

=== Opinion polling ===
A Civey poll of 3,002 Berliners conducted between 20 January and 17 February 2023 found 46.3% supported the referendum question, 42.1% opposed, and 11.6% undecided. Strong support came from Green voters (94.5%), students (76%), and Left voters (67%). 57.5% of SPD voters also favoured the referendum, compared to 15% of CDU voters.

== Referendum and results ==
Out of the city's 2.4 million voters, 35.8% participated in the referendum and 64.2% abstained. Of the 865,628 votes, a slight majority of 442,210 (50.9%) were in favour and 423.418 (48.7%) were opposed. Because the 25% threshold required at least 607,518 votes to be in favour in addition to a majority, the measure did not pass.
