= Martha Kleedörfer =

German politician (born 1998)

Member of the Berlin House of Representatives
- Assuming office 29 October 2026
- Succeeding: Tuba Bozkurt
- Constituency: Mitte 6

Personal details
- Born: 1998 (age 27–28)
- Party: Die Linke (since 2016)

Martha Kleedörfer (born 1998) is a German politician who was elected member of the Berlin House of Representatives in 2026. She has served as co-chair of Die Linke in Mitte since 2021.

== Life ==
=== Education ===
Kleedörfer grew up as the youngest daughter of a single mother who was a pediatrician's assistant. After graduating from the Hermann-Staudinger-Gymnasium in Erlenbach am Main, she moved to Berlin in 2017 to study political science (Bachelor's degree) at the Freie Universität from 2017 to 2022. She then began a Master's degree in Sociology with a focus on Technology Science at the Technische Universität Berlin in 2022.

Kleedörfer worked as an assistant to a member of the Bundestag from 2019 to 2022, and as an assistant to a member of the Berlin House of Representatives from 2022 to 2026.

=== Private ===
She became a mother in 2025.

=== Politics ===
Martha Kleedörfer (4th from right) as a member of the Executive State Board of The Left Party Berlin

Kleedörfer joined Die Linke in 2016. At the same time, she was involved in the 2021 referendum "Deutsche Wohnen & Co enteignen" in Berlin's Wedding district. In the 2021 Berlin state election, she was elected to the Mitte district assembly, where she took on the role of housing policy spokesperson for her parliamentary group. In 2021, she was also elected co-chair of the district association Mitte.

Kleedörfer was elected to the state executive committee of Die Linke as one of the four deputy chairpersons at the party's state convention in May 2025.

The district association of Die Linke in Mitte nominated Kleedörfer for the 2026 election to the House of Representatives in constituency Mitte 6 and for first place on the district list. Kleedörfer won the direct mandate with 46.2 percent and entered parliament.
