= GAGFAH =

GAGFAH S.A.
- Company type: Société Anonyme
- Traded as: FWB: GFJ
- Industry: Real estate
- Founded: 1918
- Headquarters: Luxembourg City, Luxembourg
- Key people: Jonathan Ashley (Chairman), Thomas Zinnöcker (CEO)
- Products: Investments in residential property
- Operating income: €348.3 million (2010)
- Net income: €7.7 million (2010)
- Total assets: €9.262 billion (end 2010)
- Total equity: €2.303 billion (end 2010)
- Number of employees: 1,405 (FTE, average 2010)
- Parent: Reichsversicherungsanstalt für Angestellte; German National Association of Commercial Employees
- Website: www.gagfah.com

GAGFAH (Gemeinnützige Aktiengesellschaft für Angestellten-Heimstätten) was a Luxembourg-based realty company. It owned a portfolio of more than 145,000 rental units in Germany, particularly concentrated in Dresden and Berlin.

== Overview ==
The company was brought to the stock market in October 2006 through the sale of 20% of its shares at €19 per share, at the top of the €17-€19 price range quoted in its flotation prospectus.

For a while during the 2008 financial crisis GAGFAH's share price traded as low as €2 per share (down -89% on IPO price).

In 2015, GAGFAH merged with Deutsche Annington and was renamed Vonovia.

As part of the merger terms, GAGFAH shareholders received five new shares in Vonovia and €122.52 in cash for every 14 GAGFAH shares, equating to a value of €20.39 per GAGFAH share based on Vonovia's €32.38 closing share price on 6th March 2015. In a subsequent tender offer a small number of outstanding GAGFAH shares were sold to Vonovia for €18.68 per share in cash.
