= Deutsche Wohnen & Co. enteignen =

Housing movement and referendum in Berlin

Expropriate Deutsche Wohnen & Co.
- Campaign logo
- Native name: Deutsche Wohnen & Co. enteignen
- Date: 2018–present
- Location: Berlin, Germany
- Website: dwenteignen.de

Results
Choice	Votes	%
Yes	1,035,950	59.14%
No	715,698	40.86%
Valid votes	1,751,648	97.41%
Invalid or blank votes	46,660	2.59%
Total votes	1,798,308	100.00%
Registered voters/turnout	2,447,600	73.47%
- Results by borough

The 2021 Berlin referendum on a resolution to work out a draft for a law to expropriate housing stock of big housing companies (Volksentscheid über einen Beschluss zur Erarbeitung eines Gesetzentwurfs durch den Senat zur Vergesellschaftung der Wohnungsbestände großer Wohnungsunternehmen), informally referred to as Deutsche Wohnen & Co. enteignen (English: Expropriate Deutsche Wohnen & Co.) or DW enteignen, the main campaigning claim, was a referendum held and passed in Berlin in 2021. Voters were asked if they approved of the expropriation of the property of private real-estate companies with 3,000 or more units in the city, through public purchases by the Berlin state government. This would affect 243,000 rental apartments out of 1.5 million total apartments in Berlin. The largest such real-estate company is Deutsche Wohnen, for which the initiative is named, followed by Vonovia. In total, the referendum would impact 12 large real-estate companies.

The initiative for the referendum was originally launched in 2018, but the emergence of a new tenant movement in Berlin dates back to the early 2010s, including a first rent-referendum in 2015 called "Mietenvolksentscheid". The new referendum successfully passed the first signature-collecting phase in July 2019, receiving at least 58,000 valid signatures of the 20,000 required; and the second phase in June 2021, receiving at least 175,000 of the 170,000 required.

The referendum took place on 26 September 2021 alongside the state and federal election. The expropriation proposal passed the legal quorum of 25% of eligible voters being in favour and a majority of votes, receiving the approval of 57.6% of voters, with 39.8% voters against. The result is non-binding. On 26 September 2023, exactly two years later, the campaign announced plans for a second referendum, which would be legally binding unlike the previous one.

== Background ==
Article 14 of the Basic Law states that "property entails obligations. Its use shall also serve the public good". This passage dates from 1949 and has never been used before. But the existence of an article allowing socialization was employed to advocate for pauses on rent increases or expropriation of high-volume property ownership.

Article 15 states the legal basis i.e "Grund und Boden [..] können zum Zwecke der Vergesellschaftung durch ein Gesetz [..] in Gemeineigentum.. überführt werden" (Land, natural resources and means of production may, for the purpose of socialization, be transferred to public ownership or other forms of public enterprise by a law that determines the nature and extent of compensation). Article 15 has never been used in practice.

Even if the referendum passes, it would not be legally binding, and specific language would need to be spelled out, including compensation amounts which then would need to be passed by the Berlin Senate. The German constitution says the compensation amount should balance the interests of the public and other stakeholders. It would cost taxpayers an estimated amount between 7 and 36 billion euros, based on 2021 estimations, with the higher end being market rates. If the compensation amount is on the higher end, it could diminish the initiative's effectiveness.

After the 2026 Berlin state election, won by the Left, which had campaigned with the expropriation idea, various cost estimates were discussed. A group of experts, commissioned by the state of Berlin had calculated in 2023, that, depending on the details, between 3.7 and 25.6 billion Euro would be needed. Berlins own auditors on the other hand had estimated the compensation for the expropriation alone would be 42 billion Euro. The German Confederation of Trade Unions scientific wing IMK, shortly after the 2026 Berlin election, published a study, claiming that the more than 200,000 apartments in question could be acquired by Berlin for 13.5 billion Euro: 4 billion from the state's budget and the rest financed by debt.

== First referendum ==
=== Signature collection—phase 1 ===
A total of 77,001 signatures were collected between April and July 2019. At least 58,000 of them were validated, exceeding the 20,000 signatures quorum required for a legal review by the Berlin Senate Department for the Interior and Sports.

=== Legal review ===
The legal review by the Berlin Senate took place over a period of 441 days from 4 July 2019 to 17 September 2020. Senator for Interior Geisel was accused of intentionally delaying the review by the initiative, The Left and Green parties. The text of the resolution was modified in order to be legally compliant.

=== Signature collection—phase 2 ===
A further 349,658 signatures were collected over a four month period between 26 February and 25 June 2021. At least 261,000 signatures were checked, with over 175,000 of them being legally valid, exceeding the quorum of 170,000 signatures or 7% of eligible voters (German Berlin citizens) required to initiate a public referendum. It was the highest number of signatures ever collected in a Berlin referendum.

=== Referendum vote ===
The referendum passed with over one million Berliners or 59.1% of the total vote in favour.

=== Expert commission ===
After the referendum passed, a 13 member expert commission was established to determine the constitutionality of the referendum and its compatibility with Article 15 of the Basic Law that deals with expropriation. On 28 June 2023, nearly two years later, the commission concluded in its 150 page report that landlords can be expropriated and compensated with below-market value by the Berlin government.

The coalition of CDU and SPD governing Berlin since 2023 did not draft the socialization law demanded by the referendum, but instead prepared a general framework law. On 12 March 2026, the Berlin House of Representatives passed this Socialization Framework Act (Vergesellschaftungsrahmengesetz) with the votes of the governing coalition. The law sets out conditions under which land, natural resources and means of production can be transferred to common ownership, requires such measures to be proportionate and provides for adequate compensation. It is scheduled to come into force two years after its promulgation; the coalition intends to have it reviewed by the courts before it takes effect.

== Second referendum ==
On 26 September 2023, two years after the first referendum passed, campaign organizers announced a plan for a second referendum, a legal referendum that would be legally binding in contrast with the first one.

On 26 September 2025, four years to the day after the referendum, the initiative presented its own draft socialization law. Under the draft, around 220,000 rental flats owned by large housing companies would be transferred to a public-law institution of the State of Berlin, with each company allowed to keep up to 3,000 flats. According to the initiative, a referendum vote on the law is not expected before 2027.

In July 2026, the governing federal coalition of CDU/CSU and SPD agreed to introduce a federal law that would prevent the German states from transferring private rental housing into public ownership through socialization laws, a move widely seen as a response to the Berlin expropriation debate.

== First referendum results ==
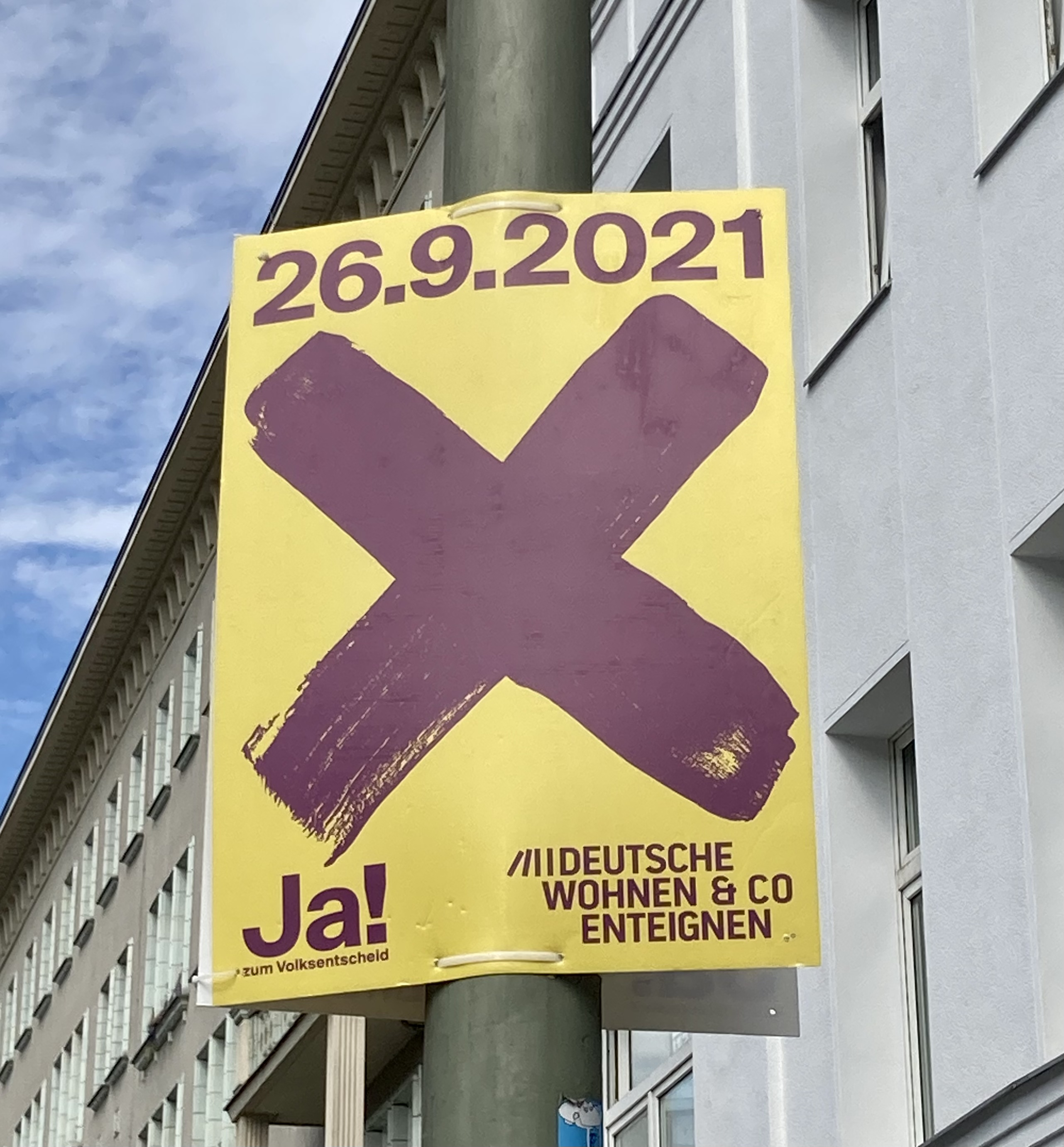
Poster for the Deutsche Wohnen & Co. enteignen campaign with the slogan "Ja! zum Volksentscheid" (Vote yes for the referendum!)

With the signature collection phase cleared, a referendum was scheduled for 26 September 2021, the same day as the Berlin state and federal elections. A majority of votes in favour of the referendum and a minimum of 25% of all eligible voters in favour were needed for the referendum to succeed, approximately 625,000 votes. In 2013, the energy referendum was approved by 83% of those who voted, but failed because only 24.2% of eligible Berlin voters, voted in favour, while quorum required 25% or more voters to pass.

Choice	Votes	%
For	1,035,950	59.14
Against	715,698	40.86
Total	1,751,648	100.00
Valid votes	1,751,648	97.41
Invalid/blank votes	46,660	2.59
Total votes	1,798,308	100.00
Registered voters/turnout	2,447,600	73.47
Source: Berlin Elections

Valid Voter Tally by District
District	Yes (Ja)		No (Nein)	
District	Voters	Percent	Voters	Percent
01 – Mitte	95,681	65.1%	47,948	32.6%
02 – Friedrichshain-Kreuzberg	95,507	74.0%	31,269	24.2%
03 – Pankow	134,389	62.1%	78,057	36.1%
04 – Charlottenburg-Wilmersdorf	84,016	51.3%	75,808	46.3%
05 – Spandau	57,345	52.7%	47,661	43.8%
06 – Steglitz-Zehlendorf	77,166	45.2%	89,532	52.4%
07 – Tempelhof-Schöneberg	93,776	54.5%	73,745	42.9%
08 – Neukölln	84,740	62.4%	47,065	34.7%
09 – Treptow-Köpenick	91,480	59.3%	58,722	38.1%
10 – Marzahn-Hellersdorf	75,956	56.7%	53,511	39.9%
11 – Lichtenberg	88,045	62.0%	50,276	35.4%
12 – Reinickendorf	57,849	46.5%	62,104	49.9%
Berlin combined	1,035,950	56.4%	715,698	39.0%

== Reception ==
	Support	Oppose
Housing groups	Berlin Tenant Association, Berlin Tenant Community.	
Political parties	The Left, Greens, JUSOS (SPD Youth)	SPD, CDU, AfD, FDP
Trade unions	IG Metall, GEW, ver.di and DGB Jugend	
Interest groups		Association of Berlin-Brandenburg Housing Companies

== Conceptual development and publications ==
The initiative Deutsche Wohnen & Co enteignen started with a one-page paper listing their demands in fall 2018, a condensed version became the text of the referendum in 2019-2021. Between 2020 and 2023 the initiative expanded its concepts of socialization step by step and published several brochures dealing from tenant organization, legal and financial requirements of expropriation to climate justice. In 2022, an edited volume published by the initiative summarized the German debate on socialization, including voices from legal experts, the Berlin Senate, trade unions and environmental organizations. The volume also included a proposed law on socialization of housing, drafted by the initiative in 2021. Since federal law in Germany knows no standardized institutional form for socialized land, the initiative in 2023 further conceptualized their model of a public law institution called "Gemeingut Wohnen" that could take over administration of socialized housing stock in Berlin.

Edited Volume

- Deutsche Wohnen & Co Enteignen: Wie Vergesellschaftung gelingt – Zum Stand der Debatte, parthas, Berlin 2022, ISBN 978-3-86964-130-0.

Brochures edited by Deutsche Wohnen & Co enteignen

- Tenant organizing: Zusammentun. Wie wir uns gemeinsam gegen den Mietenwahnsinn wehren können, Berlin 2019.
- Socialization and Economy of Commons: Vergesellschaftung und Gemeinwirtschaft – Lösungen für die Berliner Wohnungskrise, Berlin 2020.
- Gemeingut Wohnen - a Public Law Institution: Gemeingut Wohnen - Eine Anstalt öffentlichen Rechts für Berlins vergesellschaftete Wohnungsbestände , Berlin 2023.
- Climate Justice: Wohnen, Klimagerecht - Fünf Argumente, warum das nur mit einer gemeinwirtschaftlichen Wohnraumversorgung zu schaffen ist , Berlin 2023.

== Gallery ==
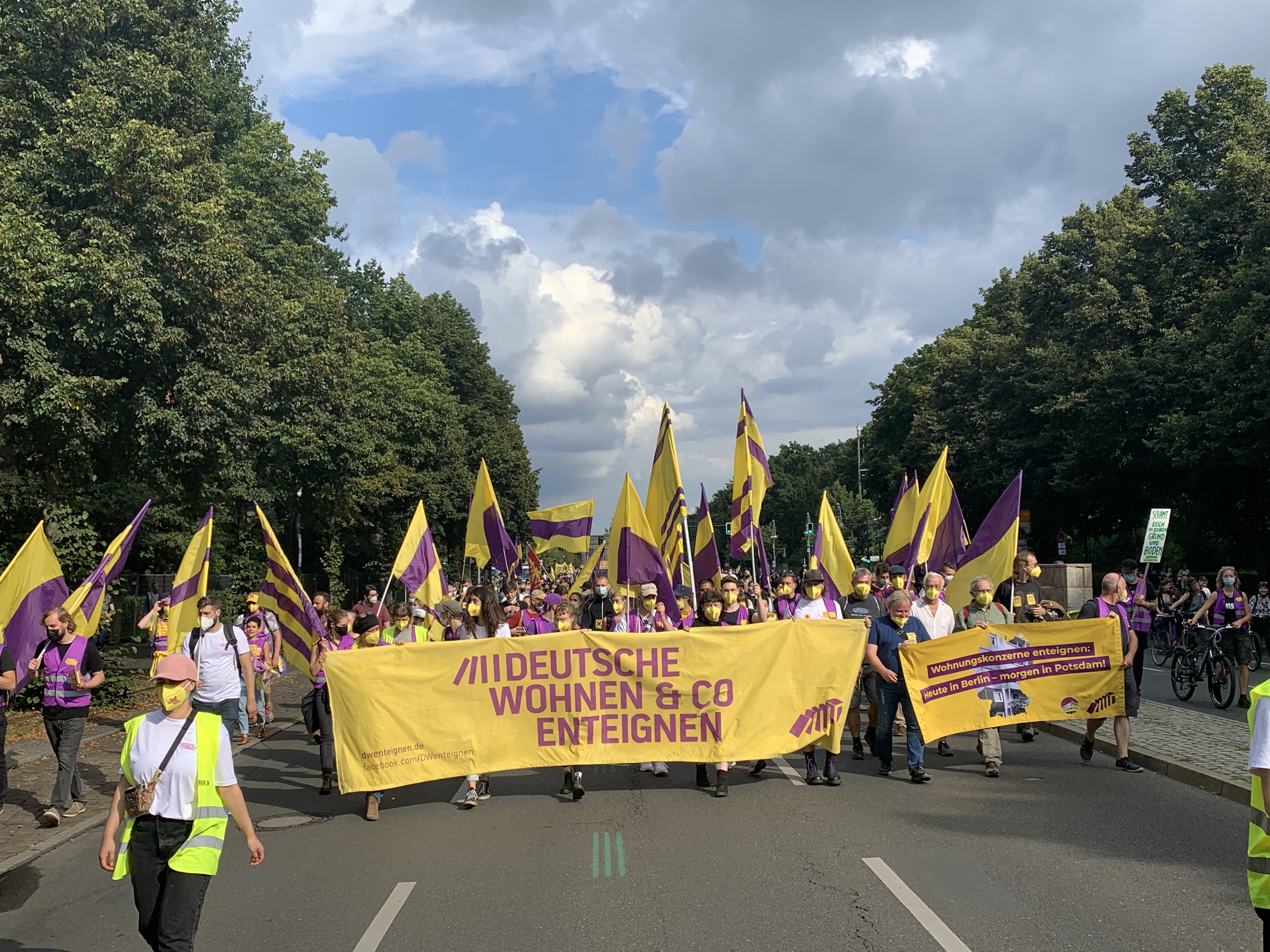

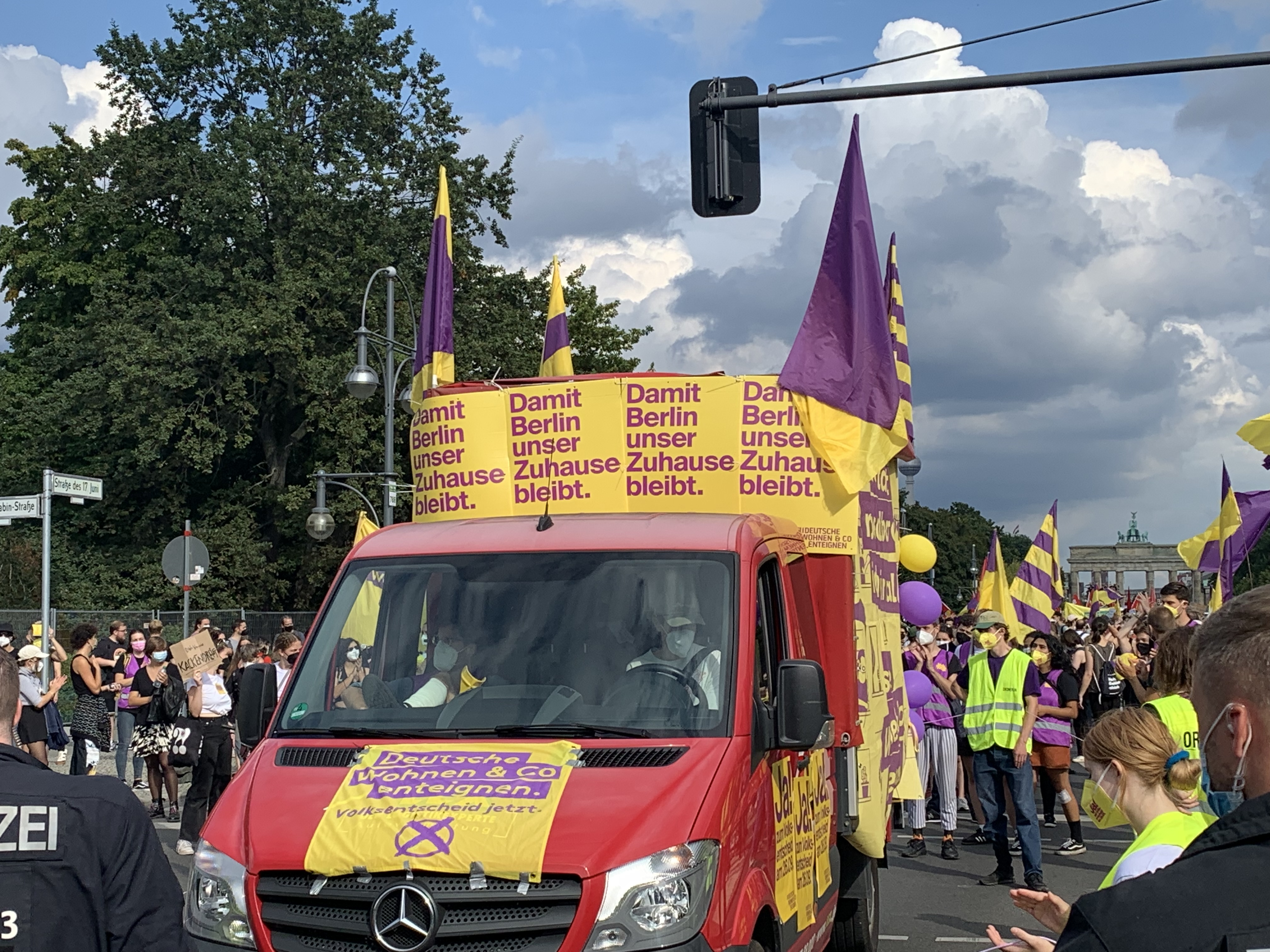

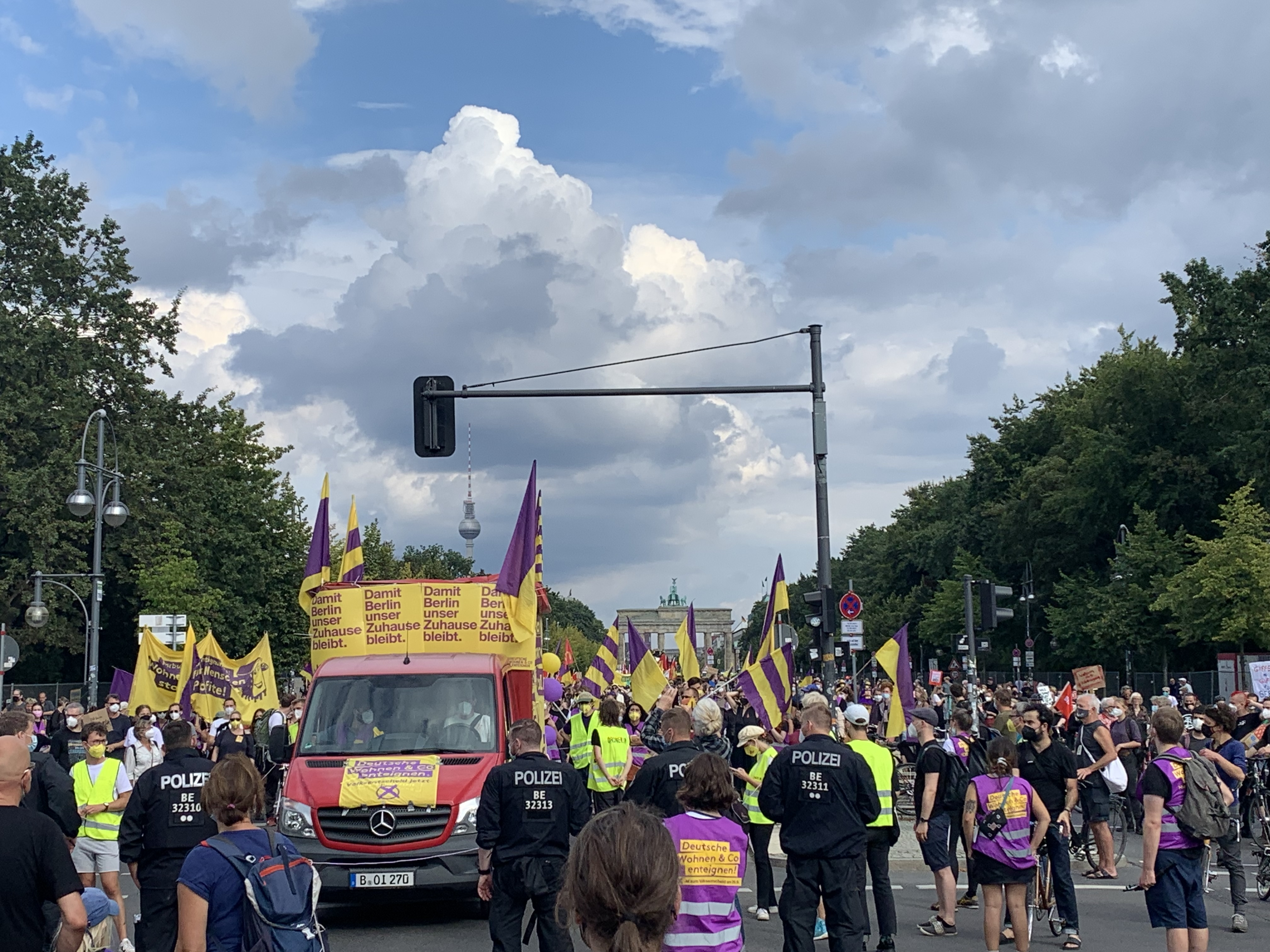

== See also ==
- Direct democracy in Berlin
