= Mitte 6 =

State electoral district of Germany

- Electoral district for the Berlin House of Representatives
- Mitte 6 in 2026
- District: Mitte
- Electorate: 28,050 (2026)

Current electoral district
- Party: The Left
- Member: Martha Kleedörfer

Mitte 6 is an electoral constituency (German: Wahlkreis) represented in the House of Representatives of Berlin. It elects one member via first-past-the-post voting.

== Geography ==
The constituency comprises the areas of Soldiner Straße and along the Panke within the borough of Mitte.

There were 28,050 eligible voters in 2026.

== Members ==
Election	Member	Party	%
2006	Ralf Wieland	SPD	39.9
2011	Ralf Wieland	SPD	32.5
2016	Ralf Wieland	SPD	25.0
2021	Tuba Bozkurt	Green	29.8
2023	Tuba Bozkurt	Green	32.0
2026	Martha Kleedörfer	Left	46.2

== Election results ==
=== 2026 election ===
State election (2026): Mitte 6
Notes:	Blue background denotes the winner of the electorate vote. Pink background denotes a candidate elected from their party list. Yellow background denotes an electorate win by a list member, or other incumbent. A ✓ or ✗ denotes status of any incumbent, win or lose respectively.						
Party	Candidate	Votes	%	±%	Party votes	%	±%
Left	Martha Kleedörfer	8,170	46.2	▲25.1	9,019	50.5	▲29.0
Greens	✗ Tuba Bozkurt	3,863	21.8	▼10.2	2,667	14.9	▼13.8
SPD	Susanne Fischer	1,646	9.3	▼6.9	1,592	8.9	▼5.9
AfD	Adam Gołkontt	1,413	8.0	▲2.3	1,422	8.0	▲2.6
CDU	Michael Kühl	1,252	7.1	▼8.0	1,310	7.3	▼7.4
BSW	Faruk Čeliković	755	4.3		824	4.6	
FDP	Bastian Roet	264	1.5	▼1.3	235	1.3	▼1.5
Volt	Felice Freifrau von Maltzahn	236	1.3		235	1.3	▼1.5
Tierschutzpartei					233	1.3	▼1.3
PARTEI					148	0.8	▼1.5
MERA25	Ceren Witkiewicz	94	0.5				
PdF					65	0.4	
DKP					36	0.2	▼0.1
ÖDP					23	0.1	Steady
du.					20	0.1	▼0.5
SGP					17	0.1	Steady
Informal votes		336			184		
Total valid votes		17,693			17,845		
Turnout		18,029	64.3	▲14.3			
Left gain from Greens	Majority	4,307	24.6				

=== 2023 repeat election ===
Changes denoted below for the 2023 election are compared to the 2016 election, as the 2021 election was declared invalid.

State election (2023): Mitte 6
Notes:	Blue background denotes the winner of the electorate vote. Pink background denotes a candidate elected from their party list. Yellow background denotes an electorate win by a list member, or other incumbent. A ✓ or ✗ denotes status of any incumbent, win or lose respectively.						
Party	Candidate	Votes	%	±%	Party votes	%	±%
Greens	Tuba Bozkurt	4,213	32.0	▲7.5	3,779	28.7	▲7.4
Left	Stefan Böhme	2,773	21.1	▲1.9	2,829	21.5	▲2.2
SPD	Melis Yeter	2,127	16.2	▼8.9	1,953	14.8	▼7.1
CDU	Cem Diyar Erkişi	1,978	15.0	▲4.6	1,940	14.7	▲4.5
AfD	Jacqueline Reimann-Wilhelm	752	5.7	▼4.5	706	5.4	▼4.4
Tierschutzpartei	Yvonne Zibulski	404	3.1		337	2.6	▲0.8
FDP	Laura Wamprecht	365	2.8	▼1.2	370	2.8	▼1.2
PARTEI	Andreas Zerlik	350	2.7		304	2.3	▼2.5
Volt					161	1.2	
Team Todenhöfer					148	1.1	
Klimaliste					90	0.7	
dieBasis	Karsten Heiko Wappler	103	0.8		81	0.6	
du.					80	0.6	
Pirates	Wieland Wilkniß	98	0.7	▼4.1	58	0.4	▼3.0
Mieterpartei					39	0.3	
DKP					38	0.3	▼0.1
Humanists					37	0.3	
The Grays					35	0.3	
Bergpartei, die ÜberPartei					34	0.3	
Gray Panthers					31	0.2	▼0.6
Verjüngungsforschung					24	0.2	▼0.2
Bildet Berlin!					17	0.1	
ÖDP					17	0.1	
FW					14	0.1	
SGP					12	0.1	▼0.4
NPD					11	0.1	▼0.2
The Pinks/Alliance 21					5	0.0	
BüSo					2	0.0	Steady
LKR					1	0.0	▼0.2
Informal votes		132			115		
Total valid votes		13,163			13,153		
Turnout		13,300	50.0	▼2.7			
Greens gain from SPD	Majority	1,440	10.9				

=== 2021 election (annulled) ===
The election in 2021 was annulled and rerun in 2023.

State election (2021): Mitte 6
Notes:	Blue background denotes the winner of the electorate vote. Pink background denotes a candidate elected from their party list. Yellow background denotes an electorate win by a list member, or other incumbent. A ✓ or ✗ denotes status of any incumbent, win or lose respectively.						
Party	Candidate	Votes	%	±%	Party votes	%	±%
Greens	Tuba Bozkurt	5,091	29.8	▲5.3	4,504	26.2	▲4.9
Left	Stefan Böhme	3,801	22.2	▲3.1	3,933	22.8	▲3.5
SPD	Melis Yeter	3,564	20.9	▼4.2	3,009	17.5	▼4.5
CDU	Cem Diyar Erkişi	1,468	8.6	▼1.8	1,407	8.2	▼2.1
AfD	Jacqueline Reimann-Wilhelm	862	5.0	▼5.2	818	4.8	▼5.0
FDP	Laura Wamprecht	811	4.7	▲0.8	746	4.3	▲0.3
Team Todenhöfer					607	3.5	
Tierschutzpartei	Yvonne Zibulski	537	3.1		346	2.0	▲0.3
PARTEI	Andreas Zerlik	491	2.9		465	2.7	▼2.1
Volt					237	1.4	
dieBasis	Karsten Heiko Wappler	299	1.8		213	1.2	
Klimaliste					187	1.1	
Pirates	Wieland Wilkniß	161	0.9	▼3.9	95	0.6	▼2.9
FW					87	0.5	
du.					82	0.5	
The Grays					76	0.4	
Gray Panthers					61	0.4	▼0.5
APT					57	0.3	
Humanists					54	0.3	
DKP					45	0.3	▼0.1
Bergpartei, die ÜberPartei					33	0.2	
Mieterpartei					33	0.2	
ÖDP					29	0.2	
Verjüngungsforschung					25	0.1	▼0.2
NPD					23	0.1	▼0.2
Bildet Berlin!					15	0.1	
SGP					12	0.1	▼0.4
The Pinks/Alliance 21					10	0.1	
LKR					8	0.0	▼0.2
BüSo					3	0.0	Steady
Informal votes		284			196		
Total valid votes		17,085			17,220		
Turnout		17,436	64.7	▲12.1			
Greens gain from SPD	Majority	1,290	7.6				

== See also ==
- Politics of Berlin
- House of Representatives of Berlin
