= Gewobag =

German property company

Gewobag Wohnungsbau-Aktiengesellschaft Berlin
- Company type: Aktiengesellschaft
- Industry: Real estate
- Founded: 14 May 1919; 106 years ago
- Headquarters: Berlin-Moabit, Germany
- Key people: Malte Bädelt (Executive Board); Markus Terboven (Executive Board); Wilfried Wendel (Chairman of the supervisory board)
- Revenue: ▲€654.9 million (2024)
- Total assets: ▲€6.25 billion (2024)
- Number of employees: ▲717 (2024)
- Website: gewobag.de

Gewobag is a German property company owned by the State of Berlin which plans to own 80,000 apartments by 2030 in order to improve housing affordability.

Gewobag's name comes from a shortening of its former legal name, German: Gemeinnützige Wohnungsbau-AG Groß Berlin, roughly "Public Housing Construction Corporation of Greater Berlin".

In September 2019 Gewobag bought 6000 apartments, mostly in Spandau and Reinickendorf. The purchase from ADO Properties cost 920 million euros and is considered the largest such purchase of apartments ever for Berlin.

In January 2020, the European Investment Bank provided Gewobag with a €240 million loan as part of a cooperation agreement to support the construction of 2,000 housing units by 2023. Additionally, in June 2021, the company issued a "Social Bond" worth €500 million on the capital market. In the 2024 financial year, the company completed approximately 1,000 apartments.

== See also ==
- Deutsche Wohnen
