= Nebenan =

Good Hood GmbH
- Industry: Social Media
- Founded: Germany 2015
- Founder: Christian Vollmann and Till Behnke, Matthes Scheinhardt, Ina Remmers, Michael Vollmann, and Sven Tantau
- Headquarters: Berlin, Germany
- Area served: Germany, Spain, France and Italy
- Key people: Till Behnke (CEO)
- Owner: Hubert Burda Media
- Number of employees: 150
- Website: nebenan.de

Nebenan (German for "next door") is a social media platform for interactions in a user's neighborhood area.

== History ==
It includes neighborhoods in a number of cities in Germany, Spain, France and Italy. The network is run by Good Hood GmbH and was created in 2015. Since 2020, Nebenan is owned and marketed by Hubert Burda Media.

== See also ==
- nextdoor, a similar service founded in 2008
- Streetlife, a similar service founded in UK
