= Water remunicipalisation =

Water remunicipalisation is a process in which the state of privatised water and sanitation management is changed into one that falls back under public control. In recent years water remunicipalisation has grown into a global trend and can be seen as a response to failing cases of privatisation.

Traditionally, many water services around the globe stem from private ventures. If the change of management from private to municipal control continues to be an ongoing trend, it could mean a complete redesign of the global water sector. Proponents of water remunicipalisation argue that the inefficiency of the private sector presents itself in its profit-oriented character, resulting in high prices and eventually inequal access to life essential utilities.
