= Vonovia =

German real estate company

Vonovia SE

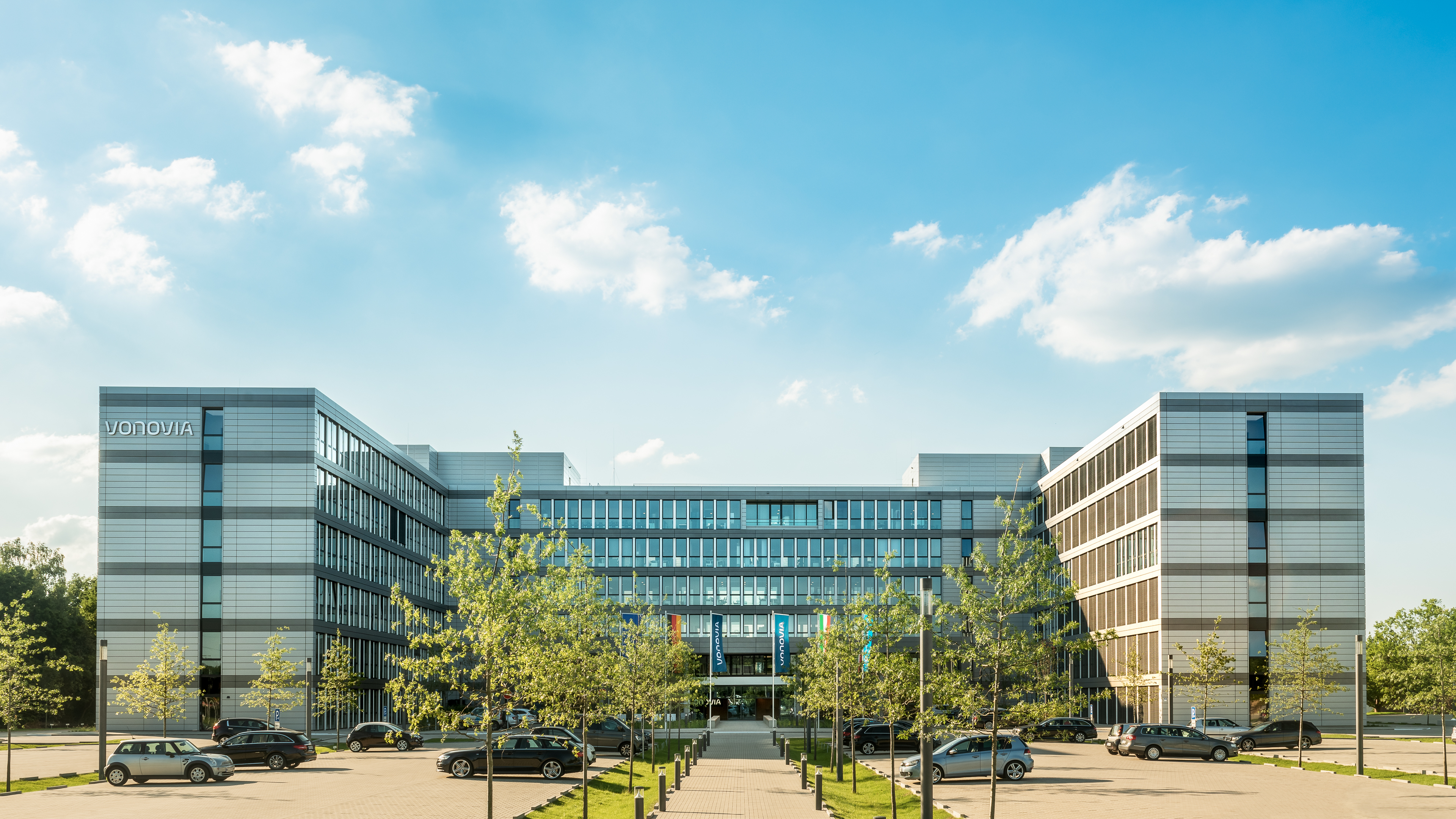
- Headquarters of Vonovia
- Formerly: Deutsche Annington
- Type: Public (Societas Europaea)
- Traded as: FWB: VNA; DAX Component
- ISIN: DE000A1ML7J1
- Industry: Real estate
- Predecessor: GAGFAH
- Founded: 2001; 25 years ago in Düsseldorf, Germany
- Headquarters: Bochum, Germany
- Areas served: Germany (88%); Sweden (8%); Austria (4%)
- Key people: Luka Mucic (Chief Executive Officer); Clara C. Streit (Chair of the Supervisory Board)
- Revenue: ▼€4,918.8 billion (2025)
- Net income: ▲ -€4,185.5 million (2025)
- Total assets: ▲€93,255.3 million (2025)
- Total equity: ▲€32,167.7 million (2025)
- Number of employees: ▲12,708 (2025)
- Subsidiaries: BUWOG; Hembla Group; Victoria Park
- Website: vonovia.de

Vonovia is a European multinational real estate company based in Bochum, North Rhine-Westphalia. Its history goes back to Deutsche Annington, which merged with GAGFAH and was subsequently renamed Vonovia. The company currently owns around 530,979 apartments in Germany, Sweden, and Austria, establishing it a significant market player in these countries. Vonovia is a member of the DAX 40 and STOXX Europe 600 blue-chip indexes.

By taking over competitors such as Viterra, Gagfah and most recently Deutsche Wohnen, Vonovia has become the market leader and the largest real estate company for private apartments in Germany.

== History ==
=== Early years ===
At the end of the 1990s, the German government decided to privatize homes for railway workers as part of the railway reform. The Japanese financial group Nomura Holdings and its subsidiary Deutsche Annington (named after Annington Homes from Great Britain) sought to acquire them. After years of negotiations, the company finally received a significant share in 2000. The company responded to criticism of the sale with extensive exclusive rights, such as a lifetime right of residence and a restriction on rent increases. Besides, tenants were allowed to purchase their property. In the following years, Deutsche Annington invested in further smaller stocks of railway workers' apartments, which had previously remained in the ownership of the federal government.

=== Acquisitions ===
Deutsche Annington took over several smaller holdings, for example, from Allianz and RWE. In 2003, the E.ON energy group also put its real estate business up for sale under the name Viterra. With the acquisition of over 150,000 apartments, Deutsche Annington became the market leader in Germany. It was the largest transaction of its kind in the country's history, which met with criticism from unions and tenant protection associations alike. In the course of this, Terra Firma Capital Partner's majority shareholding in Deutsche Annington was repeatedly brought up as a central theme.

Deutsche Annington achieved its returns with a combination of renting and selling apartments. It was instrumental in shaping the concept of socially responsible tenant privatization. In this way, the company wanted to raise funds to expand its portfolio to half a million and later even to one million apartments. In 2007, Deutsche Annington announced that it would again turn away from tenant privatization. From then on, the company concentrated on smaller acquisitions, such as the Sparkassen-Finanzgruppe's subsidiary Corpus.

=== Going public ===
In 2010, the profit of Deutsche Annington exceeded the 500 million euro mark for the first time. Nevertheless, the global economic and financial crisis made access to cheap debt capital more difficult. Refinancing became one of the main problems of the entire real estate industry. For this reason, an IPO was back on the agenda. To this end, the company hired Rolf Buch, a former member of the Bertelsmann executive board, as CEO. He emphasized above all the size of the company as a distinguishing feature. The rise in key interest rates dampened the interest of potential investors so that the IPO had to be postponed several times. In 2013, Deutsche Annington finally placed its shares on the Frankfurt Stock Exchange with a lower volume and a reduced issue price. Two years later, the company became the first representative of the real estate industry to be included in the DAX, the index of the largest listed stock corporations in Germany.

=== Vonovia origins ===
The media had already reported on Deutsche Annington's interest in GAGFAH in 2003. At the end of 2014, Deutsche Annington then officially offered to take over the competitor for around 3.9 billion euros to create a leading residential property group in Europe. Following the approval of the shareholders and the antitrust authorities, the transaction was completed ahead of schedule in March 2015. In 2015, the annual General Meeting voted to rename the company Vonovia to modernize its external image. The administrative and statutory headquarters were moved to the new offices in Bochum.

=== European expansion ===
In contrast, initially, Vonovia failed with its 2015 offer for Deutsche Wohnen but at least prevented Deutsche Wohnen's planned merger with LEG Immobilien. The company then turned to the neighboring states: A strategic partnership was agreed upon with the French housing company Société Nationale Immobilière (now CNC Habitat) in 2017. The acquisition of Conwert Immobilien and BUWOG made Vonovia the leading real estate group in Austria in 2018. In the same year, the company exceeded the threshold of 50% of the shares in the Swedish housing company Victoria Park, which has been 100% owned by Vonovia since 2019. Vonovia expanded its position thereby acquiring its Swedish rival Hembla. A renewed attempt at taking over Deutsche Wohnen in May 2021 was approved by the Federal Cartel Office but stalled when the 50% threshold was not met at first. Only the third offer from August 2021 resulted in more than 60% acceptances, thus successfully completing the takeover.

=== Strategic shift since 2022 ===
The end of the cheap-money era in 2022, combined with sharply rising construction costs and interest rates, significantly altered Vonovia's operating environment. In January 2023, the company suspended all new construction projects that had not yet started and abandoned a previous target of building 60,000 additional apartments. For the 2023 financial year, Vonovia reported a loss of €6.76 billion, its largest ever, after writing down its portfolio by €10.7 billion.

To reduce debt, Vonovia disposed of significant parts of its portfolio. In April 2023, Apollo Global Management acquired a minority stake in the Südewo portfolio of approximately 21,000 apartments in Baden-Württemberg for €1 billion. In 2024, Vonovia sold around 4,500 apartments in Berlin to two state-owned housing companies for €700 million.

In December 2024, Vonovia and Deutsche Wohnen signed a Domination domination and profit and loss transfer agreement. Following approval by both companies' extraordinary general meetings in January 2025, Deutsche Wohnen's management and profits became subject to direction by Vonovia. Outside shareholders of Deutsche Wohnen receive an annual guaranteed compensation of €1.22 per share or may exchange their shares at a ratio of 0.7947 Vonovia shares per Deutsche Wohnen share.

On 6 May 2025, the supervisory board appointed Luka Mucic as the new chief executive officer. Mucic, previously chief financial officer of Vodafone Group and earlier chief financial officer of SAP SE from 2014 to 2023, took office on 1 January 2026, succeeding Rolf Buch, who had led the company since 2013.

== Company ==
Vonovia is a European stock company (Societas Europaea, SE for short). Its shares are traded on the regulated market (Prime Standard) of the Frankfurt Stock Exchange. They are part of the DAX and listed in the STOXX Europe, MSCI Germany, and EPRA, for example. According to the Deutsche Börse definition, more than 80% are in free float. Vonovia's largest shareholders include the Norwegian central bank Norges Bank (14.0%), the American fund company BlackRock (8.0%) and the Dutch pension fund APG (3.7%). The majority of investors are pension funds, sovereign wealth funds, international asset managers, and other long-term investors. There are also individual shareholders.

The company's constitution follows the dual system of an executive board ("Vorstand") and a controlling body board ("Aufsichtsrat"). Currently, Vonovia is managed by Luka Mucic (CEO), former CFO of Vodafone and SAP, as well as Arnd Fittkau (CRO), Philip Grosse (CFO), Ruth Werhahn (CHRO) and Katja Wünschel (CDO). The supervisory board of Vonovia has ten members, led by Clara C. Streit, chair of the German Corporate Governance Commission and chair of the supervisory board of Deutsche Börse Group.

Within the Vonovia group, residential development and new construction are concentrated in BUWOG, acquired in 2018, which builds housing both for retention in Vonovia's own portfolio and for sale to investors or owner-occupiers. Property maintenance, repairs, and modernization are carried out by Vonovia Technischer Service, an in-house unit with around 4,000 employees at 47 locations, which the company describes as the largest skilled-trades business in Germany.

== Financial indicators ==
=== Key Figures ===
in millions of euros	2014	2015	2016	2017	2018	2019	2020	2021	2022	2023	2024	2025
Total Assets	5,309.9	11,735.3	32,552.1	37,516.3	49,387.6	56,497.7	62,417.4	106,320.3	101,389.6	91,995.9	90,236.3	93,255.3
Equity	2,670.1	7,164.3	13,888.4	16,691.2	19,664.1	21,069.7	24,831.8	36,545.1	34,438.8	29,944.6	28,126.9	32,167.7
Equity ratio	40.4%	38.3%	42.7%	44.5%	39.8%	37.3%	39.8%	34.4%	34.0%	32.5%	31.2%	34.5%
Rental income	789.3	1,414.6	1,538.1	1,667.9	1,894.2	2,074.9	2,285.9	2,571.9	3,168.1	3,292.0	3,323.5	3,417.2
Profit	500.3	838.4	1,083.7	1,271.8	1,534.4	1,579.6	1,822.4	2,269.3	2,763.1	2,583.8	2,625.1	2,800.8
Cash Flow	453.2	689.8	828.9	946.0	1,132.5	1,555.9	1,430.5	1,823.9	2,084.3	1,901.2	2,401.6	2,448.3
Net income for the period	409.7	994.7	2,512.9	2,566.9	2,402.8	1,294.3	3,340.0	2,440.5	−669.4	−6,756.2	−962.3	4,185.5

== Portfolio ==
According to the annual report 2025, Vonovia owned 530,979 residential units, 162,769 garages and parking spaces, as well as 8,524 commercial units. These extended to 608 domestic and foreign cities and municipalities. Based on a total fair market value of more than 80 billion euros, the vast majority of the portfolio was located in Germany (88%), with the remainder in Sweden (9%), and Austria (3%). Also, 76,255 apartments were managed by Vonovia on behalf of third parties.

== Controversy ==
As of 27 September 2021 Vonovia owns the majority of shares in German real estate company Deutsche Wohnen. Deutsche Wohnen announced a voluntary public takeover offer. The consolidation of Deutsche Wohnen and Vonovia would significantly increase its market share in states like Berlin. In a public referendum held one day earlier, the majority of Berliners decided in favour of nationalising the housing stocks of large residential property companies. Vonovia CEO Rolf Buch responded to the referendum outcome by saying "Expropriation won't solve the many challenges in Berlin's housing market. In view of such major challenges, Berlin cannot afford years of deadlock ". Vonovia and Deutsche Wohnen agreed to sell 14,000 apartments to the state of Berlin.

== Sustainability ==
Vonovia reports contributions to the UN SDG's like CO_{2} neutrality. Every year targets are formulated and the sustainability performance is reported on. This data is audited by the statutory auditor.

In September 2021, Vonovia announced plans for solar panels on 30,000 roofs by 2050. As of September 2021 only 1000 roofs are equipped with solar panels despite supporting the SDG climate goals confirm the UN COP21 Paris Agreement.
