= Education and Science Workers' Union (Germany) =

Trade union in Germany

GEW
- Gewerkschaft Erziehung und Wissenschaft
- Founded: 1948
- Headquarters: Frankfurt, Germany
- Location: Germany
- Members: 274,532 (2025)
- Key people: Maike Finnern, president
- Affiliations: DGB
- Website: www.gew.de

The Education and Science Workers’ Union (German: Gewerkschaft Erziehung und Wissenschaft, GEW) is a trade union in Germany. It has a membership of 280,343 and is one of eight industrial affiliates of the German Confederation of Trade Unions. Most members are teachers, but it also represents day care workers, social workers, private educators, researchers and professors.

GEW is founding member of the Berlin Energy Table which successfully pushed for a Referendum on the recommunalization of energy supply in Berlin in 2013.

== Trusts ==
=== Fair Childhood ===
A charitable trust founded by the trades union GEW with the mission to use education to fight child labour ("Bildung statt Kinderarbeit").

== Presidents ==
1947: Max Traeger
1952: Bernhard Plewe
1958: Max Traeger
1960: Heinrich Rodenstein
1968: Erich Frister
1981: Dieter Wunder
1997: Eva-Maria Stange
2005: Ulrich Thöne
2013: Marlis Tepe
2021: Maike Finnern
