= 2013 Berlin energy referendum =

- 3 November 2013
- Referendum on the remunicipalisation of Berlin's energy supply
- Outcome: Referendum failed because the required quorum of 25% approval of the total electorate was not achieved.

Results
Choice	Votes	%
Yes	599,588	83.20%
No	121,113	16.80%
Valid votes	720,701	99.81%
Invalid or blank votes	1,408	0.19%
Total votes	722,109	100.00%
Registered voters/turnout	2,483,756	29.07%

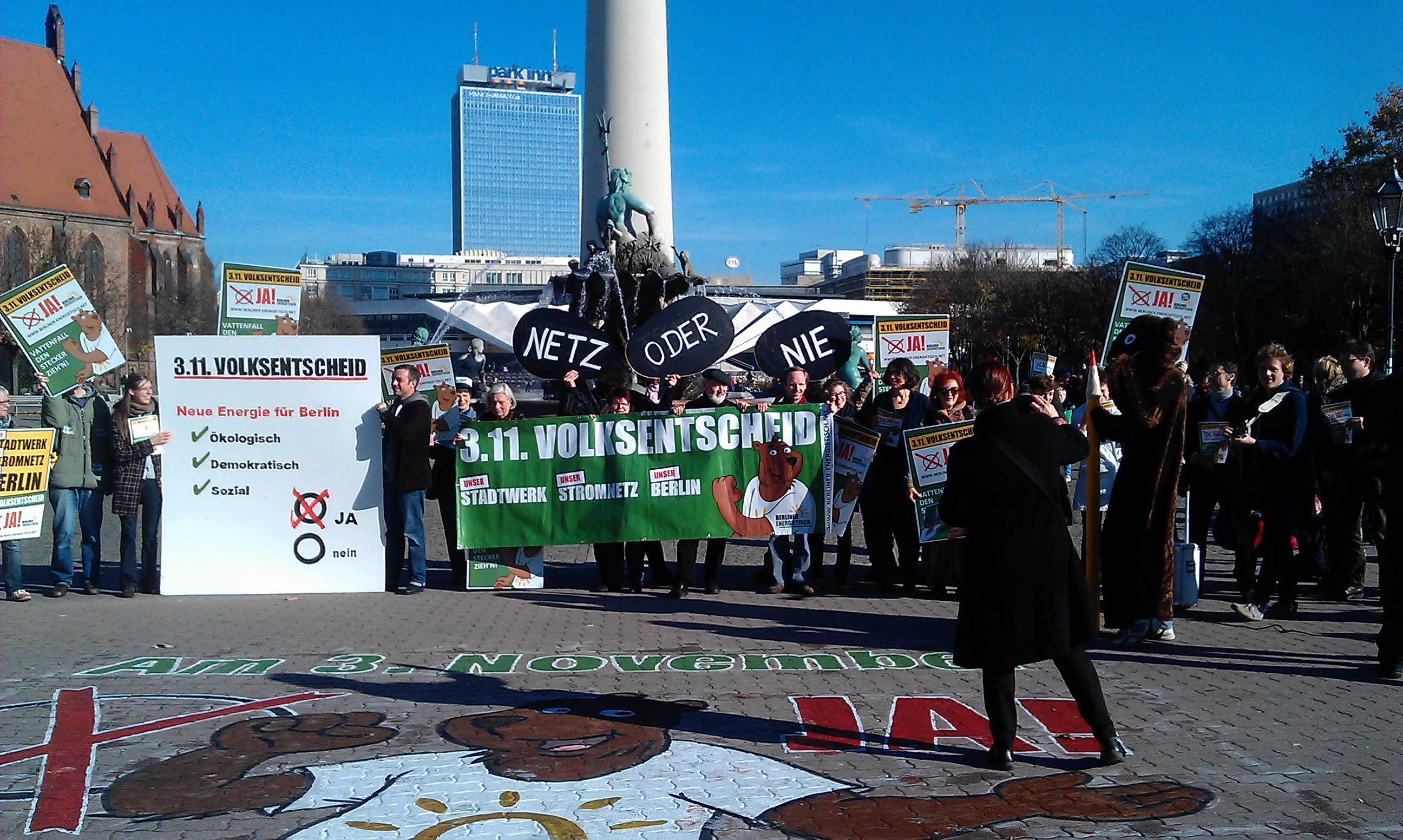
Final pre-referendum rally of Berlin Energy Table at Berlin's Neptunbrunnen

A referendum on the remunicipalization of the energy supply in Berlin was held on 3 November 2013. Prompted by the Neue Energie für Berlin (New Energy for Berlin) citizens' initiative in June 2013, it was approved by 83% of those who voted. However, the referendum failed due to insufficient voter turnout. 24.2% of Berlin voters voted in favor, but the quorum required 25% or more to do so.

== Draft legislation ==
The New Energy for Berlin draft law aimed for the remunicipalization of Berlin's energy supply that was privatized in 1997, when the city of Berlin sold its municipal infrastructure and services company Bewag to the Swedish power company Vattenfall. It also demanded economically democratic control of the supply and a fast transition to 100% renewable energy.

== Initiators ==
Logo of the Berlin Energy Table

The referendum on New Energy for Berlin was initiated by the Berlin Energy Table (German: Berliner Energietisch), a non-partisan alliance of about 55 organizations, initiatives, and individual activists aiming for the remunicipalization of the municipal energy supply. The alliance was founded in 2011 as an open platform for all those lobbying for a socially just, ecologically sustainable, and economically democratic energy, gas, and heating supply in Berlin.

Members of the alliance include the Berlin sections of attac, BUND, People's Solidarity, the Education and Science Workers' Union (GEW) as well as community organizations for affordable housing and the left-wing initiative FelS. While being non-partisan, the alliance is supported by the federal sections of major parties such as the SPD, Alliance '90/The Greens, and Die Linke.

== Course of events ==
Between 11 February and 10 June 2013, the initiators collected 227,748 valid signatures of Berlin citizens, around 50,000 more than necessary to qualify for a referendum (Volksbegehren).

== Results ==
Choice	Votes	%
For	599,588	83.20
Against	121,113	16.80
Invalid/blank votes	1,408	–
Total	722,109	100
Registered voters/turnout	2,483,756	29.07
Source: Berlin Returning Officer
