= Deutsche Wohnen =

Housing association in Germany

Deutsche Wohnen SE
- Company type: Societas Europaea
- Traded as: FWB: DWNI; MDAX component
- ISIN: DE000A0HN5C6
- Industry: Real estate
- Predecessor: Deutsche Bank AG properties
- Founded: 1998
- Headquarters: Berlin, Germany
- Key people: Lars Urbansky (CEO); Fabian Heß (Chairman of the Supervisory Board)
- Revenue: €1.334 billion (2025)
- Number of employees: 742 (31 Dec 2025)
- Website: Official website

Deutsche Wohnen SE is a German property company, and one of the 30 companies that compose the DAX index. Previously listed on the MDAX, it replaced Lufthansa on the DAX after Lufthansa was downgraded to the MDAX because of losses during the COVID-19 pandemic. Germany's largest real estate company for private apartments Vonovia took over Deutsche Wohnen, the second largest German company in 2021. Vonovia acquired additional shares and now holds 87.6 percent of Deutsche Wohnen. This created a European real estate giant with around 568,000 apartments.

== History ==
In July 2015, it was reported that Deutsche Wohnen had about EUR 600M available, and might be looking to acquire 8,000-9,000 apartments.

In September 2021, a public referendum named after the company took place, asking the residents of Berlin if large corporate landlords should have their residential apartments expropriated. Over 56% of voters agreed, and the decision has been put before the newly elected local government.

== See also ==
- Deutsche Wohnen & Co. enteignen
- Gewobag
