= Remunicipalization =

Remunicipalisation commonly refers to the return of previously privatised water supply and sanitation services to municipal authorities. It also encompasses regional or national initiatives.

== Overview ==
The concept is broadly used to cover:

- Changes from private to wholly public ownership of assets or companies.
- Changes from outsourcing (or contracting-out) of services to direct provision by a public authority.
- Replacement of concessions or lease contracts by public management.

Remunicipalisation happens at many levels:

- Municipal and community levels (such as in France or the US), including inter-municipal groups or associations.
- Regional levels (as in the Buenos Aires and Santa Fe provinces of Argentina).
- National levels (such as in Malaysia).

At least 234 cases of water remunicipalisation in 37 countries were recorded between 2000 and March 2015, including high profile cases in Europe, the Americas, Asia and Africa. By then, the total number of people served by remunicipalised water services had grown to exceed 100 million. Cases are more concentrated in high-income countries, where 183 remunicipalisations took place in the last 15 years, compared to 51 cases in middle- and low-income countries. Two countries, France with 94 cases and the US with 58 cases, account for the greatest majority of cases in high-income countries. Analysts also signal that the pace of remunicipalisation has doubled in the 2010-2015 period compared with the first decade of the millennium.

== Akteure ==
Very often, utility managers, bureaucrats and politicians are the ones to recognise problems with water privatisation. Labour involvement is critical for the success of remunicipalisation because frontline workers have important insights into operational challenges and opportunities. Civil society movements have proven key to promoting remunicipalisation as a policy option, as well framing it as an opportunity to build socially desirable and environmentally sustainable public water models to benefit present and future generations. Researchers have been playing a role in international exchange of expertise on how to achieve transparent, accountable and effective public water management following remunicipalisation.

== Reasons for remunicipalisation ==
Direct experience with common problems of private water management has persuaded many communities and policy makers that the public sector is better placed to provide quality services to citizens and promote the human right to water. These problems with water privatisation include:

- Poor performance of private companies (e.g. in Dar es Salaam, Accra, Maputo).
- Under-investment (e.g. Berlin, Buenos Aires).
- Disputes over operational costs and price increases (e.g. Almaty, Maputo, Indianapolis),
- Soaring water bills (e.g. Berlin, Kuala Lumpur).
- Difficulties in monitoring private operators (e.g. Atlanta).
- Lack of financial transparency (e.g. Grenoble, Paris, Berlin).
- Workforce cuts and poor service quality (e.g. Atlanta, Indianapolis).

At the global level, 92 of the 234 cases of remunicipalisation recorded followed contractual termination, while 69 cases were non-renewals of private contracts after expiry. In the great majority of cases private contracts proved to be unsustainable. Local governments, then, opted to remunicipalise even though they knew that they may have to pay compensation, because they evaluated that it would be less costly than continuing with privatisation in the long run.

David McDonald puts remunicipalisation debates in a historical perspective: “Most contemporary water services around the world started as private enterprises (as early as the mid-1800s), but as the inefficiency of private sector providers became increasingly evident, and as private companies denied water services to the poor (contributing to outbreaks of cholera and other illnesses), local governments began to municipalise these services for the first time.”

== Benefits ==
Financially, there have been direct savings from remunicipalisation for most of the municipalities – around €35 million in the first year in Paris, and about C$6 million in the first three years of remunicipalisation in Hamilton, Ontario – some of which was realised immediately when profit-taking fees for private management were removed. As a result, some new public operators significantly increased investments in the water systems, such as in Grenoble (France), Buenos Aires (Argentina) and Arenys de Munt (Spain). In turn, such longer term infrastructure development helps avoid future cost burdens associated with the types of health and environmental hazards experienced under privatisation, much of which was borne by the state in the past.

Further, the social benefits of water remunicipalisation have been visible in Arenys de Munt (Spain), where the local government and the new public operator restructured the tariff system to guarantee equitable access to water for low-income households. In Buenos Aires, Argentina, achieving universal access to water became a top priority for the new public operator AySA. The utility increased investment in infrastructure dramatically, and extended training programmes for employees who work with poor neighbourhood residents to expand services.

Remunicipalisation also allows strengthening accountability and transparency. In Paris and Grenoble (France), the new public water operators have introduced advanced forms of public participation. This allows civil society to partake in decisions on the management of this basic public service, and to make operations responsive to the interests of local communities.

With remunicipalisation, the perspective often changes from a narrow, profit-oriented one to broader social and political objectives. Many remunicipalised water entities have demonstrated their ability to think beyond their sector to be more holistic in their planning and action. Intergovernmental coordination is often essential on issues such as watershed management for example.

Research on Buenos Aires and Hamilton has shown that public water employees became more engaged in the planning and operation of water services than they were in the past and more committed to public water services beyond the narrow financial and technocratic concerns that dominate private water management.

== Risks ==
Successful remunicipalisation requires careful planning and assessment of external risks, even more so for countries of the South which are under the grips of multilateral agencies. Each privatisation experience leaves significant structural, financial and ideological legacies that shape the direction of remunicipalisation and often constrain the potential for public sector success.

Even where political will is strong and financial and technical capacity exists, reverting to public ownership and management is fraught with difficulties. There is institutional memory lost, degraded assets, communication and accounting systems that do not mesh with public sector systems, and so on. The deep asset deficit left by many private water companies means that municipalities are working with decrepit equipment and collapsing infrastructure that can be more expensive to repair than to replace and build anew. Private firms have also demonstrated that they can be politically difficult, sabotaging transition efforts to try and undermine the public provider. In many cases the private companies refuse to release critical operational information, attempt to take the municipalities to court for breach of contract, or initiate PR campaigns in an effort to undercut the credibility of the remunicipalisation initiatives.

When a private contract is terminated before its expiry date, private companies can sue local governments to receive compensation for the full profits granted under the contract. A private concessionaire in Arenys de Munt, Spain obstructed fiercely the remunicipalisation process by filing complaints against the city council. The city of Indianapolis, US was forced to pay a $29-million fee to French multinational Veolia to terminate the 20-year contract over a decade early. Berlin residents have had to accept very high costs to buy back the shares held by two private operators. Private concessionaires sued Tucuman and Buenos Aires, Argentina before an international arbitration tribunal to obtain compensation. The risk of having to pay hefty compensation can distort the decision-making process of local governments who are considering termination and remunicipalisation (e.g. Jakarta, Indonesia; Szeged, Hungary; Arezzo, Italy). But in other cases the potential benefits are so clear that local authorities are ready to face such risks.

Finally, donor funding cannot be relied on for remunicipalisation efforts. After decades of generous (and ongoing) political and financial support for privatisation from international financial institutions and bilateral donors, these development organisations have effectively ignored the remunicipalisation trend. Support for the implementation of remunicipalisation is practically non-existent (with the exception of limited funding for public-public partnerships from UN-Habitat ). In some cases international donors even have attempted to undermine remunicipalisation efforts, making the transition to public services an even more difficult one (such as the World Bank’s attempts to block remunicipalisation in Dar es Salaam and Lagos).

== Innovative public models ==
Experiments with public participation in water services planning, worker cooperatives, community water systems and other innovative models of service delivery are challenging older models of public water delivery. Proponents argue that remunicipalisation cannot be an unquestioned return to what was offered before privatisation; it must be an improvement on what is meant by public and an expansion of the democratic terms of engagement. Nonetheless, entrenched neoliberal beliefs in market-based incentives, ring-fenced accounting, cost-reflexive pricing, and competition within and between government departments (commonly defined as corporatization) has transformed the ways in which people think about and manage public services, raising questions about the potential for deep reform in the public sector.

Public-public partnerships

Public water operators and national or regional associations are increasingly helping each other through the remunicipalisation process. In Spain, the regional public company Aguas del Huesna (Andalusia) facilitated remunicipalisation for 22 municipalities. The remunicipalised water operators from Paris and Grenoble played a key role in helping other local authorities in France and elsewhere to remunicipalise and improve their water services. French local authorities and public water operators have benefited from the exchange of experience and knowledge on remunicipalisation that has been facilitated by associations of local governments and public enterprises. The regional institution CONGIAC in Catalonia also played a key role in Arenys de Munt’s remunicipalisation process from decision making to implementation. There are other such examples across boundaries. After failed public-private partnerships (PPPs), the Mozambican government entered into a not-for-profit partnership with a Dutch public water company focusing on local capacity building. Cooperation between public water companies as part of public-public partnerships is a viable alternative to costly PPPs and the most effective way to assist public water authorities in improving services.

Other sectors

Hospitals and electricity services have also been taken back into public hands, at all levels of government, and there are vibrant debates around the world about how various services can be returned to public ownership and control. Each service sector offers its own managerial, technical, geographic and political challenges, but there is much to be learned from inter-sectoral debate and dialogue.

== Remunicipalisation Tracker ==
Corporate Europe Observatory and the Transnational Institute have jointly developed a tracker to showcase cities, regions and countries that have rolled back privatisation and embarked on securing public water for all. This initiative mirrors the private water industry practice of listing upcoming privatisations and public-private partnerships as opportunities for commercial expansion. Cases focus on understanding why and how the remunicipalisation process took place as well as the obstacles encountered and the results achieved. In many cases, more detailed information is available through links. To provide a more realistic overview of the trend, the tracker also includes ongoing campaigns advocating for the remunicipalisation of water services.

== See also ==
- Nationalization
