= Water tariff =

Price assigned to water from public utilities

A water tariff (often called water rate in the United States and Canada) is a price assigned to water supplied by a public utility through a piped network to its customers. The term is also often applied to wastewater tariffs. Water and wastewater tariffs are not charged for water itself, but to recover the costs of water treatment, water storage, transporting it to customers, collecting and treating wastewater, as well as billing and collection. Prices paid for water itself are different from water tariffs. They exist in a few countries and are called water abstraction charges or fees. Abstraction charges are not covered in this article, but in the article on water pricing). Water tariffs vary widely in their structure and level between countries, cities and sometimes between user categories (residential, commercial, industrial or public buildings). The mechanisms to adjust tariffs also vary widely.

Most water utilities in the world are publicly owned, but some are privately owned or managed (see water privatization). Utilities are network industries and natural monopolies. Economic theory predicts that unregulated private utilities set the price of their product at a level that allows to extract a monopoly profit. However, in reality tariffs charged by utilities are regulated. They can be set below costs, at the level of cost recovery without a return on capital, or at the level of cost recovery including a predetermined rate of return on capital. In many developing countries tariffs are set below the level of cost recovery, even without considering a rate of return on capital [ref]. This often leads to a lack of maintenance and requires significant subsidies for both investment and operation. In developed countries water and, to a lesser degree, wastewater tariffs, are typically set close to or at the level of cost recovery, sometimes including an allowance for profit[ref].

Criteria for tariff setting

Water tariffs are set based on a number of formal criteria defined by law, as well as informal criteria. Formal criteria typically include:

- financial criteria (cost recovery),
- economic criteria (efficiency pricing based on marginal cost) and sometimes
- environmental criteria (incentives for water conservation).

Social and political considerations often are also important in setting tariffs. Tariff structure and levels are influenced in some cases by the desire to avoid an overly high burden for poor users. Political considerations in water pricing often lead to a delay in the approval of tariff increases in the run-up to elections. Another criterion for tariff setting is that water tariffs should be easy to understand for consumers. This is not always the case for the more complex types of tariffs, such as increasing-block tariffs and tariffs that differentiate between different categories of users.

== Tariff structures ==
There are numerous different tariff structures. Their prevalence differs between countries, as shown by international tariff surveys.

=== Types of tariff structures ===
Water and wastewater tariffs include at least one of the following components:

- a volumetric tariff, where water metering is applied, and
- a flat rate, where no water metering is applied.

Many utilities apply two-part tariffs where a volumetric tariff is combined with a fixed charge. The latter may include a minimum consumption or not. The level of the fixed charge often depends on the diameter of the connection.

Volumetric tariffs can

- be proportional to consumption (linear tariffs),
- increase with consumption (increasing-block tariffs, IBT), or
- decrease with consumption (decreasing-block tariffs, DBT).

The tariff for a first block on an IBT is usually set at a very low tariff with the objective to protect poor households that are assumed to consume less water than non-poor households. The size of the first block can vary from 5 cubic meters to 50 cubic meters per household and month. In South Africa, the first block of consumption of 6 cubic meters per household and month is even provided for free (free basic water). Average monthly water consumption varies depending on household size and consumption habits between about 4 cubic meters for a single-person household in temperate climate (e.g. in Germany) with no outdoor water use and about 50 cubic meters for a four-person household in warm climate (e.g. in the Southern United States) including outdoor water use.

However, there is not always a positive correlation between the level of household income and water consumption.

Wastewater tariffs typically follow the same structure as water tariffs. They are typically measured based on the volume of water supplied, sometimes after subtracting an allowance made for estimated or actual outdoor use. In the case of industries, wastewater tariffs are sometimes differentiated based on the pollutant load of the wastewater. In some cases wastewater tariffs are a fixed percentage of water tariffs, but usually they are set separately. In addition to regular bills, many utilities levy a one-time connection fee both for water and for sewer connections.

=== International tariff surveys ===
The OECD conducted two surveys of residential water tariffs in 1999 and in 2007-08, using a reference consumption of 15 cubic meters per household and month. The 2007-08 survey covered more than 150 cities in all 30 OECD member countries. The survey does not claim to be representative. The OECD survey was complemented by a survey of the industry information service Global Water Intelligence (GWI) conducted in 2007-2008 in parallel with the second OECD survey. The 2008 GWI survey covered 184 utilities in OECD countries and 94 utilities in non-OECD countries. GWI has repeated its survey every year from 2009 to 2012, increasing the number of utilities surveyed to 310 in 2012. The data from the OECD/GWI surveys are widely quoted and, unlike the results of other global tariff surveys, have been indirectly made available to the public.

The database of the International Benchmarking Network (IB-Net) for Water and Sanitation Utilities includes tariff data from more than 190 countries and territories tariffs.ib-net.org. Another tariff survey has been conducted by the International Water Association. In addition, surveys of tariffs for commercial and industrial customers in selected OECD countries have also regularly been conducted by the consulting firm NUS.

=== Prevalence of tariff structure types ===
Linear volumetric tariffs are the most common form of water tariffs in OECD countries, being used by 90 out of 184 utilities surveyed by Global Water Intelligence in 2007 and 2008, either with or without a fixed charge element. Some eastern European countries (Hungary, Poland and the Czech Republic) use pricing systems based solely on volumetric pricing, with no fixed charge element at all. Increasing-block tariff systems are used by 87 of the 184 utilities in OECD countries surveyed, such as e.g. in Spain. Since the late 1980s there has been a trend in OECD countries away from decreasing-block tariffs, which are apparently only still found in some cities of the United States. Where fixed charges exist as part of two-part tariffs, there is a shift toward the reduction or even abolition of large minimum free allowances in OECD countries. For example, Australia and South Korea have both moved in this direction during the 1990s. Flat rates are still reported in Canada, Mexico, New Zealand, Norway and the United Kingdom.

Concerning developing countries and transition economies, in the non-representative GWI sample of 94 utilities in 54 countries, 59 used linear volumetric tariffs and 31 used increasing-block tariffs. However, utilities from Sub-Saharan Africa where increasing-block tariffs are very common are under-represented in the GWI sample with only 6 utilities. On the other hand, utilities from transition economies where linear volumetric tariffs are common are over-represented with 28 utilities. The survey thus probably underestimates the prevalence of increasing-block tariffs in non-OECD countries.

== Tariff levels ==
There are different valid methods to compare water tariff levels. According to one method, the highest water and wastewater tariff in the world is found in Bermudas, equivalent to US$7.45 per m3 in 2017 (consumption of 15 m3 per month). The lowest water tariffs in the world are found in Turkmenistan and Cook Islands, where residential water is provided for free, followed by Uzbekistan with a water tariff equivalent to US$0.01 per m3 and no wastewater tariff

=== Difficulties related to tariff comparisons ===
There are two basic ways to calculate water and wastewater tariff levels for the purpose of comparing tariff levels between cities: One way is to calculate an average tariff for the utility. This is done by dividing total tariff revenues by the total consumption billed across all usage categories and all levels of consumption. Another way is to determine a typical level of consumption and calculate the residential tariff that corresponds to this consumption. Depending on which of these two methods is used the resulting tariff can vary significantly for the same utility.

The comparison of water and wastewater tariffs across countries is further complicated by the choice of the appropriate exchange rate (nominal exchange rates for a given year or over the average of several years, or purchasing power parity exchange rates).

Furthermore, providing a global overview of water tariff levels is complicated by the large number of service providers (utilities). In urban areas in the United States alone, there are more than 4,000 water utilities. In Germany there are more than 1,200 utilities. Few countries in the world maintain national databases of water and wastewater tariffs charged by utilities. There are few countries that maintain national tariff databases, usually those with a specialized regulatory agency for the water sector such as England (OFWAT), Chile (SISS), Colombia (CRA) or Peru (SUNASS).

=== Tariff levels ===
Among the 310 cities in the GWI 2012 tariff survey the average combined water and wastewater tariff was US$1.98/m3 for the 15 m3/month "benchmark" customer used by the survey. Utilities in four of the surveyed cities provide residential water and wastewater services for free: Dublin and Cork (see Ireland), as well as Belfast and Ashgabat in Turkmenistan. The lowest residential water and wastewater tariffs were found in Saudi Arabia (equivalent to US$0.03/m3) and in Havana, Cuba as well as Damascus, Syria (equivalent to US$0.04/m3). Rates in the United States in Clovis, CA are $0.42/m3. and $1.60/m3 in Seattle The highest water and wastewater tariffs were found in Aarhus, Denmark (US$9.21/m3), Essen, Germany (US$7.35/m3; not included in the OECD survey) Copenhagen, Denmark (US$7.09), and four Australian cities (Perth, Brisbane, Adelaide and Sydney) where the tariff for the benchmark user ranged from US$6.38/m3 - US$6.47/m3.

Concerning wastewater tariffs, in some countries such as [Nigeria] there is no wastewater tariff at all. In other countries - such as Mexico, Turkey, Belgium, Portugal and Korea - wastewater tariffs are low relative to water tariffs. Finally, in many OECD countries - such as in Australia, Germany, Italy, the UK and the US - wastewater tariffs are now higher than water tariffs, reflecting increasing cost recovery rates and an increase in the prevalence of wastewater treatment.

Wastewater tariffs from 126 countries and territories can be found here https://tariffs.ib-net.org/sites/IBNET/VisualSearch/IndexCurrentUSD?Weight=0&ServiceId=3&Yearid=0

Many utilities charge higher tariffs for commercial and industrial customers than for residential users, in an effort to cross-subsidy residential customers.

== Tariff adjustment processes ==
The process of adjusting water tariffs differs greatly from one location to another. In many large countries (China, France, Germany, India, Mexico, South Africa and the United States) the process of price adjustment takes place at the municipal level. Rules for price adjustments vary greatly. In the case of public service provision, tariffs are typically adjusted through a decision by the municipal council after a request by the municipal utility. Some countries, such as Germany, stipulate by law that all the financial costs of service provision must be recovered through tariff revenues. Other countries define cost recovery as a long-term objective, such as in Mexico. In the case of private service providers tariff adjustment rules are often laid out in concession or lease contracts, often providing for indexation to inflation.

In some developing countries, water tariffs are set at the national level. Tariff increases are often considered a politically sensitive issue and have to be decided by the Cabinet of Ministers or a National Pricing Commission. This is the case in many countries of the Middle East and North Africa (Egypt, Jordan, Lebanon, Morocco, Syria, Tunisia), as well as in many countries in Sub-Saharan Africa. In many countries, there are no objective criteria for tariff adjustments. Adjustments tend to be infrequent and often lag behind inflation so that cost recovery remains elusive.

Some countries have created regulatory agencies at the national level that review requests for tariff adjustments submitted by service providers. The earliest and best-known example is the regulatory agency OFWAT, which was established for England and Wales in 1989. Some developing countries followed suit. They include Chile (1990), Colombia (1994), Honduras (2004), Kenya, Mozambique (1998), Peru (1994), Portugal (1997), and Zambia (2000). The review process is typically based on transparent and objective criteria set by law, in an attempt to move decision-making at least partly out of the realm of politics. The track record of these agencies has been diverse, usually mirroring the political and administrative traditions of each country.

== Changes in water use in response to tariff increases ==
The responsiveness of demand to a change in price is measured by the price elasticity of demand, which is defined as the percentage change in demand divided by the percentage change in price. The price elasticity of drinking water demand by urban households is typically low. In European countries it ranges between -0.1 and -0.25, i.e. the demand for water decreases by 0.1% to 0.25% for every 1% increase in tariffs. In Australia and the United States price elasticity is somewhat higher in the range of -0.1 and -0.4.

== Affordability and social protection measures ==
In about half the OECD member countries, affordability of water charges for low-income households is or could become a significant issue, according to the OECD. In developing countries, the poor are often not connected to the network and often pay a higher share of their meager incomes for lower quantities of water supplied by water vendors through trucks. On the other hand, utility bills paid by those fortunate enough to be connected to the network are very low in some developing countries. Different countries have introduced a variety of approaches to protect the poor from high water tariffs.

=== Affordability ===
The affordability of water charges can be measured by macro- and micro-affordability. Macro-affordability" indicators relate national average household water and wastewater bills to average net disposable household income. In OECD countries it varies from 0.2% (Italy and Mexico) to 1.4% (Slovak Republic, Poland and Hungary). In the largest OECD countries the share is 0.3% in the United States and Japan, 0.7% in France and 0.9% in Germany. However, micro-affordability is quite different. It measures the share of bills in the income of the poor, defined in an OECD affordability study as the lowest decile of the population. This share varies between 1.1% (Sweden, Netherlands, Italy) and 5.3% in the Slovak Republic, 9.0% in Poland and 10.3% in Turkey. The OECD concludes that in half its member countries (15 out of 30), affordability of water charges for low-income households "is either a significant issue now or might become one in the future, if appropriate policy measures are not put in place." In developing countries the situation is more serious, not only because of lower incomes, but also because the poor are often not connected to the network. They usually pay a higher share of their meager incomes for lower quantities of water at often lower quality supplied by water vendors through trucks. On the other hand, utility bills paid by those fortunate enough to be connected to the network are often relatively low, especially in South Asia. Because of this situation the OECD does not recommend to use uniform "thresholds" for the affordability of water and wastewater bills. These "thresholds" are often quoted in the range of 3-5% of household income.

=== Social protection measures ===
Social protection measures to ensure that piped water remains affordable can be broadly classified into income support measures and tariff-related measures. Income support measures address the individual customer’s ability to pay from the income side (through income assistance, water services vouchers, tariff rebates and discounts, bill re-phasing and easier payment plans, arrears forgiveness). An example of income assistance to poor users is the subsidy system applied in Chile. Tariff-related measures keep the size of water bills low for certain groups (e.g. refinement of increasing-block tariffs, tariff choice, tariff capping). Examples of increasing block tariffs with a price of zero in the first block are found in Flanders and South Africa. Another measure is the cross-subsidization using different tariffs for different neighborhoods, as practiced in Colombia. A similar approach has been used at the national level in Portugal. The Portuguese economic water regulator carried out an affordability study that found out that 10.5% of the population paid more than 3% of their income for water and wastewater services. As a result, the regulator showed flexibility concerning tariff increases and tariff solutions in municipalities where affordability was a particular issue.

== See also ==
- Water industry
- Water metering
- Water pricing
