= Dune water =

Drinking water pumped from dunes

Dune water is drinking water which has been pumped up from dunes. Fresh rainwater filters through the sandy dunes and floats on top of the saltwater, from which it can be pumped and purified to become drinking water.

== Netherlands ==
Dune water is used as drinking water in most of the coastal areas in the Netherlands.

In 1851 a dune water company, Amsterdamsche Duinwater-Maatschappij, was founded in Amsterdam. This was the very first tap water company in the Netherlands. Since 1953 water was pumped from the dunes and transported to Amsterdam through a pipeline. Pumping up the fresh water from the dunes caused the ground water level to drop so in 1957 it was decided that river water had to infiltrated to replenish the supply. After the sand filtered the river water, it was pumped up and purified for human consumption. This Dutch process is unique in the world. Since 1975 the water is purified before infiltration. By using ozonisation and charcoal the Dutch purify their water without using chlorine. Tap water in the Netherlands is considered to be amongst the highest quality municipal waters in the world.

== See also ==
- EU water policy

== External sources ==
- The dune water machine
