= Water supply and sanitation in France =

Data
- Water coverage (broad definition): 99.5% (2003)
- Access to at least basic sanitation: 82% (2004)
- Continuity of supply: 100%
- Average urban water use (L/person/day): 165 (2004) or 262 (2003)
- Average urban water and sanitation tariff (US$/m^{3}): Euro 31/month
- Share of household metering: High
- Share of self-financing by utilities: Close to 100%
- Financing: 86 Euro/capita
- Share of tax-financing: Low, in rural areas
- Share of external financing: 0%
- Non-revenue water: 19%

Institutions
- Decentralization to municipalities: Yes
- National water and sanitation company: None
- Water and sanitation regulator: None
- Sector law: None
- Service providers: About 13,500 (water) and about 15,000 (sanitation)

Water supply and sanitation in France is universal and of good quality. Salient features of the sector compared to other developed countries are the high degree of private sector participation using concession and lease contracts (gestion déléguée) and the existence of basin agencies that levy fees on utilities in order to finance environmental investments. Water losses in France (26%) are high compared to England (19%) and Germany (7%).

== Access ==
Access to improved water supply and to adequate sanitation in France is universal. However, not every household has access to water from the network or disposes its wastewater through sewers.

Concerning water supply, according to a survey undertaken by the Ministry of Agriculture in 1995, 370,000 permanent inhabitants in rural areas (0.5% of the total population) did not have access to piped water supply. They are supplied by 30,000 water points, most of them wells. The government plans to increase the access rate to 100%, improve water quality by establishing protection areas around wells and springs, and to increase the reliability of water supply by increasing production, storage and interconnection of existing networks.

Concerning sanitation, while most of the population is served by sewers, according to one source about 18.3 million people (18%) out of 65 are served by on-site sanitation systems such as septic tanks. The above-mentioned inventory by the Ministry of Agriculture notes that out of 40m inhabitants of rural areas – 25m permanent and 15m seasonal inhabitants – 21m are connected to a sewer system, 10.6m should be connected and 9.6m cannot be connected. The total of those not connected to sewers (20.2 million) is higher because it includes seasonal inhabitants. The government intends to increase the coverage to the sewer networks in rural areas, in particular in ecologically vulnerable zones.

== Water use ==
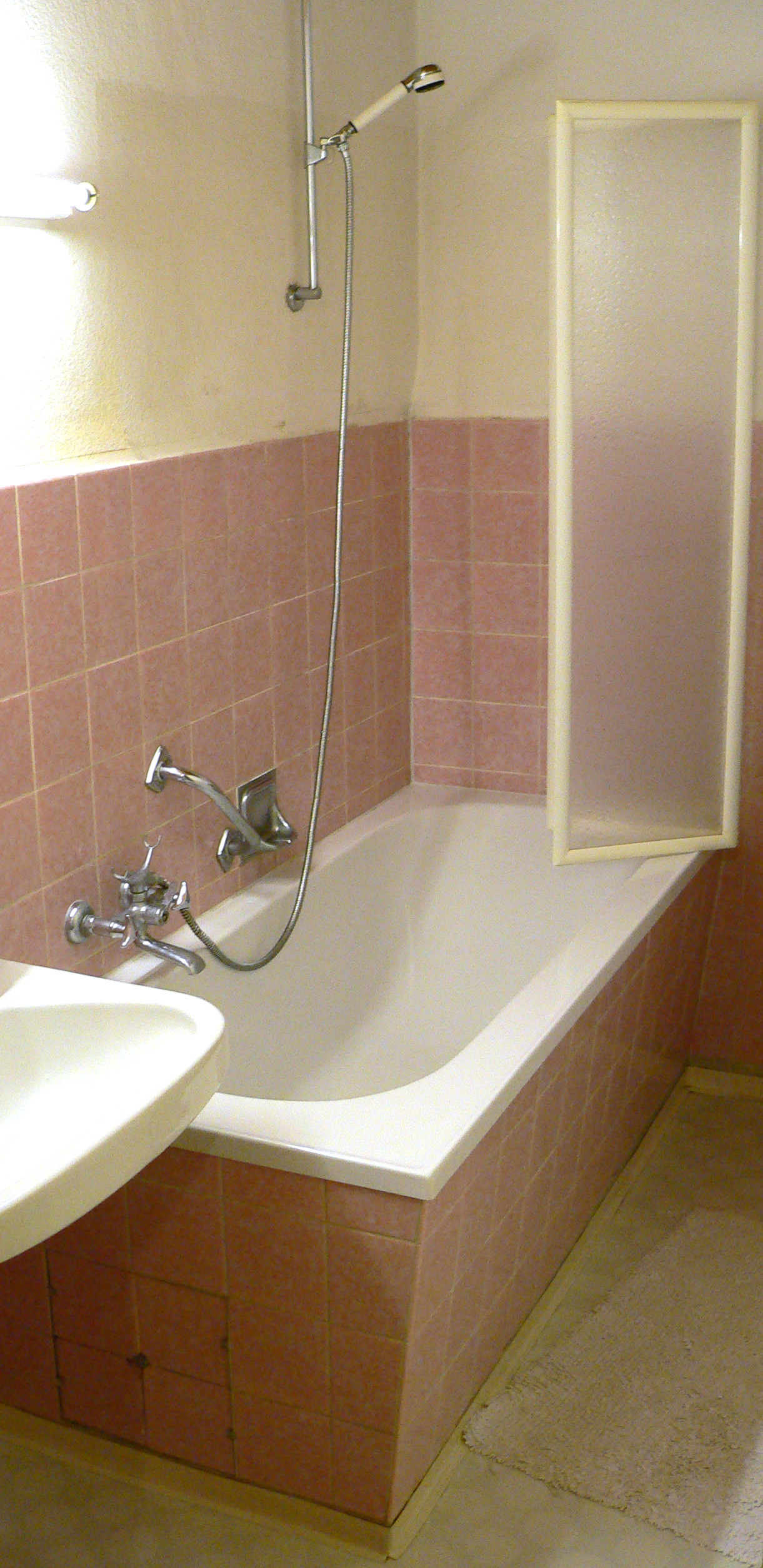
Baths and showers account for 39% of residential water use in France

According to the Centre d'Information sur l'Eau (CIEAU) residential water use in France is for the following uses:

- 39% for baths and showers
- 20% for toilets
- 12% for washing clothes
- 10% for washing dishes
- 6% for food preparation
- 6% for other residential uses
- 6% for outdoor uses (lawn watering and washing cars)
- 1% for drinking

== Water sources ==
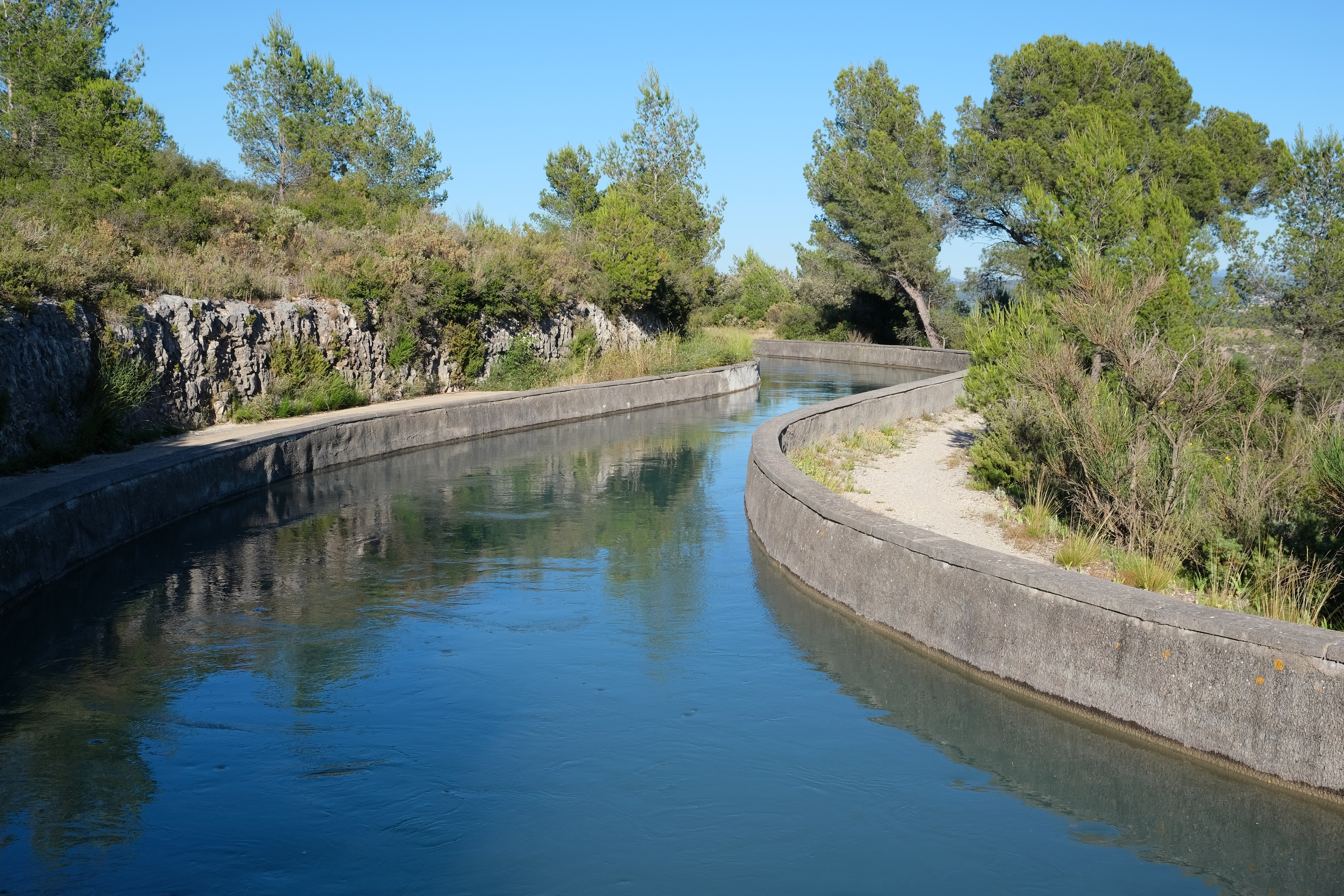
The Canal de Marseille, shown here entering a tunnel near Roquefavour Aqueduct, supplies two-thirds of the drinking water of Marseille from the Durance River

Total domestic water use in France is about 6 billion cubic metres or only about 3 percent of total runoff (191 billion cubic metres). 62 percent of drinking water supply is from groundwater and 28 percent from surface water.

== Service quality ==
Service quality is generally good with continuous water supply. In early 2008 private operators published for the first time consolidated performance indicators on service quality. It showed that 99.7% of samples complied with bacteriological standards for drinking water quality, but only 82.3% of samples complied with standards for the discharge of treated wastewater. The share of unplanned water service interruptions was less than 3%. The indicators do not include statistics on sewer overflows. A decree of May 2007 requires public service providers to provide the same information on service quality to the public that has been provided by private service providers, beginning in 2008.

According to a 2008 survey by the water information centre C.I.Eau 81% of respondents think that tap water is safe to drink. As in other EU countries, water quality monitoring is carried out at two levels, first by the service provider on a permanent basis, and second by the authorities on a sample basis.

The lack of wastewater treatment in some cities and towns discharging wastewater into sensitive areas is another matter of concern. In January 2008 the European Commission sent France a final warning alerting it that it will be taken to the European Court of Justice (ECJ) for the second time and possibly face fines unless it quickly brings its waste water treatment up to EU standards. France is not complying with the 1991 EU directive on urban waste water treatment. The deadline for treating all wastewater covered by the directive was 31 December 2000. In 2004 the European Court of Justice (ECJ) condemned France for failing to designate eleven areas as sensitive and for inadequate treatment facilities in a number of settlements which discharge their waste waters into these areas. The ECJ also found that 121 settlements breached the directive by discharging their waste waters into previously designated sensitive areas. In 2006 France designated the eleven areas as sensitive. However, 140 settlements – including the city of Paris – continue to discharge into these sensitive areas. With regard to the 121 settlements discharging into the previously designated sensitive areas France proceeded to rearrange them into 164 settlements, resulting in some settlements no longer meeting the threshold level of 10,000 residents at which the directive applies. The Commission considers such rearranging of settlements to avoid compliance with the directive unacceptable. In November 2009 it referred the matter to the ECJ.

== Consumer perceptions ==
A 2001 report to the French Parliament by one of its members, Yves Tavernier from the Socialist Party, concluded the following:

"The French feel that the rapid and poorly distributed increase in the price of water leads to new social inequities. They find it hard to accept that the water tariff weighs essentially on urban users and that, in apartment buildings, it is included in the rent. They do not understand that agricultural production is exempt from the Polluter-pays principle and that it continues to deteriorate the quality of groundwater with impunity. They wonder about the lack of transparency that prevails in the provision of public water supply. Finally, they find it very hard to understand their water bills."

A representative survey of consumers carried out in December 2007 showed that most consumers believe prices are too high. However, it also showed that they overestimate the price of water (Euro 4.80/m3 instead of the actual average price of Euro 3.02/m3). About 55% of the French population believe that treated wastewater is directly being reused as drinking water, which is not the case. The survey also shows that 84% of French consumers trust that the quality of their tap water is good. 67% declare that they drink water from the tap at least once a week. Those who are dissatisfied about tap water quality complain mainly about high levels of chlorine and calcium carbonate.

== Infrastructure ==
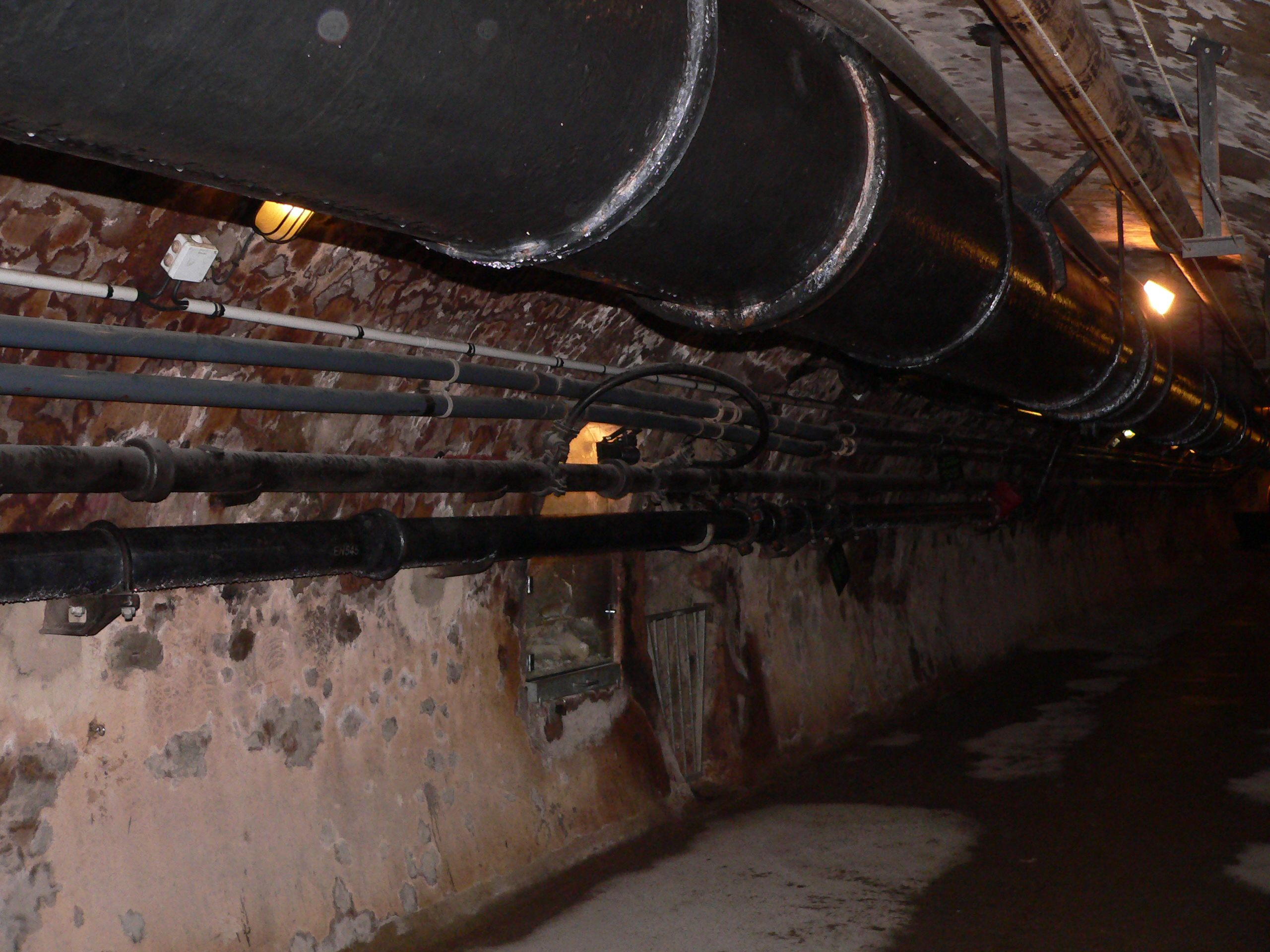
Sewers in Paris

In 2008 there were 15,250 water treatment plants and 17,300 wastewater treatment plants in France. The wastewater treatment plants produced about one million tons of sludge, half of which is being used in agriculture. The water and sewer network is about 800,000 km long.

== Responsibility for water supply and sanitation ==
Water supply, sewerage and wastewater treatment is a municipal responsibility in France. Many municipalities, in particular the smaller ones, have created municipal associations in order to benefit from economies of scale. Municipalities and municipal associations often contract out water supply and/or sanitation services to the private sector through long-term lease contracts (affermage).

Six water agencies plan the management of water resources, collect fees for the abstraction of water from rivers and aquifers as well as for the discharge of wastewater to the environment, and use the proceeds to subsidize investments in water supply and sanitation.

At the national level, no single Ministry is in charge of the sector and a variety of Ministries and other entities have attributions concerning specific aspects of the sector.

=== Policy and regulation ===
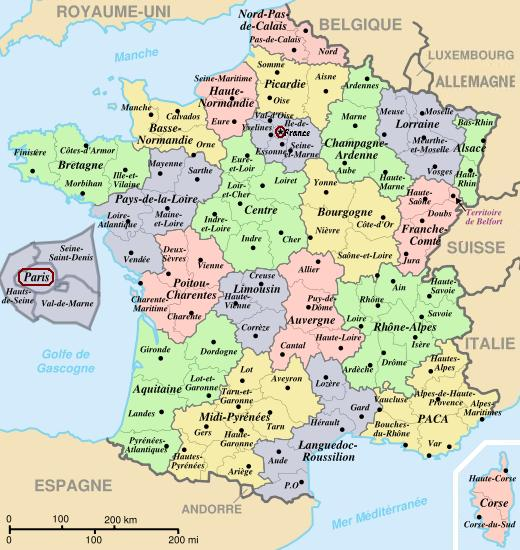

==== National level ====
The legal framework for water resources management, water supply and sanitation consists of three main laws: The Loi sur l'eau (Water Law) of 3 January 1992, the Loi n°95-101 relative au renforcement de la protection de l'environnement (Strengthening of Environmental Protection Law) of 2 February 1995 (« Loi Barnier »), and the Loi sur l’eau et les milieux aquatiques (Water and Aquatic Environment Law) of 30 December 2006. The latter transposes the EU Water Framework Directive into French law.

At the level of the national government, several Ministries have a role in determining policies for water supply and sanitation: The Ministry of Ecology, Energy, Sustainable Development and Territorial Planning (Meeddat), the Ministry of Health (in charge of monitoring drinking water quality), the Ministry of Interior (in charge of supervising local government) and the Ministry of Economy and Finance (which supervises the Water Agencies together with the Ministry of Ecology).

Environmental regulation is the responsibility of the Ministry of Ecology. Wastewater discharge standards, drinking water quality standards and the framework for water resources management are defined by the European Union through various directives (see EU water policy). The country's six water agencies (Agences de l'Eau, formerly Agences de Bassins) play an important role to bring together stakeholders at the basin level in a "Water Parliament", in levying water abstraction fees and wastewater discharge fees, and in financing infrastructure with the revenues from these fees.

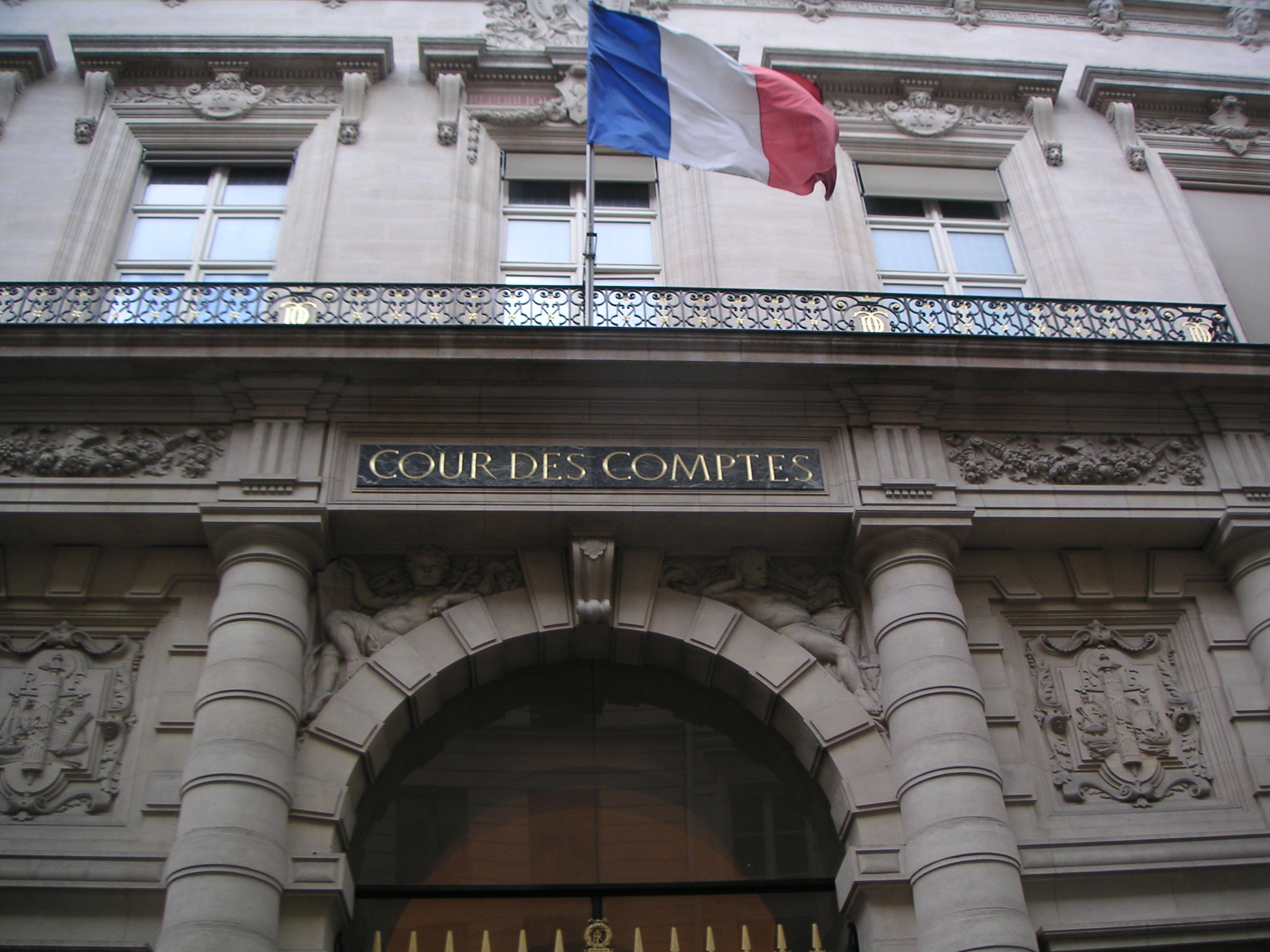
The Cour des Comptes in Paris monitors water and sewer tariffs and utility expenditures

A National Office for Water and the Aquatic Environment (Onema) was created in 2007 under the Ministry of Ecology with the objectives of developing the knowledge of and information about water resources and their uses; enforcing legislation related to water; and to assist local and regional governments in planning the use of water resources. Onema has a good presence on the ground through nine interregional offices and departmental offices. Its functions are related to water resources and not to water supply and sanitation.

Unlike in a few other countries (such as England and Wales, Portugal or Chile) there is no national regulatory agency in France that would approve tariffs and set and control service standards. There are also no regulatory agencies at the level of the Regions and Departments, unlike in US states. The economic regulation of private service provision is undertaken purely by contract through the municipality.

However, the Cour des Comptes (National Audit Entity) plays a role in monitoring water and sewer tariffs as well as expenditures by utilities.

==== Local level ====
At the local level, in municipalities with more than 10,000 inhabitants Consultative Commissions for Local Public Services assist municipalities in regulating service providers. The Commissions were created through the 1992 water law. After the commissions initially met with little success, they were strengthened through another law in 2002. Their purpose now is to provide better information on public services through the review of annual reports by the service providers and to be consulted on key decisions such as the delegation of service provision to the private sector or the creation of a municipal enterprise. The consultative commissions are usually chaired by the mayor and their members are members of the municipal council or are nominated by the municipal council. According to a 2003 report by the Cour des Comptes only few Consultative Committees have been created and, where they have been created, they have sometimes never met.

=== Service provision ===
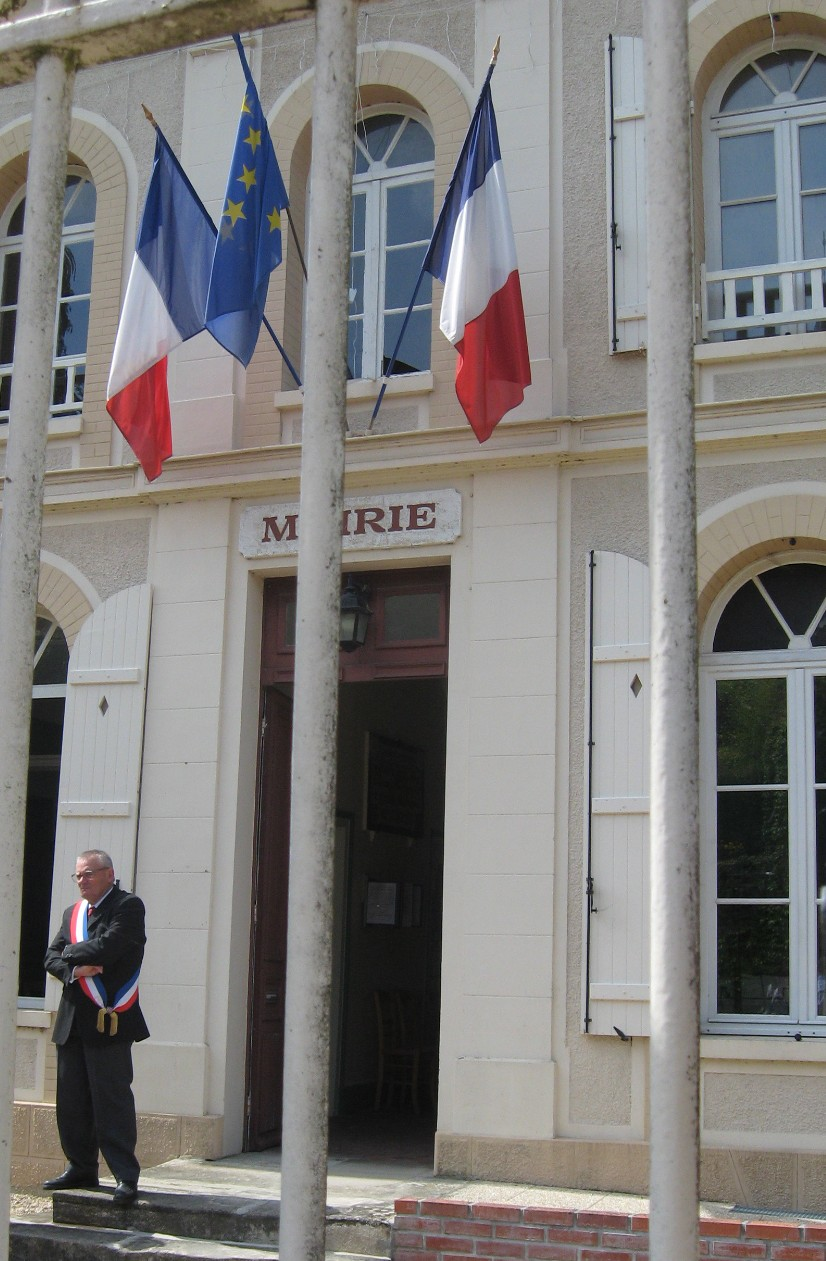
Municipalities (mairies) are in charge of water supply and sanitation services in France, either directly or through municipal associations

There are about 16,700 "organizing entities" (municipalities and municipal associations) in the French sanitation sector and 12,400 in the water sector. Among the 36,700 municipalities in France, at least 23,000 are part of 2,000 intermunicipal utilities with the specific purpose to provide water supply and – in some cases – sanitation services. Sanitation services (understood as sewerage and wastewater treatment in this context) are sometimes provided by the same entity that provides water services, but in some cases they are provided directly by the municipality while an intermunicipal utility is in charge of water supply.

==== Municipal associations ====
Municipal associations (établissements publics de coopération intercommunale, EPCI) play a key role in water and sanitation service provision in France. The first ones were created during the 19th century. Today municipal associations together include 91.7% of French municipalities (33,636) and 86.7% of the French population.

Not all municipal associations provide water and/or sanitation services. Some of them provide only urban transport or solid waste management, while others serve multiple purposes. The most common and oldest form of associations are the syndicats intercommunaux, of which there were 18,504 in January 2008. They do not have powers to levy taxes. 14,885 syndicats intercommunaux serve a single purpose (SIVU), which in the case of some of them is water supply and/or sanitation. The remainder serve multiple purposes (SIVOM).

Subsequent laws created new types of municipal associations that sometimes compete and overlap with the syndicats intercommunaux. In particular the Loi Chevènement of 1999, named after the Ministry of Interior at the time, Jean-Pierre Chevènement, created or reorganized four other forms of municipal associations:

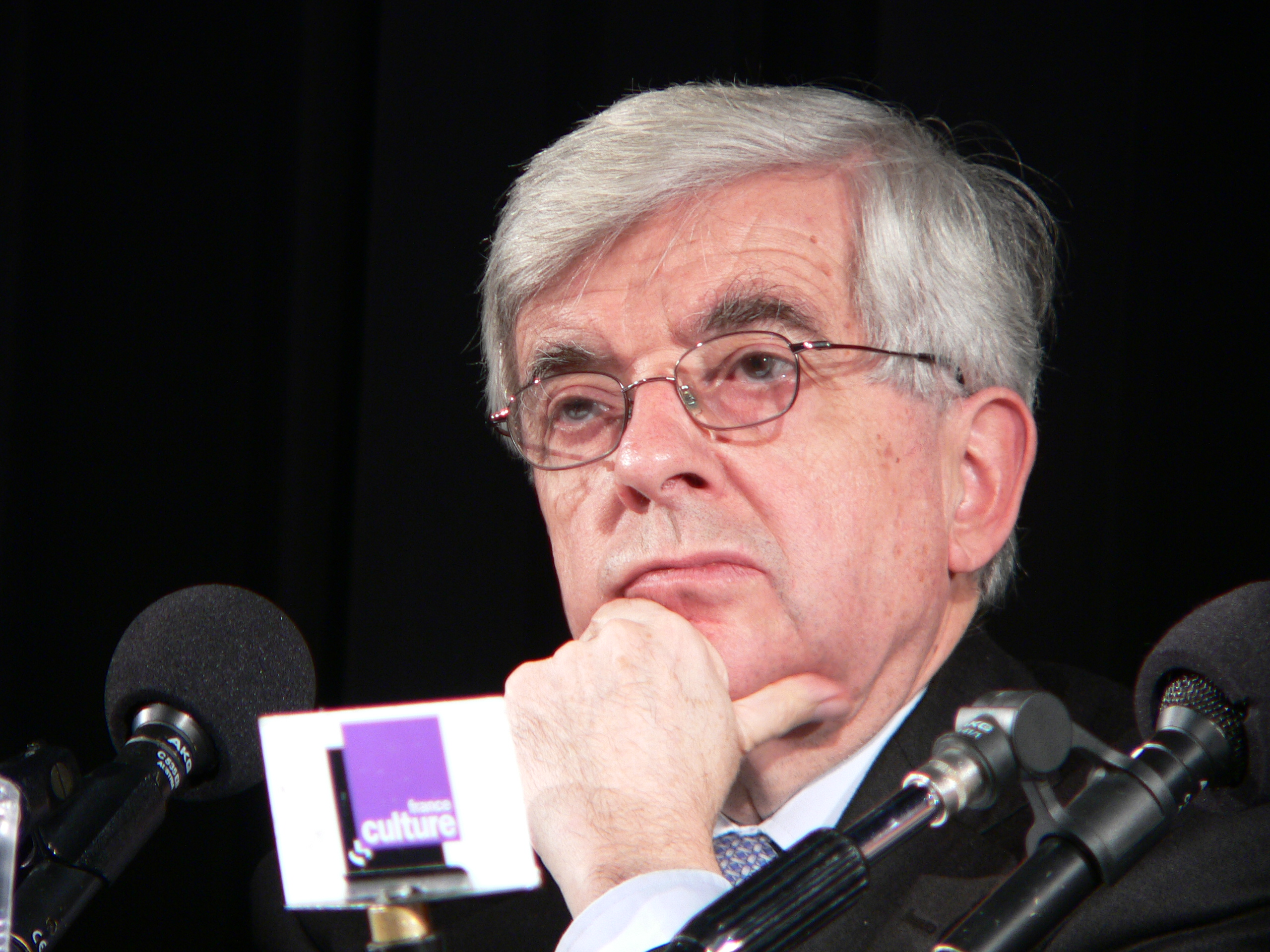
Jean-Pierre Chevènement passed a law to promote and strengthen municipal associations in 1999 while he was Minister of the Interior

- Urban communities (communauté urbaine) with at least 500,000 inhabitants each, created in 1966. There were 14 in January 2008 with a total of 6.2 million inhabitants: Alençon, Arras, Bordeaux, Brest, Cherbourg, Dunkerque, le Creusot-Montceau, Le Mans, Lille, Lyon, Marseille, Nancy, Nantes and Strasbourg
- Communities of agglomerations (communauté d'agglomération) with at least 50,000 inhabitants, created in 1999 merging two previously existing forms of associations. There were 171 communities of agglomerations in January 2008 with a total of 21.9m inhabitants
- Communities of municipalities (communauté de communes), created in 1992 and existing predominantly in rural areas, of which there were 2,393 in January 2008
- 5 syndicats d'agglomération nouvelle with 0.3m inhabitants, created in 1960 and now gradually disappearing.

Unlike the syndicats intercommunaux these four latter types of municipal associations can levy taxes. They also receive subsidies from the national government as an incentive to create the associations, with higher subsidies for the most integrated form of association (urban communities) and lower subsidies for the less integrated forms (community of communities). The syndicats intercommunaux, which do not receive subsidies from the national government and are now somewhat declining in numbers, often count communities of agglomerations and communities of municipalities as their members. The resulting duplication has been criticized as wasteful by the "Black Book of Intercommunality" in 2006. A 2005 report by the Cour des Comptes also stated that the quality of the municipal associations is "not fully satisfactory".

Example:SEDIF An example of a single-purpose intermunicipal association for water supply is the Syndicat des Eaux d'Ile-de-France (SEDIF), which regroups 144 municipalities in the metropolitan area of Paris except for the city of Paris itself. Leaving private service providers apart, it is the largest utility in France, serving more than 4 million users. While SEDIF owns its infrastructure, it has contracted out service provision to the private enterprise Veolia Eau. Some municipalities within SEDIF's service area have chosen to provide water services themselves through communities of municipalities or metropolitan communities.

==== Private sector participation ====
Water privatization in France goes back to the mid-19th century when cities signed concessions with private water companies for the supply of drinking water. Today, according to the Ministry of Environment 75% of water and 50% of sanitation services in France are provided by the private sector, primarily by two firms, Veolia and Suez. In 1993 the Loi Sapin strengthened competition in the sector by limiting the duration of contracts to 20 years, among others. In 2010 the lease contracts for Paris with Suez and Veolia expired and the water system returned to public management (remunicipalization).

==== Measures to strengthen competition and to fight corruption ====
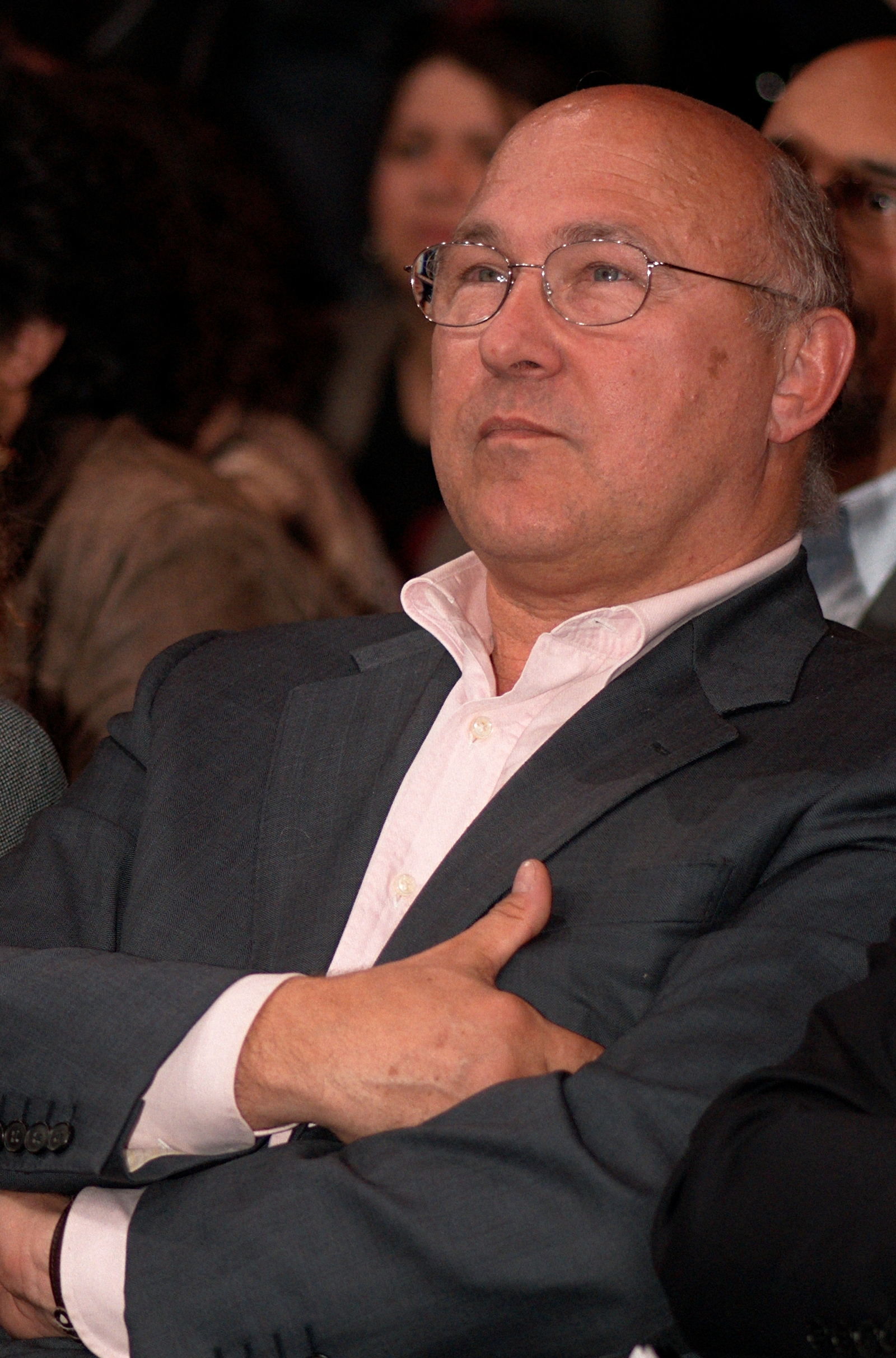
The Socialist politician Michel Sapin initiated a law to prevent corruption, approved in 1993, that was in part triggered by corruption in the water sector

Since the early 1990s a number of measures have been undertaken to strengthen competition, to fight corruption and to improve transparency in the French water and sanitation sector.

===== Loi Sapin =====
In January 1993 the French Parliament approved the Sapin Law (Loi Sapin) concerning the prevention of corruption and on the "transparency of economic life and public procedures". It received its name from Michel Sapin, the Socialist Minister of Economy and Finance at the time. A study by the Water Directorate of the Ministry of Environment, carried out by the consultancy TNS Sofres in 2006, showed the following impact of the law in the water and sanitation sector:

- the average price paid to private operators declined by 9%
- the average duration of contracts (gestion déléguée) has been reduced to 11 years
- the average number of bids by private operators for a given contract has increased from 2.6 to 4.5

However, it also noted that the decline in payments to private operators has not been passed on to consumers, because it is partially or fully compensated by increases in local taxes.

===== Other measures =====
In 2001 the Association of French Mayors has developed a standard contract for water supply and sanitation services that aims at strengthening the position of municipalities vis-à-vis private operators.

In 2002 the Association of French Mayors, the Assembly of French Departments, the Association of French Regions and the Institut de la Gestion Déléguée (IGD) signed a "Charter of Local Public Services". In the charter these entities commit themselves, among others, to the free choice of management models and the reversibility of these choices; objective comparisons between management models; to ensure transparency of costs and to equitably share gains in performance; and to strengthen local democracy and independent evaluations. In order to facilitate objective comparisons through benchmarking, performance indicators should be developed and an Observatory of Local Public Services should be created to monitor the indicators. In 2004 IGD issued a draft document containing 10 proposed performance indicators for water supply and sanitation. Six years later, the observatory has not been created. However, private water companies have collected and published for the first time indicators about their performance in 2008. A decree of May 2007 requires public service providers to provide the same information on service quality to the public that has been provided by private service providers, beginning in 2008.

== Financial aspects ==
=== Tariffs ===
Water and sanitation tariffs in France vary substantially from one service provider to the other. The six French public water agencies regularly publish the results of water tariff surveys (Observatoires de Prix) that they carry out among service providers in the respective areas they cover comparting tariff levels.

According to a 2003 study by the French Supreme Audit Agency (Cour des Comptes), the complexity of water tariffs makes them difficult to understand for users despite efforts to improve the presentation of water bills. The agency also states that flat-rate tariffs that are not linked to consumption levels still persist, although the 1992 water law aimed at linking water tariffs to consumption.

==== International comparison of tariff level ====
According to a study by NUS consulting, in 2007 the average residential water and sanitation tariff for the five largest cities in France was €2.92 per cubic meter for a consumption of 120 cubic meters per connection and year. This was lower than the average of 11 EU countries in the same year, which was €3.25 per cubic meter. According to the same study tariffs were highest in Denmark (€5.63/m3) and Germany (€5.09/m3).

However, for commercial tariffs the picture is somewhat different. According to another study by NUS consulting the average water tariff (without sanitation) in France for a consumption of 10,000 cubic meters pere year was the equivalent of US$1.58, the 5th most expensive out of the 14 countries considered in the study. In the 14 mainly OECD countries tariffs excluding VAT varied between US$0.66 per cubic meter in the United States and the equivalent of US$2.25 per cubic meter in Denmark.

According to a study commissioned by the German water industry association BGW in 2006, the picture is again somewhat different. This study does not compare tariffs per cubic meter, but average water bills. The average annual per capita water bill was 85 Euro in France, the same as in Germany (85 Euro), higher than in Italy (59 Euro) and lower than in England and Wales (95 Euro).

Comparison of annual water and sanitation bills per capita in four EU countries

	Water tariff	Sewer tariff	Total
Germany	85 Euro	111 Euro	196 Euro
England and Wales	95 Euro	93 Euro	188 Euro
France	85 Euro	90 Euro	175 Euro
Italy	59 Euro	40 Euro	99 Euro

Source: Metropolitan Consulting Group: VEWA – Vergleich europaeischer Wasser- und Abwasserpreise, 2006, p. 7 of the executive summary

Equalized costs net of subsidies and taking into account differences in service quality show a different picture: England and Wales have the highest tariffs, followed by France and Germany. Tariffs in Italy remain the lowest, even taking subsidies and differences in service quality into account.

Comparison of annual water and sanitation bills per capita in four EU countries taking into account subsidies and differences in service quality

	Water tariff	Sewer tariff	Total
Germany	84 Euro	119 Euro	203 Euro
England and Wales	106 Euro	138 Euro	244 Euro
France	106 Euro	122 Euro	228 Euro
Italy	74 Euro	85 Euro	159 Euro

=== Costs and affordability ===
In the year 2005

- 46% of water and sanitation tariffs were linked to water treatment and distribution;
- 37% were linked to wastewater collection and treatment;
- 17% corresponded to fees and taxes.

Fees are destined to the six water agencies at the basin level mentioned above. Taxes include a water consumption tax and VAT.

According to a study by the consulting firm BIPE drawing on national statistics the share of household expenditures devoted to water and sewer bills was 0.8% and the average annual water and sewer bill was 374 Euro per household in 2005.

=== Investment ===
Investments in water supply and sanitation were estimated at 5.6 billion Euro in 2007. In 2003 the Association of French Departments estimated that the renewal of the water supply distribution infrastructure alone would require investments of 53 billion Euro from 2004 to 2015 to replace 535,000 km of pipes (about 65% of the entire network). This corresponds to an average of 4.4 billion Euro per year or 80 Euro/capita/year.

=== Financing ===
Investments are financed from a variety of sources. In 2006 investments were financed by municipalities (58%), Water Agencies (18%), private water companies (13%) and subsidies from the Départements and regions (11%). The contribution by municipalities is fully financed from tariff revenues collected for water and sanitation services, as well as by substantial fees (part collectivité) paid by private operators to the municipalities (Euro 2bn in 2006, or 30% of the amount billed by private operators) for the costs of investments (service budget of the municipality). Only in the case of municipalities with less than 3,000 inhabitants some limited tax revenue (general budget) is used to finance water and sanitation investments. The basin agencies finance themselves through charges for water abstraction and wastewater discharge by utilities and industries.

In rural areas, investment subsidies are available from the National Fund for the Development of Water Supply (Fonds National pour le Développement des Adductions d’Eau, FNDAE) This fund, created in 1954, is funded by a surcharge on all water bills (55% of funding) and by a share in the revenues of the public agency in charge of organizing horse race betting, the Pari Mutuel Urbain (45%). The FNDAE has an annual budget of 145m Euro. It is managed by the Ministry of Agriculture and Fisheries and its departmental branches.

=== Decentralized international cooperation ===
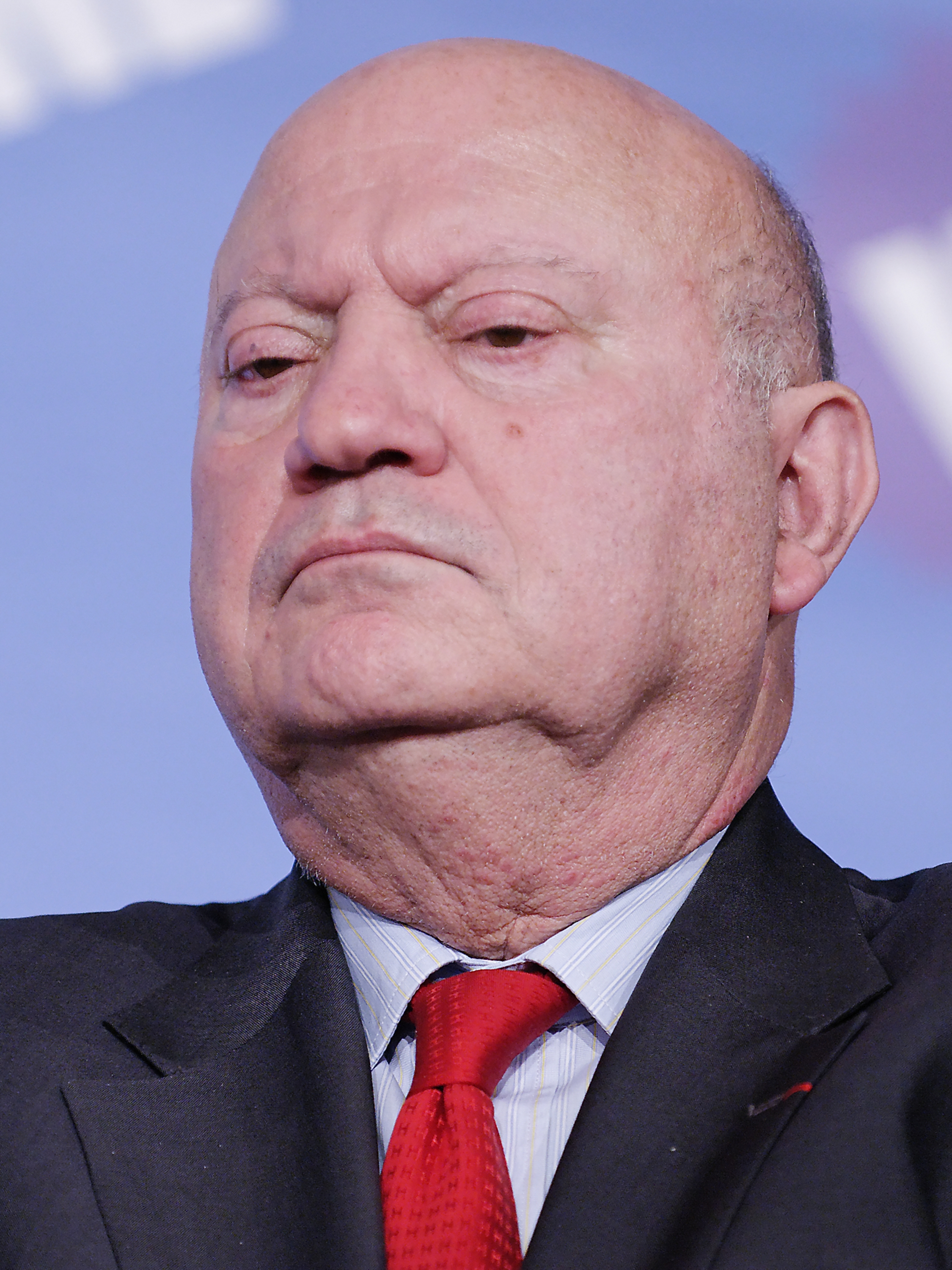
Conservative politician André Santini submitted a law that allows water agencies and water companies to use funds for international cooperation

Some municipalities and water agencies are engaged in international cooperation to improve access to water supply and sanitation in developing countries. As opposed to "centralized" international cooperation implemented by the French Development Agency or multilateral development banks, in France this form of aid is called decentralized cooperation. In 2002 the Court of Audit of France condemned decentralized cooperation by water agencies as contrary to their objectives. In response, the conservative member of Parliament André Santini, President of the Council of the Water Agency for Seine-Normandie and President of SEDIF, the utility in charge of water supply in the region of Paris, introduced a law passed in 2005 named after himself and former Senator Jacques Oudin. The Loi Oudin-Santini allows water agencies and municipal water companies to spend up to 1% of their budget on international cooperation. According to the NGO psEau the law could mobilize up to Euro 100 million. However, far from all water companies make use of the option provided by the law. The NGO s-eau-s (pronounced SOS) criticized the law, because it allegedly promotes the "export of the French water management model" and the "conquest of markets by big French water companies".

== Efficiency (water losses) ==
According to a report by the Association of Private Water Companies in France (FP2E), water losses stood at 19% of water production in 2010 (81% efficiency of the supply network, losses being equal to 100% minus the efficiency of the supply network), up from 18% in 2008.

According to a study commissioned by the German water industry association BGW water losses in the distribution network in France have been estimated at an average 26 percent, compared to only 7 percent in Germany, 19 percent in England/Wales and 29 percent in Italy The study states that its methodology allows for an accurate comparison, including water used to flush pipes and for firefighting. This is consistent with the International Water Association's definition of non-revenue water, which includes authorized non-metered consumption such as for flushing and firefighting.

According to a 2002 study by the Association of French Departments, non-revenue water was actually slightly higher and stood at 28%.

== See also ==
- EU water policy
- Sandre
