= Water pricing =

Water pricing is a term that covers various processes to assign a price to water. These processes differ greatly under different circumstances.

== Agricultural water pricing ==
Aside from the views that advocate raising water prices, there are two distinct views: The first declares that agricultural water should be free of charge to the farmers because it returns to the hydrological cycle. The second view stipulates that instead of raising water prices in agriculture sector, the cost of water supply for agriculture should be reduced by new technologies. It is advised that before adjusting agricultural water price, institutional reforms are required based on the experiences of other countries and establishing local water distribution cooperatives.

== Institutional and behavioural factors in agricultural water pricing ==
The effectiveness of agricultural water pricing depends on the interaction between economic incentives, farmers' behavioural responses, and the institutional and socioeconomic conditions governing agricultural water use. Increasing irrigation water prices does not necessarily lead to proportional reductions in water consumption, particularly when farmers face financial constraints, limited access to efficient irrigation technologies, or insufficient opportunities to diversify their livelihoods. Under such conditions, pricing interventions implemented in isolation may impose additional economic burdens on agricultural communities without achieving sustained improvements in water-use efficiency.

Integrating water pricing with complementary institutional and socioeconomic measures can improve policy effectiveness. Such measures include financial and technical support for irrigation modernization, enforcement of water extraction regulations, farmer education and vocational training, and the development of alternative employment opportunities. Coordinated interventions can enhance farmers' capacity to adapt to higher water prices, reduce dependence on water-intensive agricultural activities, and support long-term water conservation. Consequently, the effectiveness of agricultural water pricing depends not only on tariff structures but also on the broader institutional capacity and socioeconomic conditions that influence farmers' adaptation and water-use decisions.

== Effective and efficient water pricing ==
Key to effective and efficient water pricing is a systematic process to understand: (i) the value of water in alternative uses; (ii) the private and external costs of supplying water services; and (iii) the multiple options to determine an appropriate water tariff. Within the four dimensions of water pricing (uniform versus variable tariff and flat charge versus volumetric pricing), there is an almost infinite number of possible pricing combinations. Within this choice set, the preferred water tariff depends on multiple factors including: the goals of water pricing; the capacity of a water services supplier to allocate its costs, to price water, and to collect revenues from its customers; the price responsiveness of water consumers; and what is considered to be a fair or just water tariff.

== Bottled water ==
Prices for bottled water are set in the market, but must be seen not as much as a price of water, than the price of the convenience, bottle and transportation. It is comparable to other bottled cheap beverages (soda, beer, ...). Retail prices vary widely between countries, brands, bottle sizes (0.33 liter to 20 liters) and place of sale (supermarket, fair, restaurant etc.). They range from US$0.05 to US$6 per liter, equivalent to US$50 to US$6,000 per cubic meter.

== Tanker trucks ==
Prices for water sold by tanker trucks in bulk, which is common in cities of some developing countries for households without access to piped water supply, are set in the market. Prices for trucked water vary between about US$1 and US$6 per cubic meter.

== Utility tariffs ==
Prices for piped water supply provided by utilities, be they publicly or privately managed, are determined administratively (see water tariffs). They vary from US$0.01 to almost US$8 per cubic meter (including sewer tariffs).

Portland 2.17 gallons cost $0.01

== Irrigation ==
Prices for irrigation water that is being provided by a public agency are also typically determined administratively, usually using a flat rate, since metering is not common in agriculture in most countries of the world.

The following pricing systems exist for irrigation:

- Area-based tariffs, sometimes differentiated by type of crop grown
- Volumetric pricing, which requires measurement

Tariffs can be paid in the form of labor, which holds mainly in communal types of management in traditional irrigation systems, or in cash. Tariffs can also vary between seasons, with higher tariffs charged during the dry season.

== Direct abstraction ==
In most countries there is no charge for abstracting water directly from rivers, lakes and aquifers. However, some countries do levy volumetric charges or fees for water abstraction rights. These charges are typically levied on industries, utilities and farmers. Fees for water abstraction and discharge exist for example in France, where revenues are significant and are re-invested in the water sector by water agencies established in major basins. In Germany abstraction fees exist only for groundwater and only in some states, and their proceeds go into the general state budget. Mexico also charges for water abstraction and returns proceeds to utilities, but not to industries. Outside the OECD countries few countries charge water abstraction fees. Where they are applied the level of fees tends to be nominal, such as in Morocco, or enforcement is partial, such as for groundwater abstraction fees in Jordan. In almost all countries that have introduced abstraction fees agriculture, the major water user worldwide, is exempted from abstraction fees. Some countries allow water rights to be traded, so that the price for water itself is formed in the market. Such water trading exist in parts of Australia, Chile and the Southwestern United States).
