= Water supply and sanitation in Germany =

Data
- Water coverage (broad definition): 100%
- Sanitation coverage (broad definition): 100%
- Share of collected wastewater treated: 100%
- Continuity of supply: 100%
- Average urban water use (L/person/day): 121 (2010)
- Average urban water and sanitation tariff (US$/m^{3}): €32/month
- Share of household metering: 100%
- Share of self-financing by utilities: 100%
- Share of tax-financing: 0%
- Share of external financing: 0%
- Non-revenue water: 7% (2001)

Institutions
- Decentralization to municipalities: Full
- National water and sanitation company: None
- Water and sanitation regulator: None
- Responsibility for policy setting: Not clearly defined
- Sector law: None
- Service providers: About 6,000

Public water supply and sanitation in Germany is universal and of good quality. Some salient features of the sector compared to other developed countries are its very low per capita water use, the high share of advanced wastewater treatment and very low distribution losses. Responsibility for water supply and sanitation provision lies with municipalities, which are regulated by the states. Professional associations and utility associations play an important role in the sector. As in other EU countries, most of the standards applicable to the sector are set in Brussels (see EU water policy). Recent developments include a trend to create commercial public utilities under private law and an effort to modernize the sector, including through more systematic benchmarking.

== Access to water and sanitation ==
		Urban (88% of the population)	Rural (12% of the population)	Total
Water	Broad definition	100%	100%	100%
	House connections	100%	97%	100%
Sanitation	Broad definition	100%	100%	100%
	Sewerage	94	93%	93%

Source: Joint Monitoring Program WHO/UNICEF(JMP/2006). Data for water and sanitation based on Health for All database, WHO Regional Office for Europe (1990).

Access to safe water and adequate sanitation in Germany is universal. More than 98 percent of users are connected to a public water supply system. The remainder is served by private wells. 93 percent of users are connected to sewers. The remainder is connected to various types of on-site sanitation systems.

== Water use ==
About 80 percent of public water use is accounted for by residential and small commercial users. The remainder is accounted for by industries supplied from public water systems (14 percent) and other users (6 percent).

Residential and small commercial water use is the second lowest among 14 European countries and only a fraction of what it is in North America. Despite forecasts about increasing per capita water use, use actually declined from 145 liter/capita/day in 1990 to only 121 liter/capita/day in 2010.

Low water consumption has had some negative operational, health and even environmental impacts. On the operational side, sewers have to be flushed occasionally with injected drinking water in order to prevent stagnation of raw sewage. On the health side, there are concerns about potable water contamination due to low flows. On the environmental side, in some cities such as Berlin water tables are rising and cause damage to the foundations of buildings because of decreased pumping of groundwater by utilities.

== Water resources and public water supply ==
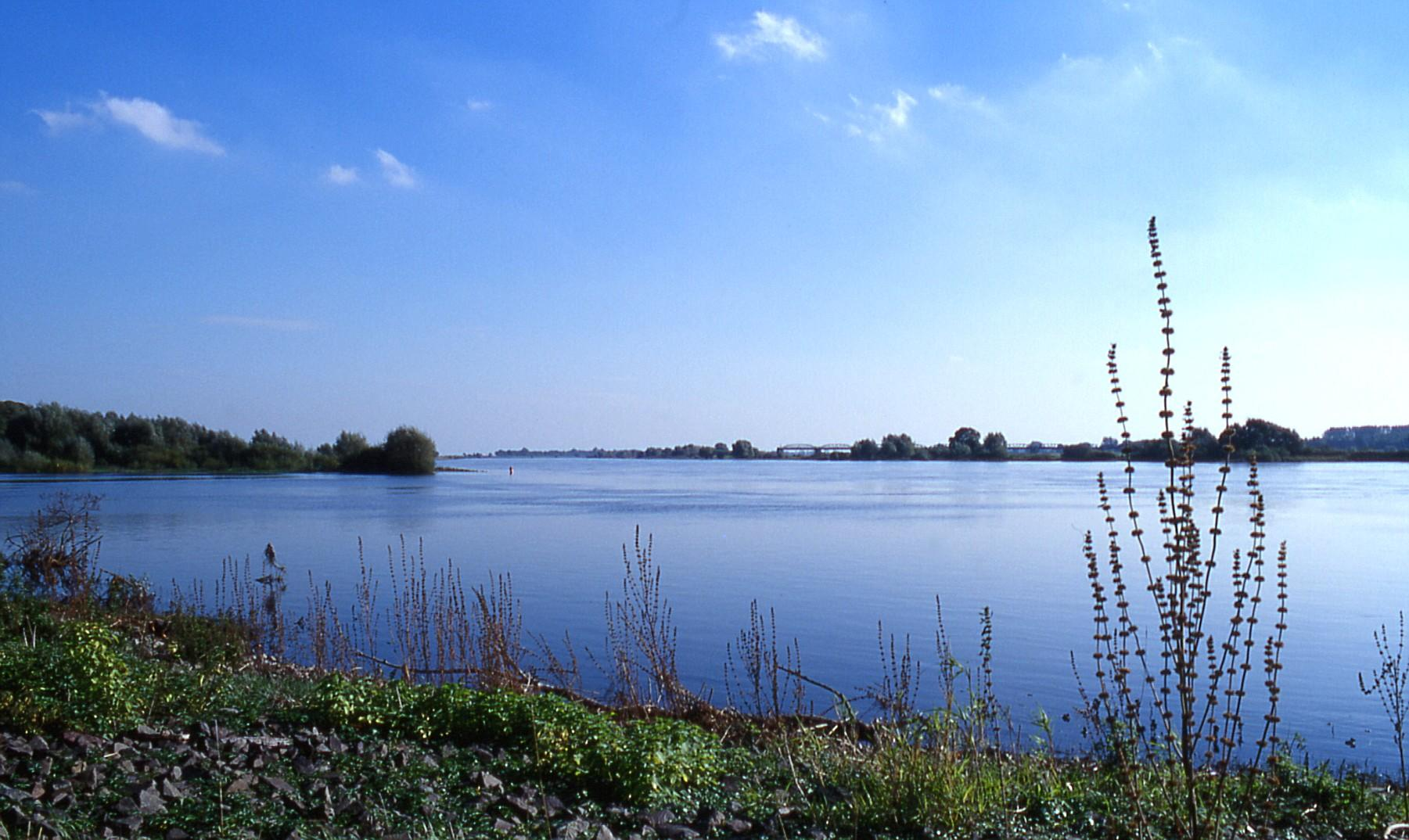
The river Elbe is a source of water supply for many German cities, including Dresden which partially relies on bank filtration from the river.

Water is not scarce in Germany, except for occasional localized droughts. Public water utilities extract only 3 percent of total renewable water resources in Germany, or 5.4 billion cubic metres out of 182 billion cubic metres annually.

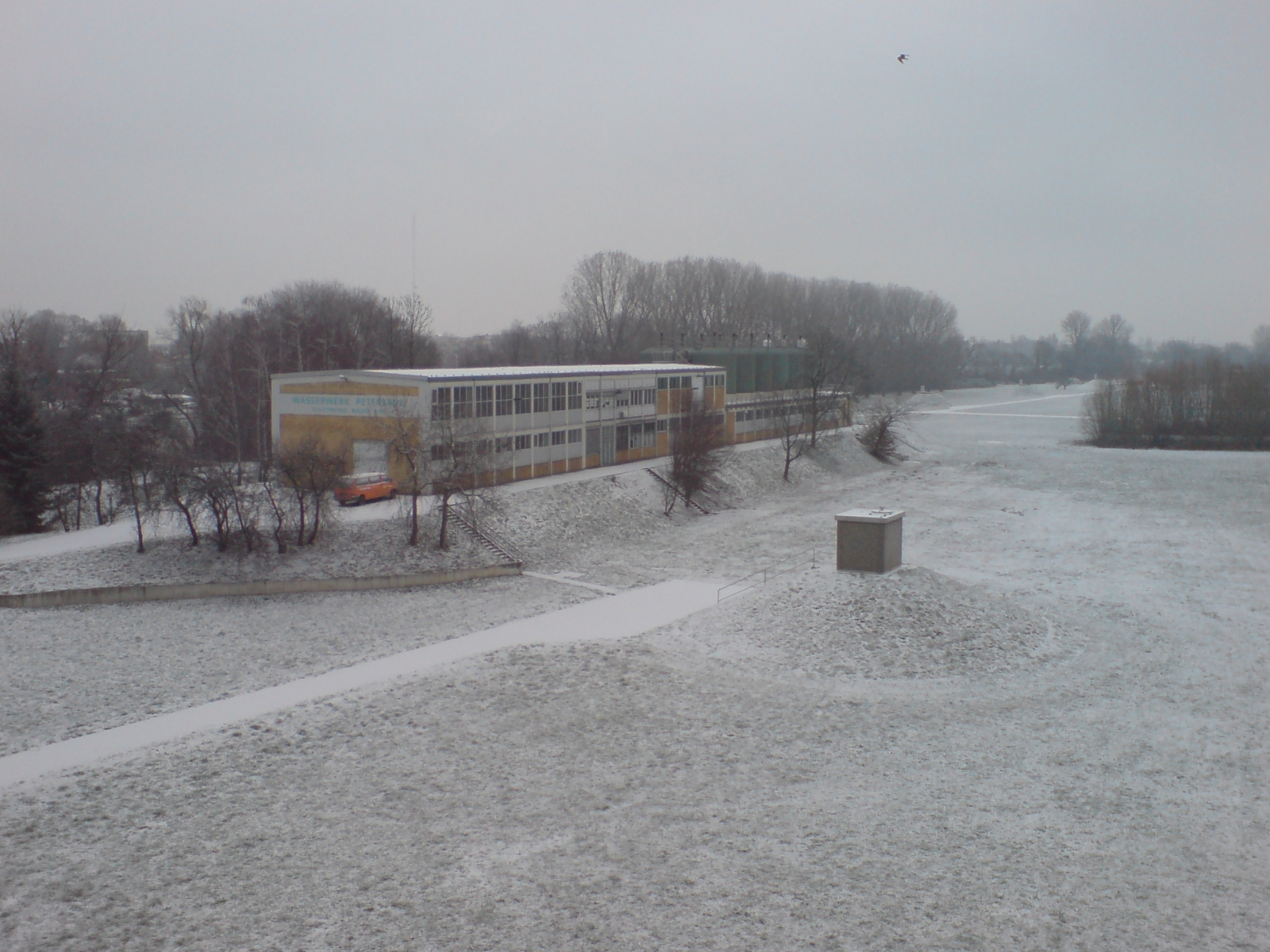
Bank filtration plant in Mainz, Germany. Extraction well on small hill visible in foreground. The Rhine is several dozen metres to the right outside of the picture.

The sources of public water supply are as follows:

- 65% from groundwater
- 9% from springs
- 5% from bank filtration, i.e. from wells close to rivers and lakes, drawing essentially surface water
- 20% from surface water

== Service quality ==
Water supply in Germany is continuous, at good pressure, and drinking water quality is excellent, as evidenced by the universal compliance with the EU drinking water directive. Wastewater treatment is universal. 94 percent of municipal wastewater is treated according to the highest EU standards including nutrient elimination, a much higher percentage than in France (36 percent) or in England and Wales (39 percent).

== Consumer perceptions ==
According to a 2007 national survey for the business association BDEW (BDEW customer barometer) 92% of customers were satisfied or very satisfied with the quality of their drinking water. 82% were satisfied or very satisfied with the service provided by their drinking water provider. 79% were satisfied or very satisfied with the service provided by their wastewater utility. The survey also showed that customers significantly overestimate the price of water and wastewater services compared to the actual price.

== Human resources ==
It is estimated that the total number of those directly employed in German water and sanitation utilities is far more than 100,000.

== Infrastructure ==
The length of the drinking water network in Germany is estimated to be more than 500,000 km. The length of the sewer network in 2004 was estimated by the Federal Statistical Office to be 515,000 km, divided as follows:

- 238,000 km of combined sewers
- 171,000 km of sanitary sewers
- 106,000 km of stormwater sewers

There were 9,994 wastewater treatment plants in Germany in 2004.

== Responsibility ==
=== Service provision ===
Public water supply and sanitation in Germany are responsibilities of municipalities, of which there were more than 12,000 in 2008. Smaller municipalities often associate in municipal associations to provide water and/or sanitation services. Municipalities or municipal associations in turn can delegate these responsibilities to municipal companies, private companies or public-private partnerships.

There are about 6,400 public water service providers and about 6,900 sanitation service providers in Germany. With a few exceptions, water and sanitation services are typically provided by different entities in the same locality, with sanitation bills being collected by the water utility on behalf of the entity in charge of sanitation.

==== Water supply ====
Among the 1,266 larger water service providers about 15 percent are municipal utilities under public law (Eigenbetriebe); 16 percent are inter-municipal utilities (Zweckverbände); 63 percent are utilities under private or mixed law either under private, public or mixed ownership.; and 6 percent are water and land associations (Wasser- und Bodenverbände). Only 3.5 percent of service providers were entirely privately owned (no figures are available on companies with mixed ownership, an increasingly prevalent form of ownership).

==== Sanitation ====
Unlike public water supply, sanitation is considered a sovereign core responsibility (hoheitliche Kernaufgabe) of municipalities in Germany. This implies that, unlike water supply, it is exempt from VAT and corporate taxes. It also implies that companies under private law cannot directly provide sanitation services. The great majority of municipalities thus provide sanitation directly through a municipal sanitation department (Regiebetrieb). Less than 10 percent of the 6,000 sanitation providers are utilities under public law, and none are utilities under private law. However, municipalities or municipal utilities can sign operating contracts (Betreiberverträge) with private companies. Out of the 900 largest sanitation service providers, about 10 percent have signed such contracts for sewerage services and 12 percent for wastewater treatment services.

==== Examples of large water and sanitation service providers ====
The largest privately owned public water company is Gelsenwasser AG, although 92,9% of it are still owned by various municipalities, which is a multi-utility company (water, sanitation and natural gas distribution) serving 3.2 million inhabitants in North Rhine-Westphalia, under concession agreements with 39 municipalities, and many other localities throughout Germany and internationally.

An example of a publicly owned large multi-utility (water, electricity generation and distribution, natural gas distribution) is the Mainova AG in Frankfurt.

The Berliner Wasserbetriebe, an Institution under Public Law (Anstalt des öffentlichen Rechts), is the largest communal water service provider after its remunicipalisation in 2013, serving 3.5 million people with water and 3.9 million people with sanitation services.

=== Policy and regulation ===
Responsibility for policy setting in public water supply and sanitation in Germany is shared between the EU, the federal government and state governments (Länder). (For more details on the role of the Länder and municipalities see States of Germany) The EU sets the framework legislation for water quality and water resources management (see EU water policy). The organization of public water supply and sanitation, however, remains a prerogative of EU member states. The German states (Länder) play a key role in the sector by setting, among other things, the legal framework for tariff approvals. Municipalities, legally entrusted with service provision, play an indirect role in influencing policy positions related to water and sanitation through their influential municipal associations (the Deutsche Städtetag representing the largest cities and towns and the Deutscher Städte- und Gemeindebund representing smaller cities and towns).

There are no autonomous regulatory agencies for water and sanitation in Germany at the state or federal level. The recently created federal regulatory agency for network industries (Federal Network Agency) covers telecommunications, postal services, electricity, gas and rail. It does not cover water supply and sanitation, since it is a responsibility of the states. Water and sanitation tariffs are approved through different procedures in each state, usually by a department in the state Ministry of Economy after a review of the tariff increase request by an independent auditor. In city-states (Berlin, Hamburg, Bremen) this means that the Minister (called Senator) of Economy both requests the tariff increase in his capacity as chairman of the board of the utility and also approves it, which constitutes a conflict of interest. In the case of some private utilities, tariffs are set by a mutually agreed arbitrator based on the professional opinion of an auditor.

Drinking water quality is monitored by the public health departments of municipalities and counties (Landkreise). Environmental monitoring is largely based on self-monitoring, which has proven to be reliable, and occasional samples by environmental Ministries of the states.

=== Business associations ===
Industry associations and professional associations also play an important role in self-regulating the water and sanitation sector (verbandliche Selbstverwaltung). In early 2007 there were six associations in the sector. They include two industry associations, the Association of Electricity and Water Utilities BDEW and the VKU (association of municipal utilities); two professional associations, the DWA (professional association for water and sanitation), BVGW (professional association for gas and water); and two associations specialized on sub-sectors, the ATT (working group of dam operators providing drinking water) and DBVW (association of land and water associations). In particular the two professional associations play an important role assisting in the development of technical norms and, more recently, in performance benchmarking.

=== Recent developments: debate on liberalization and modernization ===
A study commissioned in 2000 by the Ministry of Economy suggested to liberalize the German water sector, allowing competition similar to the telecommunications and electricity sectors. The proposal met with harsh criticism, including from the Federal Environment Agency (UBA) and the associations of municipalities, which alleged that liberalization could entail setbacks for the protection of health and the environment. The liberalization proposal was not further pursued. However, public-private partnerships continued to become more widespread and the trend towards the creation of private law water utilities (commercialization) continued.

In reaction to the liberalization debate the German Federal Parliament (Bundestag) passed a decision sponsored by the Green party and the Social-democrats (SPD) on sustainable water supply and sanitation (nachhaltige Wasserwirtschaft) in 2001. The decision rejected the liberalization of the water sector, but also called for the merging of smaller service providers, higher competitiveness and the general modernization of the sector, including through systematic performance benchmarking. In 2005, the six professional associations signed a declaration promoting benchmarking, based on a methodology developed by the International Water Association.

== Efficiency ==
=== Water losses ===
Water losses in the distribution network have been estimated at only 7 percent in 2001, down from 11 percent in 1991. According to a study commissioned by the BGW losses are 19 percent in England/Wales, 26 percent in France and 29 percent in Italy. These would not only be the lowest water losses in the four countries, but also in the world. The study states that its methodology allows for an accurate comparison, including water used to flush pipes and for firefighting. This is consistent with the International Water Association's definition of non-revenue water, which includes authorized non-metered consumption such as for flushing and firefighting.

=== Benchmarking ===
Benchmarking has been undertaken for a long period by German utilities, but not in a comprehensive and systematic manner. In 1998 the Federal Ministry of Education and Research initiated a competition of ideas to reduce the costs of water supply together with the economic research institute RWI and 14 water utilities. It developed a set of criteria to assess strengths and weaknesses in the industry. Participating utilities say that they reduced their operating costs by about 5 percent after two to three years. The professional associations DVGW and DWA have jointly established a voluntary benchmarking system, which keeps individual company data confidential. The associations consider the system as being highly successful.

== Tariffs and cost recovery ==
=== Legal framework ===
By law (Kommunalabgabengesetze or Betriebsgesetze der Länder) tariffs must cover the full costs of water supply and sanitation, including capital replacement and the remuneration of equity. The various state laws do not foresee a review of the level of the efficiency of investments and operations as part of the tariff approval procedure. Some states also levy a resource charge for groundwater abstractions which is passed on by utilities to the consumers. There is no such a charge for surface water abstraction, however.

Utilities also pay a wastewater discharge fee which depends on the degree of pollution of the discharged treated wastewater. The discharge fee is supposed to provide an incentive to treat water beyond what is legally required (Abwasserabgabengesetz). It accounts for about 3 percent of total sanitation costs.

=== Tariff levels ===
In 2004 water tariffs averaged 1.81 euro per cubic meter including VAT, and sanitation tariffs averaged 2.14 euro per cubic meter.

According to NUS consulting water tariffs in Germany (without sanitation) were the highest of 16 mainly OECD countries at the equivalent of US$2.25 per cubic meter, about on par with tariffs in Denmark.

However, according to a study commissioned by the German industry association BGW in 2006, the average household water bill was only 82 euro per year in Germany, lower than in France or in England and Wales, but higher than in Italy. The study shows that subsidies are more prevalent in the three comparator countries and service levels are lower. Taking into account these differences, the cost of supplying water at an equalized service level would be 84 euros in Germany, 106 euro in both France and England/Wales, and 74 euro in Italy. The apparent discrepancy between higher unit tariffs and lower bills is due to the lower water consumption in Germany. Water tariffs have remained stable in real terms over the past ten years.

Comparison of annual water and sanitation bills per capita in four EU countries:

	Water tariff	Sewer tariff	Total
Germany	85 euro	111 euro	196 euro
England and Wales	95 euro	93 euro	188 euro
France	85 euro	90 euro	175 euro
Italy	59 euro	40 euro	99 euro

Concerning sanitation, unequalized tariffs are by far the highest in Germany at 111 euro per year. Equalized costs net of subsidies are, however, highest in England and Wales with 138 euro, followed by France (122 euro), Germany (119 euro) and Italy (85 euro).

=== Metering ===
Metering is widespread in Germany and almost universal for single family homes. However, many apartments do not have their own meter, so that households living in apartments where only the consumption of the entire house is metered have little financial incentive to conserve water.

== Investments and financing ==
In 2005 investments stood at 7.8 billion euros, including 5.5 billion euros for sanitation and 2.3 billion euros for water supply. Financing is predominantly through debt and ultimately through user fees. Commercial debt is issued directly by the municipalities in the form of municipal bonds (Kommunalanleihen) or by utilities. The development Bank KfW also provides long-term credit for up to 30 years (Kommunalkredit) for municipal investments, including water supply and sanitation.

According to the professional associations of the sector there is no investment backlog (Investitionsstau).

== See also ==
- EU water policy
- Sodenbrunnen
