= Water supply and sanitation in the European Union =

Water supply and sanitation (WSS) is the responsibility of each member state of the European Union (EU), but in the 21st century union-wide policies have come into effect. Water resources are limited and supply and sanitation systems are under pressure from urbanisation and climate change. Indeed, the stakes are high as the European Environmental Agency found that one European out of ten already suffers a situation of water scarcity and the IEA measured the energy consumption of the water sector to be equivalent to 3,5% of the electricity consumption of the EU.

== Directives ==
The water policy of the EU is primarily codified in the following directives:

- The Bathing Waters Directive (76/160/EEC) of 1976 replaced by the Directive 2006/7/EC;
- The Urban Waste Water Treatment Directive (91/271/EEC) of 21 May 1991 concerning discharges of municipal and some industrial waste waters;
- The Water Framework Directive (2000/60/EC) of 23 October 2000 concerning water resources management;
- The Drinking Water Directive (2020/2184) of 16 December 2020 concerning the quality of water intended for human consumption (codifying 98/83/EC amendments).

EU member states have enacted national legislation in accordance with these directives. The institutional organisation of public water supply and sanitation does not fall under the purview of the EU, but remains a prerogative of each member state.

== Urban Waste Water Treatment Directive of 1991 ==
The Council Directive on Urban Waste Water Treatment concerns the collection, treatment and discharge of urban waste water and the treatment and discharge of waste water from certain industrial sectors. Its aim is to protect the environment from any adverse effects due to discharge of such waters.

According to the directive's timetable:

- by 31 December 1998: all agglomerations of more than 10 000 population equivalents (PE) which discharge water into sensitive areas had to have a proper collection and treatment system requiring meeting the most stringent quality standards, usually referred to as tertiary treatment (Art. 5);
- by 31 December 2000: agglomerations of more than 15 000 p.e. outside sensitive areas had to have a collection and treatment system which enables them to satisfy less stringent requirements, usually referred to as secondary treatment (Art. 4);
- by 31 December 2005: all agglomerations of between 2 000 and 10 000 PE. which discharge water into sensitive areas, and all agglomerations of between 2 000 and 15 000 p.e. which do not discharge into such areas had to have a collection and treatment system (Art. 3).

However, in the case of Spain changes were made at the time of transposing the Directive. In Article 2 of the Directive, a collecting system means "a system of conduits which collects and conducts urban waste water" and therefore all sewers and drains, both public and private were included. However, in the Spanish transposition (Real Decreto-Ley 11/1995 of 28 December 1995), the definition of a collecting system was changed to mean "all systems of conduits which collect and conduct urban waste water, from the municipal sewer and drainage networks and go to the treatment plants". The added words mean that when the Spanish definition is applied to Article 3 of the Directive the municipal sewer and drainage networks are excluded. If the municipal network did not exist, as in the case of many urbanisations (housing estates) developed in the 1960s and 1970s and within agglomerations of over 2000 p.e. no collecting system needed to be provided at all, under the Real Decreto-Ley 11/1995. Obviously if waste water is not collected it cannot be treated, therefore the changed definition also affected Article 4 of the Directive. Even so, Spain had to and still has to comply fully with the Directive. On 5 March 2009, the Catalan Autonomous Government finally approved a law (La Llei de la millora d’urbanizacions) to deal with deficits of infrastructures, such as sewers in urbanisations in Catalonia, 18 years after the Directive was approved by the European Parliament.

The directive also allows the establishment of less sensitive coastal areas, for which primary treatment would be sufficient, if it can be shown that there is no adverse impact on the environment (Art. 6).

Member states had to establish lists of sensitive areas. It has been estimated that in 2004 about 34 percent of the pollutant load from wastewater that falls under the scope of the directive is discharged into sensitive areas.

This Directive was amended by the Commission Directive 98/15/EC.

=== Implementation challenges ===
Commission Decision 93/481/EEC defines the information that Member States should provide the commission on the state of implementation of the Directive.

The European Commission published three reports on the implementation of the directive, the latest in 2004. The report noted that the wastewater treatment situation in Europe is still very unsatisfactory and that none of the deadlines has been met by all member countries. Only Austria, Denmark and Germany fully complied with the directive. The report noted that BOD levels in European rivers have been reduced by 20–30 percent since the enactment of the directive, but that other pollution parameters such as nitrogen levels remained high. The reason is that much of the nitrogen pollution comes from non-point sources in agriculture, and the still insufficient nutrient removal by wastewater treatment plants. The eutrophication of the Baltic Sea, North Sea and considerable parts of the Mediterranean thus remains a "severe problem". The report also noted that it is estimated that more than 50 percent of the discharges into sensitive areas was not treated sufficiently. Even for non-sensitive areas, although the picture was less bleak, only 69% of the discharge received treatment and the 2000 deadline was not met by most member countries. 25 out of 556 cities in the EU still had no wastewater treatment system at all.

The directive triggered substantial investment in sewage treatment throughout the EU. A controversial aspect of the directive is the requirement for all agglomerations with more than 2,000 inhabitants to have a wastewater collection system, which has been widely interpreted as requiring connection to a sewer system even if existing on-site sanitation systems perform adequately. The cost of connecting houses to sewers in small rural towns with dispersed housing patterns is often very high and imposes a high financial burden on users.

According to the European Commission, the directive represents the most cost intensive European legislation in the environmental sector. The EU estimates that the equivalent of €152 billion were invested in wastewater treatment from 1990 to 2010. The EU provides support for the implementation of the directive in the order of 5 billion Euro per year.

=== Planned revision ===
The European Commission is currently undergoing a consultation on the Urban Waste Water Treatment Directive. As the directive was adopted in 1991, its challenge will be to integrate the commitments taken with the Paris agreement as the wastewater treatment sector consumes 1% of the global total energy consumption. Under a business as usual scenario, this figure is expected to increase by 60% by 2040 compared to 2014. With the introduction of energy efficiency requirements, the energy consumption of the wastewater treatment sector can be reduced by 50% only by using current technologies. On top of that, there are also opportunities to produce enough energy from wastewater to turn the whole water sector energy neutral. It uses the energy embedded in the sludge by producing biogas through anaerobic digestion. These features have been mainly overlooked due to the over-riding objective for utilities to meet existing and future needs for wastewater treatment. In the European Union, 0.8% of total energy consumption goes to wastewater treatment facilities.

== Drinking water directive of 1998 ==
=== Content ===
The Directive is intended to protect human health by laying down healthiness and purity requirements which must be met by drinking water within the Community (see water quality). It applies to all water intended for human consumption apart from natural mineral waters and waters which are medicinal products.

Member States shall ensure that such drinking water:

- does not contain any concentration of micro-organisms, parasites or any other substance which constitutes a potential human health risk;
- meets the minimum requirements (microbiological and chemical parameters and those relating to radioactivity) laid down by the directive.
- They will take any other action needed to guarantee the healthiness and purity of water intended for human consumption.

In setting contaminant levels the directive applies the precautionary principle. For example, the EU contaminant levels for pesticides are up to 20 times lower than those in the WHO drinking water guidelines, because the EU directive not only aims at protecting human health but also the environment. The WHO contaminant levels themselves are already set so that there would be no potential risk if the contaminant was absorbed continuously over a person's lifetime. EU drinking water standards and cases where these standards are temporarily exceeded by a small margin should be interpreted in this context.

Compared to the previous European drinking water directive of 1980 the number of parameters has been reduced, allowing member to add parameters such as magnesium, total hardness, phenols, zinc, phosphate, calcium and chlorite.

The directive requires member states to regularly monitor the quality of water intended for human consumption by using the methods of analysis specified in the directive, or equivalent methods. Member states also have to publish drinking water quality reports every three years, and the European Commission is to publish a summary report. Within five years Member States had to comply with the Directive. Exemptions can be granted on a temporary basis, provided that they do not affect human health.

=== Implementation challenges and planned revision ===
Until 2006 the European Commission has not published a summary report on drinking water quality. No EU country achieves full compliance with the directive, mainly because of the geological nature of its soil and agricultural activity. in 2003 the European Commission initiated a broad consultation process to prepare a revision of the Directive. One key aspect of the revision would be to move away from a pure end-of-pipe standard setting approach. Instead the whole water supply process from the basin to the tap would be assessed to identify risk and the most effective control points, through so-called Water safety plans. Another important challenge will be to integrate the new environmental, climate and energy goals of the EU. The issue is substantial as in average 23% of the treated water in the EU is leaked, with some countries facing leakage rates as high as 60%.

== Water Framework Directive of 2000 ==
=== Content ===
Under this Directive, member states have to identify all the river basins lying within their national territory and assign them to individual river basin districts. By 22 December 2003 at the latest, a competent authority had to be designated for each of the river basin districts. In addition, member states have to analyse the characteristics of each river basin and have to carry out an economic analysis of water use. Nine years after the entry into force of the directive, a management plan must be produced for each river basin district. The measures provided for in the river basin management plan seek to:

- prevent deterioration, enhance and restore bodies of surface water, achieve good chemical and ecological status of such water and reduce pollution from discharges and emissions of hazardous substances;
- protect, enhance and restore all bodies of groundwater, prevent the pollution and deterioration of groundwater, and ensure a balance between abstraction and recharge of groundwater;
- preserve protected areas.

By 2010, Member States must ensure that water pricing policies provide adequate incentives for users to use water resources efficiently and that the various economic sectors contribute to the recovery of the costs of water services including those relating to the environment and resources. This cost recovery rule is expected to impact particularly irrigated agriculture, where users have not paid the full costs of water supply.

At the latest twelve years after the date of entry into force of the Directive, the European Commission has to publish a report on the implementation of the Directive.

=== Implementation challenges ===
Some countries, such as France and Spain, had already established basin agencies before the enactment of the directive. They should thus find it easy to implement that part of the directive. Other countries that have historically managed their water resources through institutions whose geographical limits were determined by administrative boundaries, such as in the case of Germany where the states (Laender) manage water resources, are in the process of setting up co-ordinating mechanisms for each river basin. Other elements of the directive, such as the protection of groundwater and cost recovery rules, may be more difficult to implement, especially in Southern member countries that have extensive irrigated agriculture.

In March 2007 the EU commission published its first progress report on the implementation of the EU Framework Directive. The report notes mixed results. Almost all member countries have transposed the directive into national law, but the report notes that "the legal transposition of the Directive in national law is poor and in many cases inadequate". Indeed, the report finds that only in three countries the national law (Austria, Malta and Portugal) is in conformity with the Directive. Furthermore, there have been significant delays in the analysis of the characteristics of each river basin. Since the establishment of this knowledge base is a precondition for Basin Plans, this delay jeopardises progress of the implementation of the entire Directive.

== Water Supply and Sanitation ==
=== Access ===
Average connection rates to sanitation systems between 80%–90% are reported for Northern, Southern and Central Europe. Eastern Europe still copes with much lower rates of 40%–65% of the population connected to primary wastewater treatment at least. Europe in general is improving: Over the last decade more households accessed public treatment plants or even upgraded their treatment system (e.g. from secondary to tertiary treatment).

=== Service quality ===
As access is dependent on each member state so is service quality. It ranges from very good service quality in Northern and Southern States of the European Union for example in Spain or Germany to insufficient or poor services especially in Eastern European states. The history of WSS within the member states and different states in development can partly explain the heterogeneous state of the supply and treatment systems.

=== History of WSS sector ===
The supply of water and its disposal has been managed in Europe for many centuries. Centralised water supply and sanitation started with the Romans who were responsible for the construction of aqueducts and systems to collect and distribute water. During the Middle Ages water was distributed through private carriers or/and organised through local communities or cities. The Industrial Revolution and the construction of modern industrialised conurbations in Europe was dependent upon managed water supplies. The United Kingdom pioneered urban planning at that time.

The time of industrialisation and development of cities (between 1800 and 1900) in terms of WSS is called the time of simple regime followed by the regimes of lower complexity between 1900 and 1950, medium (1980–1970), high complexity (1970–1985) and the era finally ended up in an so called attempt of integration from 1985 onwards. The terms reflect the approach of most (Western) European countries towards WSS at that time. It steadily developed from privately organised co-operations to governmental influenced systems. Together with water management in general, it nowadays comes back to private initiatives manifested in Public-Private co-operations.

== Other tools and instruments ==
=== The Blueprint to Safeguard Europe's Waters ===
The Blueprint to Safeguard Europe's Waters is the EU's policy response to the challenges of the implementation of the EU Water Framework Directive. It is basically structured in four parts:

- The review of actions taken to mitigate water scarcity and droughts,
- So called Fitness-Checks identifying overlapping or redundant policy structures and recommend improvement strategies,
- The assessments of (a) river basin management plans (by Member States) and (b) vulnerability of water resources due to climate change.

=== Water Supply and Sanitation Technology Platform ===
Main text:Water Supply and Sanitation Technology Platform

One international nonprofit association (under Belgian law) supporting the European Union in dealing with the challenges of water related issues is the WssTP. This platform was built up in 2004 with financial support of the European Commission and is steadily growing ever since. The association is dealing with water supply and sanitation issues within Europe and all over the world. Nowadays, it is funded through fees paid by its 127 members from industry, research and education. The aim of the association is to support the development of the water related sector within Europe, assist both the EU and developing countries in achieving the Millennium Development Goals, and provide Research and Development roadmaps and recommendations on water related issues especially involving the European Commission.

=== Water Information System for Europe ===
The Water Information System for Europe (WISE) is a partnership of the European Commission, the Directorate-General for the Environment (European Commission), Eurostat, the Joint Research Centre and the European Environment Agency. Since 2007 this web-based service platform provides the public with information about ongoing research projects, policies, data, and reports connected to water in the EU. The target group of this online information system is researchers and professionals dealing with water related issues within the framework of the EU. The platform helps to store and administer data and output handed in by member states and agencies connected to the reporting requirements of the European Commission.

=== EAP Task Force ===
The Environmental Action Programme (EAP) is a policy adopted by Environment Ministers in 1993 in a conference in Switzerland. An international Task Force was established later on to support mainly states of countries in the Eastern Europe, Caucasus and Central Asia. In WSS they are supporting the financial strategies of a number of countries to achieve the Millennium Development Goals. Furthermore, they are working on indicators and monitoring systems in those countries to collect data of water utilities to check their performance. Apart from that, the EAP task force is figuring out the potentials of the private sector to participate in the water sector especially in water supply and sanitation in the EECCA countries and they consult local partners in financial planning and investment. They are also collaborating with the EU Water Initiative since 2005.

== Major challenges ==
Major challenges of the EU concerning WSS are connected with modern pressures to the system. Climate change, demographic developments, urbanization, economic progress, social changes influence the water sector in many ways. The European Union is said to be very effective concerning water management and policies. However, especially the new member states located in Eastern Europe are in need of enormous investments to ensure the sustainability of the water infrastructure.

The existing and foreseen problems are the lack of investments in the rural and municipal water supply which led to poor services (e.g. water leakages, interruption of service, insufficient water availability during drought, etc.), the limited availability of water resources and its energy consumption which can represent up to 50% of municipalities' electricity bill. Technologies are actually available and with a quick return on investment but the sole focus on water quality has diverted the attention for the increasing need of sustainability from the water sector in the context of climate change.

Water supply limitation counts as major concern. The first and most rational answer should be to tackle the water leakage problem Europe is facing as almost 1/4 of treated water is leaked in average in the EU. Moreover, research shows that water reuse and recycling are also solutions in the long-term. Furthermore, expert's advice say that water supply and waste water treatment systems should be decentralised. Another challenge within the water sector in Europe is privatisation and lobbyism in the water sector. In France, recent problems emerged regarding the privatising of water supply companies.

The European Union needs to make extra investments of €90 billion in the water and waste sector to meet its 2030 climate and energy goals. However, wastewater resources can be useful. In the European Union, an estimated 60–70% of wastewater's potential value is still untapped (in heat, energy, nutrients, minerals, metals, chemicals).

Although the complete eradication of micropollutants in water is not presently a legal requirement in the EU, Switzerland has previously approved a regulation (in effect since March 2014) to minimize micropollutant loads from wastewater treatment plants serving at least 2 000 people. Many Member States, including France, Germany, and the Netherlands, are contemplating adding treatments to the usual primary, secondary, and tertiary treatment procedures to reduce micropollutants in treated wastewater. These further water treatments are referred to as the "fourth step or quaternary therapy" combined.

== Wastewater reuse ==
According to an EU-funded study, "Europe and the Mediterranean countries are lagging behind" California, Japan, and Australia "in the extent to which reuse is being taken up." According to the study "the concept (of reuse) is difficult for the regulators and wider public to understand and accept."

The second largest waste reclamation program in the world is in Spain, where 12% of the nation's waste is treated. By 2023, a new EU agriculture law may raise water reuse by six times, from 1.7 billion m3 to 6.6 billion m3, and cut water stress by 5%.

The indirect potable reuse (IDP) project in Wulpen, Belgium, discharges recycled water to an unconfined dune aquifer. Initially the recycled water comprised 90% RO permeate and 10% MF permeate (approx. 6,000,000 m^{3} per year). However, it was observed that some herbicides were present in the recycled water at levels below drinking water standards due to detection of herbicides in the MF permeate. As a result, since May 2004, only the RO permeate after UV disinfection is injected into the aquifer with addition of sodium hydroxide to adjust the pH.

== See also ==
- Drinking water quality standards
- List of water supply and sanitation by country
- Sustainable Development Goal 6
- Water, energy and food security nexus

=== Water supply and sanitation by Member States ===
- Public water supply and sanitation in Germany
- Water supply and sanitation in France
- Water supply and sanitation in Portugal
- Water supply and sanitation in Spain
- Water supply and sanitation in the United Kingdom
- Water privatisation in England and Wales
- Water supply and sanitation in the Netherlands
