= Water supply and sanitation in the Netherlands =

Water supply and sanitation in The Netherlands
Data
- Water coverage (broad definition): 100%
- Sanitation coverage (broad definition): 100%
- Continuity of supply: Continuous
- Average water use (L/person/day): 129 (2021)
- Average urban water and sanitation tariff (US$/m^{3}): €1.49/m^{3} (2008), incl. tap water tax and VAT, but without sanitation
- Share of household metering: 96% (2008)
- Non-revenue water: 6% (2006)

Institutions
- Decentralization to municipalities: Only for sewerage
- National water and sanitation company: None
- Water and sanitation regulator: None
- Responsibility for policy setting: Ministry of Housing, Spatial Planning and Environment
- Sector law: Yes (for water supply only)
- Service providers: 10 water companies (water supply); 431 municipalities (sewerage); 27 water boards (wastewater treatment)

Water supply and sanitation in the Netherlands is provided in good quality and at a reasonable price to the entire population. Water consumption is one of the lowest in developed countries at 129 litres per capita per day and water leakage in the distribution network is one of the lowest in the world at only 6%.

A large array of institutions is responsible for providing water and sanitation services: 10 regional water companies provide drinking water, 352 municipalities are in charge of sewers, and 21 water boards treat wastewater. Two Ministries share responsibility for policy-making in the sector. A large number of knowledge institutes, NGOs and two business associations – VEWIN representing the interests of the water companies and UVW representing the water boards - complete the institutional landscape of the sector.

An interesting feature of the Dutch water sector is a performance benchmarking system for water companies first introduced in 1997, which has inspired similar efforts in other European countries. The Dutch parliament passed a law in 2004 banning private sector provision of water supply. However, while the water companies themselves remain publicly owned, they contract many services - such as customer service and repairs - out to the private sector.

== Access and service quality ==
The Dutch have universal access to the water supply and sanitation at very good quality. The drinking water network is in such good shape that treated water typically does not need to be chlorinated to prevent recontamination in the network, so that water reaches the consumer without a taste or smell of chlorine.

== Water resources and water use ==
60% of Dutch drinking water comes from groundwater, mainly in the eastern part of the Netherlands. The remaining 40% comes from surface water, mainly in the West where water utilities pump from the Rhine and the Meuse because groundwater is brackish. The government encourages the use of surface water by charging a groundwater abstraction levy. Average municipal water use is among the lowest in developed countries at only 129 litres/person/day in 2021. 96% of water users are metered and a portion of their bill - typically about one half - is based on actual consumption.

== Infrastructure and Human Resources ==
Infrastructure. There are 116,000 km of water pipes in the Netherlands.

Human Resources. The ten regional water companies had 4,938 full-time equivalent employees in 2008. This figures does not include private sector employees working for companies to which the water companies contract out services. They also do not include employees of municipalities working on sewerage. About 11,000 people work at water boards, an unknown share of which operate and maintain wastewater treatment plants.

== History and recent events ==
Consolidation of water companies. In 1945 the Dutch water sector was highly fragmented with more than 200 water companies. Their number gradually declined to 10 five decades later. One reason was a transition from groundwater to surface water, and the need to construct capital-intensive and relatively complex treatment plants which required the cooperation of many municipalities. Another reason was that the national government encouraged the creation of larger public limited companies through a law enacted in 1975. However, since the 1990s consolidation has not been driven by the government, but rather by a desire of water companies themselves to reach economies of scale and to be "competitive" in a more liberalized European market.

Benchmarking. Since 1997 the Dutch water companies have engaged in a voluntary exercise to benchmark their performance against each other, in order to improve their efficiency and increase transparency. Initially, the benchmarking was undertaken to forestall a government proposal by the Ministry of Economic Affairs to establish a regulatory agency following the British model. Later on, when the regulatory agency did not materialize, benchmarking was pursued more and more for its intrinsic benefits. The Dutch benchmarking exercise covers four areas: water quality; service; environment; and finance and efficiency. The Dutch benchmarking program was the first nationwide benchmarking exercise in the water supply sector in continental Europe. Since then it has inspired similar water and sanitation benchmarking exercises in other European countries, including Denmark, Finland, Norway, Sweden and Germany. Most of these exercises are coordinated since 2004 in the North European Benchmarking Co-operation.

Ban of private companies from providing drinking water. In 2004 the Netherlands passed a law which prevents any privately owned company from providing drinking water services to the public. The law is a follow-up to a 1997 government paper, which made clear that water supply concessions would only be given to government-owned companies. It had been introduced in 2000 by the Dutch Environment Minister at the time (1998–2002), Jan Pronk. The bill only covers drinking water provision to households, not sewerage and wastewater treatment. Since almost all water companies in the Netherlands are public and they contract out many services to the private sector, which the law allows, the law has not had any practical consequences.

== Responsibility for water supply and sanitation ==
Responsibilities in the Dutch drinking water and sanitation sector are spread over a number of institutions at different levels of regional aggregation and with specific functions. At the national level two Ministries share responsibility for the sector, and there is no autonomous regulatory agency as it is the case in England, states of the US or Portugal. At the regional level there are 10 water companies in charge of drinking water supply and 27 water boards, which are in charge of wastewater treatment, among other tasks. At the local level, municipalities are in charge of sewerage. Knowledge institutions and NGOs play an active role in the sector. While the sector may appear institutionally fragmented, cooperation between the various stakeholders is usually strong, minimizing frictions and conflicts.

=== Policy and regulation ===
The legal framework of the Dutch water sector consists of the Water Supply Act of 2005 and a corresponding Decree on Water Supply, as well as the Water Boards Act of 1995.

Within the government two Ministries share responsibility for the sector. The Ministry of Housing, Spatial Planning and the Environment (called VROM, using its Dutch acronym) is in charge of water supply and regulates public health. The Ministry of Transport, Public Works and Water Management is in charge of water resources management. Its Directorate-General for Public Works and Water Management (Rijkswaterstaat) is in charge of water resources policy and managing surface water, such as the IJsselmeer, and the rivers Rhine and Maas, in cooperation with the Water Boards (see below). The Ministry's Inspectorate for Transport, Public Works and Water Management is in charge of monitoring compliance with regulations.

The 12 provinces of the Netherlands are responsible for groundwater management, for example through licenses for groundwater extraction. They usually delegate their water-related functions to the Water Boards (see below).

=== Service provision ===
Public regional water companies. Ten Dutch water companies are responsible for drinking water supply in the Netherlands. The Association of Dutch Water Companies (Vewin) represents them. Many of their services, such as customer relations and repairs, are contracted out to the private sector. Their 6-year joint research programme is contracted to KWR (see 'Knowledge institutes' below).

Private sector. The small private company NV Bronwaterleiding Doorn provides drinking water to the municipality of Doorn and a neighboring municipality. As per the provision of the law banning private sector participation in the provision of water services, the company is slated to be taken over by the much larger regional public water company VITENS which operates in the surrounding area.

Municipalities. 431 municipalities are responsible for collecting wastewater via the sewer system.

Water Boards. The 24 water boards (Waterschappen) are key institutions in charge of water resources management in the Netherlands. They are decentralised public authorities with their own legal personality and financial resources. Water boards are based on the Dutch Constitution. Their responsibilities are outlined in the Water Boards Act of 1995. Water boards are responsible for flood control, management of regional water resources (quantity and quality) and treatment of urban wastewater. The oldest water boards date from the 13th century, making them the oldest democratic structure in the Netherlands. The umbrella organisation of the water boards is the Association of Dutch Water Boards (Unie van Waterschappen). Many water boards contract out services to the private sector, such as through DBFO (Design, Build, Finance, Operate) contracts for wastewater treatment plants involving private operation for a period of 30 years.

Waternet In the case of Amsterdam, the local water supply company and the local Water Board DWR merged in January 2006 to form Waternet, thus forming the first integrated water and sanitation company in the Netherlands.

=== Knowledge institutes ===
Watercycle Research Institute is the coordinator and principal implementor of the joint research programme for the Dutch water companies, De Watergroep from Belgium, and Vewin. Nowhere else in the world do water companies work so closely with each other and their knowledge institute. KWR stems from Kiwa, established in 1948. In 2006, Kiwa Water Research became an independent entity, with the Dutch water companies (and in 2016 De Watergroep in Belgium) as its shareholders. In 2008 it changed its name into KWR Watercycle Research Institute.

According to the Netherlands Water Information Network, the Netherlands has "developed a coherent knowledge infrastructure in the water sector, comprising government and private research centres, technological and educational institutes (such as Alterra, UNESCO-IHE, ITC, Deltares) and several universities". These institutes carry out a broad range of basic and applied research, from hydraulic engineering to integrated water management. The institutes have formed close connections with internationally oriented private sector companies. The institutes "have built up considerable networks and experience in water-related issues at international level". Lessons learned abroad have also been successfully applied in the Netherlands. For example, the results of research into the natural processes of undisturbed water systems (which are now rare in the Netherlands), are used as points of reference for the ecological restoration of water systems.

=== Non-governmental organizations ===
Still according to the Netherlands Water Information Network, many Dutch non-governmental organizations (NGOs) engaged in the water sector "have a solid institutional and financial base, as well as an international focus". They participate in UN organizations, sessions of the Global Biodiversity Forum (with inputs from the World Conservation Union, IUCN), the Ramsar Bureau and Convention, and the World Water Forum. The international NGOs Wetland International and Bird Life International are based in Wageningen. Their presence has "not only helped to improve the interactions between Dutch ministries, knowledge institutes and NGOs, but has also strengthened the effectiveness and scope of Dutch protection strategies".

== Efficiency ==
Using established indicators for the technical operational efficiency of water utilities, the Dutch water companies are highly efficient. For example, according to the association of Dutch water utilities, leakage losses are below 6%. According to the same source, the number of employees per 1,000 connections (water only, without sanitation) is less than 1. Both these figures are among the lowest in the world.

== Financial aspects ==
Tariffs. According to the consulting firm NUS the average water tariff for the five largest cities in the Netherlands in 2007 for a monthly consumption of 10m^{3} was slightly higher than the national average indicated by VEWA, at €1.77/m^{3}. The average sanitation tariff was €2.09/m^{3}. The total water and sanitation tariff of €3.87/m^{3}. According to the study, it is the third-highest tariff among 11 European countries included in the study after Germany and Denmark.

According to VEWIN, the association of water companies, the average water tariff for all cities in the Netherlands in 2008 was slightly lower at €1.49/m^{3} but without sanitation. This includes €0.20/m^{3} of tap water tax and VAT, provincial groundwater levies, distribution and concession reimbursements. Tariffs vary between €1.17 and €2.01 per m^{3}. The tariff structure is binomial with a fixed portion and a variable portion. Tariffs can vary within the service area of a water company, depending on local costs. The International Water Association estimated that the average residential water bill in the Netherlands for a consumption of 200 m^{3} per year in 2007 was €250.00.

Water board finances and wastewater treatment levy. Water boards have the authority to levy taxes and finance their activities mostly with revenues from these taxes. The three main taxes levied by the water boards are a charge for flood protection, a water resources management charge, and a water pollution levy for wastewater treatment. The pollution levy is based on the principle that a polluter must pay for the pollution that he causes. Every household in the Netherlands pays the pollution levy. Companies and organizations pay a rate linked to the quantity and composition of their waste water. The revenues from these taxes provide a budget of €1.9 billion in 2004. The total costs in the same year are estimated at €2.3 billion, including a share for wastewater treatment. On average around 95% of all annual investment costs and management and maintenance costs by the Water Boards are covered by their revenues.

Investment. €323m was invested in water supply in 2008. There is no information on investments in sanitation, making international comparisons difficult.

== See also ==
EU water policy
