= Águas de Portugal =

- Company type: State-owned
- Industry: Water supply; Wastewater sanitation
- Founded: 1993
- Headquarters: Portugal
- Area served: Portugal
- Website: www.adp.pt

Águas de Portugal (AdP Group) is a Portuguese state-owned company that operates in the water sector.

AdP Group companies provide services throughout all of mainland Portugal and across the fields of water supply and wastewater sanitation, namely the capture, treatment and distribution of water for public consumption and the collection, transport, treatment and disposal of urban and industrial wastewater, including their recycling and reuse.

AdP Group also operates in several Portuguese speaking countries.

== See also ==
- Water supply and sanitation in Portugal
