= Sodenbrunnen =

A sodenbrunnen is a sod cistern used in the saltwater marshlands of Northern Germany from the early first millennium AD to the Middle Ages to collect rain water for drinking.
