= EECCA =

International relations between Eastern Europe and Central Asia

According to the Organisation for Economic Co-operation and Development, Eastern Europe, Caucasus and Central Asia (EECCA) is a block of countries that includes Armenia, Azerbaijan, Belarus, Georgia, Kazakhstan, Kyrgyzstan, Moldova, Russian Federation, Tajikistan, Turkmenistan, Ukraine and Uzbekistan.
