= Volumetric pricing =

Pricing strategy

Volumetric pricing is a pricing strategy frequently used by the public utilities (e.g., water and power tariffs) where the fixed costs of the service are recovered proportionally to the amount of use. For example, under this approach a per-kWh pricing of an electric utility includes a small share of the monthly fixed cost of the utility, fixed (say, monthly) charges for the service are either absent of inconsequential.

The volumetric pricing, in addition to the easy-to-understand structure, encourages the customers to lower the use of the resource. For example, if the (very significant) fixed costs of the electricity service were recovered through the monthly fixed payments, then the per-unit price would have been much lower thus encouraging additional consumption.

Conversely, the volumetric price disincentivizes the utility from investing in conservation: if the customers will use less of the resources, the utility sales will shrink, reducing the fixed-cost portion and causing the lost revenues and under-investment. Therefore this pricing strategy is typically coupled at the regulatory level with an annual rate adjustment mechanism (also known as revenue-decoupling policy).

Volumetric pricing requires metering that can be expensive to implement, especially in the case of irrigation, alternatives include:

- flat rate;
- per-area pricing, coupled with tiered pricing;
- a system of water rights or quotas;
- input pricing as a percentage of the cost of certain input(s), e.g., seed;
- output pricing as a percentage of product sales.

For the electricity services, the number of alternatives is larger, Borenstein provides a review of the ways that can be used by the electric utilities to recover the fixed costs.

== See also ==
- Dimensional weight (also called volumetric weight)

== Sources ==
- Prindle, Bill; Zarnikau, Jay; Allis, Erica (2010). "Barriers and Policy Solutions to Energy Efficiency as a Carbon Emissions Reduction Strategy". Generating Electricity in a Carbon-Constrained World. Elsevier. pp. 207–239. doi:10.1016/B978-1-85617-655-2.00008-0. ISBN 978-1-85617-655-2.
- Borenstein, Severin (September 2016). "The economics of fixed cost recovery by utilities" (PDF). The Electricity Journal. 29 (7): 5–12. Bibcode:2016ElecJ..29g...5B. doi:10.1016/j.tej.2016.07.013. ISSN 1040-6190.
