= Water supply and sanitation in Portugal =

Data
- Water coverage (broad definition): 99%
- Sanitation coverage (broad definition): 99%
- Continuity of supply: High
- Average urban water and sanitation tariff (US$/m^{3}): About 0.90 euro/m^3

Institutions
- Decentralization to municipalities: Partial
- National water and sanitation company: AdP
- Water and sanitation regulator: ERSAR
- Responsibility for policy setting: Ministry of Environment
- Sector law: None

Water supply and sanitation services in Portugal have seen important advances in access to services, technologies used and service quality over the past decades (1980s–1990s), partially achieved thanks to important funds from the European Union. Nevertheless, sanitation still remains relatively low in mountain rural areas and some people have their own sources of water controlled by municipalities.

During the 1990s Portugal has put in place a modern institutional framework for the sector, which includes a national regulatory agency (ERSAR – The Water and Waste Services Regulation Authority) and multi-municipal water and sanitation companies.

== Access ==
In Portugal 93% of households have access to drinking water through house connections (97% in urban areas, but only 50% in rural areas) 76% of households have access to sewer connections.

== Service quality ==
=== Drinking water ===
Water supply is continuous, except during droughts.

Drinking water quality is not consistently good, especially in smaller systems. Portugal does not comply with a series of drinking water parameters (iron, manganese, total coliforms, faecal coliforms, faecal streptococci and clostridium) laid down in the EU drinking water directive. For example, almost 50% of water supply zones do not comply as regards total coliforms, while 20% of the zones do not comply with the faecal coliforms parameter.

=== Wastewater ===
Portugal does not yet fully comply with EU regulations on wastewater discharges. Even where wastewater treatment plants exist they do not always function properly. Especially in cities with combined sewers, treatment plants do not function properly after heavy rains. Sewer overflows during heavy rains are frequent, partly due to unauthorized storm water drain connections to the sewer system.

For example, in Lisbon, the waste water treatment plant of Alcântara was not operational in 2007; then refurbished in 2011. In Matosinhos in the region of Porto, only primary (basic) treatment is in place. In Costa de Aveiro (Aveiro), 60% of the polluting load generated is not collected and 65% is not treated. In Póvoa de Varzim/Vila do Conde, 60% of the load is not collected and the level of treatment in place is unknown.

At some beaches, bathing is restricted because of pollution.

== Responsibility for water supply and sanitation ==
=== Policy and regulation ===
The Ministry of Environment and Regional Development is in charge of sector policies. As in many other countries, water and sanitation is not a political priority. Political actions at the local level are often oriented at the short-term, following electoral cycles, with limited long-term planning. Nevertheless, there has been remarkable stability of the national policy framework independent of electoral cycles.

In 1997 Portugal created a national regulatory agency, which is now called the Water and Waste Services Regulation Authority Entidade Reguladora dos Serviços de Águas e Resíduos (ERSAR). ERSAR is in charge of water supply, wastewater and solid waste management. Its attributions include the economic regulation of service providers, as well as the regulation of their service quality, including water quality. The regulatory agency is directed by a three-member Board, whose members are appointed upon the recommendation of the Minister of Environment.

Water resources management is the responsibility of the Water Institute INAG, created in 1993 under the Ministry of Environment and Regional Development. INAG operates, among others, on the basis of the 2005 Water Law, which transposes the EU water framework directive into national law. Portugal has drawn up a National Water Plan and 15 River Basin Plans.

=== Service provision ===
Provision of water and sanitation services in Portugal is a shared responsibility between the 308 municipalities and the national, public holding company Águas de Portugal (AdP) and its subsidiaries. About 73% of the population in 243 municipalities receives water directly from municipalities (3.5 million people) or single-municipality companies established under public law (2.5 million people). 27% of the population receives water directly from companies established under private law, including 1.7 million from multi-municipal companies majority-owned by Águas de Portugal and 0.9 million from other municipal companies established under private law. Many municipalities do not control their sources of bulk water supply. Companies established under private law, in particular multi-municipal companies co-owned by Águas de Portugal, thus sell water to municipalities, providing water indirectly in bulk to 53% of the population. In addition, as mentioned above, companies established under private law provide water directly to 27% of the population. Thus, a total of about 80% of the population receives water directly or indirectly multi-municipal companies established under private law.

Independently of whether utilities are established under public or private law, all infrastructure is publicly owned. There is only limited private sector participation in the provision of water and sanitation services. Storm water drainage is directly provided by the municipalities.

==== Municipalities ====
According to the local government law (Lei das autarquias locais) the country's 308 municipalities are responsible for providing water supply and sanitation services, either directly or indirectly through concessions. Decree-law 379/93 of 1993 establishes the legal basis for concessions to municipal and multi-municipal water and sanitation companies established under private law (typically publicly owned shareholder companies that are part of AdP). As mentioned above, these have come into widespread use in Portugal ever since.

==== Águas de Portugal ====
With total assets amounting to around €7.5 billion, the AdP Group is the largest entity operating in the environmental sector in Portugal. The AdP Group was founded in 1993 and set the mission of developing multi-municipal water supply and wastewater sanitation systems and currently providing services to over 80% of the Portuguese population. The core activity involves the integrated management of the urban water cycle and spanning all of its respective phases, ranging from the capture, treatment and distribution of water for public consumption to the collection, transport, treatment and disposal of urban and industrial wastewaters and including their recycling and reutilisation. Through its different companies, the group has a nationwide presence, providing services to municipalities that simultaneously serve as shareholders in the companies managing multi-municipal systems ("upstream" systems), and directly serving the populations through municipal systems ("downstream" systems) providing water and sanitation systems.

In recent years, in association with local partners as well as other Portuguese companies in this sector, the group has undertaken a diverse range of projects in countries including Angola, Algeria, Brazil, Cape Verde, East Timor, Morocco, Mozambique and Sao Tome e Principe, whether in the format of technical assistance or the management of water and wastewater concessionary services. Currently, the group is present in Angola, where it set up a subsidiary in 2010; in Mozambique through its stake in Aquatec; and in various other countries following the signing of service provision and technical assistance contracts.

Map of service areas of water and sewer companies

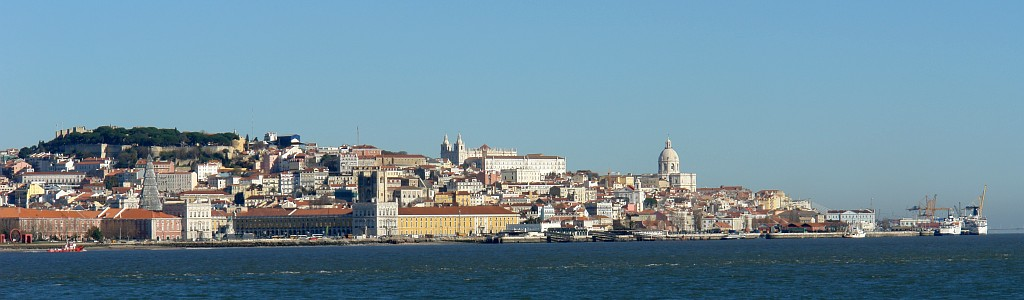
The capital of Portugal, Lisbon, receives its drinking water from Empresa Portuguesa das Águas Livres, SA (EPAL), a subsidiary of Águas de Portugal

EPAL – the water company serving Lisbon

Empresa Portuguesa das Águas Livres, SA (EPAL) is a special case. The water company serving Lisbon and surrounding municipalities is a fully owned subsidiary of Águas de Portugal, in charge of bulk water supply and of water distribution. EPAL is the company responsible for the delivery of water to households in the capital (Lisboa) where it has around 350,000 clients. In terms of its bulk operations, EPAL supplies water to 35 municipalities on the north bank of the river Tagus and, since 2015, delegated management responsibility for the multi-municipal water supply and sanitation systems of Lisbon and the Tagus Valley, which integrates 86 municipalities and a population of around 3.8 million inhabitants in a territorial area making up 33% of mainland Portugal.

== History ==
=== History since the 1970s ===
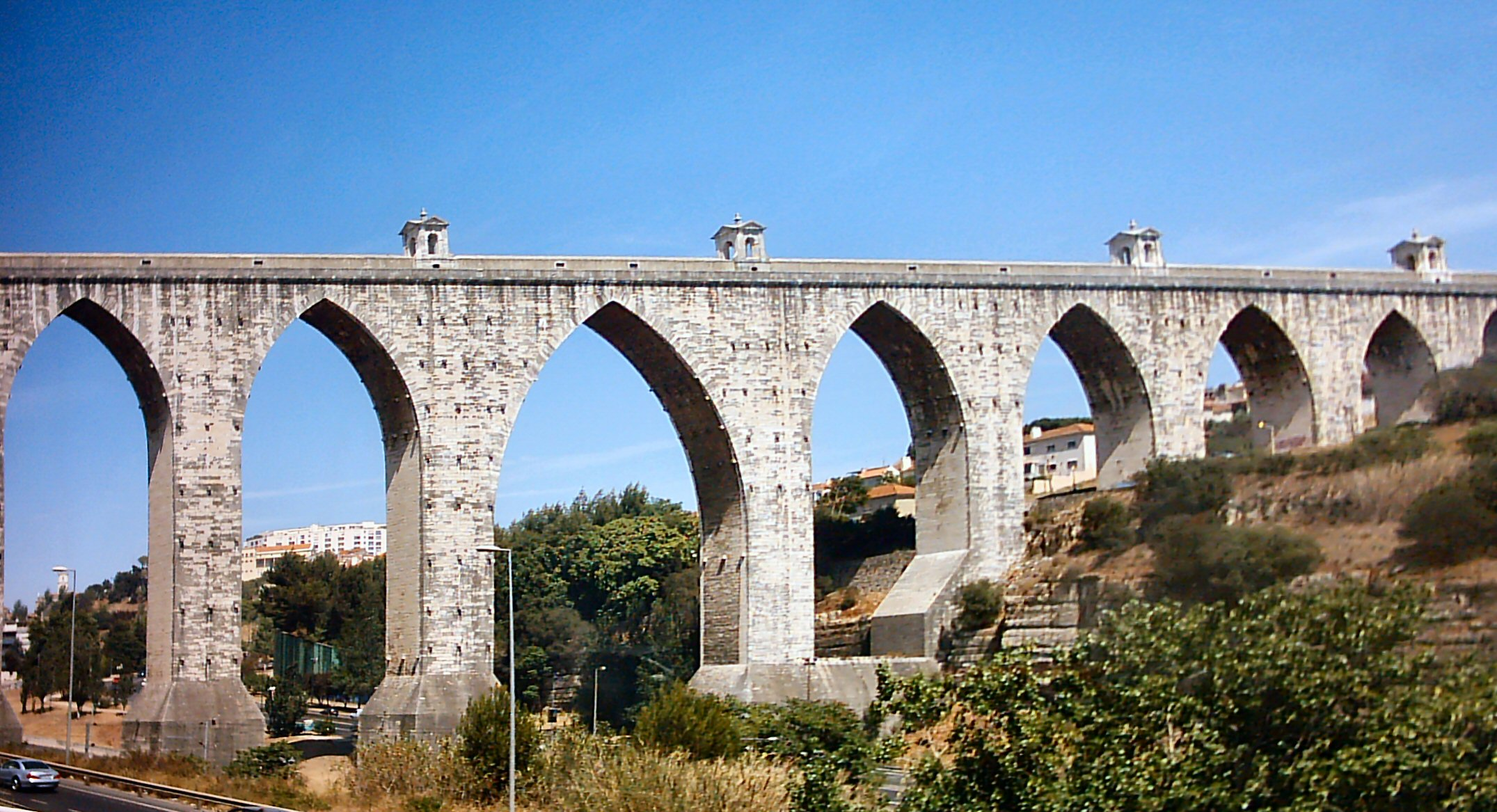
The Águas Livres Aqueduct supplied water to Lisbon until it was decommissioned in 1968

When Portugal emerged from years of dictatorship and the Carnation Revolution's turmoil in 1974, the level of access to services, the technologies used and the service quality were far from optimal. In particular, most municipal wastewater was discharged without any treatment at that time. However, substantial improvements have been achieved since then, in particular after Portugal's adhesion to the European Community (now the European Union) in 1986 which was accompanied by the gradual introduction of EU standards and financing by the European Investment Bank, the introduction of multi-municipal utilities and the holding company Águas de Portugal in 1993, and the creation of a regulatory agency for the sector in 2000.

Portugal's membership of the European Community in 1986 and the EU Urban waste water framework directive of 1991 triggered a series of reforms undertaken by the government of then Prime Minister Aníbal Cavaco Silva in order to modernize the sector, to improve service quality and to effectively use EU funds destined to the sector. Until then service provision had been the sole responsibility of the municipalities, with the exception of the metropolitan area of Lisbon which was served by the multi-municipal company called Empresa Portuguesa das Águas Livres (EPAL). Many municipalities were small and did not have the financial or human resources to modernize their water and sanitation services. Furthermore, the need to buy water from sources located in other municipalities and to lower costs by constructing wastewater treatment plants serving several municipalities, provided incentives for municipalities to cooperate.

Therefore, in 1993, the government introduced a policy to actively promote multi-municipal companies through Decree-law 379/93. The main vehicle to advance the reform process was the public Holding Company Águas de Portugal created in the same year, which was to be the majority owner of the newly created multi-municipal companies along with the participating municipalities. The government provided preferential access to EU structural funds to those municipalities that agreed to participate in the new multi-municipal companies, which were gradually created beginning in 1995. There was a strong continuity of sector policies, despite a change in government from the Social Democratic Party to the Socialist Party of Prime Minister António Guterres after the elections of 1995.

In 2000 the government published the first strategic plan for water and sanitation, further promoting the modernization of the sector and the consolidation of service provision. In the same year the regulatory agency IRAR began its work. Solid waste management was included in the purview of both AdP and IRAR, which was later renamed into ERSAR. Sector policies continued to be stable after subsequent changes of government in the elections of 2002 won by the Social Democrats and of 2005 won by the Socialists. A judgment by the European Court of Justice (ECJ) of 29 September 2005 found against Portugal for not complying with a series of drinking water parameters laid down in the EU drinking water directive. In 2007 the government published its second strategic plan for water and sanitation.

=== Developments since 2007 ===
In March 2007 the European Commission launched infringement procedures against Portugal for not complying with three Court judgements on the quality of drinking water. It also referred Portugal to the European Court of Justice over its failure to implement the EU wastewater framework directive.

Environment Commissioner Stavros Dimas said: "It is important that Portugal comply with these Court judgements, since they have a direct bearing on public health and the conservation of important natural areas. The Commission has no choice but to continue with legal action if we are to achieve the level of environmental protection intended in our legislation."

In 29 of the urban areas concerned by the directive, required collection and/or treatment systems are still not in place. For instance in Lisbon, the waste water treatment plant of Alcântara is not operational. In Matosinhos in the region of Porto, only primary (basic) treatment is in place. In Costa de Aveiro, 60% of the polluting load generated is not collected and 65% is not treated. In Póvoa de Varzim /Vila do Conde, 60% of the load was not collected and the level of treatment in place was unknown. In August 2010, a tertiary treatment plant started operating.

Concerning drinking water, Portugal still does not comply with some of the parameters of the EU directive. For example, almost 50% of water supply zones do not comply as regards total coliforms, while 20% of the zones do not comply with the faecal coliforms parameter. The situation improved in 2004, the most recent year for which Portugal provided data.

== Tariffs and cost recovery ==
For regional companies water tariffs vary between 0.31 and 0.55 euro per cubic metre and sewer tariffs vary between 0.33 and 0.54 euro per cubic metre. While in water supply systems cost recovery levels are satisfactory, the situation regarding sanitation is clearly unsustainable. The coastal urban regions show greater cost recovery ratios than the inland regions, especially regarding the Northeast region where the costs are higher and revenues are lower. A decree defining the water and sanitation tariff policy is being finalized in 2007. The decree determines the basic rules for tariff setting and aims at achieving full cost recovery, in line with the EU Water Framework Directive.

In 2010 the government was planning to set up a national tariff equilibrium fund to cross-subsidize utilities in the poorer inland regions with revenues from the wealthier coastal regions. The regulator ERSAR says that it is not aware of a similar mechanism anywhere else in the world.

There have been protests against tariff increases under private concessions. For example, residents of Paços de Ferreira, a municipality in northern Portugal, say that after the private company AGS took over their water system the price of water has gone up by around 6% every year.

== Investment and finance ==
Many water systems in Portugal are quite old, so that there is a substantial requirement for infrastructure rehabilitation. From 2000 to 2006 investment needs in the sector were estimated at 4.23 billion euro, including 2.37 billion euro in bulk water supply and wastewater treatment (vertem "baixa"). Actual investments were in the same order of magnitude, but with a very different breakdown than expected: 3.4 billion euro, or 77% more than expected, had to be invested in bulk supply and wastewater treatment, mainly because cost estimates had been too low and because environmental standards had been tightened. Concerning investments in water distribution and sewers (vertem "alta"), they were only 0.9 billion euro and thus much lower than expected. Many of these investments had to be postponed because of lack of funding.

AdP by itself invested 588 million euro in 2006 alone. Grants from the European Regional Development Fund funded about 1.7 billion euro, or 40% of total investments in 2000–2006. Loans from the European Investment Bank (EIB) to Águas de Portugal and self-generated capital of the utilities funded the remainder of the investments. In October 2006 the EIB approved a 925 million euro loan for investments in eleven regional water and sanitation utilities in Portugal.

Since 2000 two mid-term national investment plans for the sector, PEAASAR I 2000–2006 and PEAASAR II 2007–2013, have been approved. Such national sector investment plans are an interesting feature that is specific to Portugal and are not common in other EU countries.

== See also ==
- EU water policy
- Water privatisation in England and Wales
