= Outline of Cambodia =

Country in Southeast Asia

The Flag of Cambodia

The Royal arms of Cambodia

The location of Cambodia

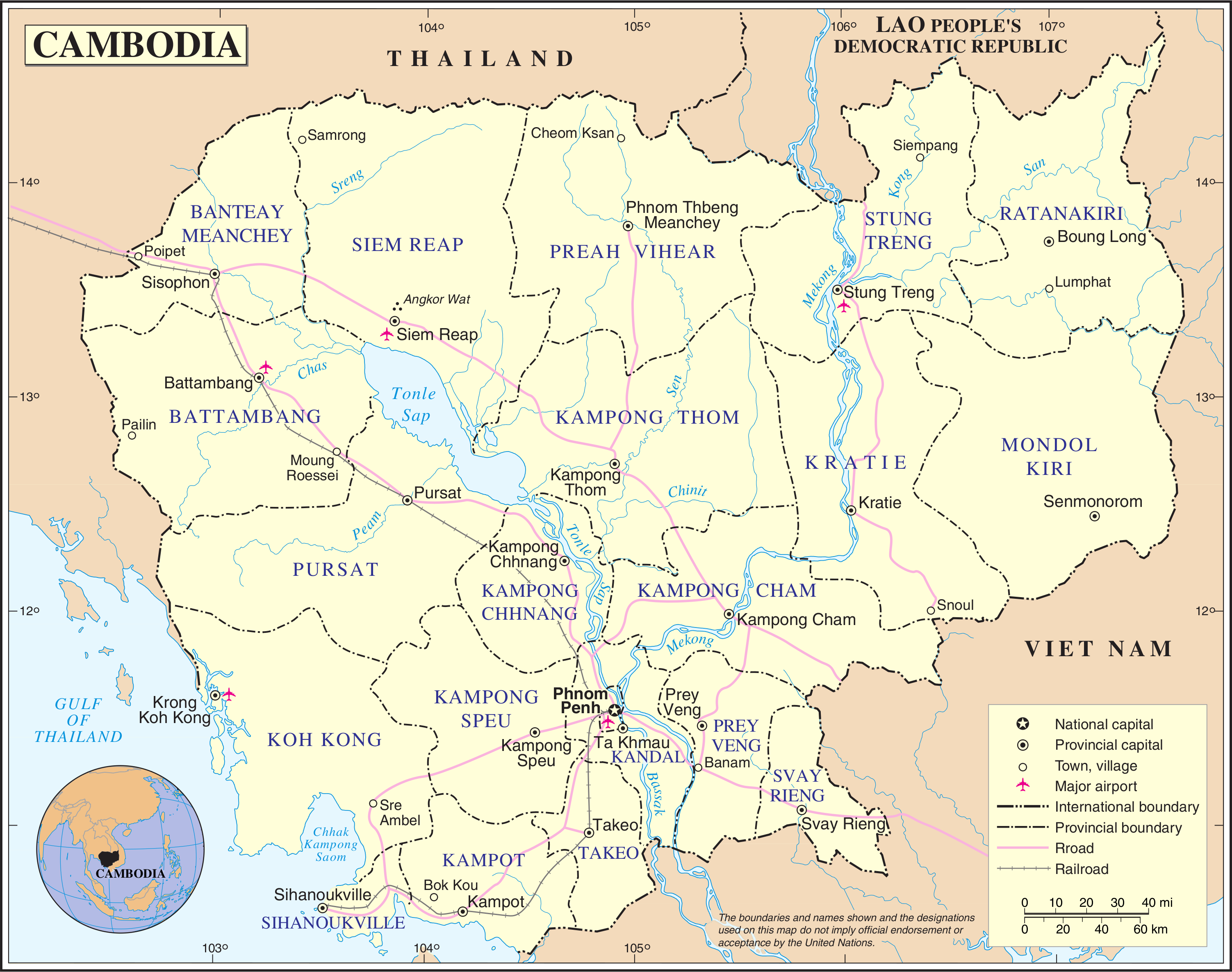
An enlargeable map of Cambodia

The following outline is provided as an overview of and topical guide to Cambodia:

Cambodia – a sovereign country located in Southeast Asia with a population of over 13 million people. It is the successor state of the once powerful Hindu and Buddhist Khmer Empire, which ruled most of the Indochinese Peninsula between the eleventh and fourteenth centuries. Cambodia's main industries are garments, tourism, and construction. In 2007, foreign visitors to Angkor Wat alone almost hit the 4 million mark.

== General reference ==
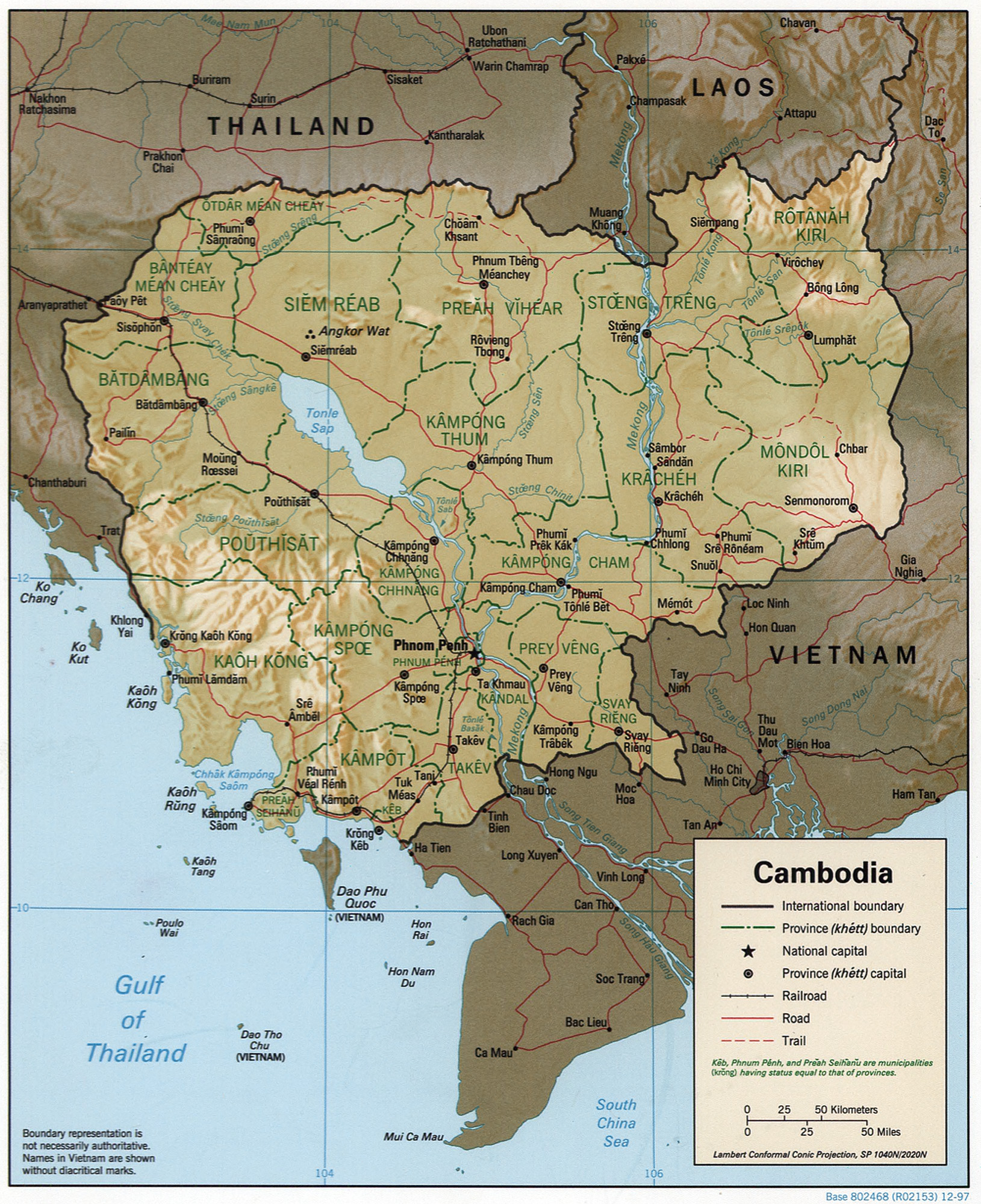
An enlargeable relief map of Cambodia

- Pronunciation: /kæmˈboʊdiə/
- Common English country name: Cambodia
- Official English country name: Kingdom of Cambodia
- Common endonym(s): Kampuchea
  - Pronunciation: /ˌkæmpʊˈtʃiːə/; កម្ពុជា, Kămpŭchéa [ˈkampuciə]
- Official endonym(s): Kampuchea
- Adjectival(s): Cambodian
- Demonym(s): Cambodian
- Etymology: Name of Cambodia
- ISO country codes: KH, KHM, 116
- ISO region codes: See ISO 3166-2:KH
- Internet country code top-level domain: .kh

== Geography of Cambodia ==
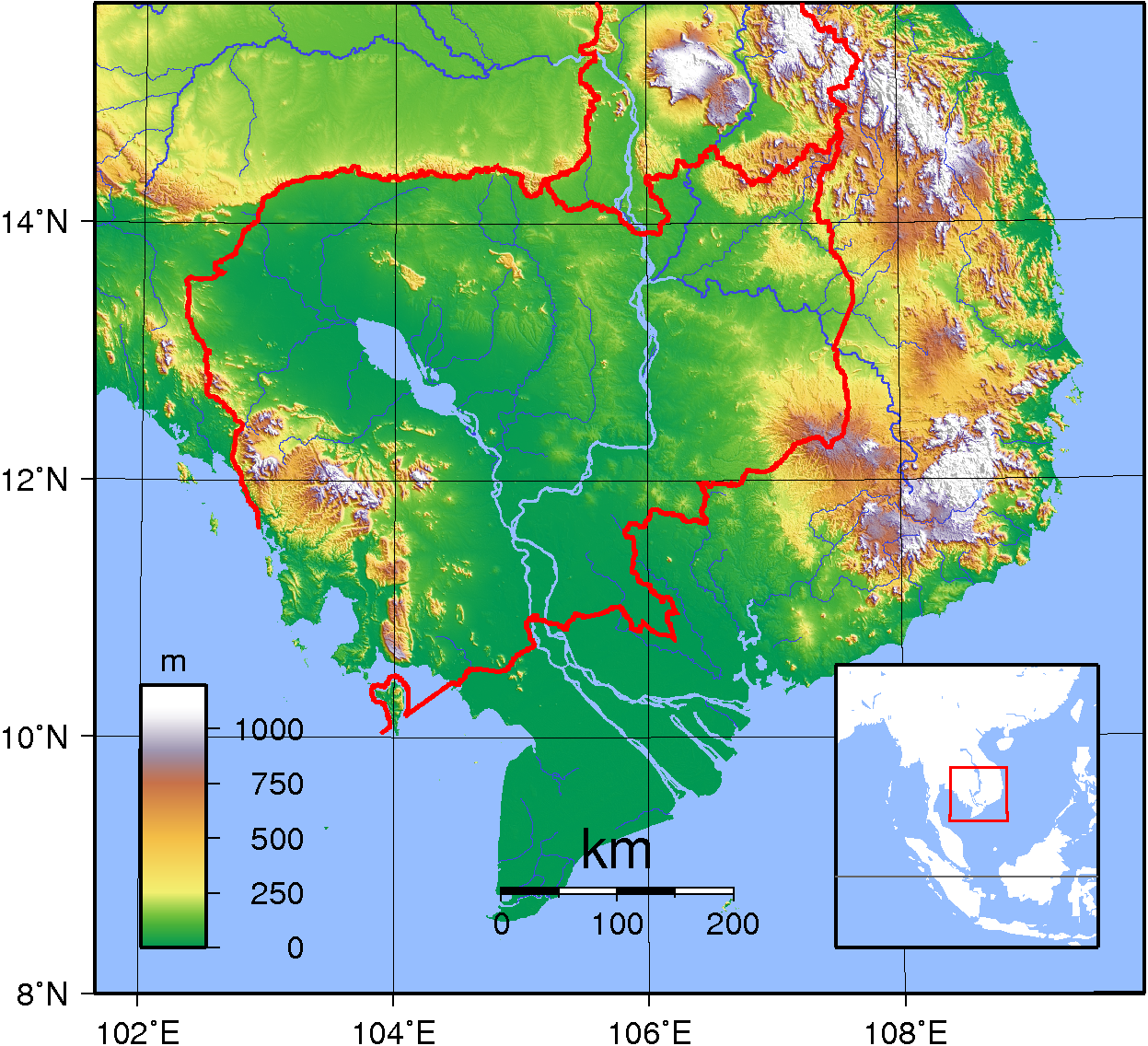
An enlargeable topographic map of Cambodia

Geography of Cambodia

- Cambodia is: a country
- Location:
  - Northern Hemisphere and Eastern Hemisphere
  - Eurasia
    - Asia
      - South East Asia
        - Indochina
  - Time zone: UTC+07
  - Extreme points of Cambodia
    - High: Phnom Aural 1,810 m (5,938 ft)
    - Low: Gulf of Thailand 0 m
  - Land boundaries: 2,572 km

Vietnam 1,228 km
Thailand 803 km
Laos 541 km

- Coastline: 443 km

- Population of Cambodia: 15,552,211 - 73rd most populous country
- Area of Cambodia: 181,035 square kilometres (69,898 sq mi) - 88th largest country
- Atlas of Cambodia

=== Environment of Cambodia ===
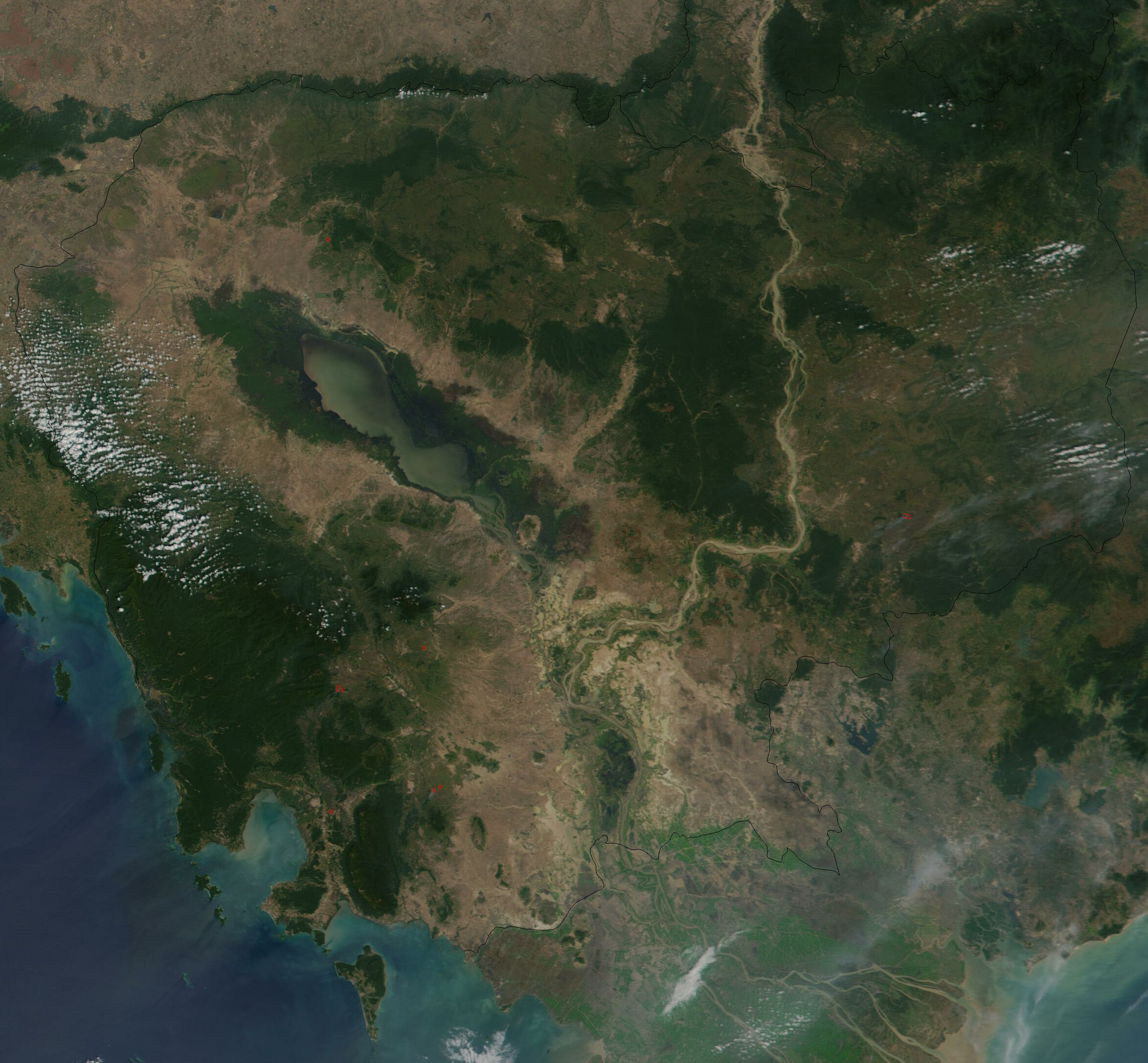
An enlargeable satellite image of Cambodia

- Climate of Cambodia
- Protected areas of Cambodia
- Wildlife of Cambodia
  - Fauna of Cambodia
    - Birds of Cambodia
    - Mammals of Cambodia

==== Natural geographic features of Cambodia ====
- Islands of Cambodia
- Lakes of Cambodia
- Mountains of Cambodia
  - Volcanoes in Cambodia
- Rivers of Cambodia
- List of World Heritage Sites in Cambodia

=== Regions of Cambodia ===
Regions of Cambodia

==== Ecoregions of Cambodia ====
List of ecoregions in Cambodia

==== Administrative divisions of Cambodia ====
Administrative divisions of Cambodia

- Provinces of Cambodia
  - Districts of Cambodia

===== Provinces of Cambodia =====
Provinces of Cambodia

===== Districts of Cambodia =====
Districts of Cambodia

===== Municipalities of Cambodia =====
Municipalities of Cambodia

- Capital of Cambodia: Phnom Penh
- Cities of Cambodia

=== Demography of Cambodia ===
Demographics of Cambodia

== Government and politics of Cambodia ==
Politics of Cambodia

- Form of government: parliamentary representative democratic monarchy
- Capital of Cambodia: Phnom Penh
- Elections in Cambodia
- Political parties in Cambodia

=== Branches of government ===
==== Executive branch of the government of Cambodia ====
- Head of state: King of Cambodia
- Head of government: Prime Minister of Cambodia
- Cabinet of Cambodia

==== Legislative branch of the government of Cambodia ====
- Parliament of Cambodia (bicameral)
  - Upper house: Senate of Cambodia
  - Lower house: National Assembly of Cambodia

==== Judicial branch of the government of Cambodia ====
Court system of Cambodia

=== Foreign relations of Cambodia ===
Foreign relations of Cambodia

- Diplomatic missions in Cambodia
- Diplomatic missions of Cambodia

==== International organization membership ====
The Kingdom of Cambodia is a member of:

- Asian Development Bank (ADB)
- Asia-Pacific Telecommunity (APT)
- Association of Southeast Asian Nations (ASEAN)
- Association of Southeast Asian Nations Regional Forum (ARF)
- East Asia Summit (EAS)
- Food and Agriculture Organization (FAO)
- Group of 77 (G77)
- International Bank for Reconstruction and Development (IBRD)
- International Civil Aviation Organization (ICAO)
- International Criminal Court (ICCt)
- International Criminal Police Organization (Interpol)
- International Development Association (IDA)
- International Federation of Red Cross and Red Crescent Societies (IFRCS)
- International Finance Corporation (IFC)
- International Fund for Agricultural Development (IFAD)
- International Labour Organization (ILO)
- International Maritime Organization (IMO)
- International Monetary Fund (IMF)
- International Olympic Committee (IOC)
- International Organization for Migration (IOM)
- International Organization for Standardization (ISO) (subscriber)

- International Red Cross and Red Crescent Movement (ICRM)
- International Telecommunications Satellite Organization (ITSO)
- Inter-Parliamentary Union (IPU)
- Multilateral Investment Guarantee Agency (MIGA)
- Nonaligned Movement (NAM)
- Organisation internationale de la Francophonie (OIF)
- Organisation for the Prohibition of Chemical Weapons (OPCW)
- Permanent Court of Arbitration (PCA)
- United Nations (UN)
- United Nations Conference on Trade and Development (UNCTAD)
- United Nations Educational, Scientific, and Cultural Organization (UNESCO)
- United Nations Industrial Development Organization (UNIDO)
- United Nations Mission in the Sudan (UNMIS)
- Universal Postal Union (UPU)
- World Customs Organization (WCO)
- World Federation of Trade Unions (WFTU)
- World Health Organization (WHO)
- World Intellectual Property Organization (WIPO)
- World Meteorological Organization (WMO)
- World Tourism Organization (UNWTO)
- World Trade Organization (WTO)

=== Law and order in Cambodia ===
Law of Cambodia

- Constitution of Cambodia
- Crime in Cambodia
- Human rights in Cambodia
  - LGBT rights in Cambodia
  - Freedom of religion in Cambodia
- Law enforcement in Cambodia

=== Military of Cambodia ===
Military of Cambodia

- Command
  - Commander-in-chief:
    - Ministry of Defence of Cambodia
- Forces
  - Army of Cambodia
  - Navy of Cambodia
  - Air Force of Cambodia
- Military history of Cambodia

=== Local government in Cambodia ===
Local government in Cambodia

== History of Cambodia ==
History of Cambodia

- Early history of Cambodia
- Funan
- Chenla
- Khmer Empire
- Economic history of Cambodia
- Military history of Cambodia

== Culture of Cambodia ==
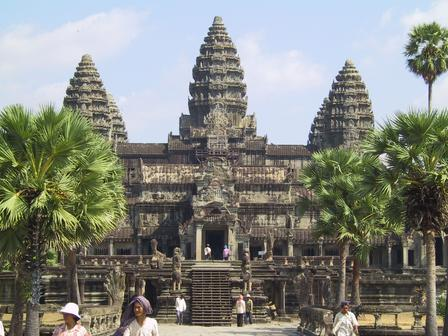
The entrance to the main temple of Angkor Wat

Culture of Cambodia

- Architecture of Cambodia
- Rural Khmer house
- Cuisine of Cambodia
- Languages of Cambodia
- Media in Cambodia
- National symbols of Cambodia
  - Coat of arms of Cambodia
  - Flag of Cambodia
  - National anthem of Cambodia
- People of Cambodia
- Prostitution in Cambodia
- Public holidays in Cambodia
- Religion in Cambodia
  - Buddhism in Cambodia
  - Christianity in Cambodia
  - Hinduism in Cambodia
  - Islam in Cambodia
- List of World Heritage Sites in Cambodia

=== The arts in Cambodia ===
- Cinema of Cambodia
- Literature of Cambodia
- Music of Cambodia

=== Sports in Cambodia ===
Sports in Cambodia

- Football in Cambodia
- Cambodia at the Olympics
- Cambodian martial art
  - Bokator
  - Kbachkun boraan
  - Kbachkun Dambong-veng
  - Khmer traditional wrestling
  - Pradal Serey

== Economy and infrastructure of Cambodia ==
Economy of Cambodia

- Economic rank, by nominal GDP (2007): 120th (one hundred and twentieth)
- Agriculture in Cambodia
- Banking in Cambodia
  - National Bank of Cambodia
- Communications in Cambodia
  - Internet in Cambodia
- Companies of Cambodia
- Currency of Cambodia: Riel
  - ISO 4217: KHR
- Economic history of Cambodia
- Energy in Cambodia
- Health care in Cambodia
- Mining in Cambodia
- Cambodia Stock Exchange
- Tourism in Cambodia
- Transport in Cambodia
  - Airports in Cambodia
  - Rail transport in Cambodia

== Education in Cambodia ==
Education in Cambodia

== Health in Cambodia ==
Health in Cambodia

== See also ==
Cambodia

- List of Cambodia-related topics
- List of international rankings
- Member state of the United Nations
- Outline of Asia
- Outline of geography
