= Electricity Authority of Cambodia =

The Electricity Authority of Cambodia (EAC; Khmer: អាជ្ញាធរអគ្គិសនីកម្ពុជា) is an autonomous government agency responsible for managing and administering the provision of electric power in Cambodia.

== Function ==
In conjunction with the Ministry of Industry, Mining and Energy, which is responsible for creating and operating the electrical power infrastructure, the role of the EAC involves both producers and consumers of electricity. On the supply side, the EAC licenses electric power suppliers, manages the systems of tariffs and fees, and in general regulates the economic environment of power production. On the consumer side, the EAC is responsible for managing consumer activities including managing customer contracts for major industrial and government customers, resolution of tariff-related disputes, and the issuance of warnings and penalties.

The authority is governed by a four-person board. The current chairman is H.E. Dr. Ty Norin. The EAC headquarters are located in Phnom Penh.

== Penetration ==
Cambodia, according to the World Bank in 2019, is one of the "fastest electrifying nations" in the world. As of the end of 2017, electric power reached 89% of the populace, and availability is increasing at roughly eight percent per year. Sixty-seven percent of electricity in Cambodian rural areas is delivered by the national grid, 31% from off-grid solutions. The EAC's 2018 annual report said that by year-end 2018, the nation's electricity supply had reached 2650 megawatts (MW), and was expected to increase to 2870 MW by 2019.

== Licensing ==
The EAC issues five types of licenses to producers of electricity:

1. Consolidated licenses
2. Generation licenses
3. Distribution licenses
4. Retail licenses
5. Special purpose transmission licenses

== See also ==
- Energy in Cambodia
- List of power stations in Cambodia
- Ministry of Industry, Mining and Energy (Cambodia)
