= Mineral industry of Cambodia =

In 2006, Cambodia's mineral resources remained, to a large extent, unexplored. Between 2003 and 2006, however, foreign investors from Australia, China, South Korea, Thailand, and the United States began to express their interest in Cambodia's potential for offshore oil and gas as well as such land-based metallic minerals as bauxite, copper, gold, and iron ore, and such industrial minerals as gemstones and limestone.

The identified mineral resources in Cambodia were bauxite, carbonate rocks, natural gas, gemstones, gold, manganese, petroleum, phosphate rock, salt, silica, and zircon. With the exception of carbonate rocks and gemstones, the country's mineral resources were largely unexploited. To attract domestic and foreign mining companies to invest in the mining sector, the Law of Minerals Management and Mining of Cambodia was promulgated by the government on July 13, 2001.

== Legal framework ==
The Ministry of Industry, Mines and Energy (MIME) is the main government agency that implements the country's mineral law and policy. The MIME's Department of Geology and Mines and Department of Energy are responsible for developing the country's mineral resources, providing mining assistance to the private sector, and administering mining-related regulations and inspections. The Cambodian Development Council (CDC) is the government agency that grants exploration licenses to investors. If exploration is successful, investors are required to present a master project plan to the CDC before being granted a mining license. The amount of investment approved for mining projects by the CDC totaled $181 million in 2005.

== Minerals in the national economy ==
The mining and quarry sector contributed only 0.39% of Cambodia's gross domestic product in 2005. The sector employed an estimated 19,000 people and accounted for only 0.2% of the country's total employment in 2005.

== Production ==
According to official statistics of the Department of Geology and Mines, the mining activities in Cambodia during the past 2 years involved the production of laterite blocks (red soil), limestone for cement manufacturing, sand and gravel, and crude stone for construction material. Other minerals, such as gemstones and gold, reportedly were mined in the central province of Kampong Cham and the northeastern provinces of Mondol Kiri and Ratanakiri. Production data for gemstones, gold, and limestone, however, were not available.

== Industry structure ==
Cambodia's mineral industry is still in its infant stage, and most mining companies are small-scale quarries that produce such construction materials as limestone, sand and gravel, and other construction aggregates. Production capacity data are not available for each of these small miners. Between 1994 and 2006, the MIME granted a total of 19 mineral exploration licenses to local and foreign companies, of which 11 projects were to explore for metallic minerals; 3, for iron ore; 2, for gold; 2, for bauxite; and 1, for coal. Between 2005 and 2006, the MIME had granted mining licenses to 11 companies; five of the licenses were for gemstone (zircon) projects, five were for limestone projects, and one was for a granite project.

As of 2012, the MIME reported that a total of 91 domestic and foreign companies held mining and exploration licenses in Cambodia. A total of 139 exploration projects were authorized under the licenses granted, out of which 13 had been licensed to conduct mining projects In early 2013, Chinese engineering firm Sinomach China Perfect Machinery Industry Corp and Cambodian Petrochemical Company announced they would jointly build a $2.3 billion oil refinery in Sihanoukville, which would be the first oil refinery in the country.

== Commodities ==
=== Gold ===
In February 2006, 100% of Liberty Mining International PTY. Ltd., which had 100% interest in two gold projects in the Ban Lung and the Ou Ya Dav/Andoung Meas areas in Ratanakiri Province, was acquired by Great Australian Resources Ltd. (GAR). During 2006, GAR reportedly undertook and completed an aeromagnetic survey of the two project areas and carried out an extensive soil geochemical sampling program in the Ban Lung area and a diamond drilling program in the Ou Ya Dav area.

=== Cement ===
An $80 million project to build a cement plant in Kampot Province, which was proposed by Siam Cement Group of Thailand, was approved by the government in late 2005. In January 2006, construction work on the 800,000 metric-ton-per-year cement plant was begun by Thai Siam Cement Industry in the Touk Meas, Kampot Province. The cement plant, which was located 130 km south of Phnom Penh, was scheduled to begin production during the second quarter of 2007. Kampot Cement Co. Ltd. and Tahi Boon Roon Cement Co. Ltd., which were licensed to quarry limestone in the areas of Tatung and Phnom Laag, would supply limestone to the cement plant.

=== Natural gas and petroleum ===
To further understand and expand the oil resources in Block A, which is located about 130 km off the west coast of Cambodia, Chevron Overseas Petroleum (Cambodia) Ltd. (COPCL) (an affiliated company of Chevron Corporation of the United States) and the Cambodian government signed a joint study agreement (JSA) in 2006. Under the JSA, COPCL was expected to drill five offshore exploration wells in Cambodia in 2006 and an additional five wells in 2007. Block A, which covers a 6,278-square-kilometer (km2) area of the Khmer Basin in the Gulf of Thailand, was owned by COPCL (55%), Moeco Cambodia Ltd. (an affiliate company of Japan's Mitsui Oil exploration Co.) (30%), and South Korea's GS Caltex Corp. (15%).

In September 2006, French TotalEnergies (TOT) and an unidentified Chinese oil company reportedly were competing for the rights to explore for potentially rich oil and gas reserves in Block B, which covers a 6,557-km2 area offshore the southeastern coast of Cambodia. According to a Cambodia Daily report, officials from Chinese National Petroleum Offshore Oil Co. (CNOOC) met with Cambodia's prime minister in July 2006 and expressed interest in Block B. According to an official of Cambodian National Petroleum Authority's petroleum exploration department, TOT was interested in the offshore field, but negotiations were slow.

Onshore oil and gas exploration began in January 2012 by a Japanese firm (JOGMEC) in the Preah Vihear provinceas part of "Basic Agreement for the Study and Survey Program in Block 17". Block 17 consists of a total area of 6,500 square kilometers of hilly forest in Kampong Thom, Preah Vihear and Siem Reap provinces.

== See also ==
- Economy of Cambodia
- Natural resources of Cambodia
- Child labour in Cambodia
