= Natural resources of Cambodia =

Natural resources are materials that occur in a natural form within environments. These can be classified as either biotic or abiotic on the basis of their origin. The landmass and the territorial waters of Cambodia contain a rather moderate amount, array and variety of resources. Apart from water, abiotic resources, such as minerals are generally rare. Still, advanced geo-scientific technologies have produced remarkable results and re-assessments in recent years, such as the localization of offshore oil and gas depots in the Gulf of Thailand. Cambodia, on the other hand possesses a relatively wide range of biotic resources, in particular timber, forest products, rare plants and a fauna of great diversity.

== Overview ==
Cambodia comprises an undulating plateau in its eastern part, a continuous flat plain (the Lake Tonle Sap lowland) interrupted only by isolated hills (Phnoms) and the Mekong River in the central part of the country, highlands to the north and northeast and the Cardamom Mountains in the south-west. The agricultural area was estimated at 5,500,000 ha (13,590,796 acres) in 2009, with estimated cultivated areas totaling 4,100,000 ha (10,131,321 acres). 96% of this area was used for annual crops and 3.8% for permanent crops.

== Water ==
The Cambodian hydro-logical system is dominated by the Mekong River and Tonle Sap Great Lake. From July to the end of October, when the level of the Mekong is high, water flows via the Tonle Sap River, increasing the size of the lake from 2,600 km2 to about 10,500 km^{2} (4,054 sq mi) at its maximum extent. The storage capacity of Tonle Sap Great Lake is about 72 km^{3} (17 cu mi). When the level of the Mekong decreases, the Tonle Sap River reverses its flow and water flows back from the Tonle Sap Lake into the Mekong River.

The Mekong flows from north to south, over a distance of around 480 km. About 86% of Cambodia's territory (156,000 km^{2} (60,232 sq mi)) is included in the Mekong's basin with the remaining 14% draining directly towards the Gulf of Thailand. Cambodia represents 20% of the total catchment area of the Mekong basin. Total internal renewable water resources have been estimated at over 120 km^{3} (29 cu mi).

=== Hydroelectric power ===
Cambodia's hydroelectric generating potential is considerable, especially from the swift current of the middle Mekong River where it flows through the Stoeng Treng and Kracheh provinces. Other sites of minor importance are on rivers in the highlands of the northeastern and north-central parts of the country. Although the Tonle Sap is Cambodia's dominant hydraulic feature, the rivers flowing into this great lake have little or no exploitable potential.

In general, development of Cambodia's water potential appears to be more important for the expansion of irrigation than for the production of electricity. The largest hydroelectric dam in Cambodia is Lower Se San 2 Dam which began operation in November 2017 and scheduled for full operation by October 2018. Stung Treng Dam is a proposed hydroelectric dam with an average production of 4,870 GWh per year, almost 2.5 times the average production of Lower Se San 2.

== Forests ==
The forests of Cambodia include evergreen, semi-evergreen, deciduous, swamp, mangrove and bamboo forest in various conditions from closed to disturbed and mosaic formations. There are also re-growth and plantation forests as well as open forest types including evergreen shrub land and dry deciduous shrub land. About 10% of Cambodia's flora is endemic. Cover is largely dominated by moist lowland evergreen forest, semi-evergreen forest and deciduous forest. A unique seasonally inundated forest is found along the flood plains surrounding the Tonle Sap Lake. Extensive and fairly intact mangroves are found along the southern marine coast.

Forests, which cover approximately 70 percent of Cambodia and which potentially constitute a second pillar of the economy in addition to the primary one, agriculture. A survey in the 1960s disclosed that Cambodia had more than 130,000 square kilometres of forests that contained many species of tropical growth and trees but not teak or other valuable sources of hardwood. Some destruction of the forest environment undoubtedly occurred in the war that followed in the 1970s, but its extent has not been determined. Most of the heavy fighting took place in areas uncovered by dense tropical jungle.

As of late 1987, forest resources had not yet been fully exploited because of poor security in the countryside and a lack of electrical and mechanical equipment, such as power tools and lumber trucks. Nevertheless, the Cambodian government reportedly has discussed with Vietnam the possibility of coordinated reforestation programs.

=== Timber ===
Timber and firewood are the main forest products. Timber is considered one of the four economic initiatives of the government's First Plan. Timber production was projected to reach a peak of 200,000 cubic meters in 1990. However, timber production is employing underage children according to the Bureau of International Labor Affairs' List of Goods Produced by Child Labor or Forced Labor and the percentage of working children aged 5 to 14 years old has reached 85% in the agricultural sector.

Timber production has also had an important role in Cambodia's deforestation.

== Biodiversity and wildlife ==
Cambodia is one of the most biodiverse countries in South East Asia. In 2010, the MoE submitted its Fourth National Report to the Convention on Biological Diversity (MoE/CBD, 2010) which includes information on overall biodiversity status, trends and threats; national strategies and action plans, and; an assessment of cross-sectoral integration of biodiversity considerations.

== Energy ==
The main energy source in Cambodia is wood, accounting for 80% of national energy consumption (UNEP, 2010). Most households, even in urban areas, rely on traditional energy sources since fossil fuels are either not available or too expensive. 94% of the population living in rural areas relies on wood, charcoal, car batteries and kerosene (UNCDF, 2010). Most primitive fuels are sourced from forests; in rural areas in the form of fuel wood and in towns and cities as charcoal. The UNDP forecasts that wood-derived fuels will remain the main source of cooking energy in rural areas until 2030.

== Mineral resources ==
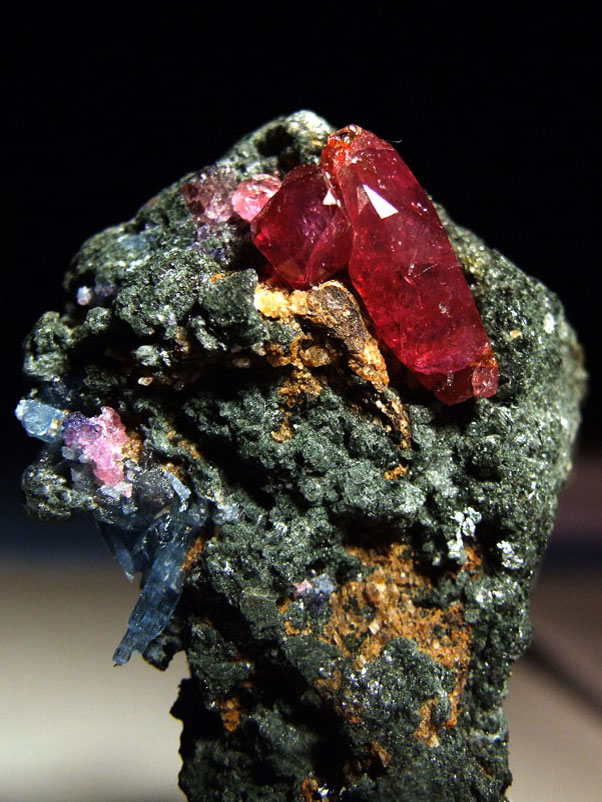
ruby gemstone

Cambodia's mineral resources are moderate and as a result the mining and quarry industry contributed only 0.39% of Cambodia's gross domestic product in 2005. The sector employed an estimated 19,000 people and accounted for only 0.2% of the country's total employment in 2005.

Mineral resources of significance, includes:

- Gemstones - Gemstone areas - Rubies, sapphires, and zircons - are located in Samlot district of Battambang, Paillin, Ratanakkiri, and Takeo Province.
- Iron ore - Hermatite (Fe203); Magnetite (Fe304); Limonite (2Fe203, 3H2O) - was found In the late 1950s and throughout the 1960s, however by Chinese experts in two areas, one located in Phnom Deck and the others located in Koh Keo of Preah Vihear Province, and Thalaborivath of Stung Treng Province. According to General Department of Mineral, the total iron reserves in Phnom Deck area are estimated at 5-6 million tons and possible reserves of high-grade iron ore, ranging from 2.5 million to 4.8 million tons, exist in the northern part of the country.
- Gold - Gold deposits are to be found in the five provinces: Kampong Cham (The Rumchek in Memot area), Kampong Thom (Phnom Chi area), Preah Vihear (Phnom Deck in Roveing district), Ratanakiri (Oyadav district) and Mondulkiri.
- Bauxite – was found in
- Manganese (Mn) - Chinese explorations revealed manganese ore reserves, estimated at 120,000 tons, in Kampong Thom Province.
- Phosphates - A few thousand tons of phosphate are extracted annually in Kampot Province and processed locally or in Battambang Province.
- Coal - is found in Phum Talat on the east side of the Tonle San River, Stung Treng Province. There are 27 individual coal seams identified with a reserve of 7 million tons of coal.
- Limestone
- Clay

== Oil and natural gas ==
In late 1969, the Cambodian government granted a permit to a French company to explore for petroleum in the Gulf of Thailand. By 1972 none had been located, and exploration ceased when the Khmer Republic (see Appendix B) fell in 1975. Subsequent oil and gas discoveries in the Gulf of Thailand and in the South China Sea, however, could spark renewed interest in Cambodia's offshore area, especially because the country is on the same continental shelf as its Southeast Asian oil-producing neighbors. An attempt in the early 2020s to extract oil from the Apsara field ended in failure, however, after production did not meet expectations.

== See also ==
- Economy of Cambodia
- Geography of Cambodia
- List of protected areas of Cambodia
- Deforestation in Cambodia
