= 2013 Southern Vietnam and Cambodia blackout =

Power outage in Vietnam and Cambodia

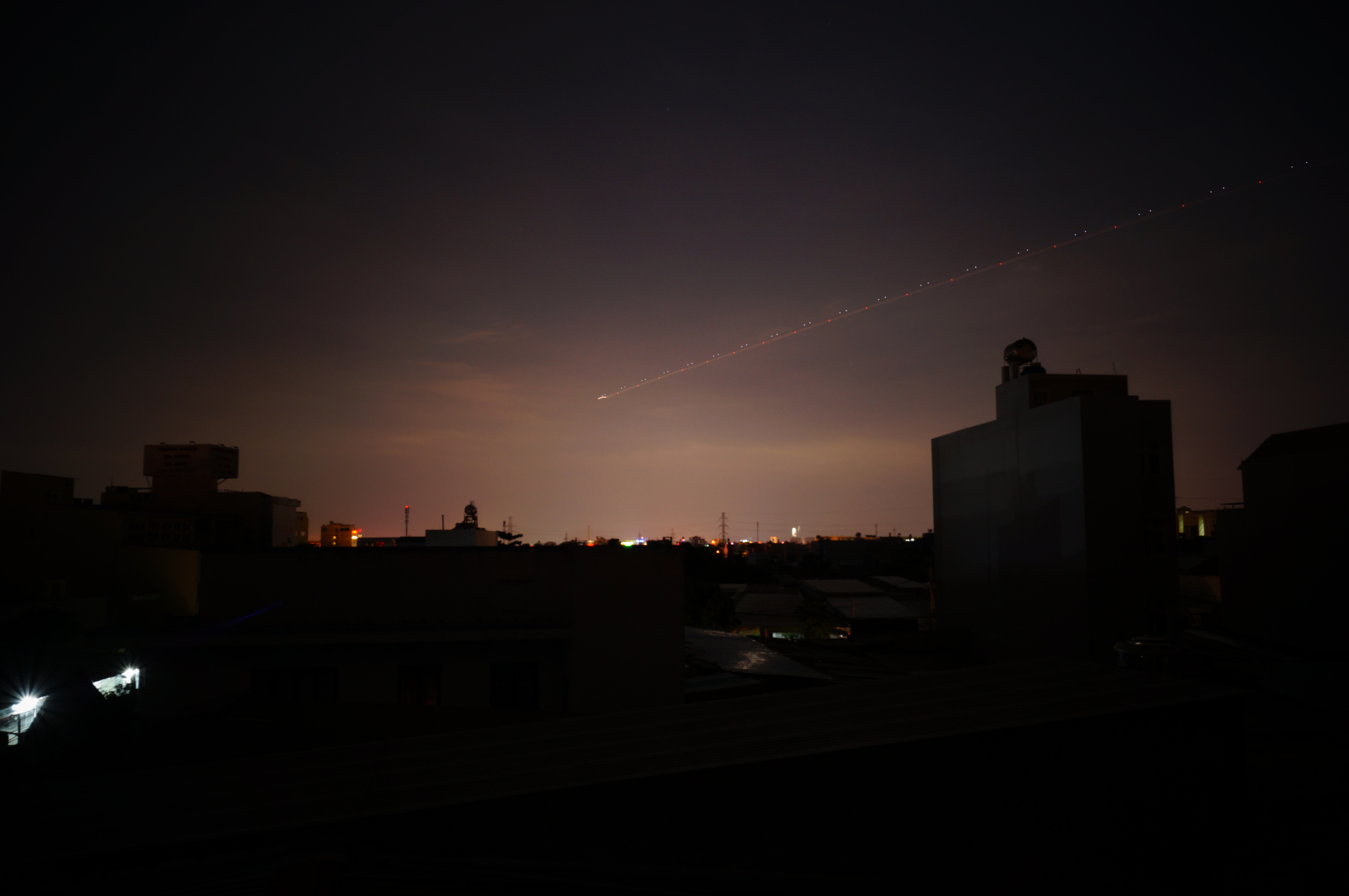
- Darkened Ho Chi Minh City skyline at 6:47 PM on 22 May
- Date: 14:00, 22 May 2013 (+07:00)
- Duration: 8 hours
- Location: 19 southern provinces and the provinces of Bình Thuận, Ninh Thuận, Lâm Đồng and part of Cambodia.
- Cause: Tree brushing against a power line
- Outcome: 8 million customers affected
- Property damage: 14 billion VND (initial estimate)

The 2013 Southern Vietnam and Cambodia blackout was a power outage in the southern region of Vietnam on 22 May 2013, affecting millions of people.

== Immediate impact ==
Power went off at around 14:14 (UTC+7) on 22 May 2013.

== Cause ==
A careless move of a truck deployed to plant trees in New Bình Dương City urban area is the direct cause for the massive power outage in the southern region of Vietnam. When moving a tree on Wednesday afternoon, the truck let the tree bump onto a line in the national power grid (500 KV).

== Effects ==
This incident caused a massive blackout in 22 provinces and cities in the South of Vietnam. In fact, there has not been any kind of property insurance for these assets in case of unexpected massive and long outage. It even caused the electricity cut for the capital city of Cambodia.

== See also ==
- Energy in Cambodia
- List of major power outages
