= Child labour in Cambodia =

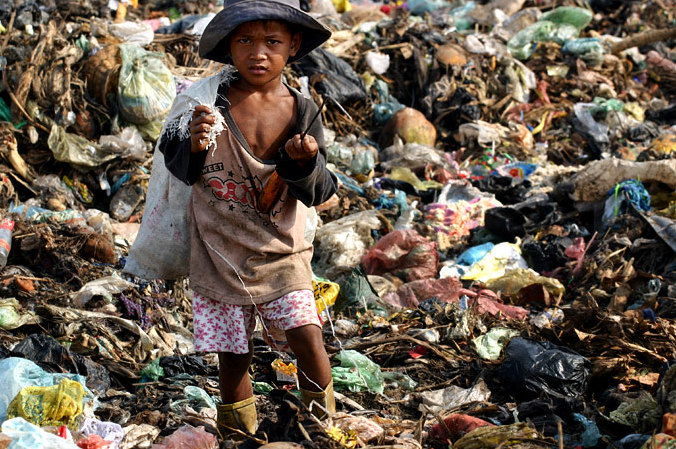
A Cambodian child scavenging in a landfill site.

Child labour refers to the full-time employment of children under a minimum legal age. In 2003, an International Labour Organization (ILO) survey reported that one in every ten children in the capital above the age of seven was engaged in child domestic labour. Children who are too young to work in the fields work as scavengers. They spend their days rummaging in dumps looking for items that can be sold for money. Children also often work in the garment and textile industry, in prostitution, and in the military.

In Cambodia, the state had ratified both the Minimum Age Convention (C138) in 1999 and Worst Forms of Child Labour Convention (C182) in 2006, which are adopted by the International Labour Organization (ILO). For the former convention, Cambodia had specified the minimum age to work to be at age 14. Yet, significant levels of child labour appear to be found in Cambodia.

In 1998, ILO estimated that 24.1% of children in Cambodia aged between 10 and 14 were economically active. Many of these children work long hours and Cambodia Human Development Report 2000 reported that approximately 65,000 children between the ages of 5 and 13 worked 25 hours a week and did not attend school. There are also many initiative and policies put in place to decrease the prevalence of child labour such as the United States generalized system of preferences, the U.S.-Cambodia textile agreement, ILO Garment Sector Working Conditions Improvement Project, and ChildWise Tourism.

There is a need to eliminate child labour in Cambodia as a report by UNICEF states that child labourers could be missing out on education. When children do not attend school, they are denied the knowledge and skills needed for national development. Without education and vital life skills, they are vulnerable to abuse and exploitation, which may exacerbate the existing cycle of poverty in their families. Consequently, this lack in productivity due to lack of education will hold back economic growth in Cambodia.

== Definition of child labour ==
The International Labour Organization (ILO) defines child labour as work that deprives them of their childhood, potential, and dignity. They also define it as work that is harmful to their physical and mental health. This includes work that disrupts their schooling, but does not include work such as working in the home or in a family business. They define the worst forms of child labour as work that involves slavery, conscription for the military, prostitution, trafficking of drugs, and any work that is harmful to the health and safety of the children. UNICEF defines child labour as children between 5 and 14 years old who do domestic work and economic activity.

=== Minimum age convention, 1973 ===
The ILO created the “Minimum Age Convention”, which was ratified by Cambodia in 1999. The purpose of this convention was to determine the minimum age permissible for employment, with the larger goal of eradicating child labour. They define the minimum age of employment at fifteen years old, except in countries with poorly developed economies and educational facilities. In such countries the minimum age of employment is fourteen years old. For work that harms a child's health, safety, or morals, the minimum age is eighteen years old.

=== Worst forms of child labour convention, 1999 ===
The ILO created the “Worst Forms of Child Labour Convention”, which was ratified by Cambodia in 2006. The purpose of this convention was to prohibit and eliminate the worst forms of child labour, with children being people under the age of 18. This convention required all members to create programs to eliminate child labour, monitor these programs, and provide education to the children removed from the worst forms of child labour. They also require that each country recognize that girls and boys have different experiences with child labour.

== Industries ==
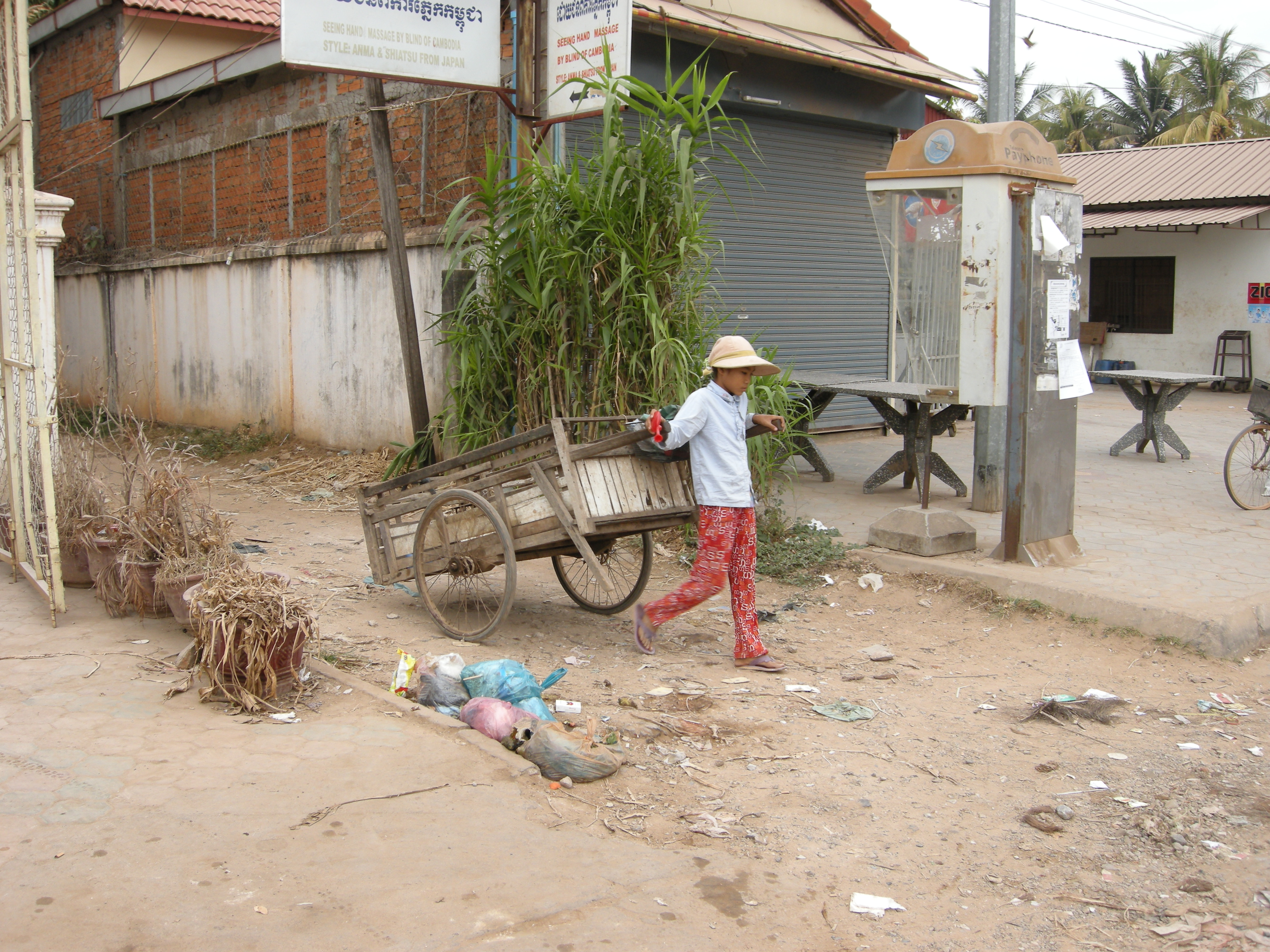
Child working in Siem Reap, Cambodia

=== Agriculture ===
In a study by Edmonds in 2001, 73% of economically active Cambodian children worked in the agricultural sector. The United States Department of Labour reported some of the tasks the children have to do in the agricultural sector. These include fishing, peeling shrimp, shucking crabs, producing tobacco, spraying pesticides, and logging for timber. The Bureau of International Labour Affairs reports that as of 2015 Cambodia's Ministry of Labour and Vocational Training has regulations for children working the agricultural industry, but has not begun enforcing them.

=== Garments and textiles ===
Two-thirds of Cambodia's workforce is in the garment industry. In the 1990s Cambodia was not a member of the World Trade Organization (WTO), therefore it was not subject to quota limits on exports. This led to an increase in foreign investment in Cambodia's garment industry. In 1998, the media exposed a Nike supply factory utilizing child labour. This led to the creation of the U.S-Cambodia Textile Agreement. Even with this policy there is still evidence of child labour in the Cambodian garment sector as of 2004.

=== Prostitution ===
Prostitution of any kind is prohibited in Cambodia, but is tolerated. Cambodian children are often prostituted in the sex tourism industry. In a study by Willis, there were 5950 children involved in prostitution in Cambodia in 1999. Young virgin girls are especially sought after, and some men have justified this by saying that it is the best way to avoid contracting AIDS. Prostitution has significant effects on the mental health and physical health of children. In a study in Cambodia, all the women and girls in the study had been "victimised and felt helpless, damaged, degraded, betrayed, and shamed. Many of the young women reported depression, hopelessness, inability to sleep, nightmares, poor appetite, and a sense of resignation". In the same study Willis found that prostituted children have higher rates of sexually transmitted diseases (STDs) than non-prostituted children in many countries. The STD rate of prostituted adolescents in Cambodia is 36% while the STD rate of adolescents worldwide is 5%. Child prostitutes also have higher STD rates than adult prostitutes because they have less power to ask for condoms. The United Nations conducted field visits in Cambodia and found that "60 to 70 per cent of the child victims of prostitution are HIV positive". Children from other countries such as Vietnam are also being trafficked to become prostitutes in Cambodia. In fact, a study by Hughes reported that "one-third of the 55,000 women in prostitution in Cambodia were under age 18 and most were Vietnamese". Many studies have found that as of 1995, there are still numerous prostitutes in Cambodia under the age of eighteen. The sexual exploitation of children has increased due to the commercialization of the internet because it offered privacy and had few regulations.

=== Military use of children ===
Children get conscripted by the military due to being bystanders and targets of conflict. Armed conflict poses serious threats to the health and safety of children. The United Nations has reported that children have been seen playing with landmines and unexploded ordnance. The study by the UN also found that forty-three percent of mine explosion victims in military hospitals were conscripted when they were between ten and sixteen years old. The health effects of such mine explosions are extremely severe, especially for children. The UN study reported that twenty percent of children involved in mine and unexploded ordnance die due to their injuries. The children who survive often receive amputations and suffer complications from these amputations, which can also lead to financial disaster for the family.

== Causes of child labour in Cambodia ==
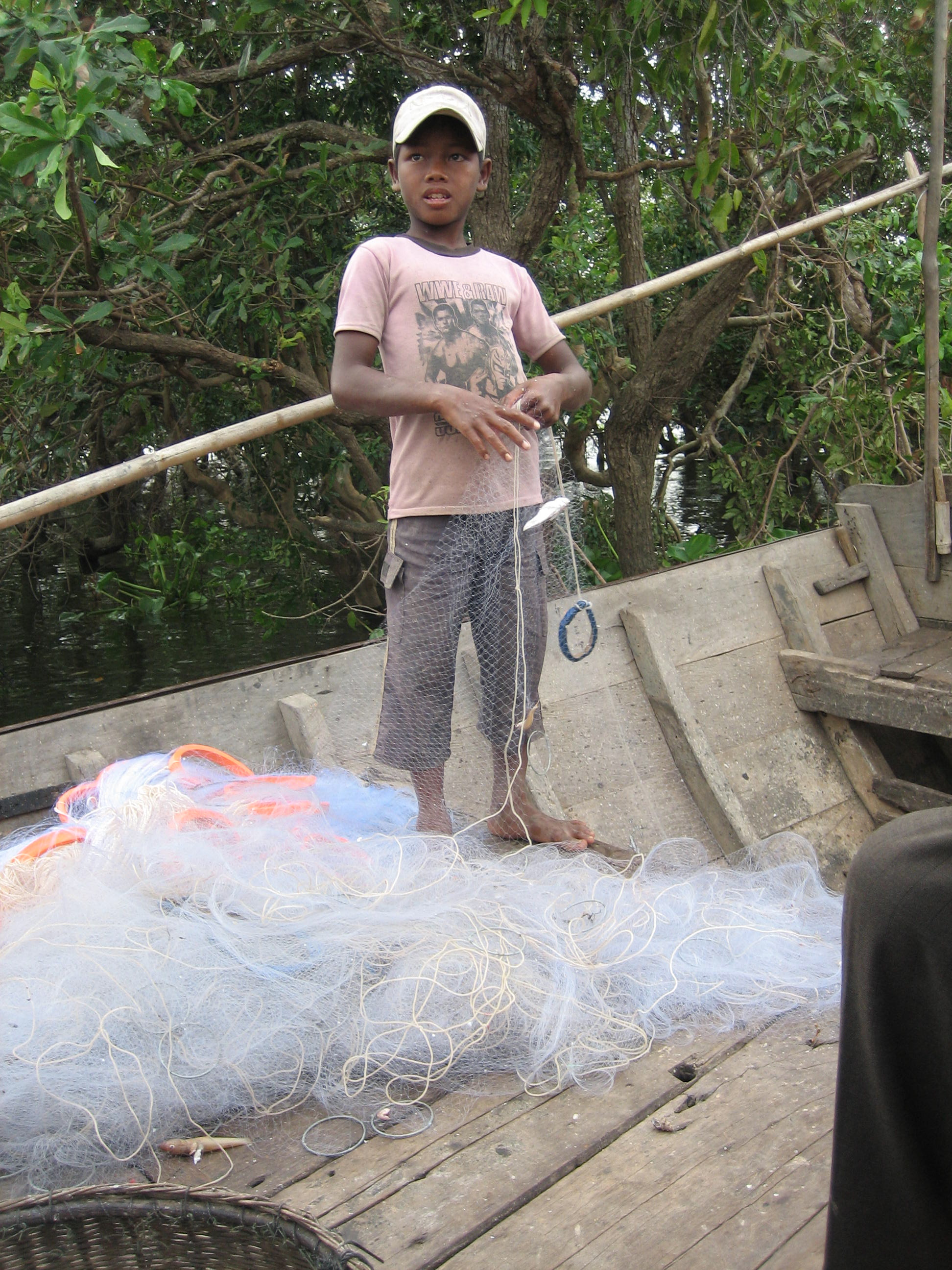
Child fishing in Tonlé Sap, Cambodia

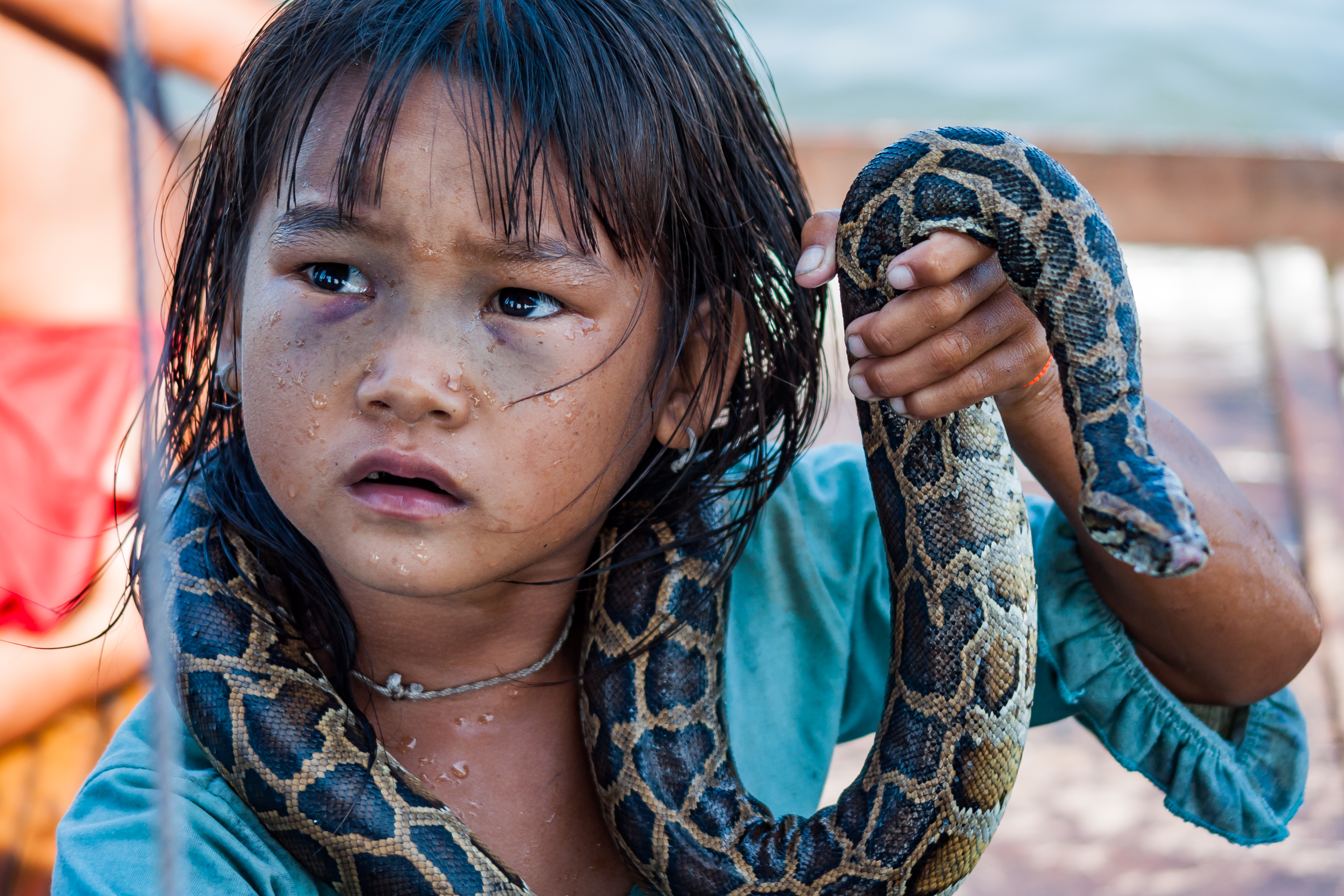
A little girl making money for her family by posing with a snake in a water village of Tonle Sap Lake

=== Economic growth ===
It is believed that Cambodia's economic growth and progress is a contributing factor to the increasing number of child labourers. The huge demands of the construction industry is one example where it has pushed children to work in factories or brick kilns, foreclosing the option of school education for most of them.

=== Tourism ===
==== Street peddlers ====
Others spend their days in the streets peddling. Tourists play a key role in this form of child labour as many are willing to buy from these children, out of good intentions, escalating demands. This reinforces the notion that children are more valuable in the streets than at school. However, there are also arguments that it might be better to buy from child sellers or they might be forced to work in even more hazardous activities.

==== Sex tourism ====
Children are often sought from impoverished areas are often brought to entertainment and tourism areas, to work in the red light district. Most of these prostitutes start their job between ten and sixteen years old. When interviewed, child sex tourists report that they prefer to have sex with virgins because it is safer. Sex tourists go to Cambodia because the brothels are cheap and the price of a virgin in Cambodia is much lower than those in nearby countries and the United States. Child sex tourism is a violation of the UN Convention of the Rights of a Child, and of the Optional Protocol on the Sale of Children, Child Prostitution and Child Pornography.

=== Poverty ===
Child labour was mutually reinforced by poverty and underdevelopment; however, they are not the primary causes. A study by Kim reports that wealth and child labour are actually positively associated, because wealthy families have assets like land. They say that this finding poses problems for policy makers because a majority of them believe that all children who work are poor. Since policy makers in Cambodia believe that poverty is the major cause of child labour they focus their efforts on reducing poverty rather than targeting child labour directly. Kim's study finds that poverty and child labour are not as closely linked as was previously thought, which would mean that the efforts of the policy makers are not as effective as possible.

== Effects of child labour in Cambodia ==
A common ramification of child labour is denied access to basic services, namely education and healthcare. The Children's Rights Department of the Cambodian League for Promotion and Defense of Human Rights (LICADHO) survey showed that out of 400 children aged 5 to 17 who worked as garbage dump scavengers only 35% went to school.

The economic and societal impacts are far reaching, hence raising awareness and efforts to prohibit child labour are important.

=== Education effects ===
In 2005, Cambodia had a very high primary school enrollment rate of 95.1 percent, but the primary school completion rate was only 46.8 percent. Secondary school completion was even lower with a rate of 25.7 percent. At the same time 52 percent of 7- to 14-year-old children were economically active. A study by Kim (2011) reports that most employed children in Cambodia are enrolled in school but their employment is associated with late school entry, negative impacts on their learning outcomes, and increased drop out rates. These associations are stronger with girls. Boys tend to be more involved in economic activities, but girls tend to have lower school enrollment rates. Currently, there are no educational policies to address the significant impact that child labour has on educational outcomes in Cambodia. Child labour has short term positive economic effects because the children are bringing in more money for their families, but the long-term economic effects are negative due to the lack of schooling.

=== Health effects ===
One of the definitions of child labour by the ILO is work that negatively impacts a child's health. Child labourers have been found to suffer from health problems. For instance, carrying excessive loads may cause stunt development. There is the possibility of child scavengers made injured by sharp, contaminated objects or moving traffic. Other problems include long hours of work, respiratory and skin diseases, life-threatening tetanus, joint and bone deformities.

A study by Roggero found that child labour negatively affects the health of the children and that child labour was a significant predictor of undernourishment. They also found that in regions with a high prevalence of child labour, childhood morbidity associated with HIV/AIDS, non-HIV infectious diseases, and malaria was largely correlated with child labour. They concluded these results by saying that they suggest that countries with high levels of child labour have low health status.

A study by Miwa Kana in 2010 found that child labour actually improved the health and nutritional status when the number of hours is within a threshold level. The same study found that the oldest children in the study who worked the longest hours still worked below this threshold. Note that in this study took place in the rice-growing area of Cambodia and that the extent of child labour differs in different agro-ecological conditions and economic conditions.

== Initiative and policies ==
The Cambodian government is working together with NGOs and UN agencies to tackle the problem of child labour. One of the major donors is the U.S. Department of Labour. Since 2001, the department has funded ILO's International Program on the Elimination of Child Labour to provide education and other services to children engaged, or are at risk of engaging in exploitive labour.

There has been some progress in Cambodia. In 2008 there were 2000 children working in the salt industry in the Kampot province. By 2010 it has decreased to around 250 children.
However, Cambodia has been attributed 11 goods, all of them being produced by child labor, in the 2014 U.S. Department of Labor report on such working conditions around the world.

=== United States generalized system of preferences ===
The United States Generalized System of Preferences (GSP) gives countries greater access to the United States market if they attempt to give adequate rights to workers. The countries have to ensure the freedom of association, the right to organize and bargain collectively, and the prohibition of forced and child labor. The U.S. does suspend GSP provisions when labour rights are violated, but often fails to do so when the country involved is a major partner in U.S. trade. Lithium

=== U.S.-Cambodia textile agreement ===
The U.S.-Cambodia Textile Agreement (UCTA) was created as a better alternative to the Generalized System of Preferences. The goal of the UCTA was to increase the garment export quotas by rewarding better working conditions. It was a non-state centered model, which allowed for better enforcement of the regulations. It enforced labour standards in areas such as child labor, forced labor, sexual harassment, hours of work, minimum wages, and freedom of association. This trade agreement was unique because it provided market rewards rather than punishments and because the International Labour Organization (ILO) was in charge of monitoring the labour standards.

=== ILO Garment Sector Working Conditions Improvement Project ===
The goals of the project included maintaining an independent monitoring system, creating new laws to improve working conditions, increasing worker and employer awareness of labour laws and rights, and increasing government capacity to comply with national and international labour standards. Monitoring by the ILO has provided much more legitimacy than private monitoring by transnational firms and non-governmental organizations tied to transnational firms. The ILO's monitoring system is characterized by tripartite and consensus governance by employers, unions, and governments. It is more legitimate than private monitoring because it has no connection to the firms. The ILO monitoring system focuses on enforcing Cambodia's labor laws and ILO conventions that Cambodia has ratified.

=== ChildWise Tourism ===
ChildWise Tourism was developed in 1999 and it aims to inform tourism staff on how to identify and respond to situations of potential child sexual exploitation. It involves training modules and educational materials for travel and tourism students, educators, and the tourism industry. The training sessions take place in Thailand, Indonesia, Cambodia, Philippines, Lao PDR, Vietnam, and Myanmar.

== See also ==
- Youth in Cambodia
