= Ministry of Mines and Energy (Cambodia) =

Government ministry of Cambodia

- ក្រសួងរ៉ែនិងថាមពល; Krâsuŏng Rê nĭng Thamôpôl

Agency overview
- Jurisdiction: Government of Cambodia
- Headquarters: 79, 89 Pasteur St. (51), Phnom Penh
- Minister responsible: Keo Rattanak, Minister of Mines and Energy
- Website: mme.gov.kh

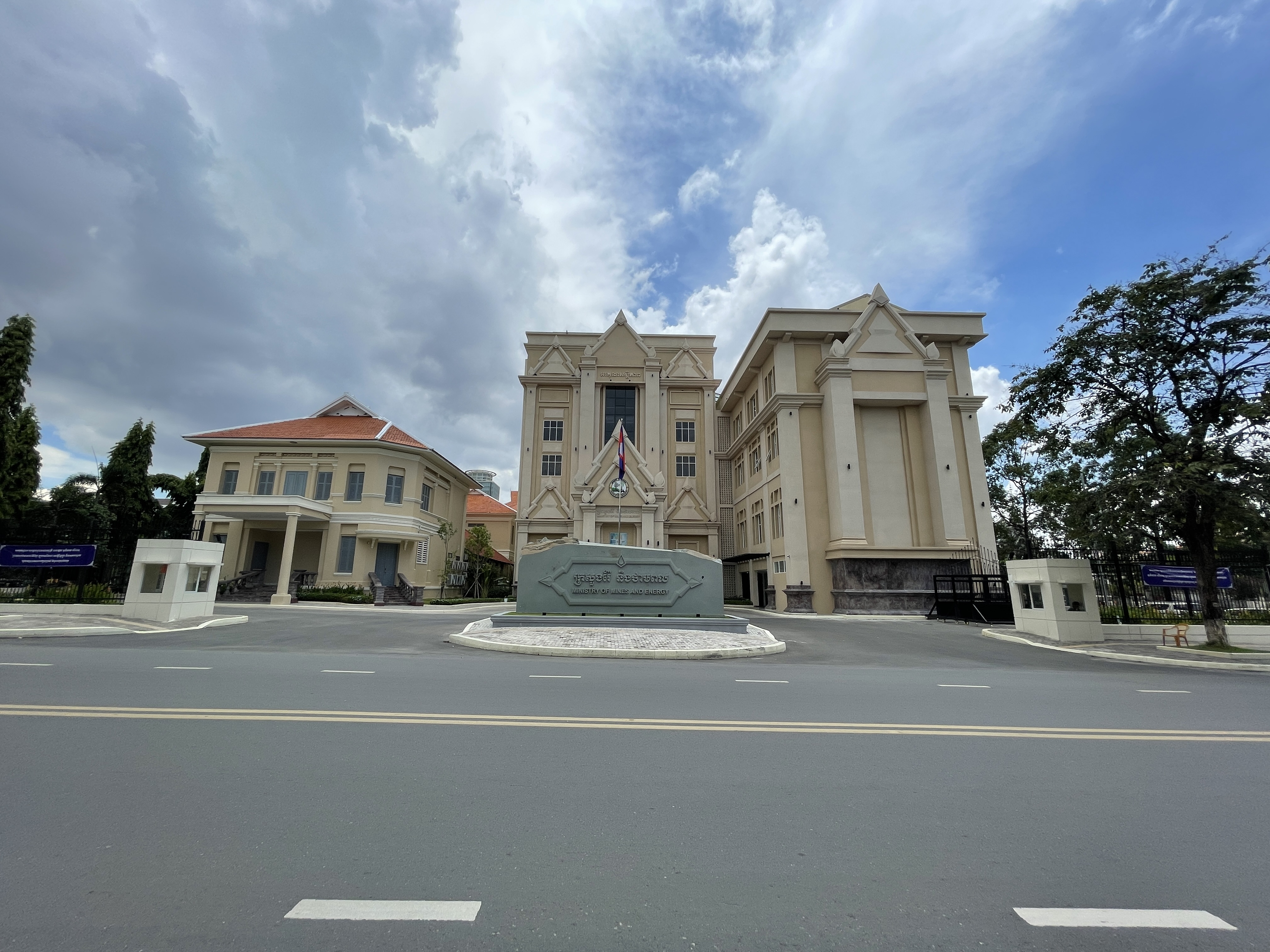
Ministry of Mines and Energy (Cambodia)

The Ministry of Mines and Energy (MME; Khmer: ក្រសួងរ៉ែនិងថាមពល, UNGEGN: Krâsuŏng Rê nĭng Thamôpôl) is a government ministry responsible for governing and the mining industry and the energy industry of Cambodia. It is located in Phnom Penh.

== Structure ==
Structure
| Suy Sem | Minister of Mines and Energy | |
| Ith Praing | Secretary of State | Department of Hydroelectricity; Department of Energy Development; Department of Atomic Energy and Technique; Department of Renewable Energy |
| Ho Vichit | Secretary of State | Department of Promotion and Development of Petroleum Resources; Department of Promotion and Development of Mineral Resources; Department of Construction Materials Resource |
| Dith Tina | Secretary of State | Department of Geology; Department of Petroleum Research; Department of Petroleum Technology, Operations Supervision, and Energy Security |
| Sok Khavan | Secretary of State | Department of Legal Affairs; Department of International Petroleum Affairs; Department of Cooperation and ASEAN Affairs |
| Meng Saktheara | Secretary of State | Department of Petroleum Concession Management; Department of Mineral Exploration Management; Department of Mining |
| Pen Chhorda | Secretary of State | Bureau of Inspection; Department of Internal Audit; Department of Accounting and Finance; Department of Administration and IT; Department of Personnel |

== See also ==
- Energy in Cambodia
- Mineral industry of Cambodia
- Ministry of Commerce, Cambodia
