= List of power stations in Cambodia =

This article lists all power stations in Cambodia.

== Coal ==
Power plant	Capacity (MW)	Units	Year completed
Sihanoukville II	405	3 x 135 MW	2015
Sihanoukville I	270	2 x 60 MW, 1 x 150 MW	2014

== Hydroelectric ==
Hydroelectric station	Capacity (MW)	Units	Year completed
Russei Chrum Krom	338		2015
Stung Tatay	246	3 x 82 MW	2014
Kamchay 1	193.2	3 x 64.4 MW	2011
Stung Atay	120	4 x 25 MW, 2 x 10	2014
Kamchay 2	10.1	3 x 3.1 MW, 1 x 800 kW	2009
Kirirom 3	18	2 x 9 MW	2013
Kirirom 1 Hydropower Dam	12	2 x 6 MW	1965
O Chum 2 Hydropower Dam	1		1992
Lower Se San 2 Dam	400	5 x 80 MW	2017

== Solar ==
Projects above 5 MW, as of 2021:

Photovoltaic station	Capacity (MW)	Year completed
Battambang	60	2020
Krakor	60	2020
Pursat	30	2020
Bavet City	10	2017
Kampong Chhnang	60	2020
Kampong Speu	80	2020

== See also ==
- Energy in Cambodia
