= Energy in Cambodia =

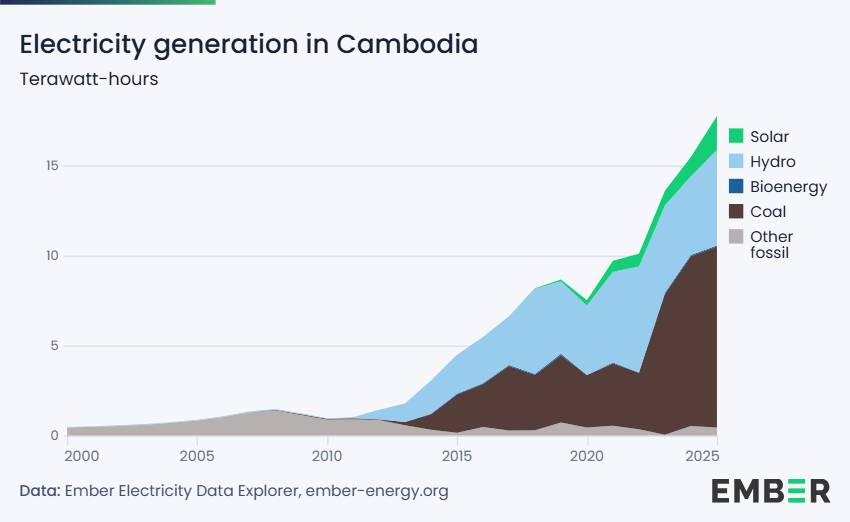
Electricity generation in Cambodia in terawatt-hours

Energy in Cambodia covers the energy sources used in the country including renewables, fossil fuels, biomass, and hydro-power.

Cambodia had, in 2024, 5044 MW of electricity capacity installed. According to the IEA, Cambodia is the second least electrified country in the region. The main sources of generation are coal and hydro, with 59% of total generation coming from coal. The coal is imported, with 67% of total energy (including oil and gas) being imported as of 2023, an over 800% growth since 2000.

Energy security in Cambodia is vulnerable to transport shocks like the war in Ukraine and the 2026 war in Iran. As of 2025, the high ratio of coal in the economy was a driver of high fossil fuel emissions incompatible with the long term nationally determined contribution commitments.

Energy consumption in Cambodia has been increasing about 20% a year. Domestic production of energy is mostly concentrated in burning biofuels, with limited ability to expand hydro production. In order to meet the demand growth and reduce emissions, the country has set a goal for 70% production from renewables, with solar expanding rapidly in recent years. This planning is governed by the Clean Cambodia Strategy and Power Development Plan, which is overseen by the Ministry of Mines and Energy.

== Historic energy development ==
Since 1991, Cambodia has been included in the United Nations' list of least developed countries. The country has been growing its electrical grid in order to provide more homes and families with electricity. Along with other ASEAN member states, Cambodia remains one of the most vulnerable countries to climate change in the world; therefore, it is recommended that the country focuses on developing more renewable energy as part of climate change mitigation policies.

Much of the country's energy is generated through hydro power and fossil fuel (coal for electricity and petroleum products for transport and industry). Fossil fuels are imported to the country which can be costly because of the changes in market price. Cambodia controls offshore oil reserves in the Gulf of Thailand; however, the only attempt to extract oil ended in the failure in 2021 of the Apsara field project after production did not meet expectations.

== Fossil fuels ==
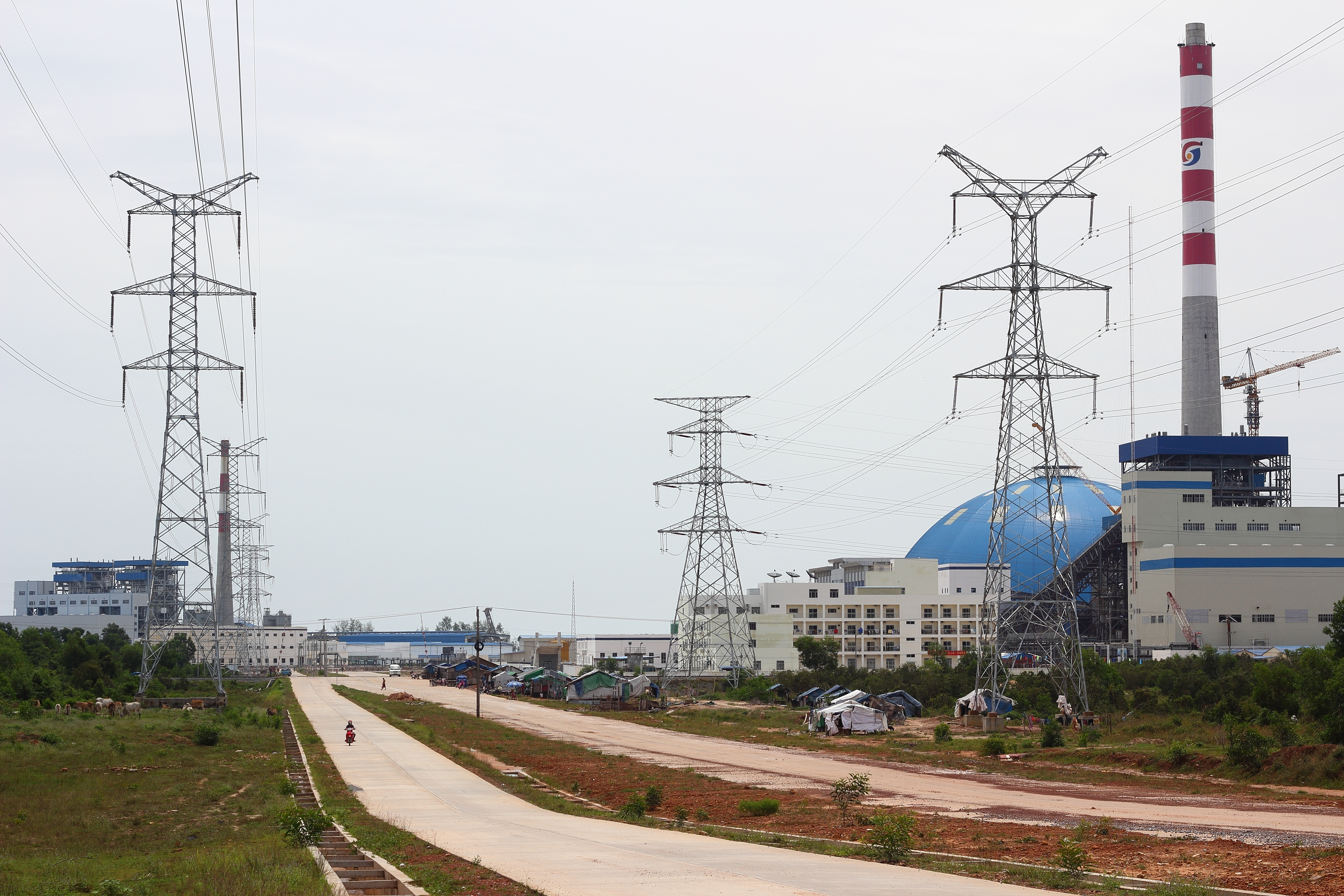
A coal-power plant in Stueng Hav District, Sihanoukville

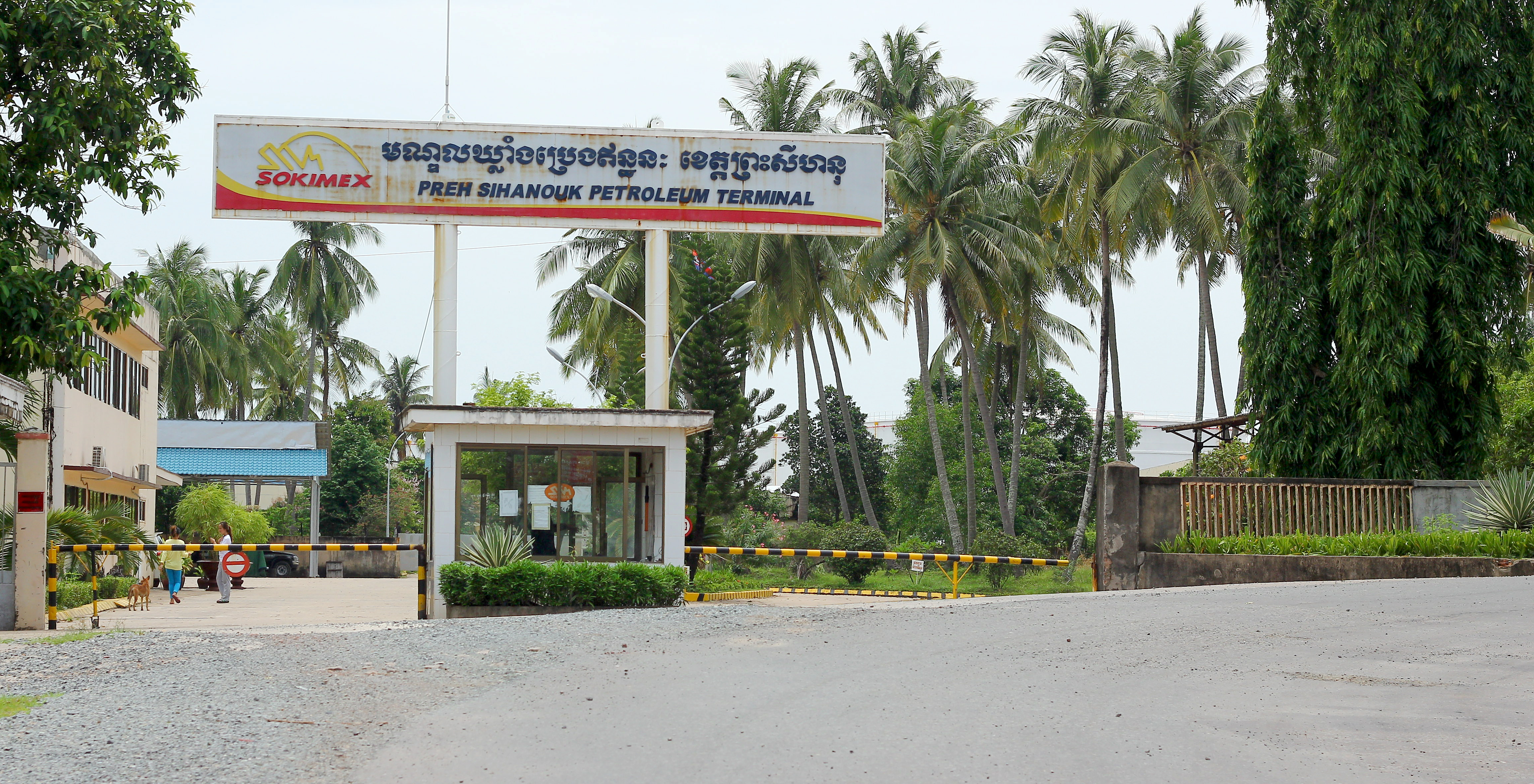
Petroleum products are imported into Cambodia, with the majority used for transport. Some local production of crude oil has to be exported for processing.

The main sources of generation are coal and hydro, with 59% of total generation coming from coal. The coal is imported, with 67% of total energy (including oil and gas) being imported as of 2023. The government of Cambodia has committed to not building any new coal power plants.

Though one 900 MW LNG plant is under construction since 2024, no other LNG infrastructure is in production in Cambodia with the goal of opening in 2027. The plant is being built as a peaking power plant to provide grid reliability, but energy analysts warn that it is likely to be a financially unsustainable plant -- with Cambodia having little negotiating power in LNG markets.

In 2023, 36.5% of total final energy is oil for a total production for 147 674 TJ of energy. Though there is some raw oil extraction, refined oil products are entirely imported with no refining capacity in the country. 70% of the oil products are consumed in transportation.

== Renewable energy ==
In order to meet the demand growth, the country has set a goal for 70% production from renewables. This planning is governed by the Clean Cambodia Strategy and Power Development Plan, which is overseen by the Ministry of Mines and Energy. The plan targets 1000 MW by 2030 and 3155 MW by 2040 of additional solar and 1560 MW of additional Hydro by 2030 and 3000 MW by 2040.

Cambodia had 305 MW of solar installed at the end of 2021, with seven grid-connected projects. Another 700 MW was planned or under construction. In 2025, the Minister of Mines and Energy announced 23 projects worth 5 billion dollars focused on renewables.

An analysis by the Lowy Institute highlighted significant gaps in regulation for allowing rapid installation of solar.

== Other sources ==
The leading sources of energy in Cambodia are traditional fuels like firewood. It is estimated that biofuels like firewood are still relied on by 87% of the residential sector for energy.

Although the country has partnerships with China and Russia on developing nuclear power, as of 2024, no significant investments have been made for installing nuclear capacity.

== See also ==
- List of power stations in Cambodia
- Electricity Authority of Cambodia
- Ministry of Industry, Mining and Energy (Cambodia)
- Hydropower in the Mekong River Basin
- 2013 Southern Vietnam and Cambodia blackout
