= Youth in Cambodia =

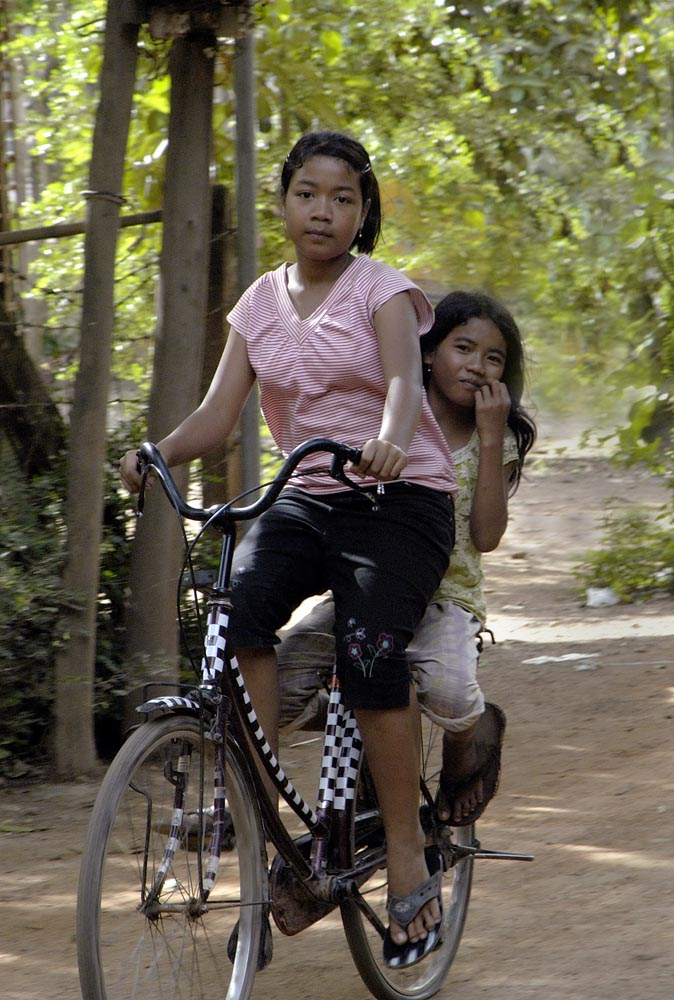
Cambodian girls on a bicycle

Youth in Cambodia (under age thirty) make up 65.3% of Cambodia's 14,805,000 people. Twenty-six percent of Cambodians are between the ages of 14 and 30 and another 30% are under 14. All of the youth in the country are second and third generation offspring of survivors of the Khmer Rouge, a genocide that occurred from 1975 to 1979. Roughly 20% of the population resides in its cities, mostly in Phnom Penh, the capital.

== Childhood to adolescence ==
A Cambodian child may be nursed until he or she is between two and four years of age. Up to the age of three or four, the child is given considerable physical affection and freedom, and there is little corporal punishment conducted in Cambodia. Children around five years of age also may be expected to help look after younger siblings and help with tasks around the home. Children's games emphasize socialization or skill rather than winning and losing.

By the time they reach the age of seven or eight, they are familiar with the society's norms of politeness, obedience, and respect toward their elders and toward Buddhist monks. The father at this time begins his permanent retreat into a relatively remote, authoritarian role. By age ten, a girl is expected to help her mother in basic household tasks; a boy knows how to care for the family's livestock and can do farm work under the supervision of older males.

Formerly, and still in some rural areas, a ceremony marked the entrance of a girl into puberty. Upon the onset of menstruation, a girl would participate in a ritual called chol mlup (entering the shadow). Certain foods were taboo at this time, and she would be isolated from her family for a period of a few days to six months. After the period of seclusion, she was considered marriageable.

In pre-communist days, parents exerted complete authority over their children until the children were married, and the parents continued to maintain some control well into the marriage. Men and women are usually married by the age of 25 and 23, respectfully. Age difference are strictly recognized, and form the structure for dynamics among different age groups. The proper polite vocabulary was used in the pre-communist period, and special generational terms for "you" continued to be used in the late 1980s. Younger speakers had to show respect to older people, including siblings, even if their ages differed by only a few minutes.

== Education ==
Adolescent children are usually segregated in school by sex, because they want this to be a place for education and not entertainment or romance. Thinking that sex education would lead to desire and trouble. The main exception to this occurs during festivals, especially the New Year Festival, when boys and girls take part in group games.

In recent years, Cambodia has experienced a rapid increase in enrolment rates in primary education with 91.3% of youth attending. However, these high enrolment rates are offset by low completion rates, 46.8%, meaning nearly half who initially enrolled, dropped out before they reached grade six. Many Cambodians see school as only preparing them for more school, which many cannot financially afford.

Between the ages of seven and nineteen, but most commonly after the eleventh birthday, a boy may become a Theravada temple servant and go on to serve a time as a novice monk. Having a son chosen for such a position is considered an honor for the parents, and earns the individual son merit.

The history of the recent genocide (1975–1979) has not been fully communicated to the future generations, partly because history books were manipulated to create support for the government in power. After the Khmer Rouge and into the 90's students were taught limited reading and writing skills, and most of their knowledge about the genocide was from first hand accounts their teachers would share with them. Because of the controlled environment in school, parents are the primary source of information on the genocide.

From 2005 to 2009 Cambodia created a “Policy for Curriculum Development” that was enacted with the intentions to include life skills in the national curriculum. They defined life skills as: intellectual, personal, interpersonal and vocational skills that enable informed decision-making, effective communication, coping and self-management skills that contribute to a healthy and productive life. In many rural areas this means a strong concentration on agricultural skills. This is in contrast to a western approach, placing the importance on critical thinking.

== Sexual reproductive health ==
Availability of education and reproductive health services to adolescents in Cambodia is lacking as health care services focus mainly on adults and small children. Most adolescents also face issues of confidentiality when trying to find healthcare. Since 1996 Reproductive Health Association of Cambodia (RHAC) has worked with community and local authorities in the area of sexual reproductive health. They are working to open communication and services in the future among all age groups.

HIV rates in Cambodia are low in comparison to most of the world. 0.49% youth age 15-24 have HIV. This is partially due to low rates of sexual activity outside of marriage. Eight percent of women have their first child between the ages of 15–19. Only 1.9% of these women in 2010 used modern contraceptives.

== Labor and employment ==
Child labor rates in Cambodia are among the highest in Southeast Asia, with some 90% of all 5–17 year old who are economically active but unpaid. 70% of child labor work in the form of agriculture. Many children and youth in Cambodia have work activities that are embedded in their daily lives by their families, and based on their larger societal status and income. This labor is often seen by outsiders as child labor or street children. Families understand this labor as beneficial to the survival, a belief reflected in state policies.

== Historical context shaping Cambodia ==
After the Khmer Rouge in 1975–1979, Cambodia had to completely rebuild their society, including how they raised their families and worked as a society. Recently in 2003 they have been working to be more independent and rely less on NGO's for money to support healthcare, education, social welfare and rural development.
