= Sport in Cambodia =

Cambodia has increasingly become involved in sports over the last 30 years.

== The ancient sport of Bokator ==
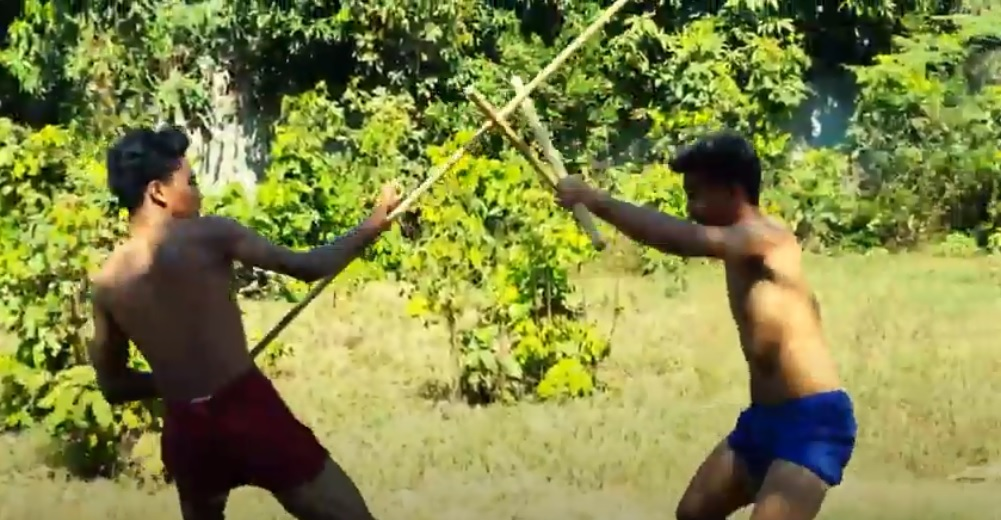
The long staff (dambong veng) and short staff(s) (dambong clei) are common weapons in Bokator and Cambodian martial arts

Bokator/Lbokator is an ancient Khmer martial art that is based on animal forms. It has ground fighting, close combat techniques and weaponry.

Unlike kickboxing, which is a sport fighting art, boxkator was a soldier's art, designed to be used on the battlefield. It can be considered a complete martial art, using strikes, throws, drags, trapping, locking, and some elements of ground fighting. Every single part of the body can be used as a weapon.

When fighting, bokator practitioners still wear the uniforms of ancient Khmer armies. A kroma (scarf) is folded around their waist and blue and red silk cords called sangvar day, are tied around the combatants head and biceps. In the past, it is said that the cords were enchanted to increase strength, although now they are just ceremonial.

The kroma shows the fighter's level of expertise. A series of grades, each taking at least five months to complete training seven days a week and two hours a day, are represented by different colors.

The first grade is white, followed by green, blue, red, brown, and then black which has 10 degrees.

After completing their initial training, fighters wear a black kroma (scarf) for at least another ten years. To attain the gold kroma, you must be a true master and must have done something great for bokator. And to become a true master, it will definitely take some time as just in the unarmed portion of the art; there are between 8,000 and 10,000 different techniques; only 1,000 of which you have to learn to attain the black kroma.

The art contains 341 different styles, some of which are the duck, crab, horse, bird, dragon, eagle, crane, wind, fire, water, earth (or stone), king monkey, lion, elephant, apsara (traditional Hindu sacred nymph), and crocodile. Ancient Khmer armies. In the past, it is said that the cords were enchanted to increase strength, although now they are just ceremonial.

Because of its visually similar style, bokator (boxkator) is commonly wrongly described as a variant of modern kickboxing. Bokator has many forms based on styles as well as straight practical fighting techniques. While pradal serey is a more simplified freestyle fighting system which uses a few of the basic (white kroma) punching, elbow, kicking, and kneeing techniques.

== Pradal Serey ==
Cambodia is famous for Pradal Serey or Kun Khmer . Pradal serey, or Traditional Khmer kickboxing, is a popular sport in Cambodia. A match consists of five sets of three-minute rounds and takes place in a 6.1 meter square boxing ring. A one- or two-minute break occurs between each round. At the beginning of each match, boxers practice the praying rituals known as the Kun Kru. Traditional Cambodian music is played during the match. The music is played using the instruments of the skor yaul (a type of drum), the sraliai (a flute like instrument), and the stringed chhing. Boxers wear leather gloves and shorts.

Rules:

- A boxer is not allowed to strike his opponent while he is on the ground.
- A boxer is not allowed to bite.
- When an opponent can not fight anymore, the referee stops the fight.
- Blows to the back of the opponent are not allowed.
- A boxer may not hold on to the ropes.
- Blows to the genitals are prohibited.

Victory can be obtained by knockout. A knockout occurs when a boxer is knocked down to the ground and can not continue fighting after a 10-second count by the referee. Victory is also obtained from the end of the match, when judges decide by a point system which fighter was more effective. If fighters end up with the same score, a draw is called.

=== History ===
The combat between Vāli and Sugrīva is depicted on the western gopura of the Banteay Srei (967 A.D.)

The Khmer Empire was founded in 802 A.D. at a time when many modern Southeast Asian countries didn't exist yet. Martial arts were used by the military of the Khmer Empire. Pradal Serey has its root from the hand to hand combat use by the military of the Khmer Empire. An early version of pradal serey was effectively used by the Khmer Empire to dominate the Southeast Asian mainland. Pradal serey became a sport, during the days of the Colonial Cambodia. When the French came, they added western boxing gloves, weight classes, timed rounds, and a boxing ring to civilize the art. Originally matches were fought in dirt pits with limited rules while hands were wrapped in rope.

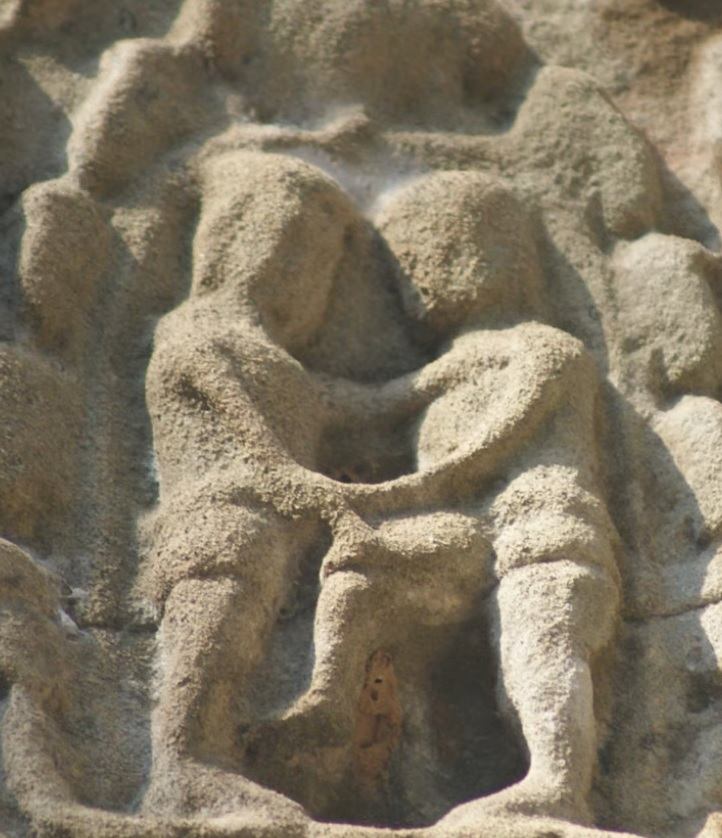
Carving from the 12th century Ta Prohm temple depicting two men clinch fighting and a knee strike.

==== The Near Extinction of Pradal Serey ====
On April 17, 1975, during the chaos of the Vietnam War, the Khmer Rouge overthrew Lon Nol's pro-Western government, which was crumbling after America left the Vietnam War. The Khmer Rouge's plan was to eliminate modern society and create an agrarian utopia. The Khmer Rouge executed most educated people, people who had ties to the old government, and anyone who was believed to be a threat (doctors, teachers, soldiers, actors, singers, etc.), and restricted the remaining Cambodian population to what were effectively labor camps.

Pradal serey was banned under the Khmer Rouge regime, and many boxers were executed, nearly causing the art to be wiped out. In January 1979, the Vietnamese, along with a token force of Khmers led by ex-Khmer Rouge officers, overthrew the Khmer Rouge. Thereafter pradal serey was gradually revived.

==== Pradal Serey Today ====
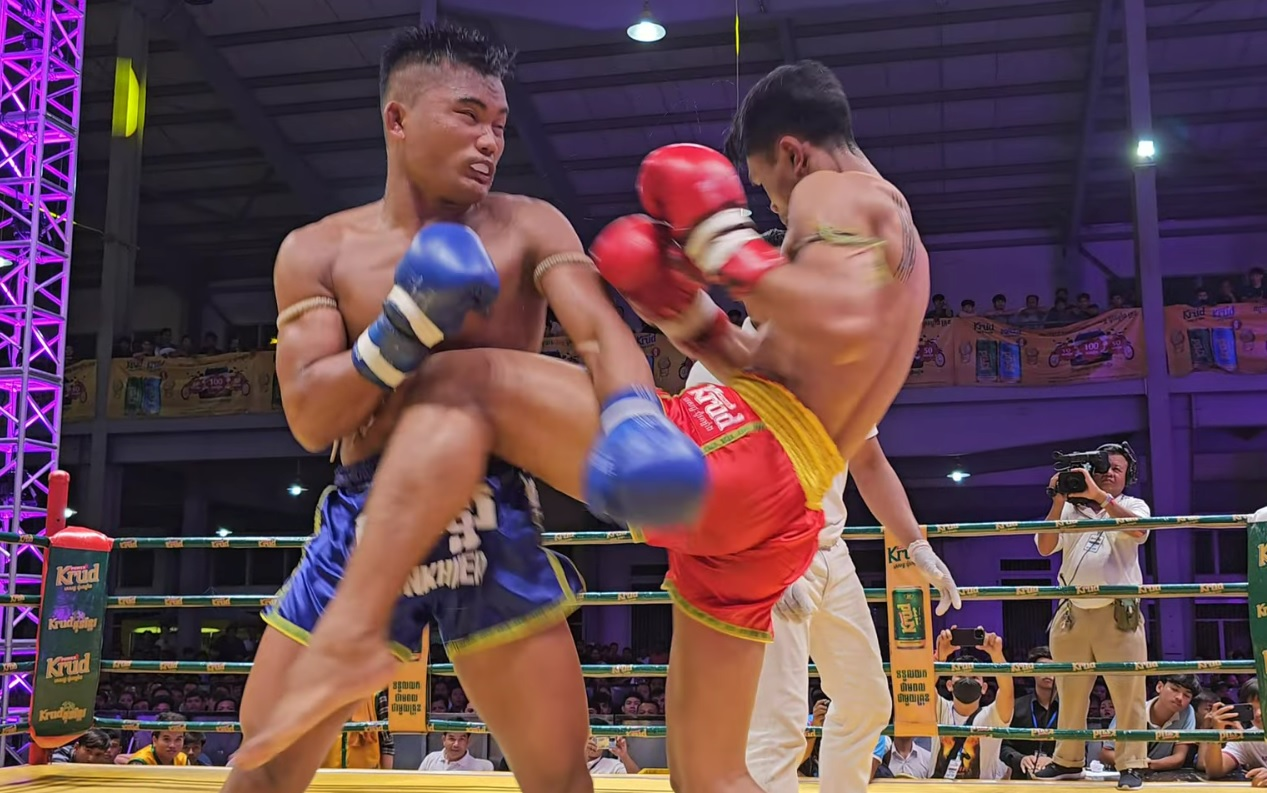
A knee strike in pradal serey match in Cambodia.

Pradal serey is making a strong comeback since its banishment back in the 1970s. Numerous gyms have opened and large masses of students, local and foreign, have come to train in Cambodia. There are weekly matches held, in which many are televised, and many of Cambodia's best have traveled internationally to compete. There are currently about 70 boxing clubs.

== Khmer boxers ==
- Eh Phuthong - Khmer Kickboxing Champion
- Oth Phouthoung - TV5 kickboxing champion
- Meas Chanta - International Khmer Kickboxer
- Pich Arun - International Khmer Kickboxer
- Pich Sophann - International Khmer Kickboxer
- Chey Kosal - International Khmer Kickboxer
- Chan Rothana - International Khmer Kickboxer - Yuthakun Khmer Master
- Try Kuntor - Cambodian Kickboxer
- Bing Leung - Cambodian Kickboxer
- Thoeun Theara - IPCC Champion
- Lao Chantrea - Kubota Champion
- Chhoeung Lvai - IPCC Champion

== Khmer traditional wrestling ==
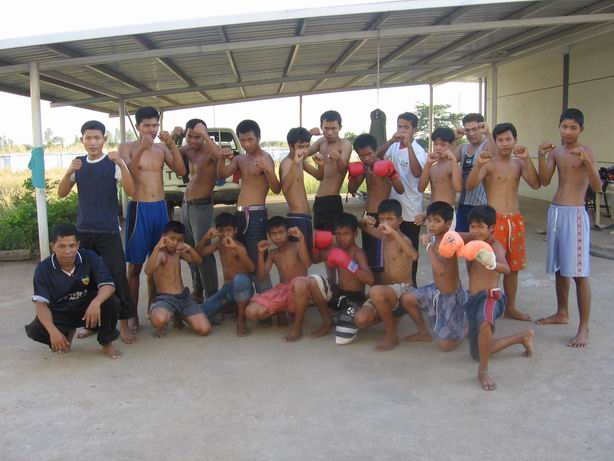
Cambodian martial artists

A Khmer traditional wrestling match consists of three rounds. A round may be won by forcing an opponent to his back. A wrestler wins the match by winning two of the three rounds. After each round, the loser is asked if he wishes to continue with the match.

Wrestlers participate in pre-match ritual dancing before the match. The match is accompanied by the music of two drums (called Skor Ngey and Chhmol, "female drum" and "male drum").

Traditional matches are held during the Khmer New Year and other Cambodian holidays.

== Football ==
The Cambodian Football Federation is the governing body of football in Cambodia, controlling the Cambodian national football team as well as running the Cambodian League.

It was founded in 1933, and has been a member of FIFA since 1953, and the Asian Football Confederation (AFC) since 1957.

Phnom Penh Olympic Stadium is the national stadium, with a capacity of 48,529 to 70,000. Morodok Techo National Sports Complex, a new modern multipurpose and international standard sports facility, is being constructed in Chroy Jong Va District, Phnom Penh, Cambodia and set to host the 2023 Southeast Asian Games.

== Basketball ==
The Cambodian Basketball League or CBL is the official Basketball League of Cambodia. It was founded in 2013. The top basketball players and teams from Cambodia compete for the CBL title every year at the Beeline Arena.

== Ox cart racing ==
Ox cart racing is a sport in Cambodia that takes place during the Khmer New Year. It is done to preserve Cambodian culture.

== Pétanque ==
Pétanque is one of the more popular sports in Cambodia. It was brought to Cambodia by the French. It is administered by the Cambodian Boules and Pétanque Federation. In 2019, 327 pétanque athletes from 25 provinces competed in the Natiaonal Pétanque Championships.

== Sepak takraw ==
Sepak takraw is a "kick-volleyball" sport, that is popular in Southeast Asia. It may also be known as si or chinlon in Cambodia. This sport is featured in the Southeast Asian Games.

== Skateboarding ==
Skateboaring is an emerging sport in Cambodia. It started to emerge around 2010. The first skating shop opened in the country was "The Skate Shop". The NGO Skateistan opened in Cambodia in 2011. In 2013, Tony Hawk visited Cambodia to promote skateboarding via Skateistan. In 2019, the Cambodia Skateboard and Roller Sports Federation was formed.

== Traditional boat racing ==
Traditional boat racing is a popular sport in Cambodia. Competition usually take place during the water festival. Boats are usually long and contain large numbers of rowers.

== Sports facilities ==
- Beeline Arena owned by Banzai

There is a new indoor stadium in Phnom Penh, the Beeline Arena. Located at Sangkat Chroy Changvar, Khan Russei Keo. The arena was built to international standards. It is the first multi-purpose sports arena in Cambodia with international standard, including: - Multi-sports surface for futsal, basketball, volleyball and more - 2,000 person capacity - VIP lounge and restaurant - Sports, music, cultural and big screen events. Rental available.

- The first marina in Cambodia for all boaters, sailing and motor yachts.

In October 2013 in the harbor of the port of Sihanoukville opened the first in the history of Cambodia marina Oceania . Marina is located on the harbor breakwater island of Koh Preab (Koh Prib).

== See also ==
- Cambodia at the Olympics
