= Economic history of Cambodia =

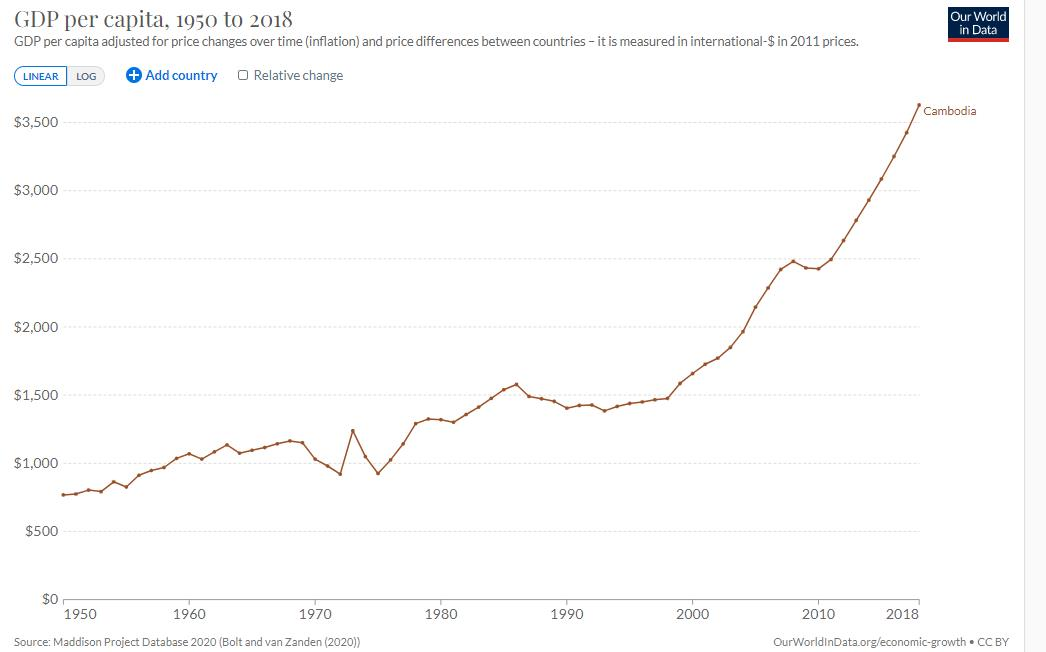
Real GPD per capita development of Cambodia

Cambodia was a farming area in the first and second millennia BC. States in the area engaged in trade in the Indian Ocean and exported rice surpluses. Complex irrigation systems were built in the 9th century. The French colonial period left the large feudal landholdings intact. Roads and a railway were built, and rubber, rice and corn grown. After independence Sihanouk pursued a policy of economic independence, securing aid and investment from a number of countries.

Bombing and other effects of the war during the Vietnam War damaged rice production. Lon Nol had a policy of liberalising the economy. This was followed by the victory of the Khmer Rouge and the emptying of the cities. After the defeat of the Khmer Rouge, a Five Year Plan was adopted, aiming to improve agriculture, industry and distribution, with a slogan of "export and thrift". Today, Cambodia remains a largely agricultural economy and industrial development is slow.

== Pre-colonial economy ==
Cambodia is not a mixed economy. Parts of the region now called Cambodia were inhabited during the first and second millennia BCE by a Neolithic culture that may have migrated from southeastern China to the Indochinese Peninsula. From 2000 BCE Cambodians started to domesticate animals and started growing rice. By 600 BCE, Cambodians were making iron tools. By the 1st century CE the inhabitants had developed relatively stable and organized societies. The most advanced groups lived along the coast and in the lower Mekong valley and delta regions where they cultivated rice and kept domesticated animals. They worked metals, including iron and bronze, and possessed navigational skills.

Influences from India came from about 100 BCE, as a consequence of increasing trade in the Indian Ocean. Funan, the earliest of the Indianized states, was founded in the 1st century CE, in the Mekong delta. The population was probably concentrated in villages along the Mekong and the Tonlé Sap River below the Tonlé Sap. Traffic and communications were mostly waterborne on the rivers and their delta arms. The area was a natural region for the development of an economy based on fishing and rice cultivation.

There is considerable evidence that the Funanese economy depended on rice surpluses produced by an extensive inland irrigation system. Maritime trade played an important role in the development of Funan, and the remains of what is believed to have been the kingdom's main port, Óc Eo (now part of Vietnam), contain Roman as well as Persian, Indian, and Greek artifacts.

By the 5th century, the state exercised control over the lower Mekong and the lands around the Tonle Sap. It commanded tribute from smaller states in the area now comprising northern Cambodia, southern Laos, southern Thailand, and the northern portion of the Malay Peninsula. Indianization was fostered by increasing contact with the subcontinent through the travels of merchants, diplomats, and learned Brahmins.

Beginning in the early 6th century, civil wars and dynastic strife undermined Funan's stability. Funan disappears from history in the 7th century. The successor state, Chenla, is first mentioned in the Chinese Sui History as a Funan vassal. In the 8th century factional disputes at the Chenla court resulted in the splitting of the kingdom into rival northern and southern halves known as Land (or Upper) Chenla and Water (or Lower) Chenla. Land Chenla maintained a relatively stable existence, but Water Chenla underwent a period of constant turbulence, partly because of attacks from the sea by the Javanese and others.

The Angkorian period or Khmer Empire lasted from the early 9th century to the early 15th century and was the golden age of Khmer civilization. Indravarman I (877–889) extended Khmer control as far west as the Korat Plateau in Thailand, and ordered the construction of a huge reservoir north of the capital to provide irrigation for wet rice cultivation. His son, Yasovarman I (889 - 900), built the Eastern Baray reservoir. Its dikes, which may be seen today, are more than 6 kilometers long and 1.6 kilometers wide. The elaborate system of canals and reservoirs built under Indravarman I and his successors were the key to Kambuja's prosperity for half a millennium.

By freeing cultivators from dependence on unreliable seasonal monsoons, they made possible an early "green revolution" that provided the country with large surpluses of rice. Kambuja's decline during the thirteenth and fourteenth centuries probably was hastened by the deterioration of the irrigation system. Attacks by Thai and other foreign peoples and the internal discord caused by dynastic rivalries diverted human resources from the system's upkeep, and it gradually fell into disrepair.

Angkorian society was strictly hierarchical. The king, regarded as divine, owned both the land and his subjects. Immediately below the monarch and the royal family were the Brahman priesthood and a small class of officials, who numbered about 4,000 in the tenth century. Next were the commoners, who were burdened with heavy corvée (forced labor) duties. There was also a large slave class who built the enduring monuments.

After Jayavarman VII's death, Kambuja entered a long period of decline that led to its eventual disintegration. The Thai were a growing menace on the empire's western borders.

== Colonial economy ==
Aside from collecting taxes more efficiently, the French did little to transform Cambodia's village-based economy. Cambodians paid the highest taxes per capita in Indochina, and in 1916 a nonviolent tax revolt brought tens of thousands of peasants into Phnom Penh to petition the king for a reduction. The incident shocked the French, who had lulled themselves into believing that the Cambodians were too indolent and individualistic to organize a mass protest. Taxes continued to be sorely resented by the Cambodians. In 1925 villagers killed a French resident after he threatened to arrest tax delinquents. For poor peasants, the corvée service (a tax substitute) of as many as ninety days a year on public works projects, was an onerous duty.

According to Hou Yuon (a veteran of the communist movement who was murdered by the Khmer Rouge after they seized power in 1975), usury vied with taxes as the chief burden upon the peasantry. Hou's 1955 doctoral thesis at the University of Paris was one of the earliest and most thorough studies of conditions in the rural areas during the French colonial era. He argued that although most landholdings were small (one to five hectares), poor and middle-class peasants were victims of flagrantly usurious practices that included effective interest rates of 100 to 200 percent. Foreclosure reduced them to the status of sharecroppers or landless laborers.

Although debt slavery and feudal landholding patterns had been abolished by the French, the old elites still controlled the countryside. According to Hou, "the great feudal farms, because of their precapitalist character, are disguised as small and mediumsized farms, in the form of tenancies and share-farms, and materially are indistinguishable from other small and medium-seized farms." Whether or not the countryside was as polarized in terms of class (or property) as Hou argues is open to debate, but it is clear that great tension and conflict existed despite the smiles and the easygoing manner of Khmer villagers.

To develop the economic infrastructure, the French built a limited number of roads and a railroad that extended from Phnom Penh through Battambang to the Thai border. The cultivation of rubber and of corn were economically important, and the former was a response to the high market demand. This shift to producing commodities transformed the economy. Production techniques changed as a response to the need of more intensive factor inputs. The prosperous 1920s, when rubber, rice, and corn were in demand overseas, were years of considerable economic growth, but the world depression after 1929 caused great suffering, especially among rice cultivators whose falling incomes made them more than ever the victims of moneylenders.

Industry was rudimentary and was designed primarily to process raw materials such as rubber for local use or export. There was considerable immigration, which created a plural society similar to those of other Southeast Asian countries. As in British Burma and British Malaya, foreigners dominated the developed sectors of the economy. Vietnamese people came to serve as laborers on rubber plantations and as clerical workers in the government. As their numbers increased, Vietnamese immigrants also began to play important roles in the economy as fishermen and as operators of small businesses.

Chinese people had been in Cambodia for several centuries before the imposition of French rule, and they had dominated precolonial commerce. This arrangement continued under the French, because the colonial government placed no restrictions on the occupations in which they could engage. Chinese merchants and bankers in Cambodia developed commercial networks that extended throughout Indochina as well as overseas to other parts of Southeast Asia and to mainland China.

== Economic developments after independence ==
The predominance of agriculture and the lack—or neglect—of real industrial development have characterized Cambodia's modern economy since independence in 1953. Wet rice cultivation traditionally has played a key role in peasant subsistence, in national self-sufficiency in food production, in trade relations with other states, and in governmental revenues for national development. Conversely, the government has made few attempts to industrialize the nation, acquiesced to a pragmatic combination of socialism and small-scale capitalism, and the country achieved some limited rehabilitative goals.

Cambodia's economy struggled to keep up with other countries in Southeast Asia due to the problems in developing its human and physical infrastructure. This is indicated by a relatively low exports per capita level. In the late 1980s, government policies fundamentally relied upon the nation's own sparse resources—chiefly agriculture, a nascent industrial base, and modest foreign aid from Comecon countries and nongovernmental international organizations. The level of exports per capita only started to increase after the 1980s.

=== Sihanouk's peacetime economy (1953–1970) ===
Sihanouk's political neutrality, which formed the cornerstone of his foreign policy, had a significant effect on Cambodia's economic development. Sihanouk insisted that the economic dimension of neutrality meant either total rejection of international aid (as practiced by Burma under Ne Win) or acceptance of foreign economic assistance from all countries without strings attached. Indeed, during the first decade that he was in power in newly independent Cambodia (1953–63), the prince carefully practiced his "purer form of neutrality between East and West" in seeking foreign economic assistance for development (see Cambodia under Sihanouk, 1954–70, ch. 1).

In 1963 however, Cambodia's economy started to stagnate when Sihanouk decided to link his economic neutrality policy to the country's territorial integrity and border security. He rejected further assistance from the United States, because Washington supported the Republic of Vietnam (South Vietnam), and from Thailand, with which Cambodia had continuous frontier disputes. In a related move, Sihanouk nationalized trading companies, banks, insurance, and major industries, thereby causing economic deterioration between 1963 and 1969.

The 1967 Samlot (Batdambang) revolt and the February 1970 government decision to demonetize (or exchange) the old 500 riel (for value of the riel—see Glossary) banknotes were crucial events contributing to the end of the Sihanouk era (see Into the Maelstrom: Insurrection and War, 1967–75, ch. 1; The Second Indochina War, 1954–75, ch. 5).

During his tenure after independence, Sihanouk used the country's ill-defined constitution to monitor all government activities of any consequence and to bend the government's decision-making process to his advantage. During the course of nation building, political aims often prevailed over strictly economic objectives. For example, prior to 1967, the government assigned higher priority to social improvements, such as health and education, than it did to national economic growth. The government later gave higher priority to the productive sectors of agriculture and industry in economic plans for the 1968-72 periods; however, because of war, the government did not implement these plans.

Nonetheless, between 1952 and 1969, Cambodia's gross national product (GNP—see Glossary) grew an average of 5 percent a year in real terms, with growth higher during the 1950s than during the 1960s. In addition, the service sector played an important role in Sihanouk's mixed economic system in contrast to its position under the regimes of Pol Pot and of Heng Samrin, who considered the service sector insignificant and "unproductive." In 1968 the service sector accounted for more than 15 percent of gross domestic product (GDP—see Glossary), agriculture accounted for 36 percent, and manufacturing for 12 percent.

Agriculture developed under a degree of paternalism from Sihanouk, who donated farm equipment to various villages and, in return, received respect and affection from the peasants. In general, however, Cambodian agriculture subsisted without much help from the government. In 1969 approximately 80 percent of rice farmers owned the land they cultivated, and the landholding for each family averaged slightly more than two hectares. The farmers used simple and rudimentary implements that were well suited to their needs and to the light weight of their draft animals. Overall, the peasants were remarkably self-sufficient.

Farmers began to cultivate more land, causing rice production to increase from an average of 1.4 million tons in 1955 to 2.4 million tons in 1960. Production remained at that level throughout the 1960s. Rice yield per hectare, however, remained low—less than 1.2 tons per hectare—during the 1952-69 period little was done to increase yield through the use of irrigation, chemical fertilizers, or improved seeds and implements. Average yields in Batdambang and Kampong Cham provinces were 50 percent higher than the national average because of better soil fertility and, in the case of Batdambang, larger average landholdings and greater use of machines in cultivation.

As an important rice exporter, Cambodia suffered notably from the nationalization of the trade sector in 1963. A significant part of the national rice production (maybe as high as two thirds) was smuggled to Vietnam. As rice exports had been a major source of revenue for the state, the losses for the government's coffers were drastic. The king had to slash the budgets of a number of ministries, leading, in turn, to much discontent among civil servants and, notably, the military.

Industrial and infrastructural development benefited from foreign economic assistance. In general, the government avoided ambitious plans and focused on small enterprises to meet local needs and to reduce foreign imports. In June 1956, the Chinese provided Phnom Penh with US$22.4 million in equipment as part of an ongoing program of industrial economic assistance. In addition, they helped build a textile mill and a glass plant in the 1960s.

During this period, other nations contributed through aid programs of their own. Czechoslovakia granted loans for the construction of tractor assembly plants, tire-production facilities, and a sugar refinery. Other aid donors were the Soviet Union, Yugoslavia, France, the Federal Republic of Germany (West Germany), Japan, and Australia. United States economic assistance to Cambodia amounted to more than US$350 million for the 1955 to 1962 period, and it was invested mostly in the areas of public health, education, and agricultural development.

To avoid the appearance of undue dependence upon foreign aid, Cambodia insisted upon "project sharing," that is, participation of its own in specific enterprises, such as the French-sponsored oil refinery and truck assembly plant at Sihanoukville. This stipulation imposed by Phnom Penh also had the effect of holding down the scale of many aid projects and the amounts of loans extended to the Cambodian government.

The government also used foreign assistance to expand the country's transportation and communication networks. France helped to develop Sihanoukville, Cambodia's second largest port, which opened in 1960, and the United States constructed a highway linking the port to Phnom Penh. In addition, the Cambodians, with French and West German assistance, built a railway from Sihanoukville to the capital.

Despite Sihanouk's claims of economic progress, Cambodia's industrial output in 1968 amounted to only 12 percent of GNP, or only one-third of agricultural production. Rice and rubber were the country's two principal commodity exports and foreign-exchange earners during the Sihanouk era.

=== Wartime economy (1970–1975) ===
The war that engulfed the rest of Indochina spread to Cambodia in April 1970, shortly after the coup that deposed Prince Sihanouk. Wartime conditions had a major impact on the country's economy, especially on the export sector. Production and export of virtually all commodities dropped sharply, as insecurity spread throughout the countryside. Intense combat in the nation's most densely populated farming areas caused a large segment of the peasant population to flee to cities and to towns.

By 1975 the population of Phnom Penh had swollen to 2 million, from just 50,000 in 1955. Moreover, the war seriously dislocated the economic system. Food shortages arose as insurgents interrupted the transportation of crops from the countryside to the main marketing centers. Increasing budgetary expenditures, skyrocketing inflation, shrinking export earnings, and a rising balance-of-payments deficit plagued the war-torn economy.

The war's most damaging effect was on rice production. In 1972 Cambodia needed to import rice (from Japan and from Thailand) for the first time since independence. Fighting reduced the amount of land under rice cultivation to fewer than 800,000 hectares in 1972, far less than the approximately 3 million hectares that had been under cultivation in 1969. The 1972 rice harvest amounted to only 26.8 percent of the 1969 harvest. Exports of natural rubber, the country's second leading foreign-exchange earner, ceased shortly after hostilities began in 1970. The war destroyed extensive rubber plantations and damaged rubber-processing facilities.

In late 1970, Lon Nol, who succeeded Sihanouk, continued to liberalize the economy in an effort to save the country from economic disaster. This endeavor was a continuation of the policies he had enacted as head of the government of "national salvation" in August 1969. Under Lon Nol's direction, Phnom Penh limited the control and the authority of the state export-import agency (Société nationale d'exportation et d'importation—SONEXIM), which had been established in 1964 to administer foreign trade, to denationalize banks and industries, to encourage private foreign investments, and to allow greater private participation in the economy. The new economic policies of the Khmer Republic gradually reversed the pattern of state socialism that had formed the keystone of Sihanouk's domestic policies.

On October 29, 1971, the government implemented a comprehensive program of reforms to stabilize the economy. These reforms included increased import taxes on all nonessential commodities; increased interest rates on bank deposits and on commercial loans; elimination of credit to state enterprises and to public utilities; introduction of a flexible currency exchange system; and simplification of the import system to facilitate the movement of goods. The emphasis of the program was to restore monetary stability in the face of rising inflation, financial speculation, black markets, and other economic problems caused by the war. In a change of policy, the government also moved toward greater involvement with international and with regional organizations and sought support from the World Bank (see Glossary), the International Monetary Fund (see Glossary), and the Asian Development Bank.

As the war progressed, Lon Nol's government aimed major economic measures mainly at improving the overall food supply situation and at maintaining public confidence in the continued availability of essential consumer items. To ensure adequate domestic supplies, in November 1971 Phnom Penh suspended grants of export licenses for major export commodities, such as rice, corn, and cattle. Although the move helped maintain stocks of essential commodities in the capital and in provincial centers, supplies were small relative to demand.

The Lon Nol government had earlier declared in principle that it maintained a policy of "strict neutrality" and would accept foreign assistance from "all countries which love peace and justice." As early as April 20, 1970, Cambodia formally requested military and economic aid from Washington to help cope with growing war expenditures and with an increasing budgetary deficit. As military activity in the country intensified, the United States became Cambodia's largest donor and supplier.

Moscow sent medical equipment and, in October 1971, the Soviets renewed a financial agreement with the republican regime. The Economic Support Fund, to which the United Nations (UN), the United States, Britain, Japan, New Zealand, Thailand, and Malaysia pledged their contributions, provided US$21 million in auxiliary relief. Other nations, including Italy, Israel, West Germany, and Switzerland, provided funds mostly to assist war victims. France earmarked its aid for the maintenance of French educational programs and cultural institutions. Nevertheless, these palliative measures fell far short of what was needed. By 1975 the economy had collapsed, and the country was surviving mainly on imported food financed by the United States government.

== Under the Khmer Rouge (1975–1979) ==
Under the leadership of the Khmer Rouge, Cambodia underwent a brutal and radical revolution. When the communist forces took power in Phnom Penh in April 1975, their immediate goals were to overhaul the social system and to revitalize the national economy. The economic development strategy of the Khmer Rouge was to build a strong agricultural base supported by local small industries and handicrafts. As explained by Deputy Premier Ieng Sary, the regime was "pursuing radical transformation of the country, with agriculture as the base. With revenues from agriculture we are building industry which is to serve the development of agriculture."

This strategy was also the focus of a doctoral thesis written by future Khmer Rouge leader Khieu Samphan at the University of Paris in 1959. Samphan argued that Cambodia could only achieve economic and industrial development by increasing and expanding agricultural production. The new communist government implemented the tenets of this thesis; it called for a total collectivization of agriculture and for a complete nationalization of all sectors of the economy.

Strict adherence to the principle of self-reliance constituted the central goal of the Khmer Rouge regime. A Phnom Penh radio broadcast in early May (about a month after the Khmer Rouge arrived in the capital) underscored the importance of Cambodian self- reliance and boasted that during the war the Khmer Rouge had used scrap iron and wrecked military vehicles to manufacture their own bullets and mines. The statement made it clear that the policy of self-reliance would continue in peacetime.

In another move aimed at reducing foreign influence on the country, the regime announced on May 10 that it would not allow foreigners to remain in Cambodia but that the measure was only temporary; and it added, "We shall reconsider the question [of allowing foreigners to enter the country] after the re-establishment of diplomatic, economic and commercial relations with other countries." Although Cambodia resumed diplomatic relations with a number of nations, the new government informed the UN General Assembly on October 6, 1975, that it was neutral and economically self-sufficient and would not ask for aid from any country.

On September 9, however, the Chinese ambassador arrived in Cambodia, and there were soon reports that China was providing aid to the Khmer Rouge. Estimates of the number of Chinese experts in Cambodia after that time ranged from 500 to 2,000. The policy of self-reliance also meant that the government organized the entire population into forced-labor groups to work in paddies and on other land to help the country reach its goal of food self-sufficiency.

The Khmer Rouge, as soon as it took power on April 17, 1975, emptied Phnom Penh (of its approximately 2 million residents) as well as other cities and towns, and forced the people into the countryside. This overnight evacuation was motivated by the urgent need to rebuild the country's war-torn economy and by the Khmer Rouge peasantry's hostility toward the cities. According to a Khmer Rouge spokesman at the French embassy on May 10, the evacuation was necessary to "revolutionize" and to "purify" the urban residents and to annihilate Phnom Penh, which "Cambodian peasants regarded as a satellite of foreigners, first French, and then American, and which has been built with their sweat without bringing them anything in exchange." The only people who were not ordered to leave the city were those who operated essential public services, such as water and electricity.

Other Khmer Rouge leaders rationalized the evacuation as a matter of self-reliance. They told the Swedish ambassador in early 1976 that "they didn't have any transportation facilities to bring food to the people, and so the logical thing was to bring the people to the food, i.e., to evacuate them all and make them get out into the ricefields." Indeed, when the evacuees reached their destinations, they were immediately mobilized to clear land, to harvest rice crops, to dig and restore irrigation canals, and to build and repair dikes in preparation for the further expansion of agriculture. The rice crop in November 1976 was reported to be good in relation to earlier years. At the same time, plantations producing cotton, rubber, and bananas were established or rehabilitated.

While the Khmer Rouge gave high priority to agriculture, it neglected industry. Pol Pot sought "to consolidate and perfect [existing] factories," rather than to build new ones. About 100 factories and workshops were put back into production; most of them (except a Chinese-built cement plant, a gunnysack factory, and textile mills in Phnom Penh and in Batdambang) were repair and handicraft shops revived to facilitate agricultural development.

Cambodia's economic revolution was much more radical and ambitious than that in any other communist country. In fact, Khmer Rouge leader Premier Ieng Sary explained that Cambodia wanted "to create something that never was before in history. No model exists for what we are building. We are not imitating either the Chinese or the Vietnamese model." The state or cooperatives owned all land; there were no private plots as in China or in the Soviet Union. The constitution, adopted in December 1975 and proclaimed in January 1976, specifically stated that the means of production were the collective property of the state (see Democratic Kampuchea, 1975–78, ch. 1).

The Cambodian economic system was unique in at least two respects. First, the government abolished private ownership of land. The Khmer Rouge believed that, under the new government, Cambodia should be a classless society of "perfect harmony" and that private ownership was "the source of egoist feelings and consequently social injustices." Second, Cambodia was a cashless nation; the government confiscated all republican era currency. Shops closed, and workers received their pay in the form of food rations, because there was no money in circulation.

On August 12, 1975, fewer than four months after the Khmer Rouge had taken power, Khieu Samphan claimed that, within a year or two, Cambodia would have sufficient food supplies and would be able to export some of its products. To achieve this goal in record time, large communes comprising several villages replaced village cooperatives, which had formed in the areas controlled by the Khmer Rouge in 1973 and which had spread throughout the country by 1975. Unlike China and Vietnam, which had introduced collectivization gradually over several years, Cambodia imposed the system hastily and without preparation.

The Khmer Rouge, in line with the slogan, "If we have dikes, we will have water; if we have water, we will have rice; if we have rice, we can have absolutely everything," organized the workers into three "forces." The first force comprised unmarried men (ages fifteen to forty) who were assigned to construct canals, dikes, and dams. The second force consisted of married men and women who were responsible for growing rice near villages. The third force was made up of people forty years of age and older who were assigned to less arduous tasks, such as weaving, basket-making, or watching over the children. Children under the age of fifteen grew vegetables or raised poultry. Everyone had to work between ten and twelve hours a day, and some worked even more, often under adverse, unhealthy conditions.

On September 27, 1977, in a major speech celebrating the anniversary of the Kampuchean (or Khmer) Communist Party (KCP—see Appendix B), Khmer Rouge leader Pol Pot asserted that, "Our entire people, our entire revolutionary army and all our cadres live under a collective regime through a communal support system." He then listed the government's achievements in rebuilding the economy and concluded that, "Though not yet to the point of affluence, our people's standard of living has reached a level at which people are basically assured of all needs in all fields."

Measuring the economic performance of the Khmer Rouge regime was impossible because statistics were not available, and no monetary transactions or bookkeeping were carried out. The economic life described by foreign diplomats, by Western visitors, and by Cambodian refugees in Thai camps ranged from spartan to dismal. Phnom Penh became a ghost town of only about 10,000 people. There were no shops, post offices, telephones, or telegraph services. Frequent shortages of water and of electricity occurred in all urban areas, and the government prohibited movement across provincial borders, except for that of trucks distributing rice and fuel.

Conditions in the cooperatives varied considerably from place to place. In some areas, cooperative members had permission to cultivate private plots of land and to keep livestock. In others, all property was held communally. Conditions were most primitive in the new economic zones, where city dwellers had been sent to farm virgin soil and where thousands of families lived in improvised barracks (see Democratic Kampuchea, 1975–78, ch. 1).

Cambodia made progress in improving the country's irrigation network and in expanding its rice cultivation area. Phnom Penh radio claimed that a network of ditches, canals, and reservoirs had been constructed throughout the country "like giant checkerboards, a phenomenon unprecedented in the history of our Cambodia." Still, rice production and distribution were reported to be unsatisfactory. Rice harvests were poor in 1975 and 1978, when the worst floods in seventy years struck the Mekong Valley.

Even after the better harvests of 1976 and 1977 rice distribution was unequal, and the government failed to reach the daily ration of 570 grams per person. The daily ration of rice per person varied by region from 250 to 500 grams. Party leaders, cadres, soldiers, and factory workers ate well, but children, the sick, and the elderly suffered from malnutrition and starvation. There also were reports that the government was stockpiling rice in preparation for war with Vietnam and exporting it to China in exchange for military supplies. This diverted rice could have been one explanation for the people's meager rice ration.

According to François Ponchaud's book Cambodia: Year Zero, "Ever since 1972, the guerrilla fighters had been sending all the inhabitants of the villages and towns they occupied into the forest to live and often burning their homes, so that they would have nothing to come back to." The Khmer Rouge systematically destroyed food sources that could not be easily subjected to centralized storage and control, cut down fruit trees, forbade fishing, outlawed the planting or harvest of mountain leap rice, abolished medicine and hospitals, forced people to march long distances without access to water, exported food, embarked on foolish economic projects, and refused offers of humanitarian aid, which caused a humanitarian catastrophe: hundreds of thousands died of starvation and brutal government-inflicted overwork in the countryside. To the Khmer Rouge, outside aid went against their principle of national self-reliance.

According to Solomon Bashi, the Khmer Rouge exported 150,000 tons of rice in 1976 alone. In addition, "Coop chiefs often reported better yields to their supervisors than they had actually achieved. The coop was then taxed on the rice it reportedly produced. Rice was taken out of the people's mouths and given to the Center to make up for these inflated numbers....'There were piles of rice as big as a house, but they took it away in trucks. We raised chicken and ducks and vegetables and fruit, but they took it all. You'd be killed if you tried to take anything for yourself.'" According to Henri Locard, "the reputation of KR leaders for Spartan austerity is somewhat overdone. After all, they had the entire property of all expelled town dwellers at their full disposal, and they never suffered from malnutrition."

At the end of 1978, when Vietnamese troops invaded Cambodia, the ensuing turbulence completely disrupted the nation's economic activity, particularly in the countryside, which once again became a war theater traversed by a massive population movement. Agricultural production was again a major casualty, with the result that there was a severe food crisis in 1979.

== Economic role of the Kampuchean People's Revolutionary Party ==
After the fall of Pol Pot and the establishment of the People's Republic of Kampuchea in January 1979, the Kampuchean (or Khmer) People's Revolutionary Party (KPRP—see Appendix B), led by General Secretary Heng Samrin, set Cambodia's economic development policies. Party congresses adopted these policies at meetings in January 1979, May 1981, and October 1985. A new Constitution, which the National Assembly approved in June 1981, defined Cambodia's new socialist direction and the role of the state in economic affairs. Then, after six more years of struggling with an economy of survival and subsistence, KPRP leaders presented their First Plan, which represented a systematic and rational party effort at centrally planning and improving the economy.

=== New economic policy and system ===
In contrast to Pol Pot's radical, doctrinaire approach to economic development, Heng Samrin and the leaders of the Kampuchean (or Khmer) National United Front for National Salvation (KNUFNS—see Appendix B), the umbrella group of anti-Pol Pot forces sponsored by Hanoi, sought to rally public support by formulating a policy that would be pragmatic, realistic, and flexible. In an eleven-point program promulgated shortly before the Vietnamese invasion of Cambodia, the front articulated the economic guidelines that would mark its tenure in power. These guidelines advocated a gradual transformation to socialism; a "planned economy with markets"; the restoration of banks, of currency, and of trade; the abolition of forced labor; the introduction of an eight-hour workday; and pay based on work performed.

The KPRP socialist economy accepted the private sector. At a May 1980 agriculture conference, Samrin reviewed the effectiveness of the solidarity groups (krom samaki), production units of seven to fifteen families, united in a common endeavor to raise food or to produce goods. These production units had been organized in line with the policy of moving toward socialism. He affirmed that each member of these groups would receive at least one hectare of land to cultivate for communal purposes, plus a private plot not exceeding a quarter of a hectare on which to grow vegetables or to graze livestock. Also, a July 1980 planning conference called for a policy of "simultaneous development of family (private) economy and national (socialized) economy." The conference also decided that the state should buy agricultural products from the peasants and should sell them manufactured goods at free-market prices.

The KPRP further clarified its economic policy at its Fourth Party Congress (its first since taking power in Phnom Penh) from May 26 to May 29, 1981. It declared that the nation's economic system had three main parts—the state economy, the collective economy, and the family economy, and that each of these parts "had its own significant role."

The state economy covered large-scale agricultural production, all industrial production, the communications and transportation networks, finance, and domestic and foreign trade. To facilitate economic transactions nationwide, the state restored the banking system in November 1979, and it reintroduced currency in March 1980. The KPRP acknowledged that the state economy was small and said that it should be expanded. The party leaders, however, aware of the pitfalls of central planning, warned against "over-expansion and disregard for real needs, production conditions, management ability, and economic capability."

The collective economy—the largest of the three elements—was assigned an important role in agricultural rehabilitation and development. It consisted of solidarity groups in agriculture, fishing, forestry, and handicrafts. These groups also assumed the task of collective purchase and sale.

The family-run economy included the home economies of the peasants, most retail businesses, individual artisans, handicrafts, repair shops, and small trade. Although the 1981 Constitution stated that the land and other natural resources were state property, it gave the citizens usufruct rights to land allotted for a house and garden by the state. In some cases, agricultural workers were also allowed to borrow an extra plot of land from the state, to produce food on it, and to keep the harvest for their own consumption.

Private enterprise also made a modest beginning under Cambodia's hybrid economic system. Citizens were allowed to buy and to sell agricultural produce and handicrafts. The law guaranteed workers the right to keep their wages, their other income and their property. Encouraged and protected by the state, hundreds of small shops and factories, each employing a few workers, opened for business in Phnom Penh and in other urban areas.

This inchoate private sector played such an important role in the national economic recovery that party leaders urged its official recognition, at the Fifth Congress in October 1985, as a means of mitigating the weaknesses of the state-run economy. Thus, the government added a fourth component—private economy—to the economic system and legitimized it with a constitutional amendment in February 1986.

=== First plan (1986–1990) ===
The First Five-Year Program of Socioeconomic Restoration and Development (1986–90), or First Plan, originated in February 1984, when the heads of the state planning commissions of Vietnam, Laos, and Cambodia met in Ho Chi Minh City (formerly Saigon) and agreed to coordinate their 1986 to 1990 economic plans. Heng Samrin formally announced Cambodia's plan in his political report to the congress.

The plan was intended to open a new phase of the Cambodian revolution; it gave highest priority to agricultural production, calling it "the first front line," and focused on the four sectors of food, rubber, fishing, and timber. It set production targets for each sector. During the plan period, food production was to increase 7 percent a year to keep up with a targeted 2.8 percent annual population growth rate, which did not seem to have been reached by 1987. The plan projected that by 1990, rubber farming would expand to 50,000 hectares in order to produce 50,000 tons of latex; timber production would reach 200,000 cubic meters; jute production would increase to 15,000 tons; and fish production would amount to 130,000 tons. As in the past, the plan labeled agriculture and forestry as the real force of the national economy.

The plan was less specific for the industrial sector. It did not set industrial production targets, except that for electrical output, which was projected to reach 300 million kilowatt hours per year in 1990. The plan called attention to the need for selective restoration of existing industrial production capabilities and for proposed progressive construction of a small to medium industrial base, which would be more appropriate to the country's situation.

The plan placed increased emphasis on the distribution of goods. Trade organizations were to be perfected at all levels, and socialist trading networks were to be expanded in all localities. In particular, the trade relationship between the state and the peasantry was to be improved and consolidated in accordance with the motto, "For the peasantry, selling rice and agricultural products to the state is patriotism; for the state, selling goods and delivering them directly to the people is being responsible to the people."

The plan also required that investment be directed toward the improvement of the infrastructure, particularly toward the reconstruction of communication lines and waterworks. Road, inland waterways, and railroad networks had to be restored to serve the national economy and defense.

Last but not least, the plan cited "export and thrift" (without elaboration), as the two primary policies to be followed in order to solve the national budget deficit. The plan implied that into the 1990s, exports would have to consist principally of agricultural and forestry products, to which some value might be added by low-technology processing. "Thrift," although undefined, could, in the future, include some kind of government savings plan, with incentives for small depositors, to absorb surplus riels generated by Cambodia's considerable free-market and black-market sectors.

Heng Samrin, like his predecessors, Sihanouk and Pol Pot, urged Cambodians to undertake the task of economic restoration "in the spirit of mainly relying on one's own forces." Unlike Sihanouk and Pol Pot, however, the KPRP leader stressed economic and technical cooperation with Vietnam. He believed such cooperation would be "an indispensable factor" in the development of agriculture and of forestry in Cambodia. Heng Samrin also advocated better economic cooperation with the Soviet Union and with other socialist countries.

== Recent economic history ==
Industry accounted for only 5 percent of Cambodia's GDP in 1985, down from 19 percent in 1969. Industrial activity continued to be concentrated in the processing of agricultural commodities, mostly rice, fish, wood, and rubber. Manufacturing plants were small, and they employed an average of fewer than 200 workers. These plants aimed to produce enough consumer goods (soft drinks, cigarettes, and food items) and household products (soap, paper, and utensils) to satisfy local demand.

The extent of Cambodia's industrial rehabilitation could be gauged by a comparison of enterprises in prewar and in postwar times. In 1969 the last year before the country was engulfed in the war sweeping Indochina, a census disclosed 18 large industries countrywide (13 public and 5 mixed public-private sector) and 33,000 small and medium privately owned enterprises. About half the factories operating in 1969 were rice mills, or were otherwise engaged in rice processing.

In 1985 the government news agency (Sarpodamean Kampuchea) announced that fifty-six factories had been renovated and had been put back into operation. In the capital itself, about half of Phnom Penh's prewar plants had reopened by 1985. Most industries were producing at far below capacity because of frequent power cuts, shortages of spare parts and of raw materials, and the lack of both skilled workers and experienced managers. Industrial revival continued to be difficult and extremely slow because it was based mainly on the use of limited local resources.

Tech startups began in the 2010s in Cambodia but face heavy challenges due to high turnover and a homogenous population.
