= Apsara field =

The Apsara field is a subsea oil field in Cambodian waters in the central Gulf of Thailand. Oil was discovered in the area in the early 2000s, but was produced only briefly in the early 2020s before the project collapsed after failing to meet production targets.

== History ==
In 2002, Chevron acquired development rights to the region, and discovered oil in 2004. Chevron was unable to negotiate financial terms with the Cambodian government to develop the field, and in 2014 sold its rights to a 1,190 square miles (3,100 km^{2}) region, including what would be developed as the Apsara field, to Singapore-based KrisEnergy for $65 million. In August 2017, KrisEnergy and Cambodia announced that wells would be drilled in the field in the following years, with Cambodia taking a 5% ownership stake in the field, which would be the first to produce oil within the country. Apsara was expected to yield about $500 million for the government from a production of about 30 million barrels of oil over nine years. At the time, KrisEnergy expected to ship the first oil within two years from a single platform, with as many as ten operating at full buildout.

Development of Apsara was delayed while KrisEnergy arranged financing for operations, ultimately securing an $87 million loan in April 2020 for construction of the first phase of the project, expected to produce 7,500 barrels of oil per day by the end of 2020. By October, construction of the offshore platform was underway, with both a production barge and a drilling jackship at the Apsara site. Production began on 28 December from a single well, with four more added in the early months of 2021. However, production did not come close to projections, with a peak production by April of about 3,500 barrels per day and an average of about 2,800 barrels per day. A subsequent analysis of the field by an outside consultant found that achievable extraction from the field would be far short of original estimates, and as a result KrisEnergy, which carried heavy debt that it had planned to service with revenue from the Apsara field, filed for liquidation in June; an announcement that was nevertheless followed days later by a ceremony in Cambodia to celebrate the country's oil production.

In total, about 300,000 barrels of oil were produced at Apsara and loaded onto the tanker Strovolos, which had been chartered by KrisEnergy. In June, with fuel oil on the ship running short, the captain of Strovolos sailed south towards Indonesia to resupply and change crews after KrisEnergy was unable to pay for additional fuel. The following month, Cambodia alleged that its oil had been stolen and requested that Strovolos be seized; an Indonesian Navy vessel subsequently intercepted the tanker and impounded her near Batam. As a result of KrisEnergy's bankruptcy, the legal owner of the cargo of oil, with an estimated value of $20 million, was unclear, and World Tankers, the owner of Strovolos, refused to release the oil through late September, when Indonesian authorities arrested the ship's crew.
