= Wing Bank =

Cambodian commercial bank

- Type: Public limited company
- Industry: Banking, financial services
- Founded: 2008
- Headquarters: Phnom Penh, Cambodia
- Area served: Cambodia
- Website: www.wingbank.com.kh

Wing Bank is a Cambodian commercial bank headquartered in Phnom Penh. It was established in 2008 as a subsidiary of Australia and New Zealand Banking Group (ANZ), and began offering mobile payment services in 2009. It later received a commercial banking licence from the National Bank of Cambodia.

== History ==
Wing Cambodia Limited was established in 2008 as a subsidiary of Australia and New Zealand Banking Group (ANZ). It was established to provide mobile payment services in Cambodia through mobile accounts and a network of agents.

Wing launched its mobile payment service in early 2009. During its development, the International Finance Corporation (IFC) worked with ANZ on market research and financial modelling and held discussions with the National Bank of Cambodia on regulatory matters. The service allowed customers to make payments, deposits and withdrawals through Wing agents, regardless of their mobile network.

In 2010, Wing began a pilot programme with microfinance institution AMK, allowing selected AMK branches to operate as Wing outlets. ANZ later sold Wing to Interlogistics Ltd, which also owned Refresh Mobile (Cambodia). The two businesses were then combined under the Wing name.

In 2013, Wing was one of three financial institutions selected for a Cambodian government programme to pay public employees through bank accounts. The other two were ACLEDA Bank and Canadia Bank.

In 2014, Wing partnered with the Foreign Trade Bank of Cambodia to distribute prepaid Visa cards and provide top-up services through its outlets.

Wing later operated as Wing (Cambodia) Limited Specialised Bank. In 2016, the Ministry of Commerce authorised the company to process payments for businesses using Cambodia's online business registration system.

Wing later received a commercial banking licence from the National Bank of Cambodia and became Wing Bank (Cambodia) Plc. The licence allowed it to accept deposits and provide loans alongside its existing services. In 2025, the GSMA described Wing's development from a mobile money service into a provider of broader banking services.

== Operations ==
Wing initially relied on a network of agents through which customers could deposit and withdraw cash, transfer money and make payments. A World Bank study reported that Wing had subscribers and cash-in and cash-out outlets across Cambodia.

In 2015, the Phnom Penh Post described Wing as Cambodia's first domestic mobile payment provider and reported on its agent network. A 2025 report by the GSMA also discussed Wing's nationwide agent network and registered customers.

Wing provides services to businesses and other financial institutions. In 2023, The Banker reported that its customers and partners included financial institutions, insurers, companies and merchants.

== Technology ==
Wing's original mobile payment system worked across different mobile networks. Customers could make transactions through mobile phones and Wing's agent network, while those without their own phones could access their accounts using shared devices.

By 2025, Wing was using data analytics and machine learning to assess loan applications. According to a GSMA case study, the bank used customer data, predictive analysis and underwriting scorecards, drawing on information from Credit Bureau Cambodia and its internal databases.

The same report described Wing's use of artificial intelligence for transaction monitoring, cybersecurity and customer profiling. It also noted that the bank was developing a Khmer-language chatbot designed to handle voice and text interactions in both Khmer and English.

== See also ==
- List of banks in Cambodia
- National Bank of Cambodia
- ACLEDA Bank
- Canadia Bank
