= Cambodia Commercial Bank =

Cambodian Commercial Bank (CCB) is a commercial bank in Cambodia. Established in 1991, it was the country's first commercial bank and is now a wholly owned subsidiary of Thailand's Siam Commercial Bank.

== History ==
Cambodian Commercial Bank was established on 1 July 1991 as a joint venture between Siam Commercial Bank and the National Bank of Cambodia. The bank was established during Cambodia's transition toward a market economy and handled banking operations associated with the United Nations Transitional Authority in Cambodia (UNTAC).

The bank is a wholly owned subsidiary of Siam Commercial Bank of Thailand. It operates four locations in Cambodia: its head office in Phnom Penh and branches in Siem Reap, Battambang and Sihanoukville. Its commercial banking licence was renewed for an indefinite period on 28 November 2006.

== See also ==
- List of banks in Cambodia
- National Bank of Cambodia
- Economy of Cambodia
