= List of banks in Cambodia =

This is a list of banks in Cambodia.

As of July 31, 2020, there were 51 commercial banks, 14 specialized banks, 75 microfinance institutions, 7 microfinance deposit-taking institutions, 6 representative offices, and 15 leasing companies in Cambodia.

As of September 30, 2021, there were 54 commercial banks, 10 specialized banks, 79 microfinance institutions, 6 microfinance deposit-taking institutions, 6 representative offices, and 17 financial leasing companies in Cambodia.

As of June 20, 2022, according to the National Bank of Cambodia there are 58 commercial banks in Cambodia.

== Central bank ==
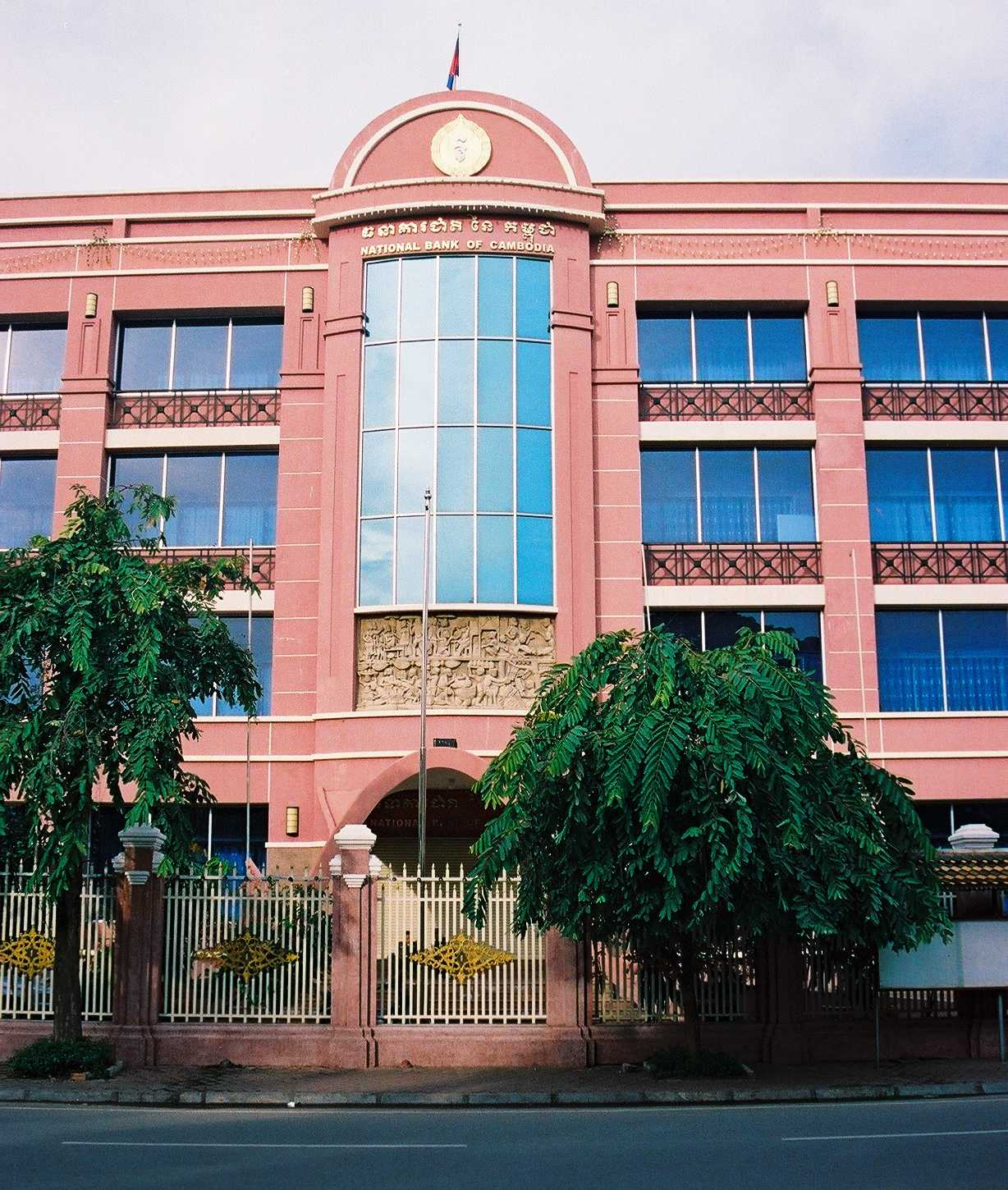
National Bank of Cambodia

=== National Bank of Cambodia ===
Canadia Bank's headquarter, Canadia Tower

== Locally-owned banks ==
Bank name in English	Bank name in Khmer	Bank website	Head office
SBI LY HOUR Bank Plc	ធនាគារ អេស ប៊ី អាយ លី ហួរ ម.ក	https://www.sbilhbank.com.kh	Building 219, Street128&169, Sangkat Mittapheap, Khan 7 Makara, Phnom Penh
ACLEDA Bank	ធនាគារ អេស៊ីលីដា	https://www.acledabank.com.kh/kh/eng/	#61, Preah Monivong Blvd., Sangkat Srah Chork, Khan Daun Penh, Phnom Penh
Agricultural and Rural Development Bank (ARDB)	ធនាគារ អភិវឌ្ឍន៍ជនបទ	https://www.ardb.com.kh/	#9-13, St 7, Sangkat Chaktomuk, Phnom Penh
Asia-Pacific Development Bank	ធនាគារ អេស៊ា-ប៉ាស៊ីហ្វិក ឌីវេឡុបមេន	https://apdbank.com.kh/en	#132, (Corner) Norodom Blvd and Street 294 Sangkat Tonle Bassac, Khan Chamkarmon Phnom Penh
BRIDGE Bank PLC	ធនាគារ ប្រ៊ីដ ម.ក	https://www.bridgebank.com.kh/	#46E0, No.92 Norodom Blvd., Sangkat Chakto Mukh, Khan Doun Penh, Phnom Penh, Cambodia
Cambodia Asia Bank	ធនាគារ កម្ពុជា អាស៊ី	https://www.cab.com.kh/	#333 Preah Sihanouk Blvd (274), Phnom Penh
Cambodia Post Bank (CPB)	ធនាគារ ប្រៃសណីយ៍កម្ពុជា	https://www.cambodiapostbank.com/	#265-269, St.Ang Duong, Sangkat Wat Phnom, Khan Doun Penh, Phnom Penh
Canadia Bank	ធនាគារ កាណាឌីយ៉ា	https://www.canadiabank.com.kh/	#315, Ang Doung St. Corner Monivong Blvd, Phnom Penh
Chip Mong Commercial Bank	ធនាគារ ជីប ម៉ុង	https://www.chipmongbank.com/en	#137B, Mao Tse Tung Blvd., Sangkat Boeung Keng Kang 3, Khan Chamkarmon, Phnom Penh
Foreign Trade Bank of Cambodia (FTB)	ធនាគារ ពាណិជ្ជកម្មក្រៅប្រទេស នៃកម្ពុជា	https://ftbbank.com/en/	Czech Republic Blvd (169), Khan 7 Makara, Phnom Penh
Oriental Bank PLC	ធនាគារ អូរៀនថល	https://www.orientalbank.com.kh/	#101, Corner of Norodom Blvd(41) & Samdach Pan Avenue (214), Sangkat Boeng Riang, Khan Doun Penh, Phnom Penh, 12211
Union Commercial Bank (UCB)	ធនាគារ សហពាណិជ្ជកម្ម	https://www.ucb.com.kh/	ESUN Tower, Preah Monivong Blvd, Sangkat Boeng Proluet, Khan 7 Makara, Phnom Penh
Vattanac Bank	ធនាគារ វឌ្ឍនៈ	https://www.vattanacbank.com/	Level 2, Vattanac Capital, No. 66, Preah Monivong Blvd, Phnom Penh
Wing Bank	ធនាគារ វីង	https://www.wingmoney.com/en/	#721, Preah Monivong Blvd (93), Phnom Penh
LOLC Cambodia	អិលអូអិលស៊ី (ខេមបូឌា) ភីអិលស៊ី	https://www.lolc.com.kh/	#666B, Street 271, Kbal Tumnub Muoy Village, Sangkat Boeng Tumpun 2, Khan Mean Chey, Phnom Penh, Cambodia.

== Foreign-owned, joint venture, or subsidiary banks ==
English Name	Khmer Name	Website	Foreign affiliation	Head office	Status
Advanced Bank of Asia (ABA)	ធនាគារ វឌ្ឍនៈ អាស៊ី ចំកាត់	https://www.ababank.com/en/	National Bank of Canada	#148, Preah Sihanouk Blvd, Sangkat Boeung Keng Kang I, Khan Boeung Keng Kang, Phnom Penh	
AEON Specialized Bank	ធនាគារ ឯកទេស អ៊ីអន	https://aeon.com.kh/	ÆON Co., Ltd.	6th floor (S603) of Diamond Twin Tower, Koh Pich, Sangkat Tonle Basak, Khan Chamkar Mon, Phnom Penh	
Agribank Cambodia Branch	ធនាគារ អាហ្រ្គីប៊ែង សាខាកម្ពុជា	http://agribank.com.kh/index.html	Agribank Vietnam	#364, Preah Monivong, Street 93, Phnom Penh 12302, Cambodia	
Bank of China (Cambodia)	ធនាគារ ចិន (កម្ពុជា)	https://www.bankofchina.com.kh/en-kh/home.html	Bank of China (Hong Kong)	Canadia Tower, 1st & 2nd Floor, St. 315 Ang Duong, Phnom Penh	
Bank for Investment and Development of Cambodia (BIDC)	ធនាគារ ប៊ីអាយឌីស៊ី	https://www.bidc.com.kh/en/individual	Bank for Investment and Development of Vietnam	#235, Preah Norodom Blvd, Sangkat Tonle Bassac, Khan Chamkamorn, Phnom Penh	
Bangkok Bank (Cambodia)	ធនាគារ បាងកក	https://www.bangkokbank.com/en/International-Banking/Asean/Cambodia-Business-Banking	Bangkok Bank	#344, Mao Tse Toung Blvd (245), Phnom Penh	
B.I.C (Cambodia) Bank	ធនាគារ ប៊ីធនាគារ ប្រេដ ប៊ែង ខេមបូឌាអាយស៊ី	https://www.bicbank.com.kh/	Joint Venture (Cambodia, Laos, and Thailand Investment Groups)	#462, Monivong Blvd (93), Sangkat Tonle Bassac, Khan Chamkar Morn, Phnom Penh	
Bred Bank (Cambodia)	ធនាគារ ប្រេដ ប៊ែង ខេមបូឌា	https://www.bredcambodia.com/	BRED Banque populaire	#30, Preah Norodom Boulevard, Sangkat Phsar Thmey 3, Khan Daun Penh, Phnom Penh	
Cambodian Commercial Bank	ធនាគារ កម្ពុជា ពាណិជ្ជកម្ម	https://www.scb.co.th/ccb/corporate-banking.html	Siam Commercial Bank	#26, Preah Monivong Blvd (93), Phnom Penh	
Cambodian Public Bank	ធនាគារ កម្ពុជា សាធារណៈ	https://www.cpbebank.com/Home	Public Bank Berhad	#23 Kramuon Sar St. (114), Sangkat Phsar Thmey 2, Khan Daun Penh, Phnom Penh	
CIMB Bank	ធនាគារ ស៊ីអាយអេមប៊ី ភីអិលស៊ី	https://www.cimbbank.com.kh/en/p	CIMB	#187 E0E1, Mao Tse Toung Boulevard, Sangkat Toul Svay Prey Ti 1, Khan Chamkarmon, PhnomPenh	
Cathay United Bank (Cambodia)	ធនាគារ កាថេ យូណាយធីត	https://www.cathaybk.com.kh/#&panel1-1	Cathay United Bank	#5-6B/294, Mao Tse Toung Blvd (245), Phnom Penh	
CHIEF (Cambodia) Commercial Bank	ធនាគារ ឈិហ្វ (ខេមបូឌា)	https://www.chiefbank.com.kh/	Chief Group	C-01, St.R11, Corner St. 70, Phnom Penh City Center, Phum 1 Sangkat Sras Chork, Phnom Penh	Under provisional administration (3 months since September 21st, 2026)
DGB Bank	ធនាគារ ឌីជីប៊ី	https://www.dgbcambodia.com/	DGB Financial Group	#689B, Kampucheakrom Blvd, Sangkat Teuk Laak1, Khan Toul Kork, Phnom Penh	
Hattha Bank	ធនាគារ ហត្ថា	https://www.hatthabank.com/	Bank of Ayudhya (Krungsri Bank)	#606, St.271, Sansam Kosal 3 village/Boeng Tumpun 1, Sangkat Mean Chey, KhanPhnom Penh	
Hong Leong Bank (Cambodia)	ធនាគារ ហុង លីអុង	https://www.hlb.com.kh/en/personal-banking/home.html	Hong Leong Bank	#28, Samdech Pan Avenue (St.214), Sangkat Boeung Raing, Khan Daun Penh, Phnom Penh	
J Trust Royal Bank	ធនាគារ ជេ ត្រាស់ រ៉ូយ៉ាល់	https://jtrustroyal.com/en/personal/	Joint Venture (J Trust Group & Royal Group of Companies)	#20 Kramoun Sar & Corner of Street 67, Sangkat Phsar Thmey I, Khan Daun Penh, Phnom Penh	
Kookmin Bank Cambodia	ធនាគារ គូកមីន កម្ពុជា	https://online-kbcambodia.com/	Kookmin Bank	#55, St. 214, Sangkat Boeung Raing, Khan Daun Penh, Phnom Penh	
Kasikorn Bank (Cambodia)	ធនាគារ កសិកន	https://www.kasikornbank.com.kh/KH/Pages/Landing.aspx	Kasikorn Bank	#274, Preah Sihanouk Blvd (274), Phnom Penh	
Krung Thai Bank Public	ធនាគារ ក្រុងថៃ ចំកាត់ (មហាជន)	https://krungthai.com/en/contact-us/foreign-branch	Krung Thai Bank	#149, Road 215, Sangkat Deiao, 1 Market, Tuankok District Phnom Penh	
Maybank (Cambodia)	ធនាគារ មេឃប៊ែង (ខេមបូឌា)	https://www.maybank2u.com.kh/en/personal/index.page	Maybank	#43, Maybank Tower, Preah Norodom Blvd (41), Phnom Penh	
Phnom Penh Commercial Bank	ធនាគារ ភ្នំពេញ ពាណិជ្ជ	https://www.ppcbank.com.kh/	JEONBUK BANK	#217, Norodom Blvd, Sangkat Tonle Bassac, Khan Chamkamorn, Phnom Penh	
Phillip Bank	ធនាគារ ហ្វីលីព	https://www.phillipbank.com.kh/en	Phillip Capital	#27DEFG, Preah Monivong Blvd, Sangkat Srah Chak, Khan Doun Penh, Phnom Penh,	
RHB BANK (Cambodia)	ធនាគារ អ អេច ប៊ី ប៊ែង(ខេមបូឌា)	https://www.rhbgroup.com.kh/	RHB Bank	Street 108 Corner Street 110, Phnom Penh	
Sathapana Bank	ធនាគារ ស្ថាបនា	https://www.sathapana.com.kh/	MARUHAN Corporation	#63, Sathapana Tower, Preah Norodom Blvd (41), Penh 12210	
SBI Ly Hour Bank	ធនាគារ អេស ប៊ី អាយ លី ហ៊ួរ	https://sbilhbank.com.kh/en/	SBI Holdings, Inc	#219, Street128&169, Sangkat Mittapheap, Khan Prampir Makara, Phnom Penh	
Standard Chartered Bank	ធនាគារ ស្តាន់ដារឆាទើរែត	https://www.sc.com/kh/	Standard Chartered	Unit G-02, Himawari Hotel No. 313, Preah Sisowath Quay, 12210	
Sacombank Cambodia	ធនាគារ សាខមប៊ែង ខេមបូឌា	https://www.sacombank.com.kh/	Saigon Thuong Tin Commercial Joint Stock Bank	#60, Preah Norodom Blvd (41), Phnom Penh	
Shinhan Cambodia Bank	ធនាគារ ស៊ិនហាន ខ្មែរ	https://www.shinhan.com.kh/en	Shinhan Bank	#79, Street Kampuchea Krom Blvd (128), Phnom Penh 12251	
Woori Bank (Cambodia)	ធនាគារ អ៊ូរី	https://www.wooribank.com.kh/	Woori Bank	#398, Preah Monivong Blvd., Sangkat Boeng Keng Kang 1, Khan Boeng Keng Kang, Phnom Penh.	

== See also ==
- Cambodia and the World Bank
- Cambodia and the International Monetary Fund
- Economy of Cambodia
