= Economy of Cambodia =

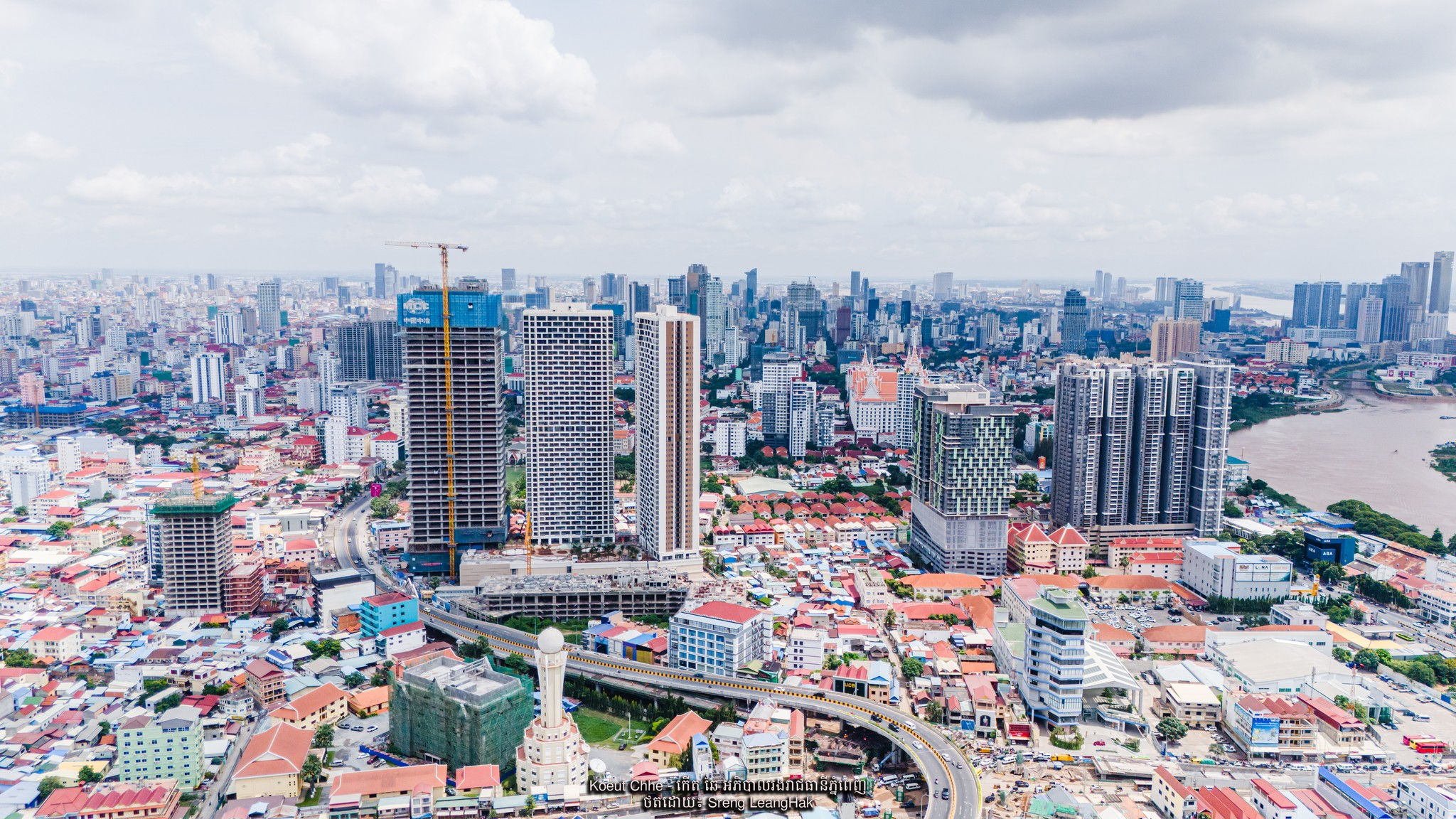
- Phnom Penh, the capital and largest city of Cambodia
- Currency: Riel (KHR, ៛)
- Fiscal year: Calendar year
- Trade organisations: WTO, ASEAN, AFTA, RCEP, SCO, G77
- Country group: Least developed; Lower-middle income economy

Statistics
- Population: ▲17,181,065 (2024)
- GDP: ▲$52.379 Billion (nominal;(2026); ▲$160.111 Billion (PPP;(2026)
- GDP rank: 96th (nominal; 2026); 90th (PPP; 2026)
- GDP growth: ▲5.3% (2025); ▲3.0% (2026); ▲4.0% (2027f)
- GDP per capita: ▲$3,001 (nominal;(2026); ▲$8,870 (PPP;(2026)
- GDP per capita rank: 146th (nominal, 2026); 138th (PPP, 2026)
- GDP by sector: agriculture: 25.3%; industry: 32.8%; services: 41.9%; (2023 est.)
- Inflation (CPI): ▼2% (2023 est.)
- Population below national poverty line: ▼14.2% (2022, World Bank); N/A on less than $3.20/day
- Gini coefficient: 23.6 low (2024)
- Human Development Index: ▲0.600 medium (2023) (146th); ▲0.593 medium IHDI (2022)
- Labour force: ▲9,230,114 (2019); ▲81.1% employment rate (2016)
- Labour force by occupation: agriculture: 21.87%; industry: 37.67%; services: 33.74%; (2023 est.)
- Unemployment: ▲0.3% (2017 est.); high underemployment, according to official statistics
- Main industries: tourism, garments, construction, rice milling, fishing, wood and wood products, rubber, cement, gem mining, textiles

External
- Exports: ▲$26.16 billion (2024 est.)
- Export goods: clothing, precious metal scraps, trunks/cases, gold, leather footwear
- Main export partners: United States 35.7%; Germany 6.12% (2023)
- Imports: ▲$28.5 billion (2024 est.)
- Import goods: refined petroleum, clothing, gold, cars, flavored water
- Main import partners: China 39.4%; Thailand 20.2%; Vietnam 11.8%; Singapore 6.23% (2023)
- FDI stock: $55.3 billion (2024 est.); Abroad: N/A
- Current account: ▼ −$1.563 billion (2024 est.)
- Gross external debt: ▲$11.92 billion (11 Dec 2024 est.)

Public finance
- Government debt: ▲19.3% of GDP (2024 est.)
- Foreign reserves: ▲$21.285 billion (25 April 2024 est.)
- Budget balance: −3.5% (of GDP) (2024 est.)
- Revenue: $7.99 billion (2024 est.)
- Spending: $9.13 billion (2024 est.)
- Economic aid: $934 million pledged in grants and concessional loans for 2011 by international donors
- Credit rating: Standard & Poor's: B+ (domestic); B+ (foreign); BB- (T&C assessment)
- All values, unless otherwise stated, are in US dollars.

Cambodia's economy currently follows an open market system (market economy) and has seen rapid economic progress in the last decade. Cambodia's two largest industries are textiles and tourism, while agricultural activities remain the main source of income for many Cambodians living in rural areas. The service sector is heavily concentrated on trading activities and catering-related services. Recently, Cambodia has reported that oil and natural gas reserves have been found offshore. In recent years, illicit economic activities like cyber scam center operations have become an increasingly prominent of Cambodia's economy, representing as much as 40% of Cambodia's official GDP in 2024.

In 1995, with a GDP of $2.92 billion the Cambodian government transformed the country's economic system from a planned economy to its present market-driven system. Following those changes, growth was estimated at a value of 7% while inflation dropped from 26% in 1994 to only 6% in 1995. Imports increased due to the influx of foreign aid, and exports, particularly from the country's garment industry, also increased. Cambodia's economic growth translated to about 0.71% for the ASEAN economy in 2016.

After four years of improving economic performance, Cambodia's economy slowed in 1997–1998 due to the 1997 Asian financial crisis, civil unrest, and political infighting. Foreign investments declined during this period. Also, in 1998 the main harvest was hit by drought. But in 1999, the first full year of relative peace in 30 years, progress was made on economic reforms and growth resumed at 4%.

Currently, Cambodia's foreign policy focuses on establishing friendly borders with its neighbors (such as Thailand and Vietnam), as well as integrating itself into regional (ASEAN) and global (WTO) trading systems. Some of the obstacles faced by this emerging economy are the need for a better education system and the lack of a skilled workforce; particularly in the poverty-ridden countryside, which struggles with inadequate basic infrastructure. Nonetheless, Cambodia continues to attract investors because of its low wages, plentiful labor, proximity to Asian raw materials, and favorable tax treatment.

== Recent economic history ==
Following its independence from France in 1953, the Cambodian state has undergone five periods of political, social, and economic transformation:

1. First Kingdom of Cambodia (1953–1970)
2. Khmer Republic (1970–1975)
3. Democratic Kampuchea (1975–1982, ousted in 1979); became Coalition Government of Democratic Kampuchea in exile (1982–1993)
4. People's Republic of Kampuchea (1979–1989), later renamed "State of Cambodia" (1989–1993)
5. Second Kingdom of Cambodia (1993–present)

In 1989, the State of Cambodia implemented reform policies that transformed the Cambodian economic system from a command economy to an open market one. In line with the economic reformation, private property rights were introduced and state-owned enterprises were privatized. Cambodia also focused on integrating itself into regional and international economic blocs, such as the Association of South East Asian Nations and the World Trade Organization respectively. These policies triggered a growth in the economy, with its national GDP growing at an average of 6.1% before a period of domestic unrest and regional economic instability in 1997 (1997 Asian financial crisis). However, conditions improved and since 1999, the Cambodian economy has continued to grow at an average pace of approximately 6–8% per annum.

In 2007, Cambodia's gross domestic product grew by an estimated 18.6%. Garment exports rose by almost 8%, while tourist arrivals increased by nearly 35%. With exports decreasing, the 2007 GDP growth was driven largely by consumption and investment. Foreign direct investment (FDI) inflows reached US$600 million (7 percent of GDP), slightly more than what the country received in official aid. Domestic investment, driven largely by the private sector, accounted for 23.4 percent of GDP. Export growth, especially to the US, began to slow in late 2007 accompanied by stiffer competition from Vietnam and emerging risks (a slowdown in the US economy and lifting of safeguards on China's exports). US companies were the fifth largest investors in Cambodia, with more than $1.2 billion in investments over the period 1997–2007.

Cambodia was severely damaged economically by the 2008 financial crisis, and its main economic sector, the garment industry, suffered a 23% drop in exports to the United States and Europe. As a result, 60,000 workers were laid off. However, in the last quarter of 2009 and early 2010, conditions were beginning to improve and the Cambodian economy began to recover. Cambodian exports to the US for the first 11 months of 2012 reached $2.49 billion, a 1 per cent increase year-on-year. Its imports of US goods grew 26 per cent for that period, reaching $213 million. Another factor underscoring the potential of the Cambodian economy is the recent halving of its poverty rate. The poverty rate is 20.5 per cent, meaning that approximately 2.8 million people live below the poverty line.

== Data ==
The following table shows the main economic indicators in 1986–2020 (with IMF staff estimates in 2021–2026). Inflation below 5% is in green. The annual unemployment rate is extracted from the World Bank, although the International Monetary Fund find them unreliable.

Year	GDP (in bn. US$PPP)	GDP per capita (in US$ PPP)	GDP (in bn. US$nominal)	GDP per capita (in US$ nominal)	GDP growth (real)	Inflation rate (in Percent)	Unemployment (in Percent)	Government debt (in % of GDP)
1986	n/a	n/a	0.2	25.71	n/a	n/a	n/a	n/a
1987	4.3	516.02	▼0.1	▼17.1	n/a	▲-31.2%	n/a	n/a
1988	▲4.8	▲569.1	▲0.3	▲32.6	▲9.6%	▲23.0%	n/a	n/a
1989	▲5.2	▲593.1	0.3	▲39.7	▲3.3%	▲63.8%	n/a	n/a
1990	▲5.4	▲602.5	▲0.9	▲99.8	▲1.1%	▲141.8%	n/a	n/a
1991	▲6.0	▲647.5	▲2.0	▲215.7	▲7.6%	▲191.0%	0.7%	n/a
1992	▲6.6	▲684.4	▲2.4	▲252.5	▲7.1%	▲75.0%	▲0.8%	n/a
1993	▲7.0	▲703.6	2.4	▼242.5	▲4.0%	▲114.3%	0.8%	n/a
1994	▲7.8	▲745.9	▲2.8	▲265.1	▲8.2%	▲10.4%	▲1.3%	n/a
1995	▲8.4	▲781.7	▲3.4	▲319.5	▲6.0%	▲10.1%	▼0.8%	n/a
1996	▲9.1	▲818.5	▲3.5	▼316.2	▲5.9%	▲7.1%	0.8%	30.2%
1997	▲9.6	▲842.8	▼3.4	▼302.2	▲4.0%	▲10.5%	▲0.9%	▲31.6%
1998	▲10.2	▲870.1	▼3.1	▼267.9	▲4.7%	▲12.9%	0.9%	▲37.2%
1999	▲11.6	▲971.9	▲3.5	▲293.7	▲12.7%	▲2.0%	0.9%	▼34.7%
2000	▲13.0	▲1,065.4	▲3.7	▲300.0	▲9.6%	▲-0.8%	▲1.0%	▲35.2%
2001	▲14.4	▲1,158.3	▲4.0	▲320.0	▲8.6%	▲-0.1%	1.0%	▼34.9%
2002	▲15.6	▲1,230.7	▲4.3	▲337.5	▲6.6%	▲0.0%	▲1.1%	▲39.7%
2003	▲17.3	▲1,336.5	▲4.7	▲360.7	▲8.5%	▲1.0%	1.1%	▲43.1%
2004	▲19.6	▲1,489.6	▲5.3	▲405.6	▲10.3%	▲3.9%	1.1%	▼42.7%
2005	▲22.9	▲1,712.6	▲6.3	▲470.7	▲13.3%	▲6.3%	1.1%	▼35.6%
2006	▲26.1	▲1,925.8	▲7.3	▲536.2	▲10.8%	▲6.1%	▲1.2%	▼30.7%
2007	▲29.5	▲2,149.0	▲8.6	▲627.8	▲10.2%	▲7.7%	▲1.3%	▼29.4%
2008	▲32.1	▲2,305.0	▲10.3	▲741.9	▲6.7%	▲25.0%	▼0.8%	▼27.0%
2009	▲32.4	▼2,299.1	▲10.4	▼737.2	▲0.1%	▲-0.7%	▼0.6%	▲28.5%
2010	▲34.7	▲2,437.8	▲11.2	▲788.2	▲6.0%	▲4.0%	▲0.8%	▲28.7%
2011	▲38.0	▲2,635.9	▲12.8	▲889.8	▲7.1%	▲5.5%	▼0.6%	▲29.7%
2012	▲42.4	▲2,912.1	▲14.1	▲965.4	▲7.3%	▲2.9%	▼0.5%	▲31.5%
2013	▲45.8	▲3,109.9	▲15.2	▲1,034.8	▲7.4%	▲3.0%	▼0.4%	▲31.7%
2014	▲48.7	▲3,271.9	▲16.7	▲1,123.2	▲7.1%	▲3.9%	▲0.7%	▲31.9%
2015	▲52.6	▲3,500.6	▲18.1	▲1,203.5	▲7.0%	▲1.2%	▼0.4%	▼31.2%
2016	▲57.9	▲3,816.8	▲20.0	▲1,320.3	▲6.9%	▲3.0%	▲0.7%	▼29.1%
2017	▲62.8	▲4,097.5	▲22.2	▲1,446.9	▲7.0%	▲2.9%	▼0.1%	▲30.0%
2018	▲69.2	▲4,466.8	▲24.4	▲1,578.0	▲7.5%	▲2.4%	0.1%	▼28.6%
2019	▲75.4	▲4,832.7	▲26.7	▲1,713.3	▲7.0%	▲2.0%	0.1%	▲29.0%
2020	▼73.6	▼4,695.1	▼26.0	▼1,655.4	▼-3.5%	▲2.9%	▲0.3%	▲31.6%
2021	▲78.1	▲4,930.0	▲27.2	▲1,720.2	▲4.2%	▲3.1%	n/a	▲33.4%
2022	▲84.6	▲5,289.9	▲29.1	▲1,820.9	▲6.0%	▲2.8%	n/a	▲35.4%
2023	▲92.0	▲5,693.4	▲31.3	▲1,938.2	▲6.3%	▲3.0%	n/a	▲38.0%
2024	▲100.1	▲6,136.5	▲33.8	▲2,072.1	▲6.6%	▲3.0%	n/a	▲41.0%
2025	▲108.9	▲6,610.2	▲36.5	▲2,217.5	▲6.7%	▲3.0%	n/a	▲43.9%
2026	▲118.5	▲7,119.0	▲39.5	▲2,375.3	▲6.8%	▲3.0%	n/a	▲46.7%

== Economic sectors ==
=== Garment industry ===
The garment industry represents the largest portion of Cambodia's manufacturing sector, accounting for 80% of the country's exports. In 2012, the exports grew to $4.61 billion up 8% over 2011. In the first half of 2013, the garment industry reported exports worth $1.56 billion. The sector employs 335,400 workers, of which 91% are female.

The sector operates largely on the final phase of garment production, that is turning yarns and fabrics into garments, as the country lacks a strong textile manufacturing base. In 2005, there were fears that the end of the Multi Fibre Arrangement would threaten Cambodia's garment industry; exposing it to stiff competition with China's strong manufacturing capabilities. On the contrary, Cambodia's garment industry at present continues to grow rapidly. This is can be attributed to the country's open economic policy which has drawn in large amounts of foreign investment into this sector of the economy.

Garment Factories by Ownership Nationality in 2010:

Nationality of Ownership	Ownership by percentage	Number of factories owned
Taiwan	28%	66
China	19%	44
Hong Kong	17%	39
South Korea	13%	31
Malaysia	6%	14
Cambodia	5%	13
Singapore	4%	10
USA	4%	9
Others	4%	10

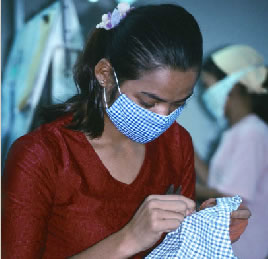
A garment factory worker in Cambodia undertaking health precautions

In 2010, 236 garment export-oriented factories were operating and registered with GMAC, the Garment Manufacturers Association in Cambodia, with 93% being foreign direct investment (FDI).

As seen in the table above, Cambodia's garment industry is characterized by a small percentage of local ownership. This is a reflection of the deficiency of skilled workers in the country as well as the limited leverage and autonomy Cambodian factories have in strategic decisions. Another characteristic of the industry is the country's competitive advantage as the only country where garment factories are monitored and reported according to national and international standards.

This has allowed Cambodia to secure its share of quotas for exports to the US through the US-Cambodia Trade Agreement on Textiles and Apparel (1999–2004), which linked market access to labor standards. However, the Cambodian garment industry remains vulnerable to global competition due to a lack of adequate infrastructure, labor unrest, the absence of a domestic textile industry, and almost complete dependence on imported textile material.

GMAC is establishing a specialized training institute to train garment workers. The institute is in Phnom Penh Special Economic Zone and will be completed by late 2016. It aims to train 1,600 garment workers in the first three years and 240 university students each year as part of a separate program.

=== Agriculture ===
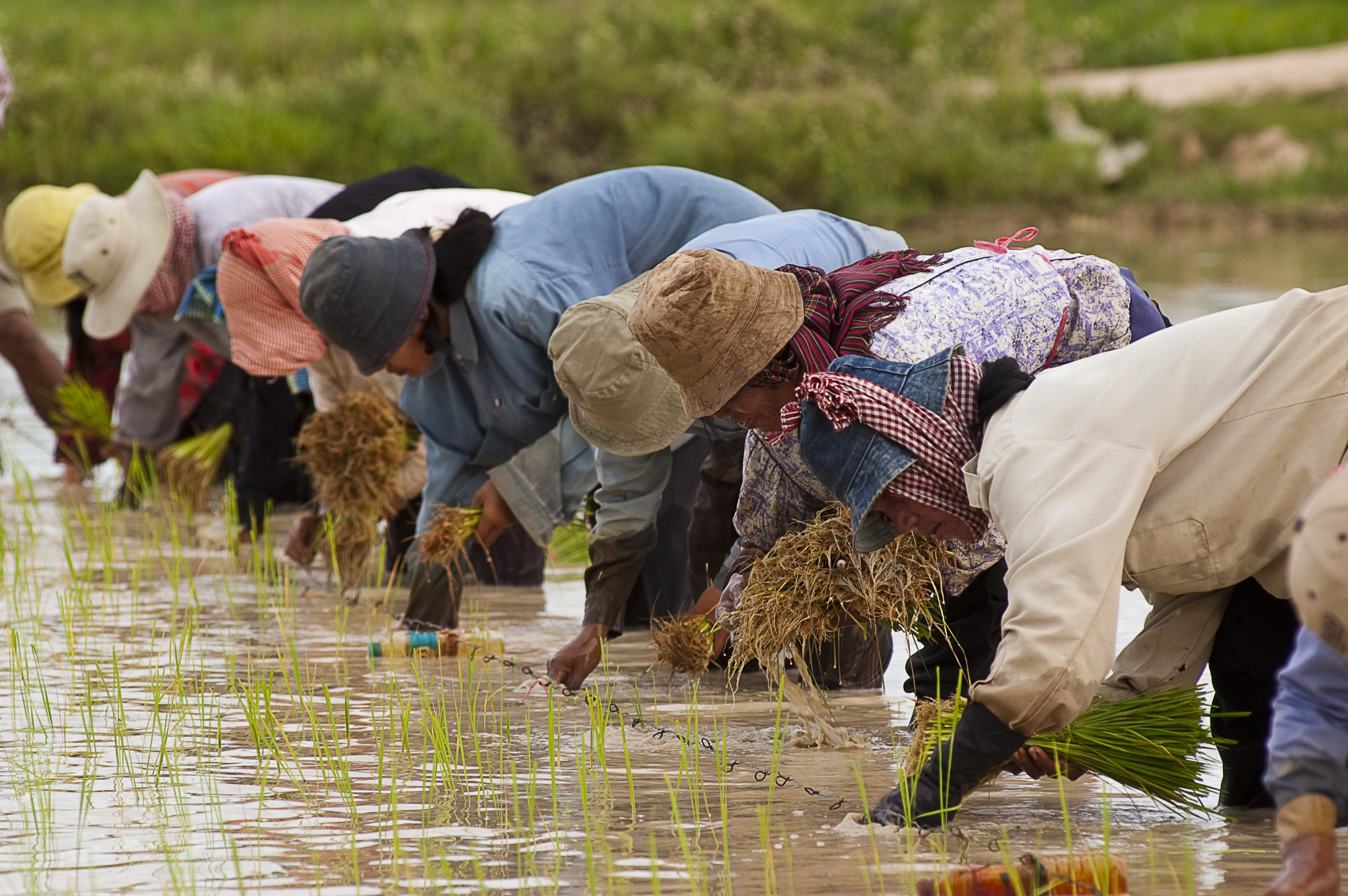
Cambodians planting rice, 2004.

Agriculture is the traditional mainstay of the Cambodian economy. Agriculture accounted for 90 percent of GDP in 1985 and employed approximately 80 percent of the work force. Rice is the principal commodity. The Ministry of Agriculture, Forestry and Fisheries is the government ministry of Cambodia that is responsible for governing activities of agriculture, forestry and the fishery industry in Cambodia.

Major secondary crops include maize, cassava, sweet potatoes, groundnuts, soybeans, sesame seeds, dry beans, and rubber. The principal commercial crop is rubber. In the 1980s it was an important primary commodity, second only to rice, and one of the country's few sources of foreign exchange.

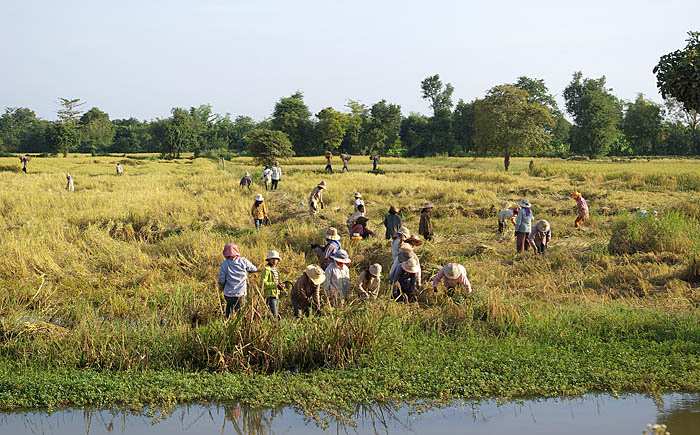
Rice milling is very important to the Cambodian economy.

=== Tourism ===
In the 1960s, Cambodia was a prominent tourist destination in the Southeast Asian region. Due to protracted periods of civil war, insurgencies, and especially the genocidal regime of the Khmer Rouge (see Khmer Rouge Genocide), Cambodia's tourism industry was reduced to being virtually non-existent. Since the late 1990s, tourism is fast becoming Cambodia's second largest industry, just behind the garment manufacturing. In 2006, Cambodia's tourism sector generated a revenue of US$1.594 billion, which made up approximately 16% of the country's GDP.

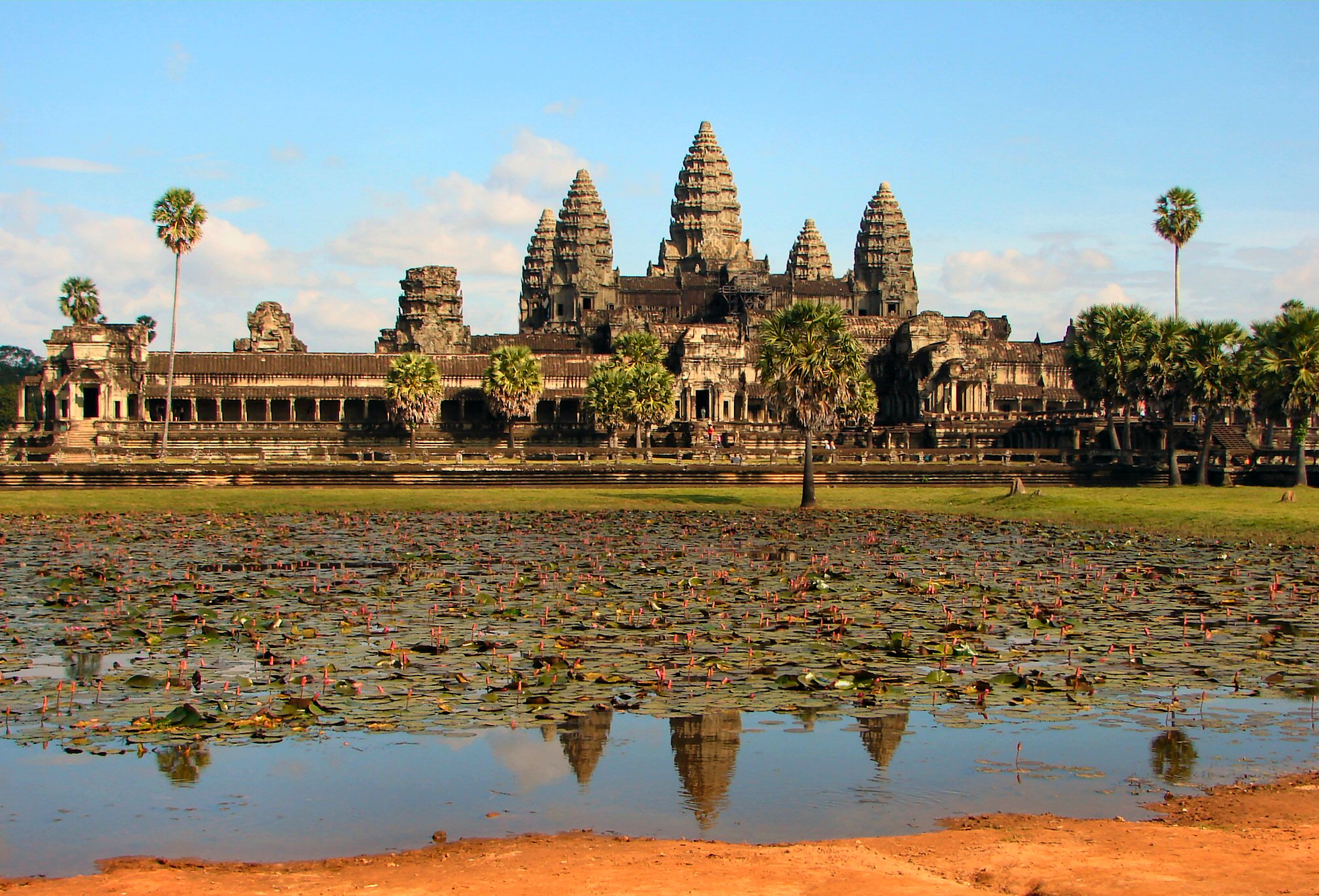
Angkor Wat in Siem Reap, Cambodia.

Cultural heritage tourism is especially popular in the country, with many foreign tourists visiting the ancient Hindu temple of Angkor Wat located in the Siem Reap province. Other popular tourist attractions include the Royal Palace, Phnom Penh, as well as ecotourism spots such as Tonlé Sap Lake and the Mekong River.

The tourism industry in Cambodia has been perpetuated by the development of important transportation infrastructure; in particular Cambodia's two international airports in Phnom Penh and Siem Reap respectively. To the Cambodian economy, tourism has been a means for the accumulation of foreign currency earnings and employment for the Cambodian workforce, with about 250,000 jobs generated in 2006. Meanwhile, challenges to the industry include leakage of revenue to foreign markets due to a dependence on foreign goods as well as the prevalence of the Child sex tourism industry.

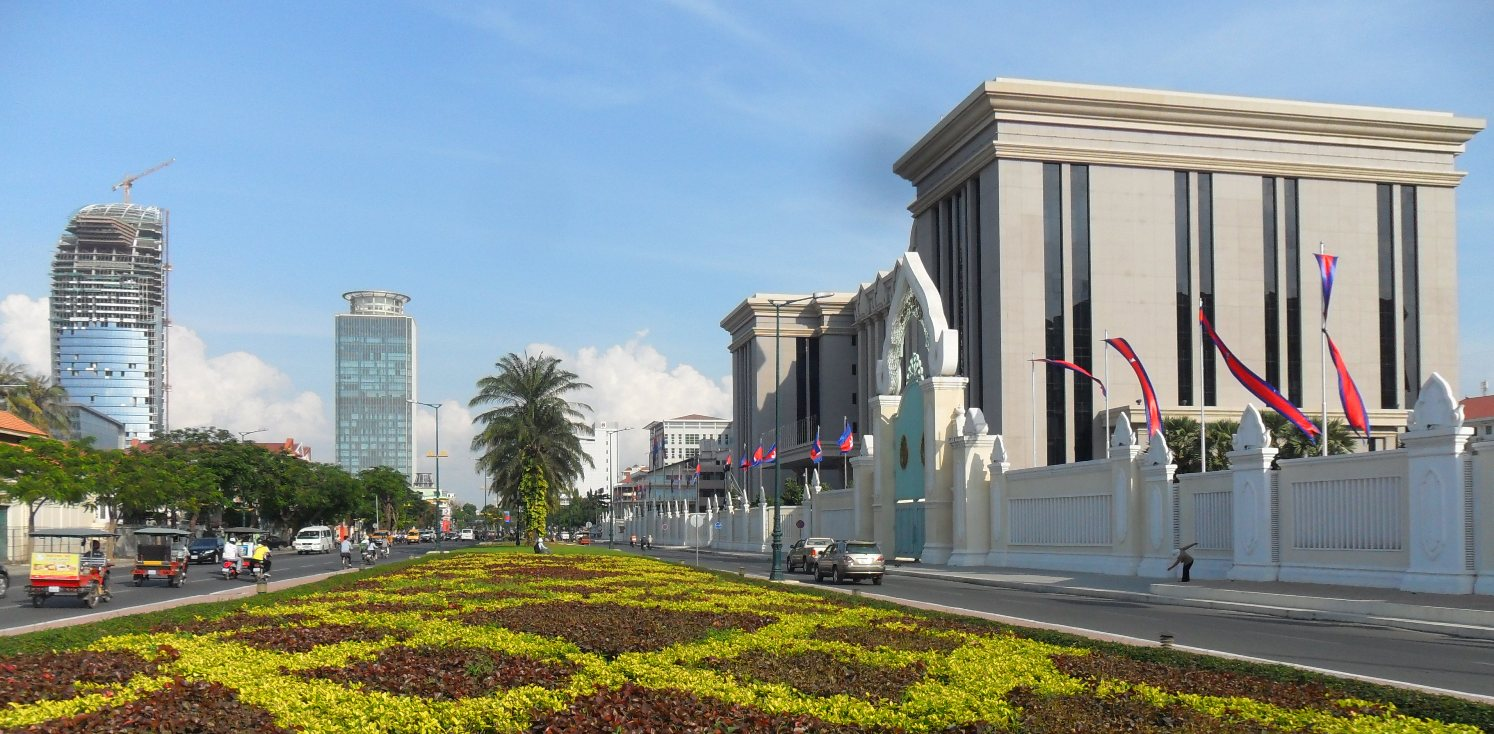
Russian Federation Boulevard in Phnom Penh.

=== Construction ===
The increase in tourist arrivals has led to growing demand for hotels and other forms of accommodation surrounding tourist hotspots. Siem Reap in particular has seen a construction boom in recent years. The capital Phnom Penh has also witnessed a growth in the construction and real estate sectors. Recently, planned projects that have been on the pipeline for several years have been shelved temporarily due to a reduction in foreign investment. From 2009, the Cambodian government has allowed foreigners to own condominiums. This has helped in attracting real estate investors from Thailand, Malaysia, Singapore and other countries.

The construction sector attracted investment of $2.1 billion in 2012 which is a 72 per cent rise compared with 2011. Construction licenses issued stood at 1,694 projects in 2012, which was 20% lower than 2011 but they were higher in value.

=== Mining ===
Oil seeps were discovered in Cambodia as early as the 1950s by Russian and Chinese geologists. Development of the industry was delayed, however, by the Vietnam and Cambodian Civil Wars and the political uncertainty that followed. Further discoveries of oil and natural gas deposits offshore in the early 2000s led to renewed domestic and international interest in Cambodia's production possibilities. As of 2013, the US company Chevron, Japanese JOGMEC and other international companies maintained production sites both on shore and off. Chevron alone had invested over US$160 million and drilled 18 wells.

Sok Khavan, acting director general of the Cambodian National Petroleum Authority, estimated that once the contracts are finalized and legal issues resolved, the Cambodian government will receive approximately 70% of the revenues, contributing to an economy in which the GDP is projected to increase five-fold by 2030. In addition, there are 10,000 square miles offshore in the Gulf of Thailand that holds potential reserves of 12-14 trillion cubic feet of natural gas and an unspecified amount of oil. The rights to this territory are currently a subject of dispute between Cambodia and Thailand, further delaying any possible production developments. In early 2013 it was reported that the two countries were close to a deal that would allow joint production to begin.

=== Education ===
Education in Cambodia is controlled by the state through the Ministry of Education in a national level and by the Department of Education at the provincial level. The Cambodian education system includes pre-school, primary, secondary education, higher education and non-formal education. The education system includes the development of sport, information technology education, research development and technical education. School enrollment has increased during the 2000s in Cambodia. USAID data shows that in 2011 primary enrollment reached 96% of the child population, lower secondary school 34% and upper secondary 21%.

The Human Rights Measurement Initiative (HRMI) finds that Cambodia is fulfilling only 68.2% of what it should be fulfilling for the right to education based on the country's level of income. HRMI breaks down the right to education by looking at the rights to both primary education and secondary education. While taking into consideration Cambodia's income level, the nation is achieving 86.2% of what should be possible based on its resources (income) for primary education but only 50.4% for secondary education.

=== Healthcare ===
Life expectancy in Cambodia

The quality of health in Cambodia is rising along with its growing economy. The public health care system has a high priority from the Cambodian government and with international help and assistance, Cambodia has seen some major and continuous improvements in the health profile of its population since the 1980s, with a steadily rising life expectancy.

A health reform of Cambodia in the 1990s, successfully improved the health of the population in Cambodia, placing Cambodia on a track to achieve the Millennium Development Goal targets set forth by the United Nations. One such example is the Cambodian Health Equity Fund, largely financed by the country itself, created in 2000 to increase access to free health care to around 3 million poor people. The Fund, which pays for traveling expense and even daily allowance for anyone accompanying a patient, has resulted in increasing health care seeking among Cambodians who otherwise could not afford any kind of medical care. As a result of the reform, mortality rates significantly dropped. Similarly, life expectancy at birth in 2010 was 62.5 years, a 1.6 folds increase from 1980.

The Cambodian population and healthcare system struggles with many of the diseases common to the Tropics, in particular in rural areas. In addition, malnutrition of children has long been a major problem. HIV became an increasing problem in 1998, but the epidemic has since been almost curbed.

The Human Rights Measurement Initiative finds that Cambodia is fulfilling 81.2% of what it should be fulfilling for the right to health based on its level of income. When looking at the right to health with respect to children, Cambodia achieves 96.8% of what is expected based on its current income. In regards to the right to health amongst the adult population, the country achieves only 89.7% of what is expected based on the nation's level of income. Cambodia falls into the "very bad" category when evaluating the right to reproductive health because the nation is fulfilling only 57.1% of what the nation is expected to achieve based on the resources (income) it has available.

=== Banking ===
This is a list of banks in Cambodia.

As of July 31, 2020, there were 51 commercial banks, 14 specialized banks, 75 microfinance institutions, 7 microfinance deposit-taking institutions, 6 representative offices, and 15 leasing companies in Cambodia.

As of September 30, 2021, there were 54 commercial banks, 10 specialized banks, 79 microfinance institutions, 6 microfinance deposit-taking institutions, 6 representative offices, and 17 financial leasing companies in Cambodia.

As of June 20, 2022, according to the National Bank of Cambodia there are 58 commercial banks in Cambodia.

There are no significant barriers to bank entry. At the end of 2013, there stood 35 commercial banks. Since 2011 new banks with offshore funding have begun to enter the market.

=== Illicit ===
Cyber scam center operations in Cambodia have transformed parts of the country, notably areas like Bokor Mountain, Sihanoukville, Ream City, and Dara Sakor, into centers for a brutal online fraud industry. This illicit industry, primarily controlled by Chinese billionaires, operates with the complicity of high-ranking Cambodian political elites who not only profit from it but also facilitated its development through infrastructure projects. The origins of this industry trace back to Cambodia's participation in China's Belt and Road Initiative around 2013. This led to a surge of Chinese investment in infrastructure and real estate, including special economic zones (SEZs) and mega-casinos. Many of these "developers" were later revealed to be fugitives or individuals with criminal backgrounds, some of whom have since faced international sanctions. With China's 2019 ban on online gambling and the subsequent COVID-19 pandemic, many of these empty facilities pivoted to online scamming. This period saw a significant increase in human trafficking, with an estimated 100,000 people, primarily foreign nationals, trafficked into Cambodia by September 2023.

A 2024 study found that funds stolen by criminal syndicates in Cambodia was estimated to exceed $12.5 billion annually—half the country’s formal GDP, based on a very conservative estimate. Many scam compounds in Cambodia are owned by local elites There are lucrative incentives for these elites to associate with and materially support criminal activity, often hidden behind legitimate-seeming fronts like casinos, resorts, and special economic zones (SEZs). Criminal groups have established complex money-laundering operations to move illicit funds into the formal economy, indicating a flow of fraudulent funds that can potentially corrupt international financial institutions and legitimate sectors of the economy.

NagaWorld in Phnom Penh

Gambling in Cambodia is officially illegal under the 1996 Law on Suppression of Gambling, which outlawed all unauthorized forms of gambling and provided for penalties ranging from monetary fines to short prison sentences, although the Cambodian government's General Department of Prisons does not list gambling as one of the 28 offenses punishable by imprisonment.

The prohibition on gambling, which also extends to all forms of online gambling, only applies to Cambodian citizens. As of October 2015, there were 75 casinos catering to foreign tourists operating within Cambodia, providing an estimated US$29 million in revenue to the national government in the first nine months of the year and $2 billion in income for the casinos. Cambodian citizens are allowed to gamble through government sponsored gaming including five separate privately run national lotteries. Cambodians were also previously permitted to play the slot machines located in the nation's casinos, however due to complaints of violence related to gambling debts and widespread problem gambling, slot machines were banned in 2009.

Gambling as a popular pastime is ingrained in Southeast Asian culture in general and Cambodian culture in particular. Men who don't gamble are often viewed as not masculine. Consequently, despite the laws against citizens gambling, illegal gambling is widespread in Cambodia. The police forces in Cambodia, ruled by one of the most corrupt governments in the world, often look the other way as casinos freely allow locals to enter and provide private rooms for government and law enforcement officials, who oftentimes have a vested financial interest in the casinos, to conduct illegal gambling.

Extralegal activities are also widespread outside of the permitted casinos ranging from cockfights and card rooms to sports book (primarily regional football and Kun Khmer matches) and unauthorized lotteries. Most of these activities are controlled by organized crime and protected by bribes to law enforcement.

A number of societal issues plague Cambodia as a result of gambling, most notably gambling addiction.

=== Other industry ===
Cambodia is encouraging Chinese investment in Electric vehicle assembly plants. Cambodia's 2022 Long-Term Strategy for Carbon Neutrality to have 40% EV cars and busses and 70% electric motorbikes by 2050. It has significantly reduced import duties on EVs.

As of 2025, The food and beverage industry in Cambodia was valued at $901 million. This includes Cambodian brands like Khmer Beverages, Cambrew, and FN Beverages Cambodia (makers of Oyoshi green tea) as well as international brands like Coca-Cola and Heineken.

== Infrastructure ==
=== Telecommunications ===
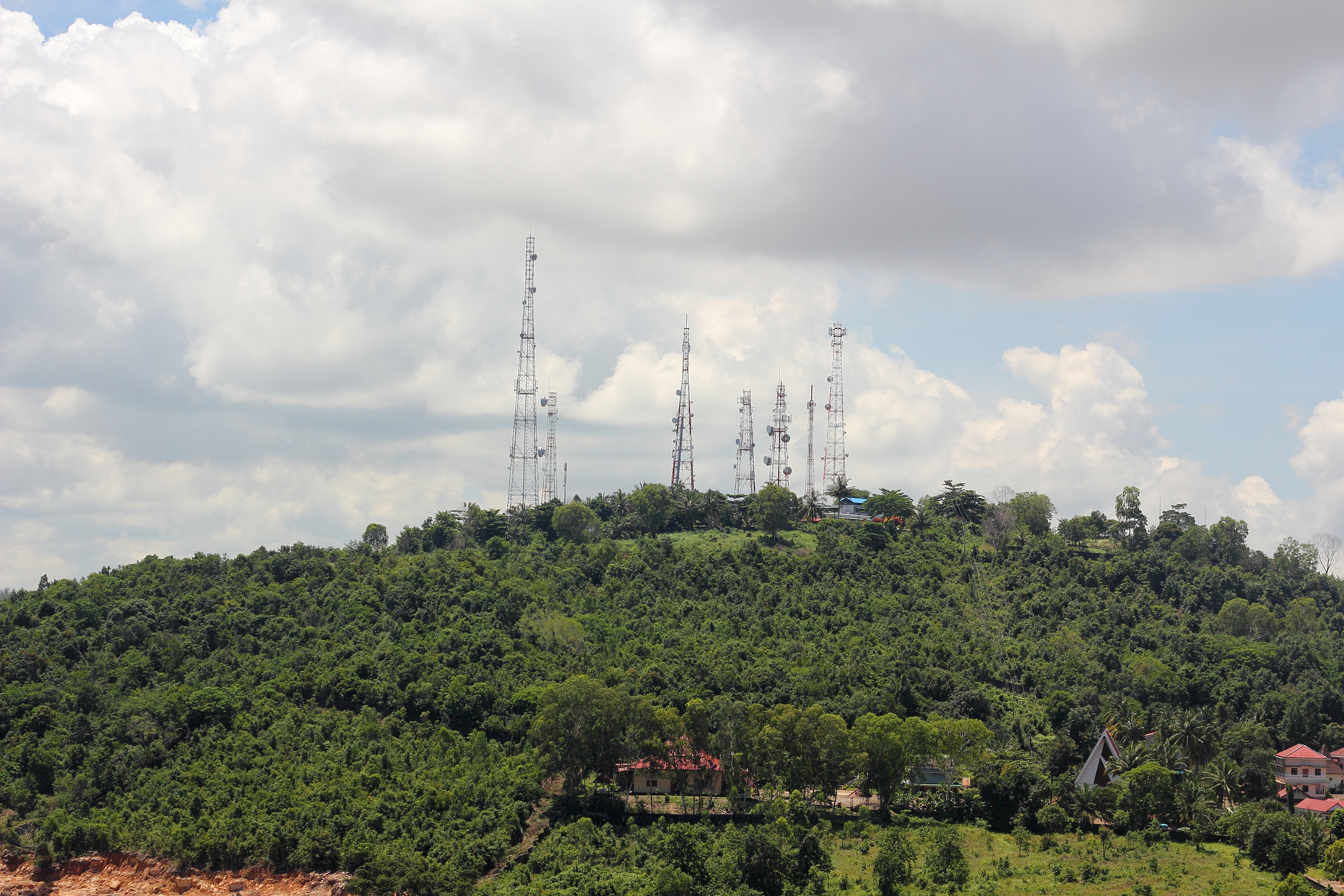
Sihanoukville - communication towers.

Telecommunications in Cambodia include telephone, radio, television, and Internet services, which are regulated by the Ministry of Posts and Telecommunications. Transport and posts were restored throughout most of the country in the early 1980s during the People's Republic of Kampuchea regime after being disrupted under Democratic Kampuchea (Khmer Rouge).

In January 1987, the Soviet-aided Intersputnik space communications station began operation in Phnom Penh and established two-way telecommunication links between the Cambodian capital and the cities of Moscow, Hanoi, Vientiane, and Paris. The completion of the earth satellite station restored the telephone and telex links among Phnom Penh, Hanoi, and other countries for the first time since 1975. Although telecommunications services were initially limited to the government, these advances in communications helped break down the country's isolation, both internally and internationally.

Today, with the availability of mobile phones, communications are open to all, though the country's former Prime Minister Hun Sen decreed that 3G mobile phones would not be allowed to support video calling.

As of 2019, the number of internet users in Cambodia rose to 15.8 million, about 98.5% of the population. According to the Telecommunications Regulator of Cambodia (TRC), the number of registered SIM cards rose by 9.4 percent during the first half of the year, reaching 20.8 million. The SIM card market is saturated, with Cambodia now having more active SIM cards than people. According to TRC, there are six telecommunications firms in the country: Cellcard, Smart Axiata, Metfone, Seatel, Cootel, and qb. Three companies, Metfone, Cellcard, and Smart, account for 90% of users. TRC noted that, as of February 2019, Facebook had seven million users in Cambodia.

=== Energy ===
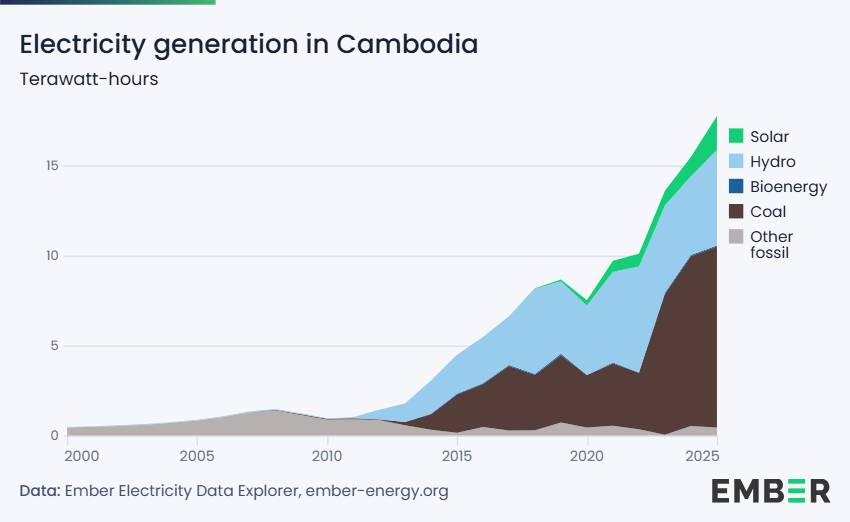
Electricity generation in Cambodia in terawatt-hours

Energy in Cambodia covers the energy sources used in the country including renewables, fossil fuels, biomass, and hydro-power.

Cambodia had, in 2024, 5044 MW of electricity capacity installed. According to the IEA, Cambodia is the second least electrified country in the region. The main sources of generation are coal and hydro, with 59% of total generation coming from coal. The coal is imported, with 67% of total energy (including oil and gas) being imported as of 2023, an over 800% growth since 2000.

Energy security in Cambodia is vulnerable to transport shocks like the war in Ukraine and the 2026 war in Iran. As of 2025, the high ratio of coal in the economy was a driver of high fossil fuel emissions incompatible with the long term nationally determined contribution commitments.

Energy consumption in Cambodia has been increasing about 20% a year. Domestic production of energy is mostly concentrated in burning biofuels, with limited ability to expand hydro production. In order to meet the demand growth and reduce emissions, the country has set a goal for 70% production from renewables, with solar expanding rapidly in recent years. This planning is governed by the Clean Cambodia Strategy and Power Development Plan, which is overseen by the Ministry of Mines and Energy.

Cambodia has significant potential for developing renewable energy and could potentially run its energy system on 100% renewable sources. The country, however, remains one of the few countries in the ASEAN region that has not adopted renewable energy targets. To attract more investment in renewable energy Cambodia could adopt targets, improve renewable energy governance, develop a regulatory framework, improve project bankability and facilitate market entry for international investors. Due to high vulnerability to climate change, it is recommended that Cambodia focuses on developing renewable energy away from fossil fuels as part of climate change mitigation measures.

=== Transport ===
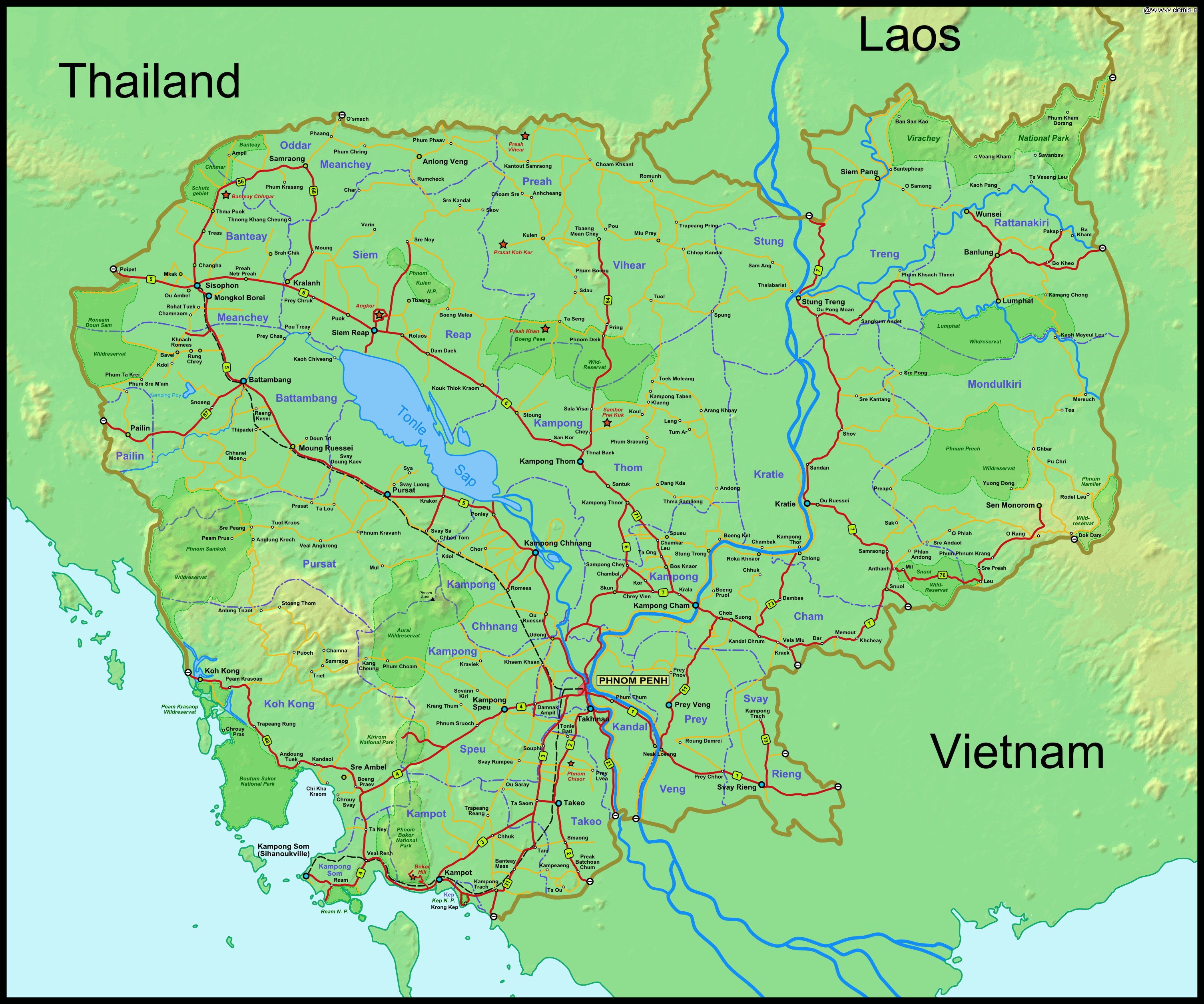
A national transport map of Cambodia

The system of transport in Cambodia, was rudimentary in the past, severely damaged in the chaos that engulfed the nation in the latter half of the 20th century. The country's weak transport infrastructure hindered emergency relief efforts, exacerbating the logistical issues of procurement of supplies in general and their distribution. Cambodia received Soviet technical assistance and equipment to support the maintenance of the transportation network. In the last twenty years, however, significant improvements have been made, including an expressway, almost all of the major roads being paved, and two new major international airports - one in Siem Reap and one in Phnom Penh. Furthermore, ground has been broken on a canal that will allow cargo to go directly to the ocean, as well as planned new train lines.

=== Water supply and sanitation ===
Water supply in Cambodia is characterized by a low level of access in rural areas compared to relatively high access to an improved water source in urban areas. In 2015, 76% of the population had access to "improved" water, 100% in urban areas and 76% in rural areas. Still, in 2015, around 9 million did not have access to "improved" water.

Within the government, urban water supply policy is the responsibility of the Ministry of Industry, Mines and Energy. Service provision in urban areas is the responsibility of two water utilities in the largest cities, the Phnom Penh Water Supply Authority (PPWSA) and the Siem Reap Water Supply Authority (SRWSA), 11 Provincial Water Supply Authorities (known as PWWKs) as well as 147 smaller utilities. The Department of Rural Water Supply (DRWS) and Department of Rural Health Care (DRHC) of the Ministry of Rural Development are responsible for rural water supply for the smaller towns and villages with less than 1,000 households.

The performance of the Provincial Water Supply Authorities, measured in terms of access, cost recovery through tariff revenues and non-revenue water, lags behind the performance of PPWSA which has improved its performance significantly in the late 1990s and early 2000s. In 2012 the government of Cambodia launched a plan to bring the performance of the provincial utilities to levels comparable to those achieved by PPWSA by 2015, including their financial autonomy.

In 2012 the Asian Development Bank approved a grant to provide technical assistance to the Ministry of Industry, Mines and Energy to support this process. Many international NGOs provide support for drinking water supply in Cambodia through local NGOs, including Oxfam in Pursat Province or Water for Cambodia that installs biosand filters in rural areas, runs the only water-testing laboratory outside the capital and promotes water literacy.

== Child labour ==
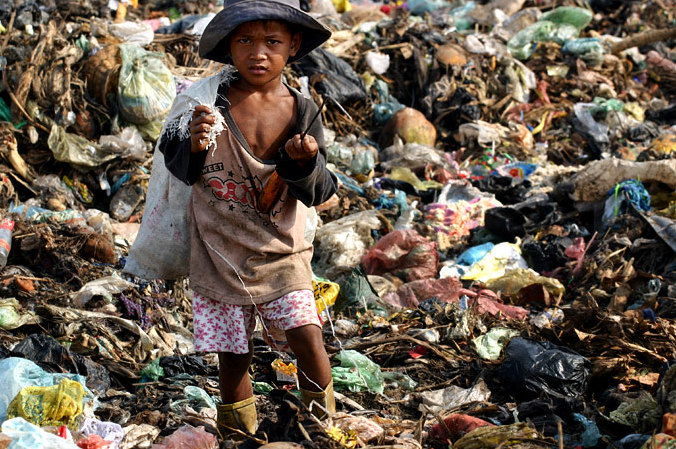
A Cambodian child scavenging in a landfill site.

Child labour refers to the full-time employment of children under a minimum legal age. In 2003, an International Labour Organization (ILO) survey reported that one in every ten children in the capital above the age of seven was engaged in child domestic labour. Children who are too young to work in the fields work as scavengers. They spend their days rummaging in dumps looking for items that can be sold for money. Children also often work in the garment and textile industry, in prostitution, and in the military.

In Cambodia, the state had ratified both the Minimum Age Convention (C138) in 1999 and Worst Forms of Child Labour Convention (C182) in 2006, which are adopted by the International Labour Organization (ILO). For the former convention, Cambodia had specified the minimum age to work to be at age 14. Yet, significant levels of child labour appear to be found in Cambodia.

In 1998, ILO estimated that 24.1% of children in Cambodia aged between 10 and 14 were economically active. Many of these children work long hours and Cambodia Human Development Report 2000 reported that approximately 65,000 children between the ages of 5 and 13 worked 25 hours a week and did not attend school. There are also many initiative and policies put in place to decrease the prevalence of child labour such as the United States generalized system of preferences, the U.S.-Cambodia textile agreement, ILO Garment Sector Working Conditions Improvement Project, and ChildWise Tourism.

There is a need to eliminate child labour in Cambodia as a report by UNICEF states that child labourers could be missing out on education. When children do not attend school, they are denied the knowledge and skills needed for national development. Without education and vital life skills, they are vulnerable to abuse and exploitation, which may exacerbate the existing cycle of poverty in their families. Consequently, this lack in productivity due to lack of education will hold back economic growth in Cambodia.

== Challenges for industrial development ==
Although Cambodia exports mainly garments and products from agriculture and fisheries, it is striving to diversify the economy. There is some evidence of expansion in value-added exports from a low starting point, largely thanks to the manufacture of electrical goods and telecommunications by foreign multinationals implanted in the country. Between 2008 and 2013, high-tech exports climbed from just US$3.8million to US$76.5 million.

There are difficulties for Cambodia to enhance the technological capacity of the many small and medium-sized enterprises (SMEs) active in agriculture, engineering and the natural sciences. Whereas the large foreign firms in Cambodia that are the main source of value-added exports tend to specialize in electrical machinery and telecommunications, for firms of smaller size and across other sectors, skills and innovation spillovers from large operators may need to be facilitated by science and technology policy.

There is little evidence that the Law on Patents, Utility Model Certificates and Industrial Designs (2006) has been of practical use, thus far, to any but the larger foreign firms operating in Cambodia. By 2012, 27 patent applications had been filed, all by foreigners. Of the 42 applications for industrial design received up to 2012, 40 had been filed by foreigners. Nevertheless, the law has no doubt encouraged foreign firms to introduce technological improvements to their on-shore production systems, which can only be beneficial.

Under the mandate of the United Nations Transitional Authority in Cambodia (UNTAC), $1.72 billion (1.72 G$) of foreign aid was spent in an effort to bring basic security, stability and democratic rule to the country. Various news and media reports suggest that since 1993 the country has been the recipient of some US$10 billion in foreign aid.

With regards to economic assistance, official donors had pledged $880 million at the Ministerial Conference on the Rehabilitation of Cambodia (MCRRC) in Tokyo in June 1992. In addition to that figure, $119 million was pledged in September 1993 at the International Committee on the Reconstruction of Cambodia (ICORC) meeting in Paris, and $643 million at the March 1994 ICORC meeting in Tokyo.

Cambodia experienced a shortfall in foreign aid in the year 2005 due to the government's failure to pass anti-corruption laws, opening up a single import/export window, increasing its spending on education, and complying with policies of good governance. In response, the government adopted the National Strategic Development Plan for 2006–10 (also known as the “Third Five-Year Plan”). The plan focused on three major areas:

- the speeding up of economic growth at an annual rate of 6-7%
- eradicating corruption
- developing public structures in favor of quality (i.e. by education, training, and healthcare) over quantity (i.e. rapid population growth)

== Trade - EBA Issues ==
Exports of Cambodia by product category (2019) Chemical products Transportation Machines Mineral products Plastics and rubbers Metals Foodstuffs Precious metals Textiles Instruments Animal products Vegetable products Paper goods Footwear and headwear Miscellaneous Stone and glass Wood products Animal and vegetable bi-products Animal hides Arts and antiques Weapons

The announcement from February 12, 2020, was to suspend "Everything But Arms" (EBA) trade preferences between EU and Cambodia. The country has known to be the second largest beneficiary from EBA's program. The EU's preliminary conclusion sent to Cambodian government on November 12, 2019, because Cambodia failed to address serious human and labor rights concerns under Human Rights Watch. Moreover, the issue behind ending the opposition party (CNRP) and dropping charges against the leader of CNRP violated the right to freedom of expression.

== Statistics ==
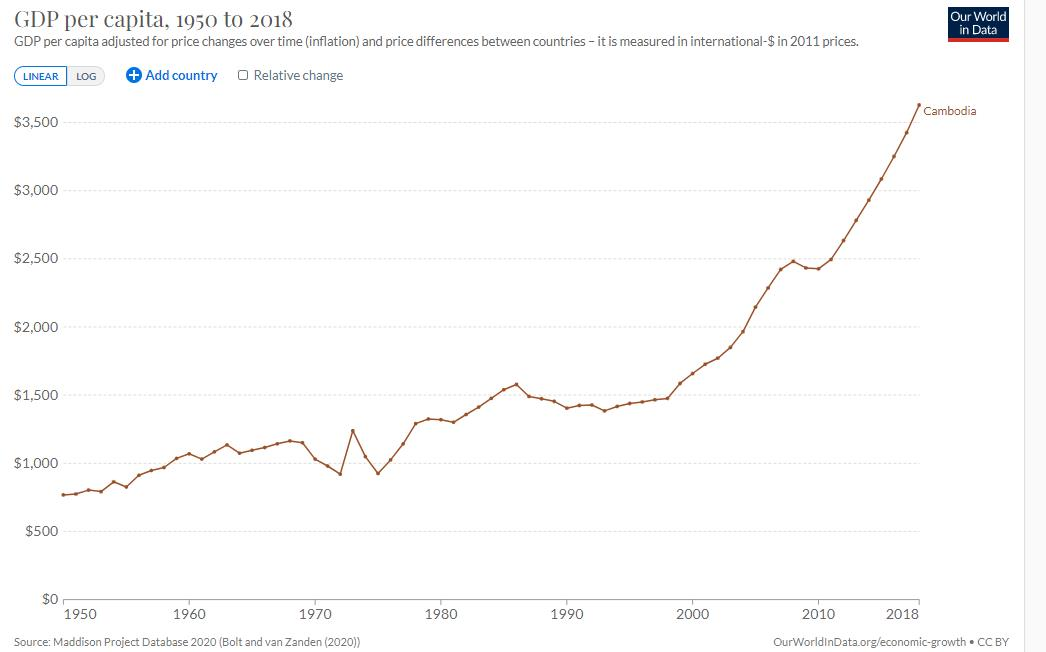
Real GPD per capita development of Cambodia

Investment (gross fixed)
3% of GDP (2011 est.)
Household income or consumption by percentage share

- lowest 10%: 2.6%
- highest 10%: 23.7% (2011)

Agriculture - products

- rice,
- rubber,
- corn,
- vegetables,
- cashews,
- tapioca,
- silk

Industries

- tourism, garments, construction, rice milling, fishing, wood and wood products, rubber, cement, gem mining, textiles

Industrial production growth rate

- 5.7% (2011 est.)

Electricity

...	2010	2011
production	1.273 billion kWh	0.998 billion kWh
consumption	1.272 billion kWh	2.3billion kWh
exports	0 kWh	0kWh
imports	274 million kWh	1.768 billion kWh

Exchange rates

Year	Riels (KHR) per US dollar
2012	4,097
2011	4,395.62
2010	4,145
2009	4,139.33
2008	4,070.94
2007	4,006
2006	4,103

== Online scam operations ==
Cambodia has been identified by United Nations agencies, human-rights organisations and international media as a significant location for online scam operations in Southeast Asia. These operations have included scam compounds linked to human trafficking, forced labour and cyber-enabled fraud.

The United Nations Human Rights Office reported that people had been trafficked into online scam operations in Southeast Asia and forced to participate in criminal activity, including romance-investment scams, crypto fraud, money laundering and illegal gambling. The Associated Press reported on the same United Nations findings that hundreds of thousands of people in Southeast Asia had been coerced into online scam operations, including in Cambodia.

In 2025, Amnesty International reported that it had identified more than 50 scam compounds in Cambodia where people were allegedly subjected to slavery, human trafficking, child labour and torture. Reuters reported Amnesty International's findings, stating that the organisation accused the Cambodian government of enabling a brutal scam industry, while Cambodian officials rejected the allegations and said authorities had taken enforcement action against such operations.

== See also ==
- List of companies of Cambodia
- Corruption in Cambodia
- Oknha
- Dara Sakor
- Science and technology in Cambodia
- Cambodia Development Cooperation Forum
- Ministry of Economy and Finance (Cambodia)
- Ministry of Commerce (Cambodia)
- Ministry of Industry, Science, Technology and Innovation (Cambodia)
- Bamboo network
- ASEAN–China Free Trade Area
- ASEAN Free Trade Area
- Belt and Road Initiative
- Cambodia–Laos–Vietnam Development Triangle Area
- Special Economic Zones of Cambodia
- Cambodia–China relations#Commerce
- European Chamber of Commerce in Cambodia
- Cambodia and the International Monetary Fund
- Cambodia and the World Bank

== Sources ==
This article incorporates text from a free content work. Licensed under CC-BY-SA IGO 3.0. Text taken from UNESCO Science Report: towards 2030, 698-713, UNESCO, UNESCO Publishing.
