= International French School (Singapore) =

- Lycée Français de Singapour
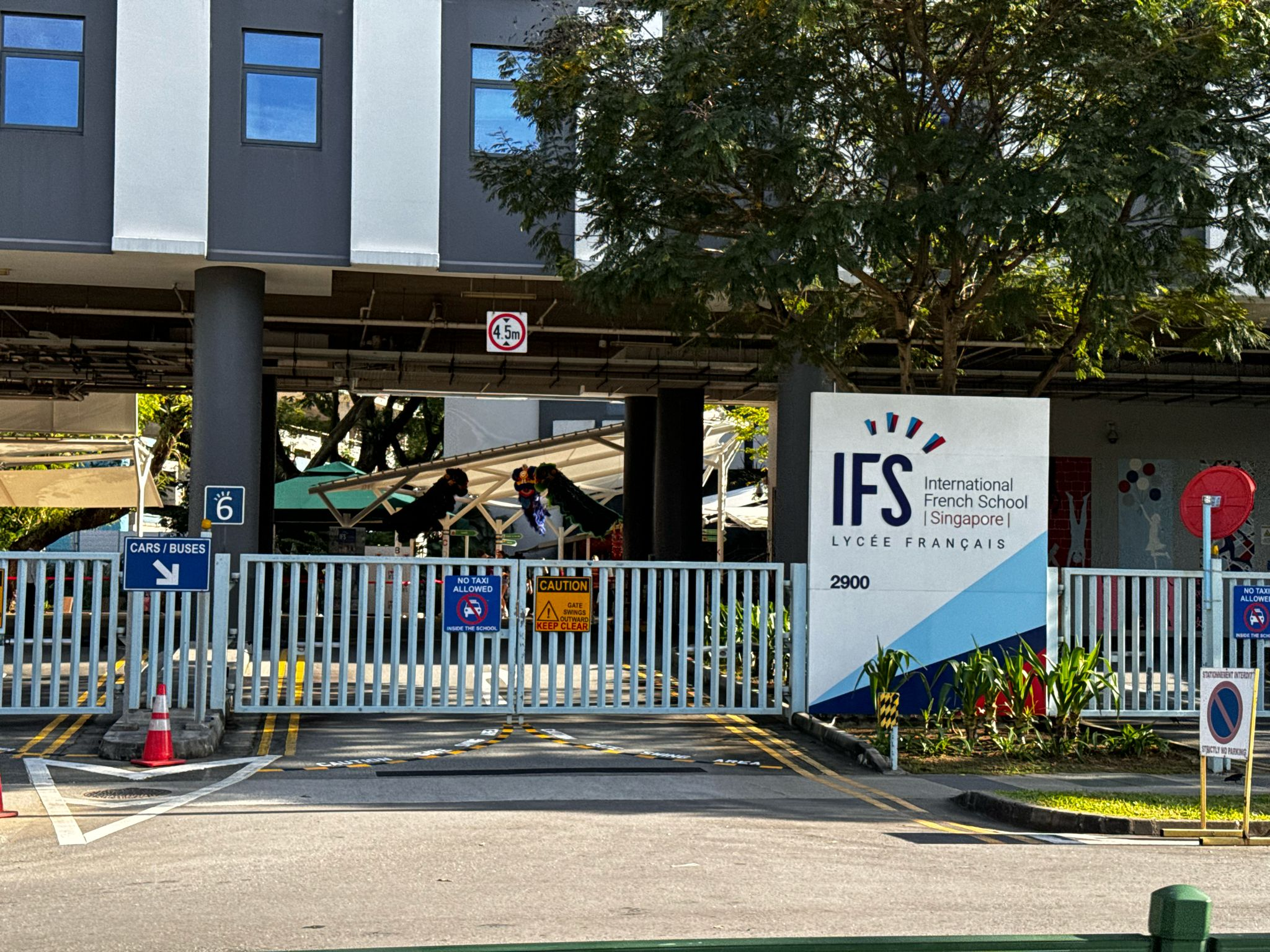
- Entrance to the International French School's elementary school campus

Location
- Reception & Elementary: 2900 Ang Mo Kio Avenue 3 Singapore 569935; Kindergarten & Secondary: 3000 Ang Mo Kio Avenue 3 Singapore 569928; Singapore; 1.3714°N 103.8676°E

Information
- School type: Private International School
- Motto: "Open Your Mind"
- Established: 1967
- School district: Singapore
- Principal: Samuel Jourdan
- Enrollment: ~3,000 students
- Language: French, English, Chinese, German, Spanish, Latin
- Campus: Urban
- Campus size: ~54,000 square meters
- Colors: Light blue, dark blue, white, and red
- Website: https://www.ifs.edu.sg/

International French School (Singapore), abbreviated as IFS (French: Lycée Français de Singapour, LFS) is a French international school in Singapore certified by the French Ministry of Education. Operational for over 50 years, IFS delivers a bilingual French-English education for international students aged 2 to 18, from kindergarten to high school. Its campus, located along Ang Mo Kio Avenue 3, has 54,000 square metres (580,000 sq ft) of space.

== History ==
The predecessor of this institution opened in 1967. 13 years later, several French companies spent three million Singapore dollars to establish and create an established French international school, and in September 1984 the school opened in a Bukit Tinggi campus. Around 1993 the primary school moved to a rental property on Thomson Road due to growth at the school, and in that year the school began establishing plans for a new campus.

The former 118,033-square-foot (10,965.6 m^{2}) campus was rented from the Swiss Club of Singapore with a lease of a duration of 100 years. In 1998, when the property still had 85 years left, the property was offered on the selling market.

The Ang Mo Kio Avenue 3 facility began operations in 1999. At a later point, the school began an expansion project so the campus could house 2,400 students; as part of the project, there would be 26 additional classrooms in a structure built on top of the previous kindergarten facility. The primary CP/CP1 and kindergarten levels were temporarily moved to the former Serangoon Garden South School facility. The secondary school offers an international option of the baccalaureate, which is an honor course for this exam. It has been for many years forming students for Ivy Leagues and prépa Parisienne.

In 2010, 1,400 students were enrolled into the school.

In 2016 the school opened a separate campus on Ang Mo Kio 2900 for the primary students. They are now looking forward to adding another building on the primary campus to be able to transfer the kindergarten kids from the middle school and high school campus to the primary one. In January 2020 the school had officially changed from 'Lycée Français de Singapour' to 'International French School of Singapore'.

In 2023 the school started a extension project near the elementary school campus. It is Singapore's first zero-energy kindergarten. The project officially completed in 2025 and opened in 2026. It holds three building all with three stories, has mural art and the buildings hold a style concept similar to villas.

== Student body and teaching staff ==
Today the student body is made of over 3,000 pupils from over 65 different nationalities, with most coming from France and other French-speaking countries or regions. Very few Singaporean students attend the school as the Singaporean government's regulations prevent most of its citizens from attending international schools within the country.

== Community ==
Circa 2010, the housing facility Serangoon Gardens attracted members of the school community as the housing is close to the school. A French community in Serangoon Gardens developed around the school.

== Alumni ==
- Chea Serey, General Director of the National Bank of Cambodia
- Joaquin Ignacio Salas Villanueva
- Ivan Boue - Ramirez
- Simon Derien
