= Serey (name) =

Serey is a given name and surname. Notable people with the name include:

- Chea Serey (born 1981), Cambodian economist
- Ros Serey Sothea (c. 1948–1977), Cambodian singer
- Serey Dié (born 1984), Ivorian footballer
