= Trade Union Federation Khmer Worker League =

Trade union of garment workers in Cambodia

TUFKWL
- Predecessor: TUKIFEL
- Founded: 2010
- Location: Cambodia
- Members: 1,589 (2015)

The Trade Union Federation Khmer Worker League (TUFKWL) is a trade union of garment workers in Cambodia. The union was established in 2010 and represents 1,589 members in three local unions. The leader of TUFKWL worked with TUFIKEL before establishing the new union. TUFKWL is affiliated with the Cambodia Confederation of Trade Unions.
