= PhillipCapital =

Company

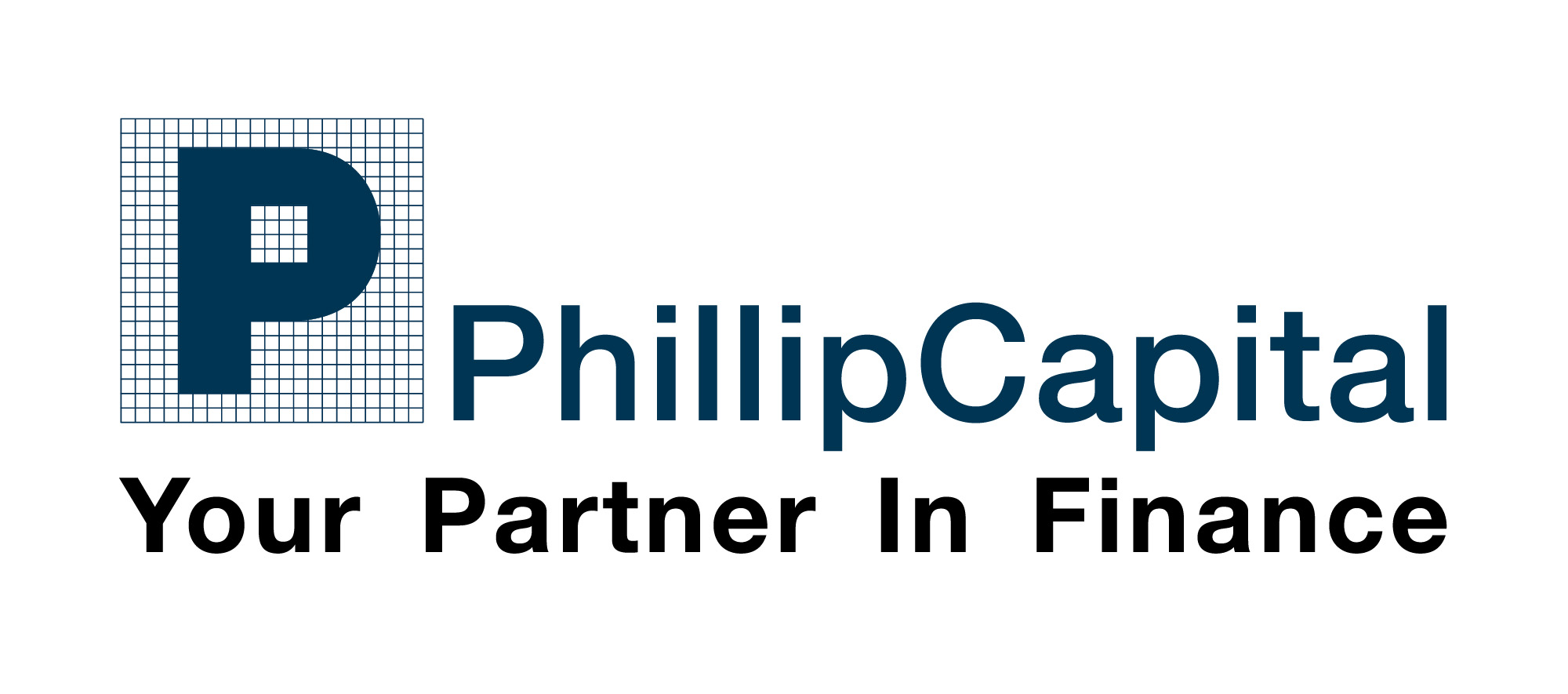
- Type: Private
- Industry: Financial services
- Founded: 1975
- Founder: Lim Hua Min
- Headquarters: Singapore
- Number of locations: 15 countries (Australia, Cambodia, China, Hong Kong, India, Indonesia, Japan, Malaysia, Singapore, Spain, Thailand, Turkey, UK, UAE, USA and Vietnam)
- Key people: Luke Lim (MD of Phillip Securities); Linus Lim (CEO of Phillip Capital Management); Teyu Che Chern (CEO of Phillip Nova)
- Products: POEMS
- Subsidiaries: Phillip Securities
- Website: Official website

PhillipCapital is an investment and wealth management firm, founded in 1975. It offers a wide range of products and services to individuals and institutional clients. It is headquartered in Singapore and operates in 15 locations including the financial hubs of Chicago, London, Tokyo, Hong Kong and Singapore. PhillipCapital serves over 1.5 Million clients with Assets Under Custody exceeding USD 65 Billion. It manages retail and high net worth individuals, family offices, corporate and institutional customers.

== History ==
PhillipCapital was founded as a brokerage firm in 1975. In 1996, it introduced the first Internet trading platform in Singapore, POEMS. The platform has trading access to many other exchanges.

In August 2014, PhillipCapital Group bought Hwang-DBS Commercial Bank in Cambodia for US$40 million and rebranded it as Phillip Bank. It is the third-largest commercial bank branch network in Cambodia, after the National Bank of Cambodia and Ministry of Commerce (MoC) approved the merger between Phillip Bank Plc and Kredit MFI in 2020.

In June 2020, the Australian arm of PhillipCapital Group was acquired by Sequoia Wealth Management.

In January 2022, PhillipCapital Malaysia acquired the securities broking business from Alliance Bank Malaysia, solidifying its presence in the Malaysian financial sector.

In March 2022, PhillipCapital introduced "US Asian Hours", Singapore’s first trading service allowing clients to trade specific US equities during Asian market hours, enhancing market accessibility.

In June 2022, PhillipCapital co-lead the financing round for Singapore-based fintech Helicap.

In February 2023, Phillip Securities Japan signed a comprehensive partnership agreement with Ashikaga City, focusing on promoting financial literacy.

In April 2023, the company launched PCI - US Equity Options and PCI & PST - Fractional US Share trading, providing diversified investment solutions.

In November 2023, Phillip Trustee Cambodia obtained its licence, further expanding the company’s footprint in trust services.

== See also ==
- Phillip Securities
