= Angkor Mikroheranhvatho Kampuchea =

Cambodian microfinance institution

Angkor Mikroheranhvatho (Kampuchea) Co., also known as AMK, is a registered microfinance institution (MFI) headquartered in Phnom Penh, Cambodia with over 280,000 active borrowers.

== History ==
AMK was established in 2002 as a microfinance company to manage Irish NGO Concern Worldwide’s microfinance activities in Cambodia. By 2003, AMK was functioning independently of Concern and subsequently received its license from the National Bank of Cambodia in 2004. In 2010, it became the largest microfinance institution in Cambodia in terms of client numbers, and by 2011, AMK surpassed all other banks and MFIs to become the largest provider of credit in Cambodia in terms of client numbers.

== Microcredit Methodology ==
AMK utilizes a solidarity group lending methodology to administer its group loans. This process begins with potential clients self-selecting themselves into solidarity groups of four to six members. These solidarity groups are then organized into Village Banks that consist of four to twelve groups (or twenty to sixty clients). Being part of a self-selected solidarity group signifies that three to five other villagers trust the loan applicant to let him/her join their group. All loans are guaranteed by the respective group members. Loans are appraised and approved by an AMK Client Officer and the Village Bank President prior to disbursement. Each group nominates a group leader who is in charge of ensuring member attendance at meetings, troubleshooting, and liaising with the VBP, CO, and other members. AMK also offers several individual loan options to its clients. Generally, these require physical collateral and at least one personal guarantor.

== See also ==
- Pete Power
