= Pete Power =

Irish businessman (1969–2018)

Pete Power (1969 - 2018) was the CEO of Angkor Mikroheranhvatho (Kampuchea) Co. (AMK), the largest microfinance institution in Cambodia in terms of borrower numbers. AMK currently provides credit to about 300,000 customers or 10% of the households in Cambodia. Power successfully led AMK and its 1,000 staff through the Great Recession and subsequently embarked on a strategic transformation process to change AMK from a rural credit-only organization to a provider of a broad range of financial services, including savings, credit, money transfers, mobile banking, and various other innovative financial services.

== Biography ==
Power grew up on a dairy farm in Rathgormack, County Waterford, Ireland and attended Rockwell College high school. He was award the first Dermot Harris Memorial Scholarship to the University of Scranton. Power earned a Bachelor of Science in International Relations and Philosophy from the University of Scranton, followed by an MA in European Integration from the University of Limerick.

In 2002, Power co-founded a speciality consulting and software company, Claritee Group. Claritee focused on corporate performance management solutions. After building the company to over $3 million in revenue, Power left Claritee in 2005 and joined the NGO sector.

Power worked as the Financial Systems Manager for Concern Worldwide until 2009 when he became Chief Operating Officer at Prosperity Initiative, a private sector development NGO based in Hanoi, Vietnam. In 2010, Power joined AMK as CEO.

Power was a longtime rugby player, having been associated with Blackthorn Rugby Club for over 20 years.

Power was a regular conference speaker and media commentator on topics such as Microfinance, Business Technology, Globalization, and Project Management.

Power was Chief Executive Officer of Gorta, where he led their merger with Self Help Africa in 2014.

He died in 2018.
