= Cambodian Public Bank =

Commercial bank in Cambodia

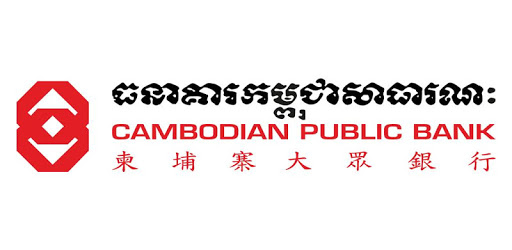
- Industry: Banking and Finance
- Founded: Cambodia (1992)
- Founder: Tan Sri Teh Hong Piow
- Headquarters: Phnom Penh, Cambodia
- Key people: Mr. Ong Ming Teck, Chief Executive Officer
- Products: Financial services
- Owner: Tan Sri Teh Hong Piow
- Parent: Public Bank Berhad
- Website: www.cpbebank.com

Cambodian Public Bank, otherwise known as Campu Bank, is a commercial bank in Cambodia. The bank was established in 1992 and has 30 branches. The bank is owned by the Malaysian Public Bank.

Campu Bank is the largest foreign-owned bank in Cambodia, with assets of $2.1billion.

== See also ==
- List of banks in Cambodia
