= Cambodia and the World Bank =

The World Bank Group (WBG) has operated in Cambodia since October 8, 2004, playing a significant role in Cambodia's development. WBG operates the Emergency Rehabilitation Project. From 1993 to 2017, World Bank projects in Cambodia have focused on economic rehabilitation, agriculture, disease control, health and child welfare. During these years, Cambodia experienced a rise in World Bank projects related to children's welfare and the educational system.

The Total Project Budget Commitment was $243.1 million. $173.2 million is for funding projects from the World Bank and International Development Association (IDA) and the other $69.9 million is for development partner funding via the Cambodia Trust Fund. Twelve projects are active.

== IDA Health Equity Funds ==
The IDA has been a main stakeholder in Cambodia's improvement and capabilities, specifically in the areas of poverty, rural health care, and education. The IDA Health Equity Funds allow 8.46 million more Cambodians to have access to hospitals. As of 2008, only 58% of babies were delivered by trained physicians. IDA funds helped increase that number to 85%.

IDA funds helped with the education and training of 24,577 teachers, as a result of World Bank testing of the Khmer language, with the results showing a deficiency in reading. The IDA helped create the Cambodia Education Sector Support Project, which allowed children to receive assessments to alter the way the teachers would be trained.

== Poverty reduction ==
Cambodia surpassed the Millennium Development Goal in terms of poverty reduction in 2014, dropping the rate from 53% (in 2004) to 20.5% (in 2011).

== See also ==
- Economy of Cambodia
