= Science and technology in Cambodia =

This article summarizes the development of science and technology in Cambodia from a policy perspective.

== Socio-economic context ==
Cambodia is undergoing a transition from a post-conflict state to a market economy. Growth averaged 6.4% per year between 2007 and 2012 and the poverty rate shrank from 48% to 19% of the population, according to the Asian Development Bank's Country Partnership Strategy for 2014 to 2018.

Cambodia exports mainly garments and products from agriculture and fisheries but is attempting to diversify the economy. There is some evidence of expansion in value-added exports from a low starting point, largely thanks to the manufacture of electrical goods and telecommunications by foreign multinationals implanted in the country. Between 2008 and 2013, high-tech exports climbed from US$3.8million to US$76.5 million.

In 2014, the country adopted Cambodia Vision 2030, a plan to turn Cambodia into an upper-middle economy by 2030. In 2015, it adopted the Industrial Development Policy 2015–2025.

Cambodia is a member of the Association of Southeast Asian Nations (ASEAN), which formed a common market in late 2015 called the ASEAN Economic Community. The planned removal of restrictions on the cross-border movement of people and services is expected to spur cooperation in science and technology. The greater mobility of skilled personnel should be a boon for the region and enhance the role of the ASEAN University Network, which counted 30 members in 2016, including the Royal University of Phnom Penh.

== Science and technology policy ==
=== National strategies for science and technology ===
International and civil wars decimated Cambodia's scientific capacity in the 1970s. More recently, Cambodia has been held back by the limited coordination of science and technology across ministries and the absence of any overarching national strategy for science and development. A National Committee for Science and Technology representing 11 ministries has been in place since 1999. Although seven ministries are responsible for the country's 33 public universities, the majority of these institutions come under the umbrella of the Ministry of Education, Youth and Support.

In 2010, the Ministry of Education, Youth and Support approved a Policy on Research Development in the Education Sector. This move represented a first step towards a national approach to research and development across the university sector and the application of research for the purposes of national development.

This policy was followed by the country's first National Science and Technology Master Plan 2014–2020. It was officially launched by the Ministry of Planning in December 2014, as the culmination of a two-year process supported by the Korea International Cooperation Agency. The plan makes provision for establishing a science and technology foundation to promote industrial innovation, with a particular focus on agriculture, primary industry and ICTs.

=== Rectangular Development Strategy ===
Another indication that Cambodia is taking a more co-ordinated approach to science and technology policy and its integration into the country's wider development plans is Phase III of the government's Rectangular Development Strategy for Growth, Employment, Equity and Efficiency: Phase III, which became operational in 2014. This third stage of the strategy is intended to serve as a policy instrument for attaining the objectives of Cambodia Vision 2030 and the country's Industrial Development Policy 2015–2025. The latter were both foreshadowed in the Rectangular Development Strategy of 2013, which is significant for having identified specific roles for science. The Industrial Development Policy 2014–2025 was launched in March 2015 and complemented related medium-term strategies, such as the National Sustainable Development Strategy for Cambodia, published in 2009 with support from the United Nations Environment Programme and Asian Development Bank, and the Climate Change Strategic Plan 2014–2023, published with support from European international development agencies.

The Rectangular Development Strategy sets out four strategic objectives: agriculture; physical infrastructure; private sector development; and human capacity-building. Each of these objectives is accompanied by four priority areas for action. A role for science and technology has been defined in one or more of the priority areas for each ‘rectangle’. Although science and technology are clearly identified as a cross-cutting strategy for promoting innovation for development, it will be important to co-ordinate and monitor the implementation of priority activities and assess the outcome. The key challenge here will be to build a sufficient human resource base in science and engineering to support the ‘rectangular’ targets.

=== Support for industrial innovation ===
The large foreign firms in Cambodia that are the main source of value-added exports tend to specialize in electrical machinery and telecommunications. The principal task for science and technology policy will be to facilitate spillovers from these large operators towards smaller firms and across other sectors like agriculture, in order to strengthen the technical capacity of these smaller firms.

There is little evidence that the Law on Patents, Utility Model Certificates and Industrial Designs (2006) has been of practical use, thus far, to any but the larger foreign firms operating in Cambodia. By 2012, 27 patent applications had been filed, all by foreigners. Of the 42 applications for industrial design received up to 2012, 40 had been filed by foreigners. Nevertheless, the law has no doubt encouraged foreign firms to introduce technological improvements to their on-shore production systems, which can only be beneficial.

== Trends in human resource development ==
Public expenditure on education accounted for 2.6% of GDP in 2010, compared to 1.6% in 2007. The share going to tertiary education remained modest, at 0.38% of GDP or 15% of total expenditure, but it was growing. Despite this, Cambodia still ranked lowest in the region for the education dimension of the World Bank's Knowledge Economy Index.

In 2011, 1.5% of the Cambodian population was enrolled in tertiary education, one of the lowest ratios in Southeast Asia, ahead of Myanmar (1.2% of the population). Only one out of 12 bachelor's students went on to enroll in a master's/PhD program. One-quarter of university graduates (27.5%) were women in 2008.

== Research trends ==
=== Researchers ===
There were 471.3 researchers (in full-time equivalents) in 2015, double the number in 2002 (223).This corresponds to 30.3 per million inhabitants in 2015, almost double the ratio in 2002 (17.6 per million inhabitants). When measured in head counts, one in five researchers (21%) was a woman in 2009.[1]

More than half of research (51%) was performed by the non-profit sector in 2009. Government employees performed another quarter (25%), company employees and academics a further 12% each (12%).

The country's narrow economic and scientific base offers some opportunity for growth tied to food production. However, the diffused responsibility for science and technology across 11 key ministries presents challenges for effective policy development and governance. Although there is evidence of growing collaboration across some key agricultural institutions, such as the Cambodian Agricultural Research and Development Institute and the Royal University of Agriculture, difficulties persist in extending this type of collaboration to a broader range of institutions.

=== Expenditure ===
According to the UNESCO Institute for Statistics, Cambodia spent 0.12% of GDP on research and development (R&D) in 2015.[2] As in many of the world's least developed economies, there is a strong reliance on international aid and non-governmental organizations (NGOs). In 2002, about 28% of research funding came from abroad and as much as 43% from the private non-profit sector. The regulatory environment for NGOs was the focus of parliamentary debate in Cambodia in 2015. It will be interesting to see if any potential legislative change to the regulations reduces the size of investment in research by the not-for-profit sector.

=== Scientific output ===
The number of scientific publications authored by Cambodian scientists and catalogued in international journals grew by 17% on average between 2005 and 2014, a rate surpassed only by Malaysia, Singapore and Viet Nam. They were coming from a low starting point, however, since the volume of publications rose from 54 in 2005 to 206 in 2014. These publications had a narrow focus, with the majority focusing on biological and medical sciences between 2008 and 2014. Cambodia thus had a low publication density, with just 13 articles per million inhabitants in 2014, one of the lowest ratios in Southeast Asia. Only the Philippines (9 per million), Indonesia (6 per million) and Myanmar (1 per million) had a lower publication density. Cambodia was ranked 106th in the Global Innovation Index in 2025.

Cambodia is likely to remain reliant on international research collaboration and NGO support for some time. Between 2008 and 2013, 96% of Cambodian articles involved at least one international co-author, a trend which may explain the country's high citation rate. Of note is that Cambodians count both Asian (Thai and Japanese) and Western scientists (Americans, Britons and French) among their closest collaborators. One strategic policy issue will be how to align NGO research support on national strategic plans for development.
