= Cambodia and the International Monetary Fund =

Cambodia & IMF Overview
- Country population: 16.497 million
- Date of membership: December 31, 1969
- Latest article IV/country report: December 17, 2018
- Special drawing rights (SDR): 88.71 million
- Quota (SDR): 175.0 million
- Number of arrangements: 2
- Constituency managing director: Alisara Mahandana
- Cambodia's resident representative: Yasuhisa Ojima

Cambodia officially joined the IMF on December 31, 1969. After years of internal and external strife, the Cambodian government is currently focusing its attention to rebuilding and renovating the national economy through grants and loans from multilateral sources like the International Monetary Fund. Cambodia gained independence in 1953, which was the starting point of industrialization. Cambodia faced a downhill between 1975 till 1979, which damaged all the infrastructure and economy, economical and a tragic event — genocide which killed millions of innocent citizens and especially the loss of human resources, which caused the Cambodian economy to drop to the lowest point. The Cambodian economy started lively in 1993, hugely relying on the foreign market to export agricultural produce, especially rice. In March 1994, the International Committee for the Reconstruction of Cambodia (ICORC) developed a comprehensive plan in effort to support Washington Consensus policy prescriptions. These reforms aimed to shift the economy from a socialist state-controlled economy towards a capitalistic market-controlled one. Since then they've had a total of two arrangements addressing fiscal management. Directors approved a loan for SDR 28.0 million (about $41 million) in support of Cambodia's 1995-96 macroeconomic and structural reformations. In 1997 domestic political uncertainty following an alleged coup d’état halted IMF disbursements but resumed again in 1998 after the formation of a new government. Since the 1990s there have been no active IMF loans, but Cambodian and IMF relations continue through Technical Assistant strategies and yearly Article IV reports.

== History ==
In order to gain global economic recognition from the International Monetary Fund, Cambodia was required to make fiscal structural reforms that mimic the mechanisms of a liberal-market economy. With that said, Democracy in Cambodia has little to no legitimacy in its economy. Following independence from French colonization in 1954, Cambodia has undergone four major economic and political changes. Firstly, the abdication of the constitutional monarchy in 1955 by Sihanouk established Cambodia as a Socialist state. Then Sihanouk was overthrown by the Lon Nol dictatorship who was supported by the United States. Subsequent to the Vietnam war, President Nixon secretly bombed Cambodia. This bombing invigorated the Khmer Rouge, a communist party, with anti-modernization, and anti-western ideologies. As a result, the Cambodian Civil War and genocide began. The organization ultimately oust Lon Nol and formally established Cambodia as a self-contained communist country. Pol Pot, the Khmer Rouge leader, systemically abolished money, private property, emptied cities and killed approximately 2 million Cambodian citizens. The communist party's goal was to reinstate Cambodia's "golden age" before colonization. The time when Ancient Khmer Empire ruled South-East Asia and heavily relied on the agricultural sector. By December 1978, Cambodia was invaded by Vietnam who implemented Hun Sen, as the new leader of the People's Republic of Kampuchea, a former Khmer Rouge commander. Guerrilla warfare still ensued post-war which cause Cambodia to suffer international economic isolation. In the 1990s the United Nations convened a Paris Conference and achieved a comprehensive international settlement for the Cambodian Conflict. Currently, Cambodia once again is a constitutional monarchy in name but is ruled exclusively by the Coalition government controlled by Hun Sen.

== Everything But Arm (EBA) ==
Everything But Arm is an international trade order created by the European Union to support developing countries with quota-free export of their produce to the EU market. Everything But Arm refers to every product except arms (weapons). With the support from the EU through the EBA policy, Cambodia receives a colossal benefit from zero tariffs on exporting, which draws a ton of investors from other countries, for example, China, in the textile industry. Chinese investors have started investing in Cambodia, which creates job opportunities and training skills for Cambodian workers. However, the EU withdrew the EBA from Cambodia in 2022 due to concerns about human rights issues. The commissioner for Trade, Phil Hogan, said: “We have provided Cambodia with trade opportunities that let the country develop an export-oriented industry and gave jobs to thousands of Cambodians. We stand by their side also now in the difficult circumstances caused by the pandemic. Nonetheless, our continued support does not diminish the urgent need for Cambodia to respect human rights and labor rights. I stand ready to continue our engagement and to restore fully free access to the EU market for products from Cambodia, provided we see substantial improvement in that respect.” (European Commission). With that being said, Cambodians still can export their products into the European market but with the same tariff as many other countries in World Trade Organization, which cause a huge disadvantage to the Cambodian economy.

== Reestablish financial institution ==
Under the Khmer Rouge regime, there was no currency, no bank, and no international trade, which was influenced by Chinese leader Mao Zedong — one party, no private property, and rejecting modern development. After the dark period passed, Cambodia needed to rebuild the country as well as its financial institution. Still, without the framework, it would be a big challenge for the Cambodian government to restructure its government system. Cambodia started from scratch; it took a very long time to restore everything. In 2004, IMF sent the expertise to advise and help the Cambodian government to strengthen its law and fix the banking system. This is a reason why many developing countries want to be a part of an international organization like the IMF, World Bank, or World Trade Organization — less or more; the developing countries gain the benefit from the international organization. With a stable financial institution, there are many great opportunities for foreign investment, which greatly impact Cambodia's economy.

== IMF loans ==
=== First arrangement: 1994 ===
The agreements outline in the Paris Peace Agreements satisfied the conditionality agreements of "Good Governance" according to the IMF standards. The first financial arrangement was approved on May 6, 1994, of a total of 84 million in SDR. The arrangement type is under the Extended Credit Facility (EFC) aimed to assist Cambodia with poverty reduction and growth. Although economic growth projections calculated an approximate 7 percent growth of Cambodian economy there was almost no growth in 1997. The Hun Sen Coup in 1997 increased inflation, and military spending. In 1996 the IMF froze transactions in response to corrupt logging practices and no collection of revenues. Cambodia received only $11.7 million of the 84 million during its three-year contract.

=== Second arrangement: 1999 ===
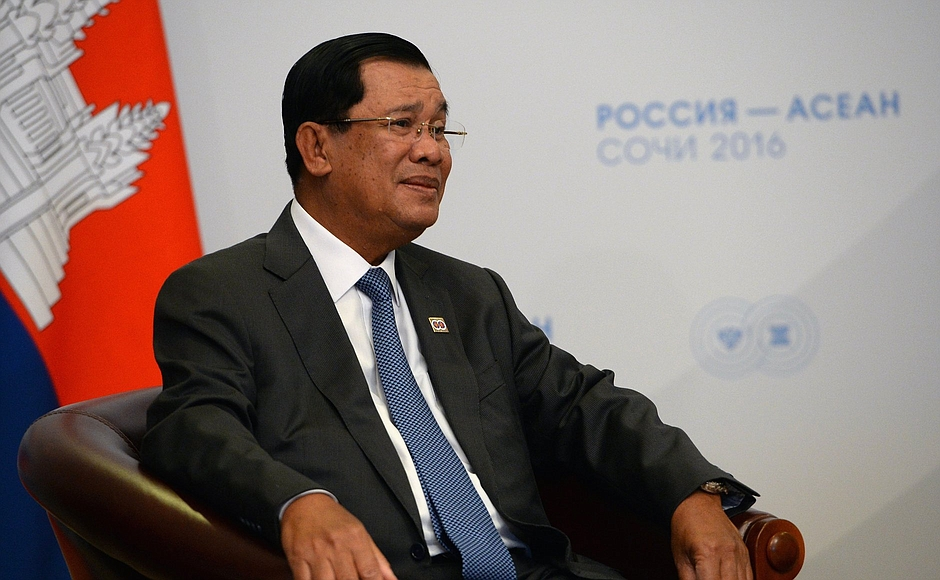
Hun Sen, Cambodia's Prime Minister

Loans began to resume once again on October 22, 1999 when Cambodian authorities in collaboration with International Monetary Fund and World Bank Staff prepared and implemented the "Economic and Financial Policy Framework Paper of 1999–2002.Keat Chhon, Cambodian Minister of Economy and Finance and Chea Chanto Governor of the National Bank of Cambodia believed their economic program will support reconstruction and economic growth of Cambodia by improving social conditions and macroeconomic stability. The Memorandum outlined the formulation of a new government in 1998, and framework objectives focusing on Fiscal Reform. The IMF approved the new policies and estimated an economic growth of 6 percent if the Cambodian government is committed to the policies.

== IMF technical assistance ==
IMF technical Assistance is help from world-class IMF economists who provide expertise and advice on macroeconomic policy issues, central banking, monetary and exchange rate policies, public financing, budgeting, tax policy and administration and statistics.

=== Revenue mobilization strategy 2014–2018 ===
{{primary sources|section}}

- Cambodia's Development vision: Become a higher-middle income country with a per capita income between US$4,000 to UCSD5,000 by 2030.
- The Vision of the Revenue Mobilization Strategy (RMS): Collect domestic revenues efficiently and effectively to meet demands for sustainable-socioeconomic development.
- There are three-pronged strategies for Cambodia's revenue mobilization: improving revenue, implementing fair, efficient tax policies, and strengthening the government. With this strategy, it would create positive results on development and make it easier to keep track of tax collection. Taxation plays a main role in revenue mobilization, for example, income tax and VAT. The tax collection from the company and other business forms helps the government fund and promotes domestic production by imposing a tax on import production.

RMS four main reforms:

1. Promotion of tax culture
2. Improvement of tax and non-tax administration
3. Improvement of tax and non-tax governance
4. Improvement of tax paying services

Strategy success:

Cambodia's Ministry of Economy and Finance implementations of RMS has successfully completed 71 out of 86 RMS tax administration measures, and 15 remaining are in active progress. RMS has improved human resource policies and management, introduced e-payments, improved large taxpayer management, and more. Following its success and expiration in 2018, IMF Staff and Cambodian authorities move to create a new strategy plan in 2019.

The Cambodian state adopted the E-payment system. People have started to transfer money via phone because of the feasibility rather than the tangible physical relocation of currency. There is always the concern that an E-payment is a "beauty cover", nothing actually exists. In a developing country, system users are always concerned about a bank's solvency because an account's status sheet can reflect what is being transferred when nothing has been transferred.

=== Tax administration modernization priorities in 2019–2023 ===
In response to Senior Minister of the Ministry of Economy and Finance (MEF), and Dr. Aun Pornmoniroth from the Fiscal Affairs Department's request for technical assistance, IMF staff Debra Adams, Charlie Jenkins, Patrick De Mets, and Stephen Wilcox formulated Cambodia's "Tax Administration Modernization Priorities in 2019-23".

General department of taxation goals and objectives:

Goals:

1. Promote voluntary compliance and minimize tax burden by providing quality services
2. Ensure taxpayers meet their tax responsibilities by fairly and firmly enforcing the tax law.
3. Deliver high performance by institutional strengthening.

Objectives:

1. Reduce taxpayer burden by developing simple and efficient tax administration processes: Provide accurate tax information, enhance taxpayer education, achieve fair and transparent administration, foster private sector partnership.
2. Identify non-compliant taxpayers and reduce tax evasion by fairly enforcing the law
3. Increase work productivity: Support modernized technology, develop skill proficiency with training, and strengthen institutional capacity development of staff.

== 2019 IMF staff article IV mission to Cambodia ==
One benefit of IMF membership is countries are entitled to technical assistance in banking, fiscal affairs and exchange matters, and one way they help is through country surveillance and Article IV consultations. During these consultations a team of IMF economics visit countries with IMF membership and assess economic and financial developments.

In September 30 through October 11, 2019, Mr. Jarkko Turunen lead an IMF team to Cambodia's capital of Phnom Penh and released a comprehensive report of staff findings to be reviewed and presented to the IMF's Executive Board for discussion and decision.

=== The most important aspects of the consultation states ===
- "Cambodia's economic activity has been strong, and growth is expected to remain around 7 percent this year."
- "Further measures are needed to contain high credit growth and address elevated financial sector vulnerabilities, including through targeted measures in the real estate sector."
- "Uncertainties, including from trade tensions and potential suspension of preferential market access, highlight the importance of maintaining macroeconomic stability, while meeting still large development needs, and accelerating implementation of structural reforms to strengthen competitiveness and governance."
