= Chea Serey =

Governor of the National Bank of Cambodia

Her Excellency Dr. Chea Serey
- ជា សិរី
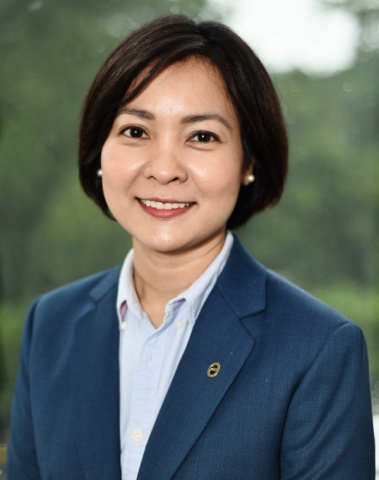

Governor of the National Bank of Cambodia
- Incumbent
- Assumed office 29 July 2023
- Prime Minister: Hun Sen; Hun Manet
- Preceded by: Chea Chanto

Deputy Governor of the National Bank of Cambodia
- In office 10 March 2023 – 29 July 2023
- Governor: Chea Chanto

Personal details
- Born: 25 April 1981 (age 45) Phnom Penh, People's Republic of Kampuchea
- Party: Cambodian People's Party
- Education: Victoria University of Wellington; University of Adelaide (PhD)

Chea Serey (Khmer: ជា សិរី [ciə serəj]; born 25 April 1981) is a Cambodian economist who currently serves as the governor (អគ្គទេសាភិបាល) of the National Bank of Cambodia, the first woman to hold this position.

She previously concurrently served as the chairwoman of the Credit Bureau Cambodia Ltd., which is the first and only privately run credit sharing system in Cambodia, as well as the president of the Cambodian Economic Association, a networking association that brings together economics and professionals in the country for roundtable policy discussions and promotes evidence-based policy making.

== Biography ==
=== Personal life ===
She has 4 children out of whom 2 are adopted.As published on her instagram, she has been in a relationship with her co-worker, Blaise Killian, Co-Director at Sosoro Museum of Money (established by the National Bank of Cambodia).

=== Education ===
Chea Serey was born in Phnom Penh in 1981, from educated parents who had survived the systematic elimination of all intellectuals by the Khmer Rouge communists. Chea Serey attended Baktouk Primary School until the sixth grade and then moved to France at the age of eight, where she studied secondary school. Her family moved to Singapore where she studied her last year of high school at the French International School. In 1999, Chea Serey graduated from Victoria University in Wellington, New Zealand, with a degree in commerce, majoring in accounting and finance. In 2021, she graduated with a Doctor of Philosophy (Ph.D.) in Economics from University of Adelaide, Australia. Her Ph.D. dissertation examines the impacts of financial development and financial inclusion on ASEAN LDCs, with a specific focus on Cambodia. It is to understand the role of financial inclusion in poverty reduction and economic growth, explore the process of ASEAN financial integration, and identify the determinants and trends of financial inclusion in ASEAN countries.

== Career ==
In 2000, the National Bank of Cambodia ordered the liquidation of 17 banks that were unable to meet the minimum requirement of $13 million in paid-up capital. In 2002, she joined the National Bank of Cambodia's banking supervision department and has risen through the ranks since then.

As Director General, in 2018, Chea Serey led a crackdown on fraudulent microcredit institutions, which had multiplied since 1993 in Cambodia's war–torn economy to help its slow recovery, becoming a huge presence in the redevelopment of the Cambodian economy, providing credit to urban and rural communities to help micro-enterprises. In the first half of 2018 alone, however, the National Bank of Cambodia terminated the licenses of 50 rural credit operators in the Kingdom for failing to comply with the rules and regulations of the central bank.

In 2019, Chea Serey was faced with a report of the LICADHO accusing the central bank of allowing predatory lending in the micro-finance sector which she responded by criticizing a "concerted attack" motivated by an ideological bias in favour of a “socialist economy”, organized to destabilize the lending sector in Cambodia.

Chea Serey's competence in reforming the banking sector in Cambodia was rewarded internationally in 2020 when she was named by the Bank for International Settlements on the panel of judges of the G20 TechSprint initiative.

After the banking sector in Cambodia was hit hard by the Coronavirus pandemic, Chea Serey expressed optimism for its prompt recovery through public-private partnership.

== Contribution ==
=== Digital Leapfrogging in Cambodia ===
Chea Serey took an active part in the digitalization of the Khmer economy. In 2017, in order to replace an outdated infrastructure which made the cost of making transactions too high – due to financial institutions with heavy paperwork, over-staffing and waste of time, Chea Serey launched the National Bank of Cambodia Platform, a trading system that allows all financial institutions to make transactions online. Under her leadership, retail payment infrastructure has been modernized: she also led the effort to introduce new electronic payment system based in QR codes. This dynamic had ripple effects on many sectors of the economy. As of 2018, Chea Serey noted that “twenty years ago, telecommunication cost in Cambodia was the highest in ASEAN according to an ADB study, but now I can confidently say that access to Internet is the cheapest in the ASEAN."

Under her leadership, the country's retail payment infrastructure has undergone modernization with the introduction of the Cambodian Shared Switch (CSS) for card transactions, and the FAST payment system, which enables real-time fund transfers between bank accounts in Cambodia. As the chairwoman of the Clearing House Operation Committee, she has spearheaded the Bakong Project, an initiative of the National Bank of Cambodia that explores and introduces a new generation of payment systems using Blockchain technology.

=== Banking Boom in Cambodia ===
As director of the Central Bank of Cambodia, Chea Serey has overlooked the restoration of Cambodia's banking system, the depletion of which has been symbolized by the blowing up of the headquarters of the central bank in Phnom Penh under the Khmer Rouge. When Chea Serey started work at the National Bank of Cambodia, there were 16 banks and by 2013 there were 38, 7 of which were specialised banks and 32 commercial banks.

Cambodia reopened its central bank as the People’s National Bank of Kampuchea on October 10, 1979. Back then, it was a point in history that had already witnessed the depletion of the country’s entire financial system.

— Chea Serey, Director General of the Central Bank of Cambodia

Chea Serey was an early supporter of the potential of blockchain technology but has been cautious about the development of cryptocurrencies in Cambodia. Though the National Bank of Cambodia is launching its own blockchain technology, which allows secure digital currency transactions, the body is not willing to trust all cryptocurrencies. Director General Chea Serey called the fintech “a new form of fraud” in a conference in November, and later banned initial coin offerings from Cambodia-based currencies.

=== From de-dollarization to Bakong blockchain currency ===
The dollarization of the Cambodian economy is an issue which Chea Serey explains was a consequence of Cambodia coming out of post-conflict poverty and the UNTAC period. Already in December 2016, the National Bank of Cambodia released a directive instructing commercial banks and microfinance institutions in Cambodia to issue a greater percentage of their loans in the local currency, a regulation that aims to promote the use of the riel, Cambodia's national currency. Later, in July 2017, Chea Serey was responsible for drafting Cambodia's first draft national strategy on promoting the riel. In order to boost the riel, and avoid the dependency on the dollar, Chea Serey also promoted the use of the Chinese yuan in trade with China, as similar arrangements are being pursued with Asean nations, particularly Thailand and Vietnam, while continuing to encourage the preferential use of the Khmer riel.

[Fintech], it’s terrifying but it’s also exciting. I think we will embrace it but at the same time we have to be very cautious.

— Chea Serey, The Banker

She also believes that blockchain technology can help to boost trust in government banking. In her own words, Bakong is not a central bank digital currency, because many of its elements do not fit that definition, but a backbone payment system. As of March 2022, 270,000 Cambodians use this Bakong digital currency on a daily basis and these services have reached around 7.9 million people, which is almost half of the country's population of 16.7 million inhabitants. By the end of 2021, 6.8 million transactions, worth around $2.9 billion, had been recorded by the National Bank of Cambodia.

== Awards ==
=== Royal Medals ===
Chea Serey was granted the Grand Order of National Merit (មេដាយជាតូបការ) by King Norodom Sihamoni in 2018.

=== Recognitions ===
In 2017, the Asia Society recognized Chea Serey, then Director General of Central Banking at the National Bank of Cambodia, as a member of its 21 Young Leaders, Class of 2017, for her “outstanding achievement, commitment to public service, and [her] proven ability to make the world a better place”.

In 2018, the Singapore Summit additionally recognized her as a member of its carefully selected Young Societal Leaders.

In 2019, the World Economic Forum honored Chea Serey as a member of its Young Global Leaders, Class of 2019, a forum of carefully selected global “next-generation decision-makers determined to drive positive change”.

In 2020, she was “honored as the recipient of the Future of Payment Award from the Budapest Institute of Banking and Center for Finance, Technology and Entrepreneurship (CFTE) as a game-changer in the payment sector in recognition of her efforts towards the digitalisation of banking and financial institutions in Cambodia”.

In 2021, she received the Nikkei award for the financial inclusion of the Bakong digital currency which she had launched in 2020.

=== Other achievements ===
Serey is a staunch advocate for women's economic empowerment and financial inclusion. She serves as a member of the Alliance for Financial Inclusion's high-level Gender and Women's Financial Inclusion Committee, the Southeast Asia Advisory Council of Women's World Banking, and the Young Global Leaders, Class of 2019, which is a forum of young global leaders created by the World Economic Forum.

In 2018, she was acknowledged by the Asia Philanthropy Circle as one of the 25 Most Impactful Philanthropists in ASEAN. Serey has also been recognized in 2021 as a "Hero of Philanthropy" by the LA Weekly through the Raska Koma Foundation, which she cofounded to “empower underprivileged Cambodia children with the same opportunity as all people for a better future of themselves and their community” by promoting better healthcare, welfare, and interests for them.

== Bibliography ==
- Heng, Dyna; Chea, Serey; Heng, Bomakara (29 April 2021). Impacts of Interest Rate Cap on Financial Inclusion in Cambodia. International Monetary Fund. ISBN 978-1-5135-8263-4.
