= European Chamber of Commerce in Cambodia =

The European Chamber of Commerce in Cambodia (EuroCham Cambodia) is a non-profit, non-political organization, established to support European businesses operating in or related to Cambodia. It was established on June 2, 2011, representing over 400 businesses, promoting trade, investment, and advocacy with the Royal Government of Cambodia to foster a transparent and sustainable business environment.

EuroCham Cambodia is headquartered in Phnom Penh. The current chairperson is Gabriele Faja, elected in March 2025.

== Advocacy work ==
In 2018 and 2019, EuroCham Cambodia took a public stance against the European Union's proposed withdrawal of the Anything But Arms trade preferences for the Kingdom of Cambodia. This action was initiated by the European Parliament in response to the 2018 Cambodian general election.
