= Cambodia Development Cooperation Forum =

The first Cambodia Development Cooperation Forum (CDCF), a restructured format for the Consultative Group (CG) meeting, was held in Phnom Penh on June 19–20, 2007. The CDCF was chaired by the Royal Government of Cambodia (RGC) with the World Bank as the Lead Donor Facilitator. The theme for 2007 was "Progress in Implementing the National Strategic Development Plan 2006-2010".

== Aid coordination ==
Official Development Assistance (ODA) is the major source of financing of development programs of the RGC and has contributed to the implementation of major public development projects in Cambodia. In 2004, approximately US$555.4 million of ODA was disbursed, equivalent to 11% of gross domestic product (with an estimated nominal GDP of US$4.9 billion for 2004). Improving effectiveness of ODA is a high priority of the RGC. The RGC created the Cambodian Rehabilitation and Development Board at the Council for the Development of Cambodia (CDC/CRDB) in 1994 as the in-country aid coordination focal point.

As Cambodia is a highly aid-dependent country, the Government-Development Partner relationship in Cambodia is crucial. Government and Development Partners are becoming increasingly aware of the benefits of aid coordination and are taking steps to improve harmonization among Development Partners, and between Development Partners and Government, in order to build capacity in Government and deliver pro-poor reform. The RGC, with Development Partner support, has taken action on the aid effectiveness mantle on several fronts. The Consultative Group mechanism is an important venue for high-level Government-Development Partner discussions on aid effectiveness and socio-economic development.

Since the adoption of the Consultative Group mechanism in 1996, eight Consultative Group meetings have been held. The first five meetings, held in Tokyo and Paris, were chaired by the World Bank while the last three, held in Phnom Penh, were co-chaired by the Royal Government of Cambodia and World Bank.

Reflecting further local ownership, in 2006, the RGC decided to transform the Consultative Group meeting into the Cambodia Development Cooperation Forum, which would be chaired by the RGC, starting from 2007. The Forum would provide Government, Development Partners and civil society with an opportunity for dialogue on public policy processes and the associated Government financing, and focus on key strategic policy issues or on broad areas where faster and critical progress is necessary or where additional actions are needed.

== National Strategies ==
The international community has committed to the principles of the Rome Declaration on Harmonization (2003) and the Paris Declaration on Aid Effectiveness (2005), which aim to reform aid to avoid such practices and promote local ownership, harmonization, alignment, results and mutual accountability in order to improve overall aid effectiveness and facilitate the obtainment of the Millennium Development Goals. In line with these declarations, the RGC has developed its overall vision for a New Development Cooperation Partnership Paradigm for Cambodia to improve ODA effectiveness (2000), the Cambodia Declaration on development cooperation partnerships to enhance aid effectiveness (2004), the Strategic Framework for Development Cooperation Management (2005), and the latest overarching policy document – National Strategic Development Plan (2006–2010).

The National Strategic Development Plan puts forth a comprehensive reform and development agenda and sets out an ambitious plan for accelerating and diversifying growth, reaching poor people and providing vital basic services. It recognizes that improving governance, reducing corruption, strengthening the rule of law and increasing the accountability of the Government to its people are the central challenges for the Government to reduce poverty and achieve socio-economic development.

== Related external links ==
- Cambodian Rehabilitation and Development Board (CRDB) at the Council for the Development of Cambodia (CDC)
- The National Strategic Development Plan: 2006-2010 (PDF)
- Cambodia: National Strategic Development Plan (NSDP) 2006-2010 - Formulation, Monitoring and Evaluation Process (PDF) – by World Bank
- Paris Declaration on Aid Effectiveness (2005)
- Rome Declaration on Harmonization (2003)
- CMDGs - Cambodia Millennium Development Goals
