= National Bank of Cambodia =

Central bank of Cambodia

National Bank of Cambodia ធនាគារជាតិនៃកម្ពុជា

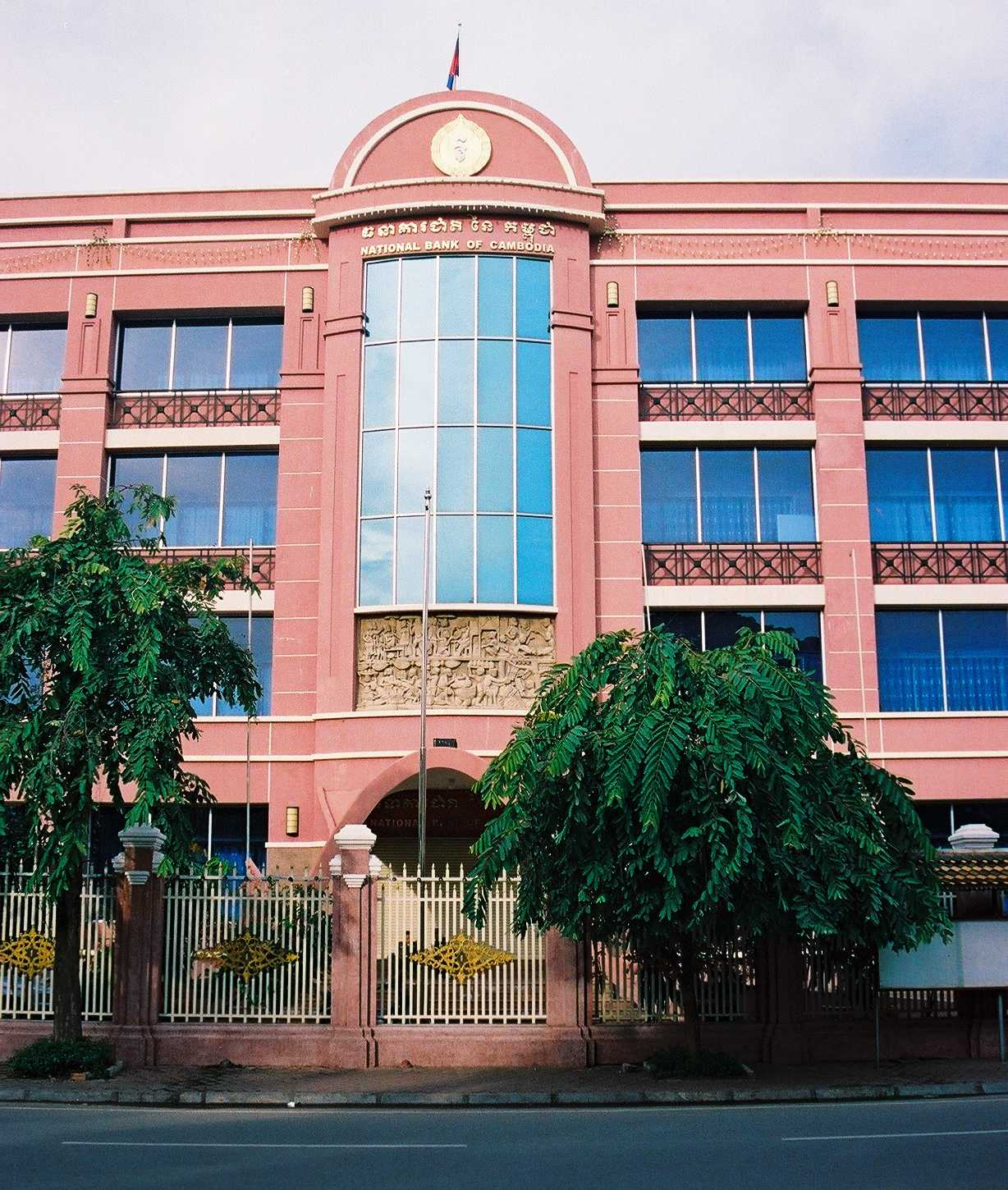
- Headquarters in Phnom Penh
- Central bank of: Cambodia
- Headquarters: Daun Penh, Phnom Penh, Cambodia
- Established: 23 December 1954; 71 years ago
- Ownership: 100% state ownership
- Governor: Dr. Chea Serey
- Currency: Cambodian riel KHR (ISO 4217)
- Reserves: 6 760 million USD
- Website: www.nbc.org.kh

The National Bank of Cambodia (NBC; Khmer: ធនាគារជាតិនៃកម្ពុជា [tʰĕə.niə.kiə ciət nəj kam.pu.ciə]) is the central bank of Cambodia. The bank's duties include, inter alia, the management of monetary and exchange policies, the regulation of banks and financial institutions, and the control of the national currency, the riel. The bank was established in 1954, after Cambodia obtained its independence from France, taking over from the Institut d'Émission des États du Cambodge, du Laos et du Viet-nam, a short-lived French quasi-central bank that had itself replaced the Banque de l'Indochine two years earlier.

During Democratic Kampuchea from 1975 to 1979, the whole financial system ceased to exist in the era of the non-monetary economy, but the central bank was re-established in October 1979. It was known as the Red Bank or Banque Rouge, or officially the People's National Bank of Kampuchea from 1979 to 1992 during the People's Republic of Kampuchea.

== History ==
=== Creation of a national bank for Cambodia after independence ===
The National Bank of Cambodia was established on 23 December 1954, after the country gained its independence from the French Protectorate and after the Institut d’Emission, the printing house for the three Indochinese countries, was terminated. At its inception, the bank emitted the national riel currency with a gold standard of a weight of 25.3905 milligrams of fine gold secured by the assets in gold and foreign currencies by the National Bank of Cambodia itself. It thus served an important role as a mixed-economy entreprise of the Sangkum.

The Cambodian Civil War fragilized the Cambodian banking system and on 28 October 1971, the National Bank ordered the commercial banks to suspend all foreign exchange operations in a vain attempt to establish a "flexible" rate for the riel, whose value collapsed as the United States dollar became the de facto currency.

=== Destruction by the Khmer Rouge ===
The National Bank of Cambodia was one of the two buildings along with the Cathedral of Phnom Penh which was systematically destroyed by the Khmer Rouge indicated their two main enemies: capitalism and religion. Only ruins remained of the National Bank of Cambodia following the explosion set off by the Khmer Rouge during the fall of Phnom Penh on 17 April 1975.

=== Creating a bank in a communist regime under Vietnamese occupation ===
In an ironic turn of events, the communist regime set up after the Vietnamese invasion in 1979, the People's Republic of Kampuchea, was to reintroduce the use of currency as well as reestablish the capitalist banking system. Since the Khmer Rouge had demolished the main office of the National Bank of Cambodia, the temporary head office of the bank was opened on the upper floor of the Khmer Bank of Commerce with credits from the Soviet Union. Through the 1980s, the Central Bank of Cambodia performed both central and commercial bank functions.

=== Restoration of the monarchy and the national bank ===
In 1990, the gravels that were left from the old building were removed to build a new central bank for Cambodia. Gradually the banking system was strengthened and modernized as democracy and monarchy returned to Cambodia after the 1993 general election. The building was renovated once more in 2003 and is now building new headquarters at the same location.

Cambodia has an integrated sectoral financial sector authority model where the National Bank of Cambodia (NBC) is only responsible for consumer protection and market conduct (CPMC) in the banking industry.

== Board of directors ==
The governing body of the Central Bank is the board of directors. The board consists of seven members: the governor, the deputy governor, and five other members, one representing the head of government, one representing the Ministry of Economy and Finance, one representing economic activities, one representing higher education, and one representing the staff of the Central Bank. The board is headed by the governor.

List of governors
No.	Name	Term
1	Son Sann	1955 – 1969
2	Touch Kim	1969 – 1970
3	Hing Kunthel	1970 – 1972
4	Sok Chhong	1972 – 1974
5	Kem Nguon Trach	1974 – 1975
disestablished (1975 – 1979)
6	Chan Phin	1979 – 1981
7	Cha Rieng	1981 – 1993
8	Thor Peng Leath	1993 – 1998
9	Chea Chanto	1998 – 2023
10	Chea Serey	2023 – present

== Branches ==
The National Bank of Cambodia has its main headquarters in Phnom Penh as well as 21 branches in various provinces of the country.

== Digital Payment Infrastructure ==
In 2016, the National Bank of Cambodia launched Bakong, a retail payment system built on blockchain technology — one of the first central bank-issued digital payment systems in Southeast Asia. In 2024, Bakong processed 608 million transactions totalling approximately $150.61 billion, equivalent to 330% of Cambodia's gross domestic product.

The NBC also administers KHQR, Cambodia's national QR payment standard based on the international EMVCo specification, enabling interoperability across all licensed banks and payment service providers operating in Cambodia.

== See also ==
- Cambodian riel
- List of banks in Cambodia
- Economy of Cambodia
- Ministry of Economy and Finance (Cambodia)
- Chea Serey
- List of central banks
- List of financial supervisory authorities by country

== Bibliography ==
- Slocomb, Margaret (2010-01-01). An Economic History of Cambodia in the Twentieth Century. NUS Press. ISBN 978-9971-69-499-9.
- Gardere, Jean-Daniel (2010). Money and Sovereignty: An Exploration of the Economic, Political and Monetary History of Cambodia. National Bank of Cambodia. ISBN 978-99963-511-2-9.
- Clark, Heather A. (2006-03-14). When There Was No Money: Building ACLEDA Bank in Cambodia's Evolving Financial Sector. Springer Science & Business Media. ISBN 978-3-540-28877-0.
