= Foreign ownership of companies of Canada =

Foreign ownership of companies of Canada pertains to the majority-ownership of Canadian-based assets (including businesses and subsidiaries) by non-Canadian individuals or companies, as well as to companies that are effectively owned or controlled, directly or indirectly, by non-Canadians. "Non-Canadian," for all intents and purposes, refers to entities based outside Canada and to those who are not Canadian citizens or qualified permanent residents.

Foreign ownership (or 'foreign affiliates') of Canadian companies has long been a controversial political issue in Canada. Concerns regarding the issue generally regard ownership of previously 'Canadian' assets by foreign entities, though the exact definition of 'foreign-owned' is subject of debate.

Foreign majority-owned affiliates contribute significantly to the economy of Canada. In 2016, foreign affiliates accounted for 14% of Canada's gross domestic product and employed 12% of workers.

== Overview ==
Historically, foreign ownership was a political issue in Canada in the late 1960s and early 1970s, when it was believed by some that U.S. investment had reached new heights (though its levels had actually remained stable for decades), and then in the 1980s, during debates over the Free Trade Agreement.

However, the situation has changed; since in the interim period, Canada itself became a major investor and owner of foreign corporations. Since the 1980s, Canada's levels of investment and ownership in foreign companies have been larger than foreign investment and ownership in Canada. In some smaller countries, such as Montenegro, Canadian investment is sizable enough to make up a major portion of the economy. In Northern Ireland, for example, Canada is the largest foreign investor. By becoming foreign owners themselves, Canadians have become far less politically concerned about investment within Canada.

Something to note is that Canada's largest companies by value, and largest employers, tend to be foreign-owned in a way that is more typical of a developing nation than a G8 member. The best example is the automotive sector, one of Canada's most important industries. It is dominated by American, German, and Japanese automotive giants. Although this situation is not unique to Canada in the global context, it is unique among G8 nations, and many other relatively small nations also have national automotive companies.

In 2004, foreign-controlled corporations accounted for 21.9% of assets held in Canada, and 30.0% of operating revenues yet comprised less than 1% (approx. 8,000) of the total 1.3 million corporations in Canada. Assets of foreign-controlled corporations rose 8.3% to $1.1 trillion in 2004, while those of Canadian-controlled corporations rose 8.9% to $3.9 trillion. All in all, foreign-controlled profits soared to a record $68 billion that year, up 21.7% from 2003. Also that year, foreign-controlled corporations operating revenues in Canada averaged $96 million, compared with less than $2 million for their Canadian-controlled counterparts.

In 2006, 34 Canadian companies were purchased by foreign interests worth $62 billion, nearly 4% of Canada's market value.

=== Statistics ===
In 2016, foreign affiliates accounted for 14% of Canada's gross domestic product and employed 12% of workers. That year, foreign affiliates in the manufacturing sector accounted for 41% of the value added of foreign multinationals operating in Canada, an increase from 38% in 2010.

Value added by foreign majority-owned organizations, by sector
Sector	Value added (CA$billion)		
Sector	2010	2014	2016
Mining, quarrying, and oil and gas extraction	36.9	38.4	21.1
Manufacturing - total	85.5	105.3	108.6
Transportation equipment manufacturing	12.8	18.5	21.6
Chemical manufacturing	9.2	13.3	15.4
Petroleum and coal product manufacturing	10.2	14.7	7.7
Other manufacturing	53.3	58.8	63.8
Services - total	94.3	117.8	125.1
Wholesale trade	25.1	34.4	36.8
Professional, scientific, and technical services	12.5	19.9	18.9
Retail trade	14.2	16.0	18.4
Finance and insurance	14.2	14.4	14.9
Others	28.3	33.3	36.1
All sectors - total	224.8	275.5	267.1

== Existing foreign-owned companies in Canada ==
Company	Foreign owner(s)	Origin of foreign owner	Notes
500px	Visual China Group	China	
Aeryon Labs	Teledyne FLIR (Teledyne Technologies)	United States	
Allstream Inc.	Zayo Group)	United States	A communications company with complicated corporate history now owned by Zayo Group since 2015.
AltaLink	Berkshire Hathaway Energy	United States	one of Canada's largest electricity transmission companies.
AltaSteel	Kyoei Steel	Japan	Kyoei Steel acquired AltaSteel in 2020.
Arc'teryx	Amer Sports (Anta Sports)	Finland (China)	Purchased by Amer Sports in 2005. Since 2018, Amer has been a subsidiary of Chinese retail conglomerate Anta Sports.
Asia Pacific Marine Container Lines (Asia Pacific Group Canada)	Leung Maritime Group	China (Hong Kong)	one of Canada's largest cargo transport companies
Aviva Canada	Aviva	United Kingdom	
Black Press	Carpenter Media Group	United States	Carpenter acquired Black Press in 2024.
Boeing Canada	Boeing	United States	
BP Canada	BP	United Kingdom	
Canada Bread	Grupo Bimbo	Mexico	Purchased by Bimbo in 2014 for CAD$1.83 billion and operates as an independent business unit of the global baking company. Vachon Bakery is a Canada Bread subsidiary.
Canada Goose	Bain Capital	United States	Bain Capital became Canada Goose Holdings Inc's majority shareholder in 2013.
Cargill Canada	Cargill	United States (Minnesota)	
CNOOC Petroleum North America	China National Offshore Oil Corporation	China	Nexen Inc. was one of two Canadian oil and gas companies that the Harper government controversially approved the sale of to foreign state-owned enterprises in 2012; though it stated that future takeovers by SOEs would face new rules, especially in the energy sector. Nexen became a wholly owned subsidiary of CNOOC on 25 February 2013.
Coast Hotels	APA Group	Japan	The chain has been a subsidiary of the Japan-based APA Group since 2016.
Colt Canada	Colt CZ Group	Czech Republic	Founded as Diemaco in 1975, it was acquired by Colt in 2005.
Corel	Vector Capital	United States	A software and programming company first taken over by Vector Capital in August 2003, and acquired by KKR in 2019. It was reacquired by Vector in 2026.
Costco Wholesale Canada	Costco	United States (Washington)	
Davie Shipbuilding	Inocea Group	United Kingdom	Davie has gone through many ownership changes over the years and has been owned by Inocea since 2012.
Delta Hotels	Marriott International	United States	Delta was acquired by Marriott in 2015.
Designer Brands Canada	Designer Brands	United States	Designer Brands fully acquired Town Shoes in 2018 and continues to operate its banners, The Shoe Company and DSW Designer Shoe Warehouse.
Direct Energy	NRG Energy	United States	
Dofasco	ArcelorMittal	Luxembourg	Canada's largest steel maker; acquired by Arcelor in January 2006.
Dollar Tree Canada	Dollar Tree	United States	Dollar Tree acquired local chain Dollar Giant in 2010 and converted all stores to Dollar Tree.
First Choice Haircutters	Regis Corporation	United States	First Choice Haircutters was purchased by Regis Corporation in October 2000.
FRHI Hotels & Resorts	Accor	France	Fairmont Raffles Hotels International (FRHI) was formed in 2006 when Fairmont Hotels and Resorts was acquired by Colony Capital, who subsequently entered into a joint partnership with the Kingdom Holding Company; consolidating Fairmont with their other hotel brands, Raffles and Swissôtel to form FRHI. FRHI in turn became a subsidiary of Accor in 2016.
Ford Motor Company of Canada	Ford Motor Company	United States	
Four Seasons Hotels & Resorts	Cascade Investment	United States	Cascade owns 71.25% of the Four Seasons as of 2022.
G3 Canada	Bunge Global and Saudi Agricultural and Livestock Investment Company (SALIC)	United States and Saudi Arabia	G3 originated as the Canadian Wheat Board and is now a joint venture between Bunge and SALIC with a combined 50.1% shares.
General Dynamics Land Systems - Canada	General Dynamics Land Systems (General Dynamics)	United States	
General Dynamics Mission Systems - Canada	General Dynamics Mission Systems (General Dynamics)	United States	
General Electric Canada (formerly Canadian General Electric)	General Electric	United States	a wholly owned unit of General Electric
General Motors Canada	General Motors	United States (Michigan)	Canada's largest automotive manufacturer. This also includes CAMI Automotive, an assembly plant wholly owned by GM Canada.
Honda Canada Inc.	Honda	Japan	including Honda of Canada Manufacturing
Horizon Maritime	Chouest Group	United States	Horizon Maritime was acquired by the American Chouest group in October 2026.
IBM Canada	IBM	United States	
Impala Canada	Impala Platinum	South Africa	North American Palladium was purchased by Impala Platinum in 2019 and rechristened Impala Canada.
Imperial Oil	ExxonMobil	United States	ExxonMobil owns around 69.6% of Imperial Oil.
Imperial Tobacco Canada	British American Tobacco	United Kingdom	
Kia Canada Inc.	Kia	South Korea	
Kobo Inc.	Rakuten	Japan	
La Senza	Regent LP	United States	In January 2019, L Brands sold the La Senza business to Regent, a Beverly Hills-based private equity firm controlled by investor Michael Reinstein.
Labatt Brewing Company	Anheuser-Busch InBev	Belgium	Labatt was purchased by Belgian brewer Interbrew in 1995, and was eventually absorbed into AB InBev.
Lockheed Martin Canada	Lockheed Martin	United States	
Lactalis Canada	Lactalis	Italy	Black Diamond Cheese was purchased by Parmalat in 1988. Lactalis acquired full ownership of Parmalat in 2019 and rebranded Parmalat Canada to Lactalis Canada in 2020.
Lorex	Skywatch	Taiwan	Lorex, a distributor of security systems founded in 1991, was acquired by Skywatch in 2022.
Mars Canada	Mars, Inc.	United States	
Masonite	Owens Corning	United States	On May 14, 2024, Masonite International was acquired by Owens-Corning.
McDonald's Canada	McDonald's	United States	
McKesson Canada	McKesson Corporation	United States	McKesson acquired Canadian pharmacy chains Proxim and Uniprix in 2008 and 2017 respectively.
Mega Brands	Mattel	United States	
Mercedes-Benz Canada	Mercedes-Benz	Germany	
Mitel	Searchlight Capital	United States	Mitel was bought by Searchlight Capital in 2018.
Mitsui and Company	Mitsui	Japan	
Mondelez Canada	Mondelez International	United States	Mondelez Canada originated as Christie Brown & Company which was bought by Nabisco in 1928, retaining use of the Christie brand in Canada for both Christie and Nabisco products. Mondelez acquired Nabisco in 2012.
Moores	Tailored Brands	United States	
Nissan Canada	Nissan Motors	Japan	
Nordion	Sotera Health	United States	A medical sterilization company owned by Sotera since 2014.
Northrop Grumman Canada	Northrop Grumman	United States	
OLCO Petroleum Group	Morgan Stanley	United States	Morgan Stanley purchased 60% of OLCO in 2007.
Orano Canada	Orano	France	
PetroKazakhstan	PetroChina (China National Petroleum Corp)	China	PetroKazakhstan is a Calgary-based company exploring in Central Asia. It was purchased by the China National Petroleum Corporation in 2005, and transferred to its subsidiary PetroChina.
Petronas Canada	Petronas	Malaysia	Progress Energy Resources was one of two Canadian oil and gas companies that the Harper government controversially approved the sale of to foreign state-owned enterprises in 2012; though it stated that future takeovers by SOEs would face new rules, especially in the energy sector.
Postmedia Network	Chatham Asset Management	United States	Chatham has majority owned Postmedia since 2019.
Pratt & Whitney Canada	Pratt & Whitney	United States	
Raytheon Canada	Raytheon	United States	
Resolute Forest Products	Domtar	United States	In 2023, the company was acquired by Domtar.
Rio Algom	BHP	Australia	
Rio Tinto Alcan	Rio Tinto	Australia / United Kingdom	Canadian manufacturer Alcan was purchased by Rio Tinto in 2007 and merged with Rio Tinto's Canadian division, becoming Rio Tinto Alcan.
Rona	Sycamore Partners	United States	Rona was purchased by American hardware store chain Lowe's in 2016 and sold to Sycamore Partners in 2023.
Roots Canada	Marquee Brands	United States	American company Searchlight Capital acquired an undisclosed majority stake in 2015. In 2026 a partnership was formed with Marquee Brands purchasing the brand, trademarks, and intellectual property of Roots with Canadian firm JM&A Design and Development acquiring the retail operations.
Seaspan ULC	The Washington Companies	United States	The Washington Companies acquired Seaspan in 1996.
Shell Canada	Shell	United Kingdom	
Sleeman Breweries	Sapporo Breweries	Japan	
Sony Canada	Sony Corp	Japan	
SRY Rail Link	The Washington Companies	United States	
Sport Maska Inc.	Altor Equity Partners	Sweden	Sport Maska is a hockey equipment company that was purchased by Altor in 2024. It is known for its brands CCM Hockey and Canadien.
Staples Canada	Sycamore Partners	United States	
Stelco	Cleveland-Cliffs	United States	Stelco was Canada's last major independent steel producer. It was taken over by United States Steel in 2007, before being acquired by Bedrock in 2016 and Cleveland-Cliffs in 2024.
Tata Communications Canada	Tata Communications	India	Founded as a crown corporation in 1950 as Canadian Overseas Telecommunications Corporation later reanmed Teleglobe Canada. It was privatized in 1987 and eventually bought by Tata Group in 2005.
Telesat	Loral Space & Communications	United States	Founded as a crown corporation in 1969 and privatized in 1998. First purchased by Bell Canada, Loral acquired a majority share in 2005.
TJX Canada	TJX Companies	United States	Operates Canadian stores Winners and HomeSense, as well as American brands Marshalls and TJ Maxx. Winners merged with TJX in 1990. HomeSense was founded by TJX for the Canadian market in 2001.
Toyota Canada Inc.	Toyota	Japan	including Toyota Motor Manufacturing Canada
Univar Canada	Univar Solutions	United States	
Universal Music Canada	Universal Music Group	United States and Netherlands	
Valbruna ASW	Ampco Pittsburgh	United States	ASW was purchased by Ampco-Pittsburgh Corporation in 2016.
Voortman Cookies	Second Nature Brands	United States	A majority stake in Voortman was purchased by American firm Swander Pace Capital in 2015. Hostess Brands purchased Voortman from Swander Pace in 2019. Hostess was then itself acquired by Smuckers. Voortman was purchased from Smuckers by Second Nature in 2024.
Wal-Mart Canada	Walmart Inc.	United States	wholly owned by Walmart
Warner Music Canada	Warner Music Group	United States	
Waste Connections of Canada	Waste Connections	United States	Majority shares are owned by Waste Connections
Wattpad	Naver Corporation	South Korea	
Wow Unlimited Media	Kartoon Studios	United States	Wow was acquired in 2022. It notably owns Mainframe Studios.

=== Banks ===
- AMEX Bank of Canada — American Express (US)
- Citibank Canada — Citigroup (US)
- Habib Canadian Bank — Habib Bank AG Zurich (Switzerland)
- ICICI Bank Canada — ICICI Bank (India)
- Shinhan Bank Canada — Shinhan Bank Korea (South Korea)
- KEB Hana Bank Canada — Hana Financial Group (South Korea)
- Sumitomo Mitsui Banking Corporation of Canada — Sumitomo Mitsui Banking Corp. (Japan)

=== Gaming companies ===
Company	Foreign owner(s)	Origin of foreign owner
HB Studios	2K	United States
Beenox	Activision	United States
Radical Entertainment	Activision	United States
Beamdog	Aspyr (Embracer Group)	United States (Sweden)
Big Blue Bubble	Enad Global 7	Sweden
Piranha Games	Enad Global 7	Sweden
BioWare	Electronic Arts	United States
EA Montreal	Electronic Arts	United States
EA Vancouver	Electronic Arts	United States
Motive Studios	Electronic Arts	United States
Eidos-Montréal	Embracer Group	Sweden
Smoking Gun Interactive	Keywords Studios (EQT AB)	Ireland (Sweden)
Digital Extremes	Leyou	China
Bad Brain Game Studios	NetEase	China
NetEase Games Montreal	NetEase	China
SkyBox Labs	NetEase	China
Next Level Games	Nintendo	Japan
Rockstar Toronto	Rockstar Games	United States
Klei Entertainment	Tencent	China
Ubisoft Montreal	Ubisoft	France
Ubisoft Quebec	Ubisoft	France
Ubisoft Saguenay	Ubisoft	France
Ubisoft Toronto	Ubisoft	France
WB Games Montréal	Warner Bros. Interactive Entertainment	United States
The Coalition	Xbox Game Studios	United States

=== Formerly foreign-owned ===
Canadian companies that were once foreign-owned but are currently owned by a Canadian company:

- Cirque du Soleil — Before being acquired in 2020 by Canada's Capital Catalyst Group, Cirque's three shareholders were U.S.-based TPG Capital, Chinese-based Fosun, and Canadian-based Caisse de depot et placement du Quebec.
- FortisBC (formerly BC Gas, a public utility company) — Then known as Terasen Inc., it was sold to American-owned energy giant Kinder Morgan for $6.9 billion. The deal was approved in 2005 by the B.C. Utilities Commission despite 8,000 letters of protest. Terasen was subsequently sold to Newfoundland-based Fortis Inc. in 2007.
- Ludia — A video game developer acquired by British company Fremantle in 2010 and sold to American company Jam City in 2021. In 2025 Ludia was purchased by Canadian investors.
- Spence Diamonds — Was purchased by UK company Lion Capital LLP in 2015 and acquired by Canadian private equity company TriWest Capital Partners in 2025.
- Tangerine Bank (formerly ING Bank of Canada) — formed by the purchase of several small Canadian companies by the Dutch ING Group. It has been owned since 2012 by Scotiabank (formally the Bank of Nova Scotia).
- Tim Hortons — sold to U.S.-based Wendy's International in 1995, and later to sold to the public as an IPO in 2005. It is now owned by Toronto-based Restaurant Brands International, a Canadian-American fast food holding company.
- Ultramar — Owned by Calgary-based Parkland Fuel since 2016. It was previously owned by American companies CST Brands, and before that Valero Energy.

== Former Canadian companies acquired by foreign owners ==
Company	Foreign owner	Origin of foreign owner	Notes
Addax Petroleum	Sinopec	China	Addax was one of 9 Canadian Fortune 2000 oil and gas companies in 2009. It was acquired by Sinopec for C$8.27 billion in June 2009 and approved by the Chinese government on August 12 that year.
ATI Technologies	Advanced Micro Devices	United States	ATI was Canada's graphics chip maker, acquired by Advanced Micro Devices in July 2006.
Canadian Pacific Hotels	Colony Capital, LLC and Kingdom Holding Co.	United States and Saudi Arabia	Canadian Pacific Hotels was the owner of many of Canada's most historic hotel properties (operating under the name Fairmont Hotels and Resorts since 1999). It was sold to California-based Colony Capital, LLC and Saudi Arabia-based Kingdom Holding Company for $3.9 billion, in January 2006.
Capcom Interactive Canada	Capcom	Japan	Originally founded as Cosmic Infinity, Inc. and acquired and rebranded by Capcom in 2006. Directly integrated into Capcom in 2016 as Capcom Mobile.
Capcom Vancouver	Capcom	Japan	Founded as Blue Castle Games in 2004 and acquired by Capcom in 2010. Shut down in 2018.
Consumers Distributing	Ackermans & van Haaren	Belgium	Consumers was acquired by AvH in 1993. It filed for bankruptcy in 1996.
CP Ships Ltd.	TUI AG	Germany	Merged with TUI AG, the parent company of Hapag-Lloyd Container Line, after in an all-cash transaction worth $2.3 billion US in 2005.
Creo	Eastman Kodak	United States	Creo was a world leader in digital printing software.
EA Black Box	Electronic Arts	United States	Founded as Black Box Games in 1998 and acquired by EA in 2002. It was renamed Quicklime Games in 2012 but shutdown the next year.
Eaton's	Sears	United States	Eaton's was, at one time, Canada's largest retailer, with a history going back to 1869. It was purchased by Sears in 1999 and closed in 2000. Since 2016 the brand has been owned by Canadian company Cadillac Fairview.
Falconbridge Ltd.	Xstrata	Switzerland	
FUN Technologies	Liberty Media	United States	FUN was acquired and integrated into Liberty Media in 2007.
Future Shop	Best Buy	United States	
Grand & Toy	The ODP Corporation	United States	Grand & Toy was acquired by OfficeMax in 1996. OfficeMax merged with Office Depot in 2013. Grand & Toy continues to exist as a brand name and website.
Gulf Canada	Conoco	United States	Gulf Canada had formerly been part of U.S.-based Gulf Oil, later becoming independent. It was then purchased by Conoco in a deal worth $6.7 billion in 2002. In 2015, Gulf-branded gas stations returned to Canada through a licensing deal between XTR Energy Company Limited and Gulf Oil International U.K. Limited.
Hudson's Bay Company	NRDC Equity Partners	United States	Hudson's Bay Company purchased by NRDC in 2008 and liquidated in 2025.
ID Biomedical	GlaxoSmithKline	United Kingdom	ID Biomedical, a Canadian vaccine maker, was acquired by pharmaceutical giant GlaxoSmithKline for $1.8 billion in 2005.
JDS Fitel	Uniphase	United States	In 1999, JDS Fitel announced a $8.9-billion merger with Uniphase to form JDS Uniphase. Company headquarters moved from Ottawa to San Jose.
LW Stores	Big Lots	United States	LW Stores was acquired by Big Lots in 2011 and shut down in 2014.
MacMillan Bloedel	Weyerhaeuser	United States	B.C. forestry giant acquired by Weyerhaeuser for US$2.45 billion in 1999
Moore Wallace	R.R. Donnelley and Sons	United States	Moore Wallace sold to R.R. Donnelley and Sons for $4.9 billion. In February 2004, R.R. Donnelley merged with Moore Wallace, keeping the name R.R. Donnelley as the name of the combined company.
Noranda	Xstrata	Switzerland	Noranda purchased by mining company Xstrata in 2006. It had earlier been a target of state-owned China Metals Corp., but had backed out in 2005 amid public concern in Canada of Chinese state control of such a major company.
Onoma	Embracer Group	Sweden	Established by Square Enix in 2011 as Square Enix Montreal and sold to Embracer in 2021. It was briefly renamed Onoma but shut down months later in 2022.
Orion Bus Industries	DaimlerChrysler	Germany	Acquired by Western Star Trucks in 1995 which was itslef acquired by DaimlerChrysler soon after through subsidiary Freightliner Trucks. The company was then run through Daimler Buses North America until Orion was closed in 2013.
Pixar Canada	Pixar	United States	
Rockstar Vancouver	Rockstar Games	United States	Founded as Barking Dog Studios in 1998 and acquired by Rockstar in 2002. Shut down in 2012.
Seagram	Vivendi Universal and Pernod Ricard	France	distillery and entertainment conglomerate; sold to Vivendi Universal and Pernod Ricard in 2000
Sears Canada	Sears Holdings Corp.	United States	Sears Canada was one of the largest retailers (created by buying old Simpson's stores).
Tembec	RYAM	United States	Tembec wad purchased merged with RYAM in 2017 for CAD $475 million.
The Stars Group	Flutter Entertainment	Ireland and United States	Stars Group was purchased and absorbed in 2020.
Vincor International Ltd	Constellation Brands	United States	Vincor, Canada's top wine maker and distributor, was purchased for $1.4 billion by Constellation.
XS Cargo	KarpReilly LLC	United States	In 2011, XS Cargo was sold to Greenwich, Connecticut-based private investment firm KarpReilly LLC. The company went bankrupt in 2014.
ZENON Environmental	GE Water & Process Technologies (General Electric)	United States	ZENON was a technology company originating in Hamilton, Ontario.

Existing companies formerly based in Canada

- Bauer, Cooper, and Hespeler, historic hockey-equipment manufacturers, were collectively bought by U.S.-based Nike in 1994.

== Rules and regulations ==
"Non-Canadian," for all intents and purposes, refers to entities based outside of Canada and to individuals who are not Canadian citizens or qualified permanent residents.

A business undertaking is considered to be 'Canadian' if it is Canadian-controlled, which generally mean:

- if one Canadian, or two or more Canadian members of a voting group, owns a majority of the voting interests of an entity, the entity is Canadian-controlled.
- if one non-Canadian, or two or more non-Canadian members of a voting group, owns a majority of the voting interests of an entity, the entity is not Canadian-controlled.

In regards to public companies, which are not controlled through the ownership of voting shares, the corporation is considered to be Canadian-controlled if at least two-thirds of the board of directors is Canadian.

Large foreign direct investments in Canada are governed under the federal Investment Canada Act (ICA). This act is primarily administered by Innovation, Science and Economic Development Canada, though defined "cultural businesses" are administered by the Department of Canadian Heritage.

Foreign corporations often incorporate branches or special-purpose subsidiaries within Canada in order to facilitate business and control their investments. Business profits earned in Canada by such a branch will be subject to regular federal and provincial corporate Income Taxes. An additional Federal Branch Tax is also applied on profits not reinvested in Canada. A tax treaty may provide for a reduced rate or exemption threshold for the Federal Branch Tax.

Various federal and provincial statutes place additional restrictions on foreign ownership in specific industries. Federal acts include:

- Bank Act — provides that no person may own and control more than 10% of the shares of a Schedule I bank.
- Broadcasting Act — bans broadcasting licenses from being issued to non-Canadians or to companies that are effectively owned or controlled, directly or indirectly, by non-Canadians.
- Telecommunications Act — restricts foreign ownership and control to 20% of the voting shares of a telecommunications common carrier.
- Insurance Companies Act — provides that no person may own and control more than 10% of the shares of a Canadian-owned life insurance company. (Manitoba legislation also places restrictions on foreign investment in the insurance industry.)

The New Brunswick Business Corporations Act, the Nova Scotia Companies Act, the Quebec Business Corporations Act, and the British Columbia Business Corporations Act make no stipulations that resident Canadians be directors. New Brunswick provides that Extra Provincial Corporations need only have an "attorney for service" resident in that province.

Unlimited liability corporations can exist in Alberta, British Columbia, or Nova Scotia. This form is particularly convenient where the parties are well-established and in no danger of insolvency. Alberta requires the derisory fee of CA$100 to establish this form. In most other provinces, the legislation is significantly more restrictive.

== See also ==
- Canadian nationalism
- Continentalism
- Foreign Investment Review Agency
- Economic nationalism
