= Water supply in Cambodia =

Water supply in Cambodia is characterized by a low level of access in rural areas compared to relatively high access to an improved water source in urban areas. In 2015, 76% of the population had access to "improved" water, 100% in urban areas and 76% in rural areas. Still, in 2015, around 9 million did not have access to "improved" water.

Within the government, urban water supply policy is the responsibility of the Ministry of Industry, Mines and Energy. Service provision in urban areas is the responsibility of two water utilities in the largest cities, the Phnom Penh Water Supply Authority (PPWSA) and the Siem Reap Water Supply Authority (SRWSA), 11 Provincial Water Supply Authorities (known as PWWKs) as well as 147 smaller utilities. The Department of Rural Water Supply (DRWS) and Department of Rural Health Care (DRHC) of the Ministry of Rural Development are responsible for rural water supply for the smaller towns and villages with less than 1,000 households.

The performance of the Provincial Water Supply Authorities, measured in terms of access, cost recovery through tariff revenues and non-revenue water, lags behind the performance of PPWSA which has improved its performance significantly in the late 1990s and early 2000s. In 2012 the government of Cambodia launched a plan to bring the performance of the provincial utilities to levels comparable to those achieved by PPWSA by 2015, including their financial autonomy.

In 2012 the Asian Development Bank approved a grant to provide technical assistance to the Ministry of Industry, Mines and Energy to support this process. Many international NGOs provide support for drinking water supply in Cambodia through local NGOs, including Oxfam in Pursat Province or Water for Cambodia that installs biosand filters in rural areas, runs the only water-testing laboratory outside the capital and promotes water literacy.

== See also ==
- Phnom Penh Water Supply Authority
