= Jason Michael Morgan =

American historian (born 1977)

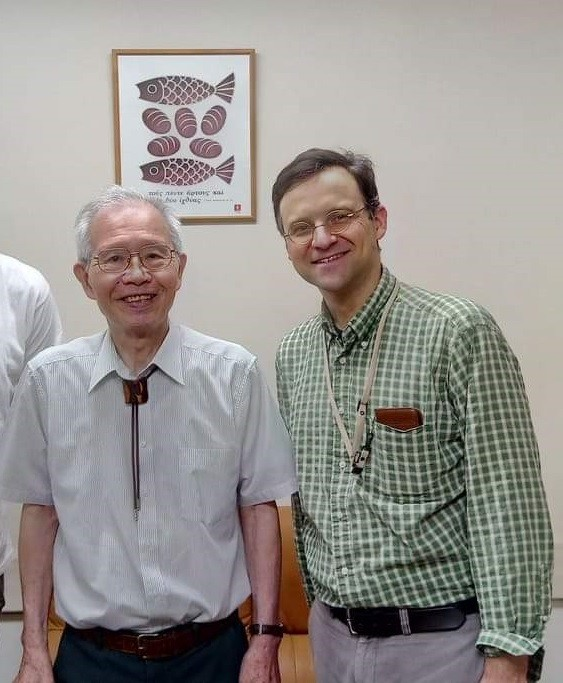
- Morgan in 2019 with Pastor Tsujioka (left)
- Born: 1977 (age 48–49); Louisiana, U.S
- Occupations: Scholar, historian

Jason Michael Morgan (born 1977) is an American historian, scholar of Japanese history, and associate professor in the Faculty of International Studies at Reitaku University.

== Backgrounds ==
Morgan was born in Louisiana, the United.States. According to him, "Part of my ancestry is Cherokee Indian,"

In 2021, He graduated from Holy Apostles College and Seminary. He also became a speaker at Catholic Identity Conference held by The Remnant.

In 2024, the publisher Hojosha claimed that he was a devout Catholic, but as of October 10, 2025, Morgan stated that he had "left the Catholic Church."

He majored in history at the University of Tennessee, Chattanooga. He subsequently studied abroad at Nagoya University of Foreign Studies, the Graduate School of Nagoya University, and Yunnan University in Kunming, China. He subsequently pursued graduate studies at the University of Hawaii, specializing in East Asian Studies, particularly Chinese history. After graduation, he lived in Yeongyang County, North Gyeongsang Province, South Korea, working as an English teacher. He returned to Japan and engaged in translation and lecturing. From 2014 to 2015, he conducted research at the Graduate School of Law, Waseda University, as a Fulbright Scholar.

In 2016, he earned his PhD from the University of Wisconsin. PhD (Japanese History). After serving as a senior research fellow at the Japan Strategic Studies Forum, a general incorporated association, he became an assistant professor in the Faculty of Foreign Languages at Reitaku University in April 2017. He has been an associate professor in the Faculty of International Studies at the same university since April 2020.

== Views ==
=== Deep State ===
In December 2023, he made the following claims regarding the Deep State:

The true nature of the DS consists of the Central Intelligence Agency (CIA), the Federal Bureau of Investigation (FBI), the Department of Defense (Pentagon), the National Security Agency(NSA), the Internal Revenue Service, and globalists within both the Democratic and Republican parties."

"The CIA, the FBI, and globalists within the Democratic Party schemed to bring Trump down by any means necessary. … The CIA and FBI, which are supposed to follow the President, are trying to bring him down. This means that the President is not the one controlling the U.S. government. Yes, the U.S. is being controlled by the 'shadow government' known as the DS."

"Shall I name some of them? Former National Security Advisor John Bolton, former Director of National Intelligence James Clapper, former CIA Director John Brennan, former U.S. Ambassador to the UN Samantha Power, National Policy Council Chair Susan Rice, CIA Director William Burns, former FBI Director James Comey, former FBI Deputy Director Andrew McCabe, former CIA Director Leon Panetta, former CIA Director Michael Hayden… I think that's enough for now."

"If you claim the DS doesn't exist, I'd like you to refute, with concrete evidence, why the CIA and FBI pressured major social media platforms and engaged in information control."

=== Pro-Life ===
He supported pro-life.

In a 2022 video calling for participation in the March for Life in Tokyo, he stated: "The March for Life is an event that opposes the so-called 'culture of death' and the globalism—or, rather, the international elite—that seeks to impose it on the entire world. It is the most important event of its kind in Japan. There is likely no action in Japan more important than the March for Life. Babies, human life—from conception until natural death—every human being receives life from God, and so that we may cherish that life until its natural end, I earnestly ask you to participate in the March for Life if you have an opportunity."

In October of the same year, at the invitation of the Center for the Respect of Life, he served as one of the panelists at the House of Councillors Building tasked with persuading politicians and bureaucrats not to approve the use of oral abortion pills in Japan. He pointed out the thousands of side effects reported to the FDA, cited statistics on severe bleeding, hospitalizations, and deaths, spoke about the activities of Abby Johnson and Lila Rose, and recommended watching the anti-abortion film "Unplanned', repeatedly asserting, "There is no such thing as a safe abortion." "That is a myth. Abortion pills kill children and put their mothers in grave danger."

In 2023, he contributed an article mourning the late Reverend Kenzo Tsujioka, former representative of the Association for the Protection of Small Lives [8], and submitted comments opposing the approval of oral abortion pills to the Ministry of Health, Labour and Welfare's public comment process

=== Yasukuni Shrine ===
In 2019, Morgan made a speech at Yasukuni Shrine asserting that People enshrined were "sacrificing their own lives, for other people they fought to eliminate the white race domination from Asia, from India, Singapore and the Philippines, to force out the white race imperialists".

In 2024, in a dialogue with Toshio Motoya, founder of APA Group, Morgan said "For Japanese people to maintain their pride, the first step is for them to visit Yasukuni Jinja (for worship)".

=== Unification Church ===
Morgan has frequently contributed articles defending the Unification Church.

On April 12, 2025, in an interview by Asia Times with Satoshi Hamada, a member of the House of Councillors from the Party to Protect the People from NHK, regarding the request for a dissolution order against the Unification Church, Morgan claimed that "some believers are forcibly expelled, and this has often been carried out by kidnapping believers and been carried out by kidnapping believers and confining them against their will until they swear to leave the church."

The World Journal reported that Morgan "pointed out the alleged ties to a religious group originating in South Korea, stating that this was a political calculation to distance oneself by labeling it a dangerous organization, and emphasized that lawyers and activists are making a name for themselves by stirring up hatred toward Family Federation believers."

In an article titled "Why Is the Japanese Government Cracking Down on This Church?" published in the March/April 2026 issue of "The American Conservative", he presented the views of Tokushige Kondo, deputy director of the Legal Affairs Bureau of the church, and Patricia Duval, a French lawyer who handled the case regarding the church's human rights treatment in Japan at the United Nations.

== Awards ==
In 2024, he won the 7th Annual APA Japan Restoration Grand Prize for his book "Why I Bow My Head at Yasukuni Shrine"

== See also ==
- The American Conservative
- Greater East Asia Co-Prosperity Sphere
- New Oxford Review
- The Remnant
- Unification Church
- Yasukuni Shrine
