= Seiji Yoshida =

Yūto Yoshida (吉田 雄兎, Yoshida Yūto; 15 October 1913 – 30 July 2000) was a Japanese novelist and later, a member of the Japanese Communist Party. He has published under a variety of pen names, including Seiji Yoshida (吉田 清治, Yoshida Seiji), Tōji Yoshida (吉田 東司, Yoshida Tōji), and Eiji Yoshida (吉田 栄司, Yoshida Eiji). He wrote "My war crimes", a biography that intensified the raging discussion over comfort women 30 years after World War II; Later his work was used by George Hicks in his "The Comfort Women: Japan's Brutal Regime of Enforced Prostitution in the Second World War".

== Early life ==
Originally from Yamaguchi Prefecture on the Sea of Japan, Yoshida was stationed in Korea, then a colony of Japan, during World War II; he claimed that he assisted police to kidnap over 2,000 women from various rural areas of the Korean peninsula to serve as comfort women. After the war, he ran as a Japanese Communist Party candidate in the 1947 Shimonoseki city council elections, but was defeated.

== Memoirs controversy ==
In 1977 and again in 1983, Yoshida published memoirs about his actions during the war. His books and a subsequent 1991 media interview have been credited with bringing about an apology to Korea by Foreign Affairs minister Yōhei Kōno. As Yoshida's memoirs became widely known, he began to attract suspicion. Ikuhiko Hata, a historian at Takushoku University and one of Yoshida's leading critics, pointed to inconsistencies between Yoshida's 1977 and 1983 memoirs, using these to assert that his claims are fabricated. Ikuhiko Hata also threw doubt on the fact that Yuto Yoshida was carried on the list of 1931 graduates from Moji Commercial School as deceased. South Korean newspaper interviews with residents of Jeju Island, where the forced recruitment allegedly took place, found no one who admitted to remembering a sweep through a button factory there which Yoshida detailed in his 1983 memoirs.

In May 1996, weekly magazine Shūkan Shinchō published remarks by Yoshida made to them in an interview, admitting that portions of his work had been made up. He stated that "There is no profit in writing the truth in books. Hiding the facts and mixing your own assertions into the story is something that newspapers do too". The publisher of his book, Sanichi Shobou, also admitted that it was a novel, while being interviewed by NHK. In June 2009, Lee Young-hoon, a professor of Seoul National University, argued that Yoshida's testimony has spread among Korean society after Yoshida published books.

Tessa Morris-Suzuki and others argue that historians seeking to deny or downplay the existence of comfort women commonly mention Yoshida and his testimony since then and that the inaccuracy of Yoshida's claims are used to cast doubt on the existence or extent of forced prostitution under Japanese rule in World War II.

On August 5, 2014, Asahi Shimbun announced that they came to the conclusion that the testimony of Yoshida was a fabrication. In April and May 2014, the Asahi Shimbun dispatched reporters to Jeju Island and interviewed about 40 elderly residents and concluded that Yoshida's accounts "are false" because they did not find supporting evidence for it. Asahi Shimbun retracted all 16 articles based on his testimony in the 1980s and 1990s. The President of Asahi Shimbun later made an apology for the errors and an editor was fired as a result.

According to his son's testimony in the Sankei Shimbun, he was poor before publishing and worked for a bakery run by a Korean. Yoshida frequently applied for essay contests for prize money and he won by a fictional story about slavery workforce during the war. Later, this story was used by Korea University educator Park Kyung-sik (朴慶植) and quoted in “Record of Korean forced compulsion”.

=== Yoshida's memoirs ===
"We grabbed screaming infants from the women's arms before forcing the women into trucks and shipping them to the front lines in China to serve in brothels for Japan's invasion force. The screaming was terrible, but that was my routine throughout 1943 and 1944,"

"We would use 5 or 10 trucks, and sweep the villages, choosing two or three young women from each who would be suitable."

"We had seized perhaps 2,000 women."

"It was just like kidnapping. It may be the worst abuse of human rights in Asia in this century."

== Impact ==
- In 1982, The Asahi Shimbun reported the remarks of Yoshida for the first time.

"... hunted up 200 young Korean women in Jeju Island."

- In 1992, The New York Times reported Yoshida's confession.
- In 1995, Australian journalist George L. Hicks wrote a book titled The Comfort Women: Sex Slaves of the Japanese Imperial Forces. In his book, he states that slave hunting was conducted whenever other methods failed, based on Yoshida's book.
- In 1996, Radhika Coomaraswamy compiled a report so called Coomaraswamy report for U.N. Commission on Human Right. In the report, the testimony of Yoshida was used as an evidence of abduction of Korean women organized by the Japanese Government.

"... Moreover, the wartime experiences of one raider, Yoshida Seiji, are recorded in his book, in which he confesses to having been part of slave raids in which, among other Koreans, as many as 1,000 women were obtained for "comfort women" duties under the National Labour Service Association as part of the National General Mobilization Law."

- In 1999, Patricia Morley wrote in her book titled The Mountain is Moving: Japanese Women's Lives that the official involvement of the government of Japan citing Yoshida's confession.

"Soldiers of many nations have committed atrocities in war, but the story of these women has a shocking difference. The enslavement was an official activity ordered by the highest authority in Japan. Everything went through proper channels, from the Cabinet to the Army Ministry and then to local governors and on to soldiers like Seiji Yoshida, whose job was to go on field trips to Korea, accompanied by subordinates and police officers, hunting for women to imprison in Imperial Army brothels. The result was a system of nationalized sexual slavery unique in modern times. Once again, women were regarded simply as commodities. Yoshida, a director of mobilization for Yamaguchi Prefecture during the war, spoke out in 1991 and published a book about the events. He had been only one of thousands of employees of the Patriotic Labour Association involved in conscripting labourers and sex slaves in the colonies.^{41} After speaking out, Yoshida was denounced by veterans' associations and became the target of death threats."

Some historians say the impact of the Yoshida's testimonies were minimal because they have been refuted and rejected by virtually all historians during the 1990s. However they are often cited by influential reports and media after 2000. Some examples are as follows:

- In 2001, Therese Park who is an author of A Gift of the Emperor wrote that Yoshida's book validated what she was writing about comfort women in her writing To Give a Voice in a book titled Legacies of the Comfort Women of World War II.

"My Wartime Crime, the published confession of Seiji Yoshida, a former Japanese military officer, validated what I was writing about and fueled my imagination. Had I not known so much already about the issues of "comfort women" and of Japan's cruelty to Koreans, I would have thought he was a good storyteller. His tale of rounding up more than two thousand girls from Korean towns and, without any guilt, of sending them to brothels was simply mind-boggling. What was his purpose in confessing his crimes fifty years later? To comfort his victims or himself? Obviously, he was worried about his redemption after death."

- In 2004, Takesato Watanabe a professor of Doshisha University accused Akira Nakamura's statement "no one has ever claimed that the comfort women were gathered up en masses in urban areas." citing Yoshida's books in his book titled A Public Betrayed: An Inside Look at Japanese Media Atrocities and Their Warnings to the West.
- In 2006, his book was used as an evidence for the abduction of women in a Congressional Report which was prepared for the United States House of Representatives House Resolution 121 in 2007.

"An early detailed revelation came from Yoshida Seiji, a former Japanese military policeman, who wrote a book in 1983 entitled My War Crimes: The Forced Draft of Koreans in which he described his participation in the roundup of over 1,000 women in Korea for service as “comfort women” to the Japanese military."

- In 2007, The Chosun Ilbo reported the Yoshida's testimonies in response to Japanese Prime Minister Shinzo Abe's statement at a parliamentary panel that Japan will not issue an apology for forcing women to act as sex slaves for its soldiers during World War II:

"Many Japanese officials have revealed this in several testimonies. The best-known testimony proving Tokyo's role in forcibly mobilizing sex slaves comes from Yoshida Seiji, who was in charge of drafting women in the southern part of the Korean Peninsula from 1943 to August of 1945. His testimony, which was published in an interview with a newspaper in 1991, raised a furor and led to the Kono apology."

- In 2007, JoongAng Ilbo wrote about the Kono Statement which was criticized as being based on the false testimony of Yoshida. JoongAng Ilbo insisted that not all the testimony was fabricated saying "However, Yoshida didn't deny the forced mobilization itself. He erected a monument of apology in Cheonan in South Korea at his own expense."
- In 2009, Young-hee Shim claimed that Yoshida confessed because of a traditional Buddhist belief that one should confess to one's sins and crimes before death in a book titled Legal Institutions and Collective Memories.
- In 2012, The Chosun Ilbo introduced the book of Yoshida in detail as an evidence of the abduction and forced roundup of comfort women by the Japanese military. The article was translated into Japanese and Chinese, and further published in Korea Focus in English.
- In 2024, legal scholar J. Mark Ramseyer and historian Jason M. Morgan examined Yoshida's discredited accounts in their book The Comfort Women Hoax: A Fake Memoir, North Korean Spies, and Hit Squads in the Academic Swamp. The authors argued that Yoshida's writings had influenced subsequent representations of the comfort women system and criticized their use in historical scholarship.

== Works ==
- 吉田清治 [Seiji Yoshida] (March 1977). 朝鮮人慰安婦と日本人 [Korean comfort women and Japanese people]. 新人物往来社 [Shin Jinbutsu Ōraisha]. ISBN 978-4-404-00795-7. OCLC 23327293.
- 吉田清治 [Seiji Yoshida] (January 1983). 私の戦争犯罪―朝鮮人強制連行 [My war crimes—the forced transport of Koreans]. 三一書房 [San'ichi Shobō]. OCLC 13784662.
  - Translated into Korean as Seiji Yoshida (吉田淸治) (요시다세이지) (1989). 나는 조선사람을 이렇게 잡아갔다 -나의 전쟁범죄 고백 [I kidnapped Koreans like this - confession of my war crimes]. 청계연구소 [Cheonggye Yeonguso]. OCLC 21073210.

== See also ==
- Asahi Shimbun Comfort Women reporting problem
