= Foreign ownership =

Form of ownership

Foreign ownership refers to the ownership of a portion of a country's assets (businesses, natural resources, property, bonds, equity, etc.) by individuals who are not citizens of that country or by companies whose headquarters are not in that country.

Foreign ownership of assets is widespread in a modern, globally integrated economy, at both the corporate and individual levels. An example of the former is when a corporation acquires part, or all, of another company headquartered overseas, or when it purchases property, infrastructure, access rights or other assets in countries abroad. If a multinational corporation acquires at least half of a foreign company, the multinational corporation becomes a holding company, and the company receiving the foreign investment becomes a subsidiary.

At the individual level, foreign ownership occurs whenever a domestic asset is acquired by a foreign individual, such as an Indian businessman buying a house in Hong Kong, or a Russian citizen purchasing United States Treasury bonds.

== Benefits ==
- The transfer of technology and organisational knowledge can lead to higher productivity, and the company in the host country can learn from multinational corporations.
- It increases employment and wages, as inward foreign direct investment has an overall positive effect in employment, given that companies have more capital to expand.
- It lowers prices and improves the quality of products as a result of higher productivity, which is beneficial for consumers and the company's competitiveness for exports.

== Drawbacks ==
- Foreign ownership can increase the demand of products, leading to price increases.
- The increase in productivity in the firms in foreign ownership can cause other domestic companies to become relatively less competitive, which reduces profits.
- Multinational corporations may use their power to influence government policies, especially in underdeveloped countries, which may have an adverse impact on economic development.
- Lowering of employment because of operational optimization or an increase by a planned expansion can occur. Wages can be reduced for new employees by new corporate policies, and an optimized employee benefits package can reduce benefits for all.
- The demise of local economies can be caused by siphoning money from communities to global elites.

== Policies by location ==
=== Africa ===
==== Maldives ====
Foreigners are not allowed to own freehold land in the Maldives. The land can only be leased to foreigners for 99 years.

=== Americas ===
==== United States ====
Some countries such as the United States may state that a foreign transfer of ownership will be challenged or prohibited based on the assumption that a deal may pose a challenge to the country's national security.

=== Asia ===
==== Cambodia ====
Under Article 44 of the Cambodian Constitution, “only natural persons or legal entities of Khmer nationality shall have the right to land ownership.” Foreigners are prohibited to own or possess land in Cambodia.

==== China ====
Land in China is state-owned or collectively owned. Enterprises, farmers, and householders lease land from the state using long-term leases of 20 to 70 years. Foreign investors are not allowed to buy or own land in China.

==== Indonesia ====
Foreigners are not allowed to own freehold land in Indonesia. Foreign investors can legally hold leasehold titles under Right-To-Use (Hak Pakai) or building rights (Hak Guna Bangunan). This is based on Part 5 Article 36 Paragraph 1b of the Agrarian Law No 5 of 1960.

The House of Representatives of Indonesia passed the plantation bill to set stricter rules on foreign ownership in the plantation sector to prioritise smaller local plantation firms. There is no specific percentage value on the limit on foreign ownership, but a 30% foreign ownership ceiling had been demanded by the House's Commission IV.

Plantation business groups as well as the Ministry of Agriculture had previously voiced criticism of the bill, expressing concern that it would negatively impact plantation firms and growers, as foreign investment might be reduced.

Even though the bill was passed to limit foreign ownership, the law encourages cooperation in research and development between domestic and foreign businesses, universities, and individuals.

A reduction in foreign ownership limit may reduce foreign investment, but it can help boost revenue for domestic firms and economic development.

Government Regulation No. 14 of 2018 limited foreign ownership in insurance companies to 80%. However, this rule is not applied retroactively for insurance companies with foreign ownership higher than 80% at the time of its implementation date of 20 January 2020.

==== Iran ====
Article 81 of the Constitution places restrictions on the foreign ownership of Iranian businesses.

==== Kazakhstan ====
In 2021, President Kassym-Jomart Tokayev signed into law a bill that bans the selling and leasing of agricultural land to foreigners.

==== Kuwait ====
Foreigners in Kuwait except GCC nationals are prohibited from land ownership.

==== Laos ====
Foreigners are prohibited from permanent ownership of land. Foreigners can only lease land for a period of up to 30 years.

==== Mongolia ====
Only Mongolian citizens can own the land within the territory of Mongolia. Foreign citizens can only lease the land.

==== Myanmar ====
Though purchase of land is not permitted to foreigners, a real estate investor may apply for a 70-year leasehold with a Myanmar Investment Commission (MIC) permit.

==== Philippines ====
Foreign citizens and companies are prohibited from fully owning land in the Philippines under the 1987 Constitution.

There is also a 40 percent cap imposed on foreign ownership of companies, with exemptions such as firms engaged in the telecommunications, airlines, shipping, railways and irrigation sectors. An exemption also applies to the renewable energy sector.

==== Qatar ====
As part of financial reforms, Qatar's emir has issued a law, allowing foreign investors to obtain up to 49% of listed Qatari companies for expansion in the stock market and to stimulate development in the financial industry.

Prior to the law, ceilings on listed Qatari firms restricted foreign ownership to 25%.

The reform aims to help attract more foreign investment in the long run. However, according to a wealth manager in the Gulf, "It's a step in the right direction, but it will have to be backed up by good performance from companies in order to attract foreign investment. Also, there should be limited impact from the law in the short term due to liquidity issues and limited numbers of shares available."

==== Russia ====
In 2014, the Russian Duma passed a law reducing the foreign ownership ceiling for print publications and radio and television outlets from 50% to 20%; it was passed with a vote of 430-2. The legislation, which came into force in 2016, forbids foreign governments, organisations, companies, and individuals from founding or holding more than a 20% stake in Russian media businesses.

According to Vadim Dengin, one of the bill's authors, "the tighter limit on foreign ownership would help protect Russia from western influence." However, publishers and editors of independent media companies in Russia argued that the new law would further reduce diversity of opinion.

==== Sri Lanka ====
In 2014, the Sri Lankan parliament passed a law banning land purchases by foreigners. The new act allows foreigners to acquire land only on a lease basis of up to 99 years, with an annual 15 percent tax on the total rental paid upfront.

==== Thailand ====
In Thailand, foreigners are prohibited to own or possess land.

==== Vietnam ====
Foreigners cannot buy and own land, like in many other Southeast Asian countries. Instead, the land is collectively owned by all Vietnamese people, but governed by the state. As written in the national Land Law, foreigners and foreign organizations are allowed to lease land. The leasehold period is up to 50 years.

=== Europe ===
==== Belarus ====
According to the legislation of Belarus, a foreign citizen cannot own land, and only has the right to rent it.

==== Georgia ====
Since 2017, a ban on foreigners owning farmland was introduced in Georgia's new constitution. The new constitution states that, with a few exceptions, agricultural land can only be owned by the state, a Georgian citizen, or a Georgian-owned entity.

==== Israel ====
Approximately 7% of the allocated land in Israel is privately owned. The rest, i.e., 93%, is owned by the State and is known as “Israeli Land”. Israel’s Basic Law on real estate states that Israel’s land is jointly owned by the State (69%), the Development Authority (12%), and the Jewish National Fund (12%).

== See also ==
- Alien land laws
- Foreign Investment Review Agency (Canada)
- Holding company
- Subsidiary
- Foreign ownership of companies of Canada
- Office of Foreign Assets Control (United States)
- Foreign direct investment
- Foreign portfolio investment
- Land tenure
