= CSX (disambiguation) =

CSX Transportation is a United States railroad company.

CSX may also refer to:

- CSX Corporation, the above railroad system's parent company
- IATA code for Changsha Huanghua International Airport
- Cambodia Securities Exchange
- Shelby CSX, a limited-production performance automobile based on the Dodge Shadow
- Acura CSX, an entry-level luxury car from Acura, designed and sold in Canada
- Centre-left coalition, an alliance of political parties in Italy
