= Motoya =

Motoya (written: 本谷 or 元谷) is a Japanese surname. Notable people with the surname include:

- Toshio Motoya (元谷 外志雄; 1943–2026), Japanese writer, publisher and businessman
- Yukiko Motoya (本谷 有希子; born 1979), Japanese writer, playwright and theatre director
