= Phnom Penh Water Supply Authority =

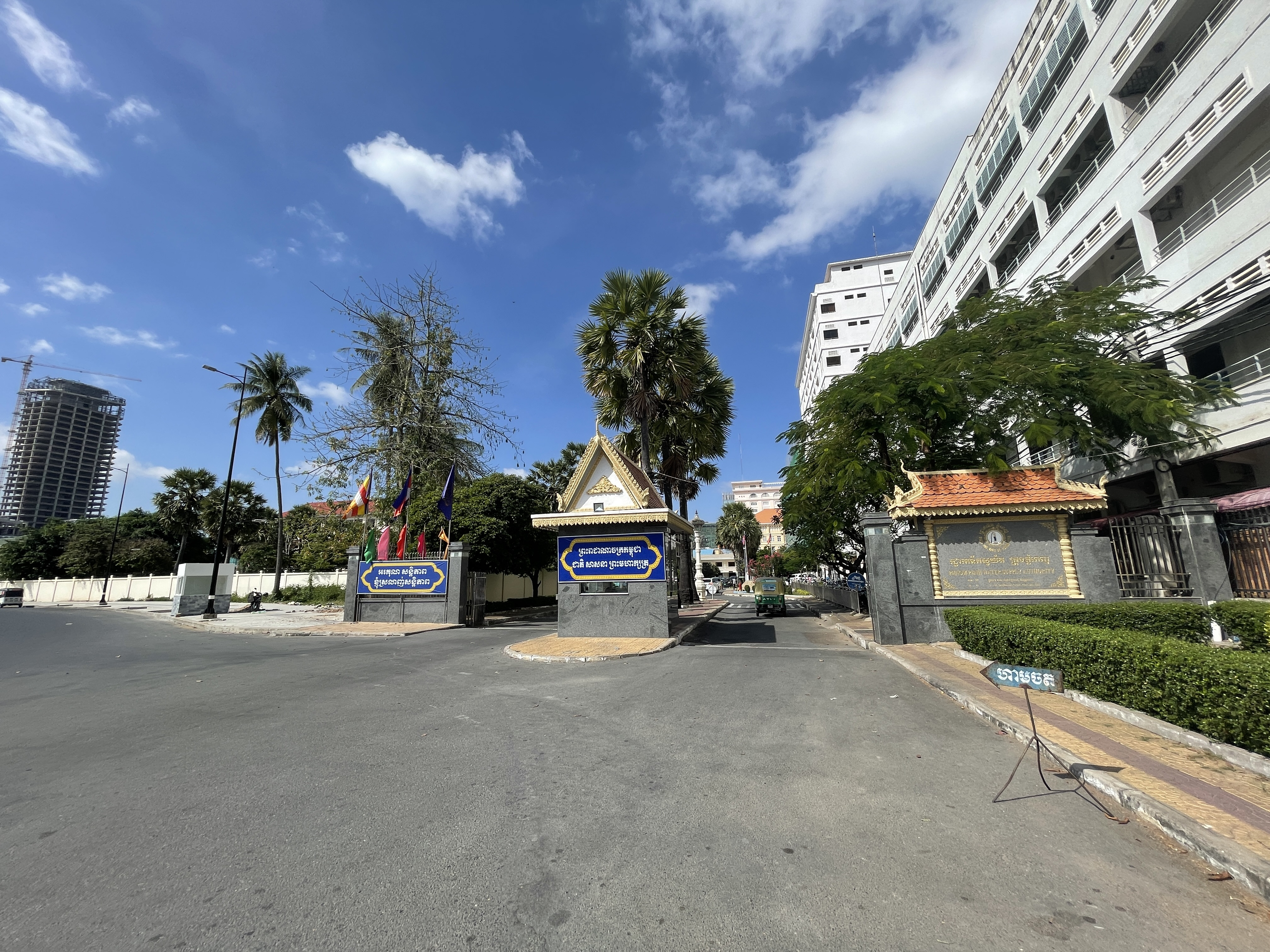
Headquarter of Phnom Penh Water Supply Authority (PPWSA)

The Phnom Penh Water Supply Authority (PPWSA) (Khmer: រដ្ឋាករទឹកស្វយ័តក្រុងភ្នំពេញ) is the municipal water utility that serves Cambodia's capital Phnom Penh and surrounding areas.

In 1992 it provided low-quality piped water at very low pressure (0.2 bar) for only 10 hours per day to only 20% of the city's residents. Non-revenue water was extremely high at 72% due to illegal connections, manipulation of bills and physical leakage. Tariffs were extremely low, there was no metering and less than half of the amounts billed were collected. Staff were underpaid and demoralized. The utility then underwent a dramatic turnaround—staff engaged in corrupt activities were fired, bill payment was enforced, illegal connections were regularized, metering was introduced and the utility gained autonomy from the municipality in financial and personnel matters.

In the next fourteen years the customer base multiplied by nine reaching over 90% of residents, service quality improved from intermittent to continuous supply of safe drinking water at good pressure of 2 bar, and non-revenue water was cut to only 6%. Tariffs were increased and the utility went from being bankrupt to making a modest profit. It now has motivated, well-paid staff. According to one observer, in 2012 its "public image is excellent".

The key to its success laid in "leadership, professionalism, integrity (and) commitment" as well as "community participation and information sharing (...), good governance, transparency and accountability". Significant financial support from external donors, initially through grants and then through soft loans, also was essential in making the turnaround possible. PPWSA's achievements were recognized through international awards, including the Ramon Magsaysay Award for Government Service in 2006 and the Stockholm Industry Water Award in 2010.

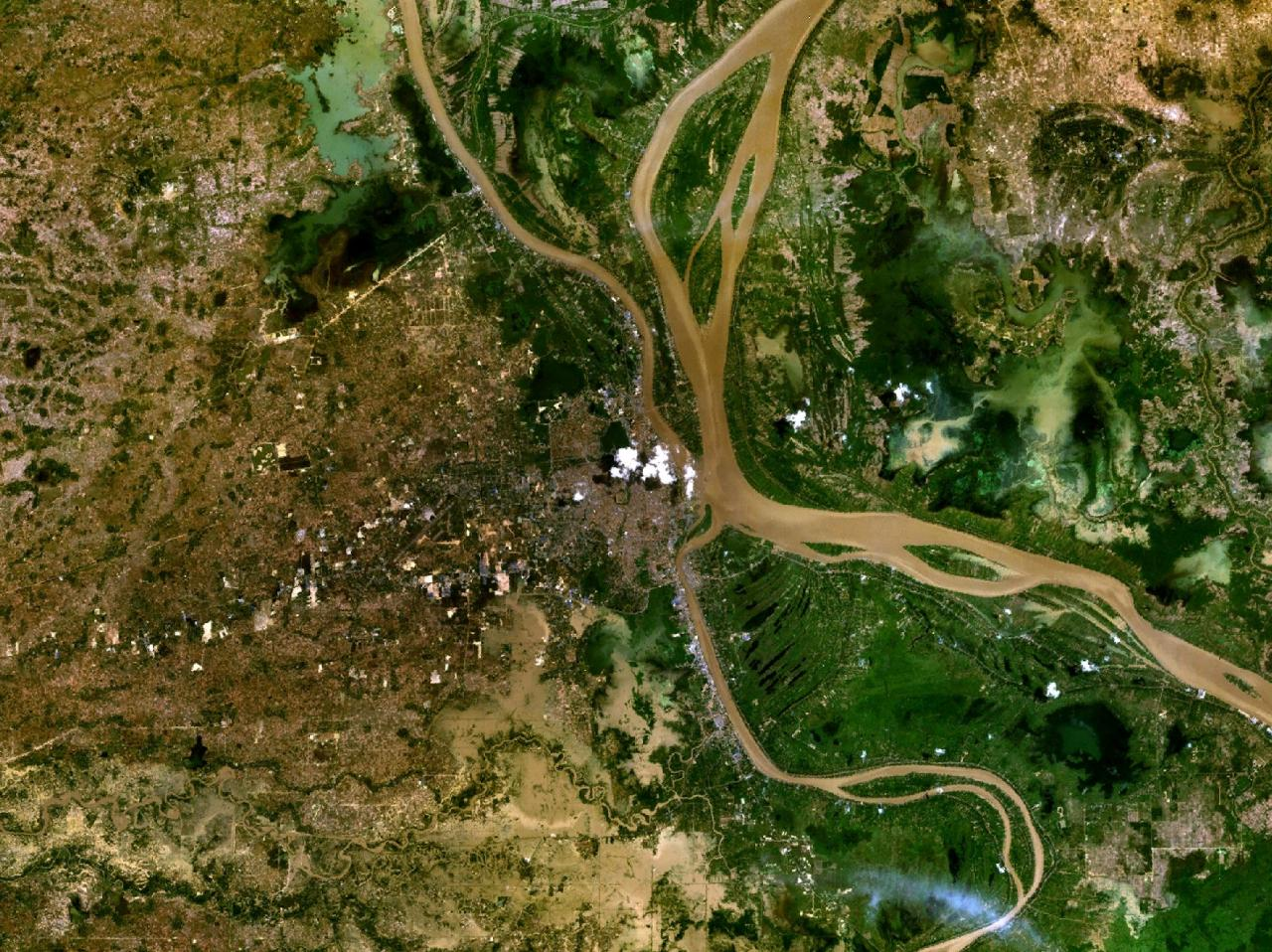
A satellite picture of Phnom Penh during the wet season in May 2005. The Mekong River flows towards the city from the North, while the Tonle Sap River is visible in the Northwest.

== Climate and water resources ==
Phnom Penh, the capital of Cambodia, is located on the Mekong River. The flow of the Mekong River during the dry season depends heavily on the Tonlé Sap Lake located about 100 km to the northwest of the city. The lake stores water during the wet season and releases it during the dry season, acting as an important buffer. The Tonlé Sap River between Phnom Penh and the lake reverses its flow twice a year, first filling and then draining the lake.

Surface water is the main source of drinking water, complemented by groundwater. Surface water is abstracted from the Mekong River, the Tonle Sap and the Bassac River. It is treated in three treatment plants: Phum Prek with a capacity of 150,000 m^{3}/day, Cham Car Morn (20,000 m^{3}/day) and Chruoy Chang War (150,000 m^{3}/day). The first phase of a fourth plant at Niroth was completed in June 2013 with a capacity of 130,000 m^{3}/day, to be followed by a second phase with the same capacity to be completed in 2016.

== History ==
=== Origins ===
The Phnom Penh Water Supply Authority was officially established by King Norodom Sihanouk on March 24, 1960, under Royal Decree No. 164NS. The decree mandated that PPWSA manage Phnom Penh’s water treatment and supply and ensure a “balance of income and expenses in relation to its water treatment investment”.

=== Decades of decline ===
Though initially successful, PPWSA operations suffered under the country’s political turmoil of the 1960s, the Khmer Rouge’s ascension into power in the late 1970s and the ensuing two decades of conflict (for more details see Modern Cambodia). Starved of investment, by 1990 the PPWSA was virtually dysfunctional. The consequences were severe. Unaccounted for water (UFW) exceeded 80% in Phnom Penh. Almost a third of all hospitalizations were linked to water-related diseases, diarrheal diseases were endemic and Cambodia had one of the highest infant mortality rates in the world.

Only 20–25% of the population were served by piped water and even those received water only 10 hours per day; the workers were underpaid, demoralized and corrupt, helping customers get illegal connections and avoid paying bills; and, due to this state of affairs, combined with very low tariffs and overstaffing, not even a fraction of operating costs were recovered from water users making the utility effectively bankrupt.

=== The turnaround 1993–2006 ===
A landmark election brought peace to Cambodia in 1993. External donors started to engage in the country, providing funding for public investments. The newly appointed General Director of the PPWSA, Ek Sonn Chan, began by firing corrupt and incompetent staff, apparently at great personal risk. He said about PPWSA when he took over that “It was bureaucratic and it was full of incompetent staffers. I fired many staff and my friends told me that I would be assassinated”.

The remaining staff was encouraged to provide information about illegal connections and received incentive payments. Promotions were based on merit. This created a culture of loyalty and pride among water management employees. Then the utility began a campaign to convince customers that they had to pay their bills if they wanted quality service and slapped heavy fines on illegal connections. Ek Son Chan was even threatened with a gun by an army officer when he tried to cut off the water supply.

PPSWA also introduced a computerized billing system and exclusive payment in the offices of the utility, which reduced the opportunities for small-scale corruption under the previous systems had been issued manually and bills had been collected by bill collectors. Furthermore, meters were installed on all connections and a customer database and information system were developed, which became operational in 1994. Full metering was achieved in 1997 and tariffs were restructured and increased in the same year.

In 1996 PPWSA was established by decree as an autonomous public utility with its own separate finances, as opposed to being a department of the municipality as it had been the case previously. The utility's seven-member board comprises the General Director, representatives of the Ministry of Industry, Mines and Energy (chair), the Ministry of Economy and Finance, the Ministry of Interior, Phnom Penh’s municipal government and PPWSA employees. Its newly gained autonomy allowed the utility to retain any revenues in excess of operating costs to improve services. It also allowed it to recruit its own staff, which had not been possible previously when it had been part of the municipality. One observers called this "perhaps the most important factor in PPWSA's turnaround".

After old pipes had been replaced in the city center, the network was expanded to increase access. Pipes were laid following state-of-the-art techniques in order to ensure that leakage from the new pipes would be low. The utility also provided house connections to slum residents, which previously paid about five times more than the water tariff because they depended on "community representatives" who actually abused their power and resold water at higher than authorized prices. Initially, even slum residents had to pay full connections fees, but in 1999 payment in installments was allowed and in 2004–2006 subsidized connection fees were gradually introduced. By 2006 all performance indicators had been substantially improved, in essence completing the turnaround of the utility.

=== Initial Public Offering (2012) ===
On April 18, 2012, PPWSA became the first domestically listed company on the Cambodia Securities Exchange. Its shares went up 48 percent on the first day of trading, but then declined to their initial price. On July 1, 2012, the Ministry retired Ek Sonn Chan and replaced him by Sim Sitha, the director of the private water company that supplies the coastal tourist city Sihanoukville. Shortly afterwards Ek Sonn Chan was appointed Under-Secretary of State for Water at the Cambodian Ministry of Industry, Mines and Energy.

== Results ==
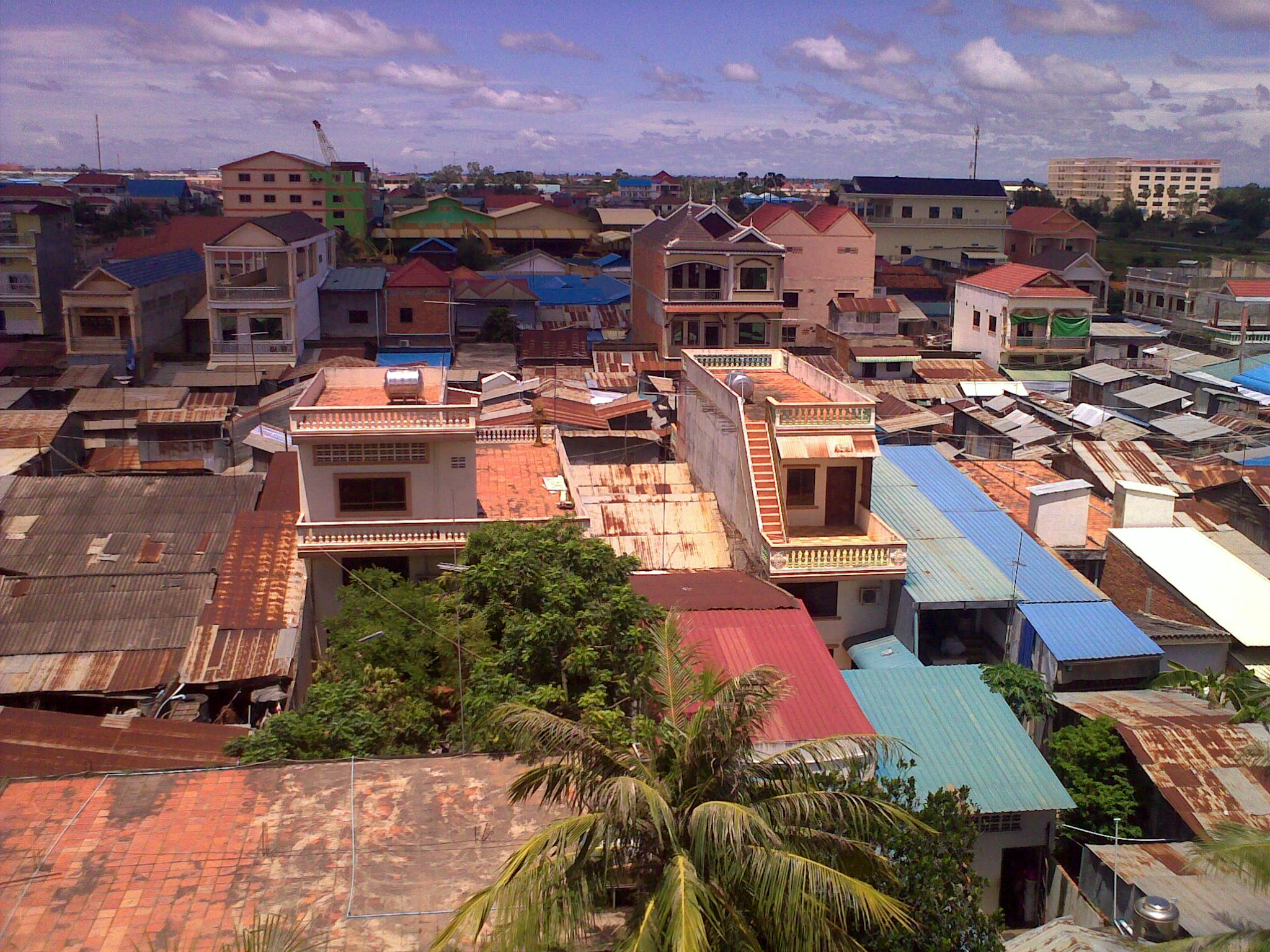
Rooftops in Phnom Penh. The share of the population with access to piped water supply increased from 25% in 1993 to 92% in 2010.

=== Increased access ===
The number of customers increased more than fivefold, leading to an increase in the served population from 25% (1993) to 92% (2010). The capacity of the distribution network was increased from 65,000 m^{3}/day to 320,000 m^{3}/day in 2012. Water vendors which charged up to five times more for water than what consumers pay to the utility now have all but disappeared from the PPWSA service area.

=== Improved water quality ===
Drinking water quality has improved and the director says he is drinking the tap water without boiling and challenged his customers: “If you get stomach ache after drinking the tap water, I will pay you compensation”.

=== Reaching the poorest ===
PPWSA established a revolving fund to finance domestic connections to help the poorest connect to the network. The utility serves more than 27,000 families (14% of all customers) in more than 123 urban poor communities at subsidized tariffs and connection fees, which can be paid in installments. Poor households are entitled to receive subsidies of 30%, 50%, 70% or 100% of the connection fee, depending upon their financial conditions.

These conditions are jointly evaluated by a committee of the utility and local communities, with results being published. This approach to reach the poor was found after several years of experimentation with unsuccessful approaches. For example, the reselling of water to the poor through "community representatives", an approach that works well in Manila, Philippines, had failed in Phnom Penh because the "community representatives" resold water at much higher prices than agreed.

=== Engaging with communities ===
The utility developed a close relationship with its customers. For example, it provided incentives to members of the public who reported illegal connections and it has set up an effective system to register and resolve complaints. This, together with the fight against small-scale corruption and improvements in service quality, helped to gain public acceptance for tariff increases.

=== Improved finances ===
Meters were installed for all water connections, the billing system was computerized and non-payment penalties were introduced. As a result, collection efficiency for residential customers increased from 48% to 99.9%. Tariffs were increased in 1994, 1997 and 2001, every time with the required approval of the Prime Minister. In 1995 the utility began to make small profits, which increased substantially after 2000. Is operating revenue for the 2008 financial year was $21.9 million, out of which it made a profit of $7.3 million on which it paid corporate income tax. In 1996 the utility had proposed a three-step tariff increase over seven years to reach the government's policy goal of full cost recovery. The third step proved to be unnecessary given the substantial efficiency improvements achieved by PPWSA.

=== Affordability ===
In 2013 the lowest block of the residential water tariff up to a consumption of 7m^{3} per month was 550 Cambodian riel ($0.13) per m^{3}, followed by a second block up to 15m^{3} at 770 Riel ($0.19) per m^{3}. A typical residential water bill is US$3–5 per month, around 1 percent of the average income. Tariffs in Phnom Penh are much lower than in some other Southeast Asian cities such as East Manila ($0.33/m^{3} in 2008), Kuala Lumpur ($0.45/m^{3} in 2007) or Jakarta ($0.70/m^{3} in 2005). This can in part be explained by the proximity of Phnom Penh to the abundant water resource of the Mekong River, but mainly by the efficiency of the utility's operations.

=== Improved efficiency ===
Non-revenue water, an indicator of operational efficiency, was reduced from 72% in 1996 to 6% in 2010. The number of staff per 1,000 connections was reduced from 22 to 3 in 2010, indicating substantially increased labor productivity. Since the number of connections increased more than fivefold, the actual number of staff remained about the same, while they were much more productively employed.

=== Motivated and qualified staff ===
Staff salaries increased substantially during the reform process. For example, a staff member at a managerial position who was paid $20 in 1993 received $200 in 2008. Profits are shared with employees. The utility has created a retirement system for its employees which is the first of its kind in Cambodia. It evaluates its employees four times a year and can provide financial incentives as well as disciplinary actions such as delays in salary increases or even salary deductions. The utility also provides substantial training, followed by exams.

== External cooperation ==
External cooperation played a major role in bringing about the turnaround of the Phnom Penh water utility. During the first years the utility relied on grants, while after its financial situation improved and it became an administratively and financially separate entity it also took up loans. Japan ($85 million in grants), France ($21 million in grants and $14 million in loans), the World Bank ($29 million in loans), the Asian Development Bank ($13 million in loans) and UNEP provided financial and technical assistance to PPWSA. The external financial assistance totalled approximately $165 million between 1993 and 2009.

The PPWSA also established twinning arrangements between two Australian water utilities and PPWSA. PPWSA has worked continuously with the French engineering company SAFEGE for more than twenty years. SAFEGE input has been used over a wide range of topics related to the engineering of water production and distribution systems.

== Governance context ==
=== Corruption ===
In 2010 Cambodia was ranked 154th out of 178 countries in the world in terms of corruption perception in a ranking published by Transparency International, indicating a very high level of perceived corruption (see Corruption Perceptions Index). Hun Sen, the current Prime Minister and strong man of Cambodia since 1985, and other senior officials in the Cambodian government have been accused by Global Witness and others of being involved in large-scale corruption.

At the same time, PPWSA's efforts to combat small-scale corruption have been well recognized. It thus seems that large-scale corruption at the highest political level and eradicating small-scale corruption at the utility level can coexist. Ek Son Chan, General Director of PPWSA, has thanked Prime Minister Hun Sen for his support in achieving the turnaround of the utility by calling on customers to pay their bills, approving tariff increases and not interfering in managerial decisions.

=== Role of public and private sector ===
Concerning the debate about the role of the public and private sector in water supply, Ek Sonn Chan commented that, “it doesn’t matter whether water distribution is done by the private sector or a public agency, as long as these institutions are transparent, independent from political pressures, and accountable.”

== Awards ==
PPWSA received the 2004 Asian Development Bank Water Prize for "dramatically overhauling Phnom Penh's water supply system and demonstrating leadership and innovation in project financing and governance". In 2006 Ek Sonn Chan was awarded the Ramon Magsaysay Award – the Asian equivalent of the Nobel prize - for Government Service. In 2010 PPWSA receives the Stockholm Industry Water Award.

== See also ==
- Water supply in Cambodia
