= Coast Hotels =

North American hotel chain

- Type: Subsidiary
- Industry: Hospitality
- Area served: Pacific Northwest (US and Canada)
- Services: Guest services, hotels
- Parent: APA Group
- Website: coasthotels.com

Coast Hotels is a mid-range hotel chain in western North America with over 46 hotels and resorts in the US states of Alaska, Washington, Hawaii, California, and in the Canadian provinces of British Columbia, Alberta, Saskatchewan and Yukon. The chain has been a subsidiary of the Japan-based APA Group since 2016. APA Group has caused some controversy in the past due to their owner's far right Japanese nationalist books distributed in APA's Japanese properties. Controversy extended to Canada in 2017 when antisemitic remarks by founder and CEO of APA Group, Toshio Motoya, were distributed in Coast Hotels Canadian properties.

Coast Hotels range from suburban and airport properties such as those in Greater Vancouver; Edmonton, Alberta; Calgary, Alberta; Seattle, Washington, and Burbank, California to resort-designated properties such as: The Coast Osoyoos Beach Hotel in Osoyoos, British Columbia; the Hillcrest Hotel, a Coast Resort in Revelstoke, British Columbia; and the Coast Capri Hotel, in Kelowna, British Columbia.

It has corporate offices in Vancouver and Seattle. It also manages two hotels that do not carry the Coast Hotels brand; The Campus Tower Suite Hotel at the University of Alberta, and Tekarra Lodge in Jasper, Alberta.

== Property locations ==
- British Columbia: 19
- Alberta: 9
- Saskatchewan: 2
- Yukon: 3
- Alaska: 1
- California: 3
- Washington: 4
- Hawaii: 1
