= United States House of Representatives House Resolution 121 =

United States resolution condemning Japan's comfort women

- Long title: A resolution expressing the sense of the House of Representatives that the Government of Japan should formally acknowledge, apologize, and accept historical responsibility in a clear and unequivocal manner for its Imperial Armed Forces' coercion of young women into sexual slavery, known to the world as "comfort women", during its colonial and wartime occupation of Asia and the Pacific Islands from the 1930s through the duration of World War II
- Enacted by: the 110th United States Congress
- Effective: July 30, 2007

Legislative history
- Introduced in the House as H.Res.121 by Mike Honda on January 31, 2007; Committee consideration by House Committee on Foreign Affairs; Passed the House on July 30, 2007 (voice vote)

United States House of Representatives House Resolution 121 (H.Res. 121) is a resolution about comfort women which Japanese-American Congressman Mike Honda of California's 15th congressional district introduced to the American House of Representatives in 2007. It asks that the Japanese government apologize to former comfort women and include curriculum about them in Japanese schools, citing the 1921 International Convention for the Suppression of the Traffic in Women and Children - that Japan has ratified - and United Nations Security Council Resolution 1325. This resolution was passed on July 30, 2007.

== Controversy ==
Seiji Yoshida's memoirs were used as an evidence for the roundup of over 1,000 women in Korea in a Congressional Report which was prepared for this resolution. Marshall Wordsworth discussed the controversy over Seiji Yoshida's testimony in his 2018 book Inconvenient and Uncomfortable: Transcending Japan's Comfort Women Paradigm.

An early detailed revelation came from Yoshida Seiji, a former Japanese military policeman, who wrote a book in 1983 entitled My War Crimes: The Forced Draft of Koreans in which he described his participation in the roundup of over 1,000 women in Korea for service as "comfort women" to the Japanese military.

== Washington Post advertisements ==
On June 14, 2007, a group of conservative Japanese politicians, academics, and others ran an advertisement in The Washington Post critical of the resolution. The ad was in response to a previous advertisement by a group of Korean comfort women survivors that ran in The Washington Post in support of the resolution, titled The Truth about Comfort Women.

== See also ==
- Kono Statement
