= Vopak =

Dutch chemical company

Koninklijke Vopak N.V.
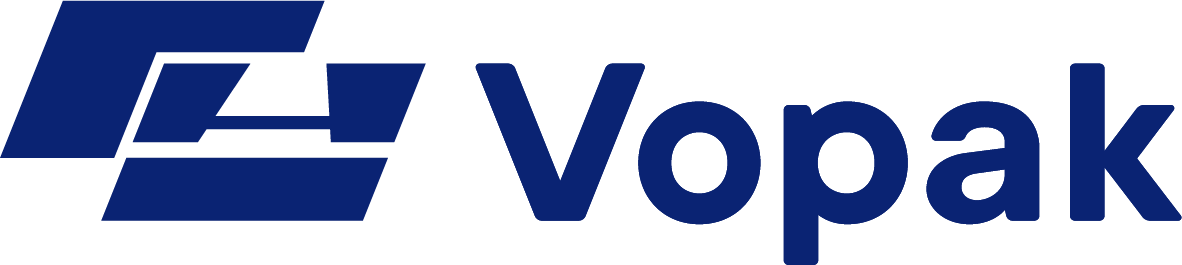
- Type: Naamloze Vennootschap
- Traded as: Euronext: VPK
- Industry: Industrial infrastructure company
- Founded: 1999; 27 years ago
- Headquarters: Rotterdam, Netherlands
- Key people: Dick Richelle (CEO), Frits Eulderink (COO), Michiel Gilsing (CFO)
- Products: Industrial infrastructure for the storage and handling of chemicals, gases, LNG, oil, vegoils, ammonia, hydrogen
- Website: www.vopak.com

Royal Vopak N.V. (Dutch: Koninklijke Vopak) is a Dutch independent multinational company that stores and handles products ranging from chemicals, oil, gases and LNG to biofuels and vegoils.

Its purpose is to "Store vital products with care", which derives from the products Vopak stores and how they are being stored The company was created by the merger of Van Ommeren and Pakhoed in 1999.

In 2002, the distribution of oil and natural gas related products was split off; a new company Univar was created for that purpose. The head office is located in Rotterdam.

Vopak is listed on Euronext Amsterdam.

== Merger ==
In 1998 the companies Royal Pakhoed nv and Royal van Ommeren nv decided to merge. Both companies were offering storage services for oil, petrochemical products, vegetable oils etc. Both companies were also active on the market of shipping (tankers) and other logistical services.

Besides their overlapping activities Van Ommeren offered heavy-goods transport via Dockwise and Pakhoed offered distribution services for chemical products via the company Univar.

The European Commission ruled that the merger would give the combined company too much market power in storage services in the Antwerp-Rotterdam-Amsterdam (ARA)-area, on which made the offer to sell parts of their storage-tank capacity. The EC ruled this as insufficient and the merger was canceled.

Renewed negotiations resulted in the combination selling the Pakhoed terminals in Pernis and Botlek as well as van Ommeren selling their stake in Gamatext in the Port of Antwerp. This new offer convinced the EC to approve the merger and in 1999 it was publicly announced

On 15 April 2000 Vopak announced that they sold their 1,5 million m^{3} Botlek terminal to Norwegian competitor Odfjell. Odfjell had already terminals in Houston, China and South America. The entire workforce of 260 people also moved to Odfjell. Earlier that year Vopak had already sold its stake in the Gamatex terminal in Antwerp to the American partner GATX.

Early in 2002 the CEO Ton Spoor left with immediate effect, officially because of 'personal reasons', but it was rumoured that the break of trust between him and the company was caused by the €150 million write-off in 2001 caused by a failed attempt to introduce a pan-European IT system. Spoor was succeeded by Gary Pruitt.

The new combined company Vopak has a difficult start: there is only very limited synergy to be found in the storage services and the chemical distribution services and the company lacks the funds to realize her growth strategy. Because of that Vopak decides to split off and then sell the distribution services as Univar.

== Activities ==
Vopak has a global network of terminals. The terminal services Vopak offers can be grouped into five strategic terminal types:

1. New energy & feedstocks
2. Gas terminals
3. Industrial terminals
4. Chemical terminals
5. Oil terminals

Vopak is currently active in Europe, South Africa, the Middle-East, Africa, South-East Asia, North Asia, China, North-America, South America, and Australia.

The company is a member of the Fuels Industry Association of South Africa (FIASA).

=== Key indicators ===
Below an overview of the key figures over 2016-2020. The numbers include income from joint-ventures

Description	2016	2017	2018	2019	2020
Number of terminals	67	66	68	66	70
Number of countries	25	25	25	23	23
Storage capacity (in million cbm)	34.7	35.9	37.0	34.0	35.6
Market capitalization (in EUR billions)	5.7	4.7	5.1	6.2	5.4
Number of employees (in FTE)	5,672	5,730	5,733	5,559	5,637
Total Injury Rate (In 200,000 hours worked by own personnel and contractors)	0.29	0.38	0.30	0.34	0.37
EBITDA (in EUR millions - excluding exceptional items)	822	763	734	830	792
ROCE (excluding exceptional items)	13.6%	12.0%	11.6%	12.4%	11.6%

=== LNG - terminals ===
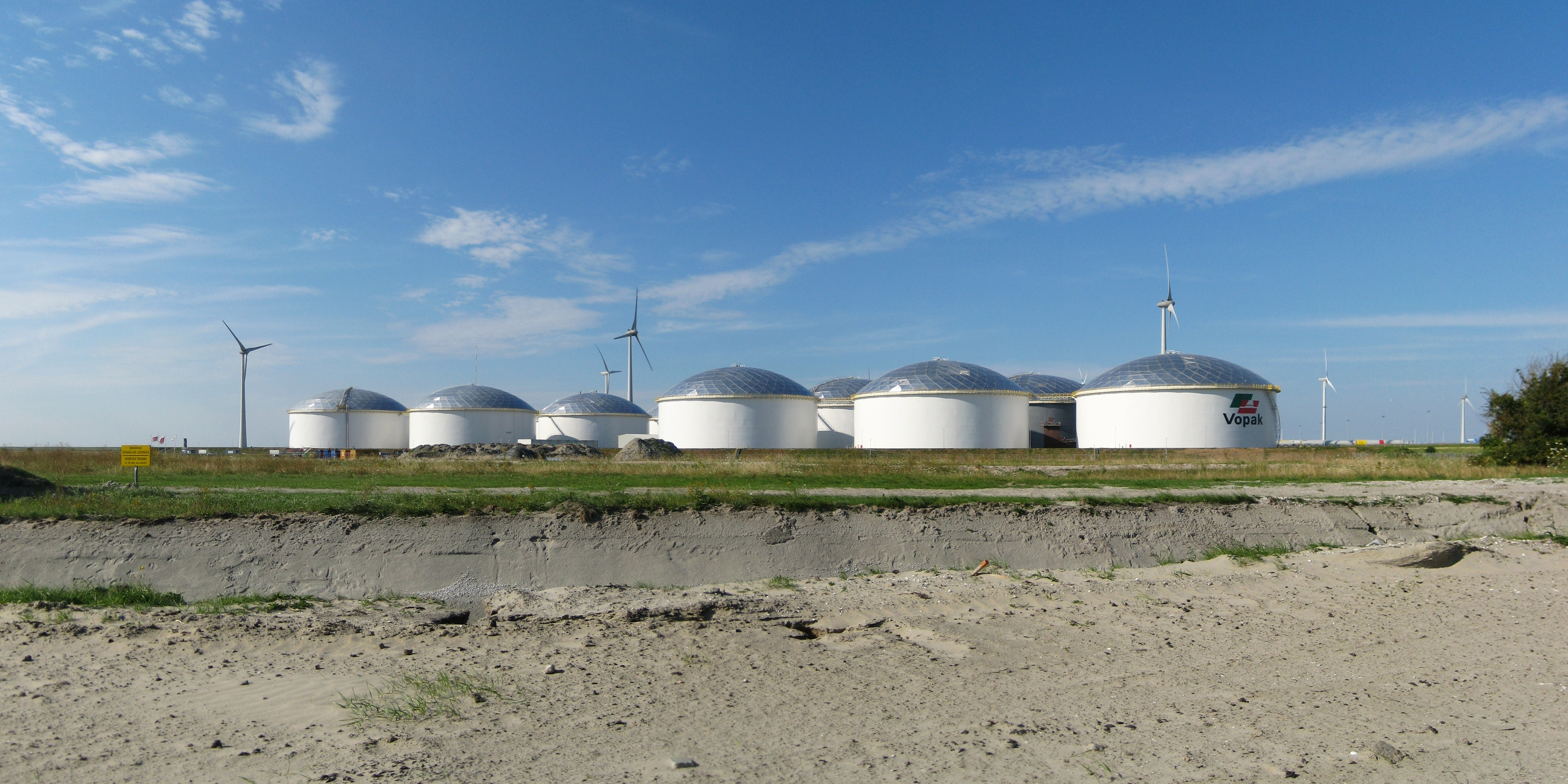
De Vopak Terminal Eemshaven storage for diesel and gasoline, (LNG plans canceled in 2012)

Together with Dutch company N.V. Nederlandse Gasunie Vopak is building the first LNG terminal in Rotterdam. Building commenced in 2008 and on 23 September 2011 the terminal was opened by the Queen and since then it is in full production.

The LNG terminal consists of 3 tanks with a combined storage capacity of 540.000 m^{3} liquefied gas, equivalent to a throughput of 12 billion m^{3} gas per year. The total investment was approx. 800 million Euro. The joint-venture has several multi-year contracts with energy producers like E.ON and Essent, since 2009 owned by German RWE. Gasunie and Vopak own 80% of the terminal and both customers each 5%.

There were also plans to develop a LNG terminal in the Eemshaven in the North of the country. Vopak and Gasunie would own each 25% and Essent 50%, but in 2012 it became clear that the project was not viable and the plans were scrapped.

== Investments and Divestments ==
July 2019; Vopak signed investment agreement with strategic partners for Hydrogenious LOHC Technologies

September 2019; Vopak bought a 49% stake in Colombia's LNG import facility, in Cartagena.

October 2019; Vopak sold its Amsterdam and Hamburg terminals to First State Investments.

November 2019; Vopak announced its selection by Gulf Coast Growth Ventures (GCGV) to design, build, own, and operate new industrial terminal in Corpus Christi, on the U.S. Gulf Coast.

December 2019; Vopak completed its divestment of the joint venture Yangpu oil terminal in Hainan, China.

January 2020; Vopak completed its divestment of oil terminal in Algeciras to First State Investments.

December 2020; Vopak and BlackRock's Global Energy & Power Infrastructure Fund (GEPIF) successfully acquired three industrial terminals from DOW on the U.S. Gulf Coast.

February 2021; Vopak announced its investment in storage capacity for waste based feedstocks at the Port of Rotterdam for the production of biofuels.
