= Stockholm Industry Water Award =

Water industry award

- Description: Business and industry contributions to global water sustainability
- Country: Sweden
- Presented by: Stockholm International Water Institute (SIWI)

The Stockholm Industry Water Award recognises impressive contributions made by businesses and industries to improve the world water situation. The honorary prize has been awarded annually since its inception in 2000 with an aim to encourage and reward improved business performance, production and innovation to reduce industrial water consumption and pollution. The award is presented at the World Water Week in Stockholm each August. The prize was established by the Stockholm Water Foundation in collaboration with the Royal Swedish Academy of Engineering Sciences and the World Business Council for Sustainable Development. It is administrated by the Stockholm International Water Institute.

== Past laureates ==
2015: CH2M, USA

For its "transformative technologies and strategic communication."

2014: eThekwini Water & Sanitation, South Africa

For its "open approach to experimenting and piloting new solutions across both technical and social aspects of service delivery [which] has made eThekwini a forerunner in the world of utility-run services"

2013 Netafim, Israel

For its "remarkable achievements, helping farmers across the world to 'grow more with less,' which directly contribute to a more water- and food-secure world."

2012 PepsiCo, India

For "its efforts to increase water efficiency, conserving nearly 16 billion litres of water in 2011 from a 2006 baseline, demonstrating that responsible water use makes good business sense."

2011 Nestlé, Switzerland

For "its unwavering commitment, establishing itself as a leader in smart water management, and providing an example for other food producers and distributors to follow."

2010 Phnom Penh Water Supply Authority, Cambodia

For "its world class performance in water supply and self-sufficiency" (see also Water supply in Phnom Penh).

2009 Trojan Technologies, Canada

For their contribution to a viable industry in the area of ultraviolet technologies which has advanced regulatory acceptance, overcome limitations of existing technologies, and provided a means of protecting public health and developing new sources of water supply.

2008 Orange County Water District and Orange County Sanitation District, USA

Development of the world's largest groundwater recharge purification plant by the Orange County Water District and Orange County Sanitation District.

2007 Public Utilities Board, Singapore

For "their holistic approach to water resources management which made water use sustainable for different sectors of society in a unique and challenging urban island environment."

2006 Sydney Water, Australia

For their "Every Drop Counts (EDC) Business Program" which demonstrates how the utility is working in partnership with business, industry and government to help ensure the long-term sustainability of Sydney’s water supply.

2005 Procter & Gamble, USA

In recognition of the development of the PUR brand drinking water treatment system for households.

2004 Staple Fibre Division of Grasim Industries, India

For showing that a market leading manufacturer based in a developing country can significantly reduce its water usage, improve its overall environmental impact and be profitable.

2003 ZENON Environmental, Canada

For developing the ZeeWeed membrane technology, used in the treatment of drinking water supplies.

2002 Kaldnes Miljöteknologi, Norway

For the development of the Moving Bed Process, a biological treatment method which makes wastewater treatment more efficient.

2001 The General Motors de Mexico Ramos Arizpe Complex, Mexico

For proving that more products can be manufactured with less water, and that corporate environmental sustainability can go hand-in-hand with the financial bottom line.

2000 Northumbrian Water, England

For their forward looking initiative at achieving a regional solution to sewage treatment and disposal, in co-operation with local government and regulatory agencies, businesses and other non-governmental organisations.

== See also ==
- List of environmental awards
