= ZENON Environmental =

ZENON Environmental was a Canadian water treatment company based in Oakville, Ontario. Founded in 1980, it specialised in manufacturing ultrafiltration membranes and provided engineering support for its worldwide plants.

On March 14, 2006, GE Water & Process Technologies, a unit of GE agreed to acquire ZENON Environmental for the amount of $24 CAD / share. This deal was successfully completed in early June 2006.

In 2003, ZENON Environmental was presented with the Stockholm Industry Water Award.

The ZeeWeed hollow fiber filtration membrane is used globally in water and wastewater applications and is manufactured in Hungary and China. Suez Water Technologies & Solutions has many offices around the globe, including the former Zenon Environmental office in Oakville, Ontario, which employees 700 people.

In October 2017, GE Water and Process Technologies was acquired by Suez and is now Suez Water Technologies.
