= Kia Canada =

Canadian subsidiary of Kia Corporation

Kia Canada Inc.
- Type: Subsidiary
- Industry: Automotive
- Founded: 1999; 27 years ago
- Headquarters: Mississauga, Ontario
- Parent: Kia Corporation
- Website: www.kia.ca

Kia Canada is a company formed in 1999 as a subsidiary of Kia Motors Corporation serving the Canadian market. It is headquartered in Mississauga, Ontario, where it employs approximately 180 people. Kia Canada is best known for its mid-market lineup of sport utility vehicles and crossovers, which are midway in size between SUVs and ordinary sedans, and increasingly for its electric vehicles and plug-in hybrids. In 2021, Kia Canada introduced a new logo and slogan, "Movement that inspires". As of 2021, Kia Canada sold nearly 80,000 vehicles a year.

== Lineup ==
In 2004, Kia Canada introduced a redesigned version of its light off-road Sportage as a crossover. Larger and more comfortable than its predecessor, the new Sportage gained a reputation for reliability and became one of Kia Canada's longest-running nameplates.

In 2008, Kia Canada introduced the Kia Soul, a small crossover with boxy styling which was imitated by rivals including the Toyota C-HR and Nissan Kicks. Memorable advertisements featured a dancing hamster, solidifying allegiance among younger drivers.

In 2016, the Telluride, a three-row luxury SUV, was introduced as a concept car. In 2019, Kia Canada launched the consumer version of the Telluride, with demand far exceeding availability. The Telluride's production model proved popular and won more awards than any other SUV in Kia Canada's lineup.

In 2022, Kia Canada introduced the EV6, an all-electric crossover, to the Canadian market. Driving's David Booth questioned Kia Canada's claims that the EV6's 77.4-kilowatt-hour lithium ion battery outperformed that of Hyundai's Ioniq 5, even though Hyundai claims to use the same battery, built by SK International. Nevertheless, Booth praised the EV6's 441 km range vs. the Ioniq 5's 414 km, achieved through more efficient power consumption of 19.9 kWh per 100 km.

Kia Canada's base model of the EV6 is strategically priced at just under $45k to qualify for Canada's federal Zero Emissions Vehicles rebate, with several provinces adding their own rebates. The 2023 high performance EV6 GT, starting at just under $75,000, is too expensive to qualify for federal or provincial rebates.

In 2020, Kia Canada announced its "Plan S" strategy, committing to provide Canadian consumers with a choice of seven all-new plug-in hybrids and all-electric vehicles by 2025.

== Sales history ==
In December 2019, Kia Canada sold its millionth vehicle, a Kia Soul purchased in Sherbrooke, Quebec. To celebrate the occasion, Kia Canada provided the vehicle along with $2,000 worth of options to its purchaser, a single mother and special education teacher named Sonia Blais, for free. Kia Sherbrooke's co-owner Tommy Morissette commented, "She moved us with the work she's been doing for the past 22 years with learning disabilities kids. She said she never won anything in her whole life, but now she's driving one of our vehicles - her second Kia - we're going to take very good care of her, and her Soul."

By the close of 2021, Kia Canada had surpassed previous records, selling 79,198 vehicles in a year which was otherwise challenging for the industry, with June 2021 as its best sales month in the company's history at 8,850 vehicles delivered including 779 certified pre-owned vehicles. Top-sellers included the Seltos and Sportage as well as the compact Forte. Sales of all-electric vehicles and plug-in hybrids rose to 4,720. According to US-based Auto Forecast Solutions, Kia Canada sold 43,598 vehicles in the first eight months of 2022, a 24.7% drop from 2021 as auto dealers struggled with low inventories and semiconductor shortages which left them unable to meet consumer demand. Torque News' Justin Hart lamented the long wait time for Kia Canada's EVs in particular.

== Kia Communities in Motion ==
In 2021, Kia Canada, in partnership with Community Foundations of Canada, launched Kia Communities in Motion, a program to donate $1.4 million to support local charities.
