= Univar Solutions =

American materials company

Univar Solutions Inc.
- Formerly: Royal Vopak; Van Waters & Rogers; Univar
- Company type: Private company
- Traded as: NYSE: UNVR
- Industry: Chemicals and Ingredients Distribution
- Genre: Chemical and Ingredient distribution company
- Founded: 1924; 102 years ago, in Seattle, Washington, U.S.
- Founders: George Van Waters; Nat S. Rogers
- Headquarters: Downers Grove, Illinois, U.S.
- Number of locations: Global
- Area served: Global
- Key people: Christopher Pappas; (Chairman); David Jukes; (President and CEO)
- Products: Chemicals and Ingredients
- Services: Distribution
- Revenue: US$8.265 billion (2020)
- Operating income: ▲282.2M (2020); 187.3 (2019)
- Net income: ▲52.9 (2020); US (100.2) (loss) (2019)
- Owner: Apollo Global Management (2023–present)
- Number of employees: 9,746 (December 2022)
- Website: univarsolutions.com

Univar Solutions Inc. (formerly Royal Vopak) is a global chemical and ingredients distributor and provider of value-added services.

Founded in 1924 as Van Waters & Rogers, it was acquired in August 2023 by funds controlled by Apollo Global Management. The transaction also included Abu Dhabi Investment Authority, which became a minority partner by investing in the company.

== History ==

On August 8, 1924, George Van Waters and Nat Rogers opened a small firm in Seattle, Washington, USA, buying and selling naval supplies, paint, raw materials and cotton linters.

When Van Waters & Rogers entered the laundry supply business, it paved the way for the company’s future in chemicals. Near the end of the 1920s, the company moved into a 5,000-square-foot (460 m^{2}) facility just south of downtown Seattle and, soon after, it expanded into the entire facility and plant next door.

In 1936, Van Waters & Rogers’ sales topped $1 million, and by the end of the decade the company was closing on the $2 million mark. Locations were added in Portland, Oregon, Spokane, Washington and Los Angeles, California. A notable addition was the industrial chemicals division headed by Glen McElvain, a chemical salesman who was instrumental in the acquisition of local chemical companies. In the 1940s, sales increased from $2 million in 1940 to more than $18 million in 1949. Acquisitions led to market entries in San Francisco and Texas and the first two women were appointed to officer positions.

In 1949, Van Waters & Rogers celebrated its 25th anniversary.

Univar acquired Industrial Materials Ltd. of Vancouver, British Columbia, and Braun-Knecht-Heimann of San Francisco in 1950. In 1956, Van Waters & Rogers made its first public stock offering. By the end of the decade, Van Waters & Rogers had locations in all 11 western states, Texas and Western Canada. Sales climbed from $18 million to more than $80 million in 1959.

In the 1960s, company headquarters relocated to San Francisco for a brief period. By mid-decade, shareholders approved the merger of Van Waters & Rogers and United Pacific Corporation. In 1966, Van Waters & Rogers became VWR United and the decade ended with the company's listing on the New York Stock Exchange on March 6, 1969.

At the March 25, 1970 board meeting, co-founder Nat Rogers retired from the company and later that same year, Jim Wiborg became CEO. As leadership changed, so did the company’s name. The name "Univar" was adopted in 1974 and the company continued to expand through acquisitions with the stated goal of becoming a national distributor. The most important acquisition was the purchase of McArthur Chemical, which established Univar as a major distributor throughout Canada.

Univar logo (2007-2019)

In the 1980s, Univar became North America's largest chemical distributor and sales topped $1 billion. Responding to new government regulations and environmental concerns, the company focused on product stewardship and introduced ChemCare, a waste management service. Univar acquired McKesson Chemical with financial backing from Royal Pakhoed and, combined, the two distribution giants formed a coast-to-coast network of more than 100 locations in the United States and Canada.

Acquisitions led to further expansion as Univar acquired four chemical distribution companies in Europe, forming Univar Europe. In 1996, Royal Pakhoed acquired Univar, and it merged with Royal Van Ommeren in 1999 to become Royal Vopak.

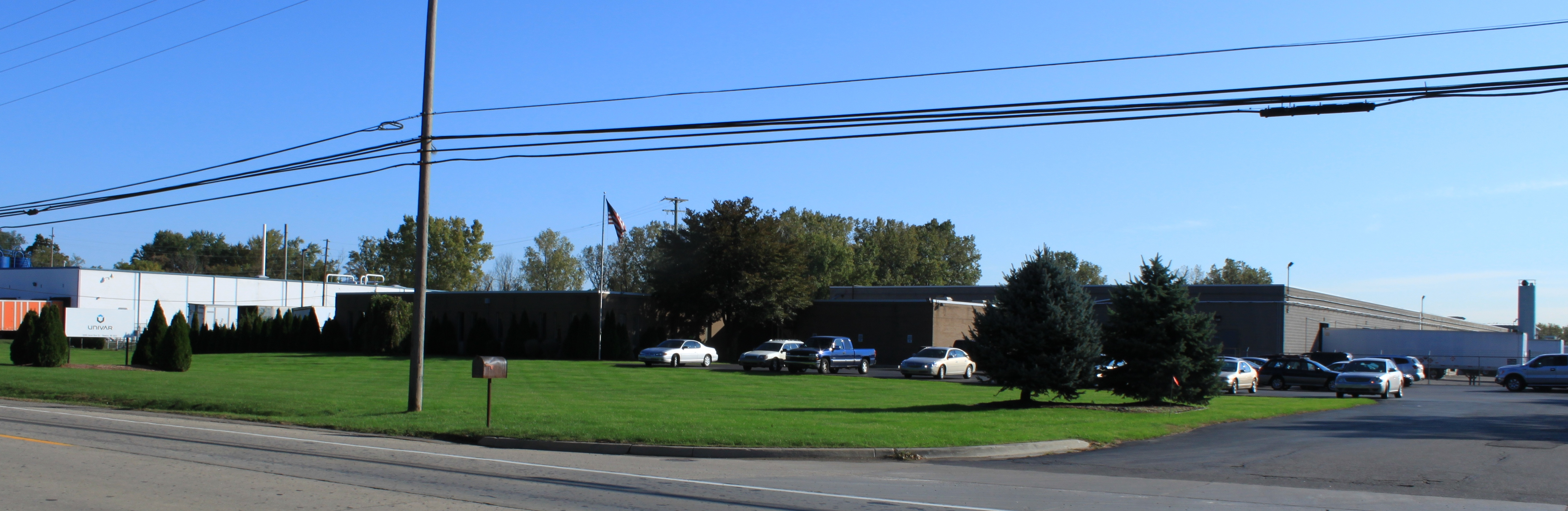
Detroit-Romulus distribution facility, Romulus, MI

Univar focused on industries that were population-based, such as food, pharmaceuticals, personal care, coatings and energy. Univar hired specialists, scientists and PhDs to assist customers with product formulations and technical solutions. Growth continued through the acquisition of Ellis & Everard, which included operations in the UK, Ireland and North America.

In 2002, Univar split off from Royal Vopak as an independent company and world leader in chemical distribution. In 2007, Univar purchased a leading competitor, CHEMCENTRAL and became a privately held company, owned primarily by funds managed or advised by London-based CVC Capital Partners. Univar ended the decade with $1.2 billion in net sales from the distribution of approximately 2.7 billion metric tons of chemicals in 2009.

In 2010, Clayton, Dubilier & Rice, LLC acquired a 42.5% ownership interest in Univar and the company continued to grow. It acquired US-based Basic Chemical Solutions, a global distributor and trader of commodity chemicals, and the Quaron distribution business in Belgium and the Netherlands, in 2010 and 2011, respectively.

In 2013, Univar moved its corporate headquarters from Redmond to Downers Grove, Illinois, a suburb of Chicago. In June 2014, Univar filed for a $100 million initial public offering.

In June 2016, it was announced that Univar had joined the Fortune 500 for the first time. It employed nearly 9,000 employees worldwide and generated net sales of $8.3 billion in 2017.

Univar completed the acquisition of Nexeo Solutions in March 2019. Nexeo Solutions had been a long-time competing chemical distributor and former division of Ashland, Inc until it was spun off in 2011. Following completion of the acquisition, Univar rebranded itself as Univar Solutions on March 1, 2019. In December of the same year, Univar sold its North American Environmental Sciences division to AEA Investors.

In November 2022, the world's largest chemical distributor, Brenntag, announced its intention to acquire Univar. Following criticism from some Brenntag shareholders, the acquisition plans were abandoned in early January 2023.

In March 2023, Univar agreed to be taken private by Apollo Global Management for a total enterprise value of $8.1 billion, with the deal including a minority investment from the Abu Dhabi Investment Authority. The acquisition was completed in August 2023. Prior to the acquisition, Univar Solutions acquired leading Turkish speciality chemicals distributor Kale Kimya and Leprino Foods selected Univar as an authorised distributor of food ingredients and dairy products. On a reported basis for 2022, the company reported revenue of $11.5 billion (up 20 per cent from FY 2021) and net profit of $545.3 million (up 18 per cent from FY 2021).

The company was ranked 61st among "The Best Companies for Future Leaders" by Time magazine and Statista, which analyzed the CVs of 2,000 prominent scientists, politicians and CEOs to identify where they most often worked.

In 2025, it sold its facilities in Tonawanda for $10.84 million to Fortress Investment Group. Univar continued to occupy the properties through a sale-leaseback agreement. It had headquarters in Illinois. Other properties are in Georgia and Florida.

In 2025, Univar Solutions USA settled for $1.1 million after a class action suit concerning allegations that Univar had mismanaged its $978 million retirement plan between 2016 and 2024.

== Controversies ==
On April 9, 2019, Univar USA Inc. agreed to pay $62.5 million to settle allegations of the US Department of Justice. According to the investigations, the company evaded antidumping duties on 36 shipments of Chinese saccharin between 2007 and 2012.

== See also ==
- Univar Canada
