= Univar Canada =

Canadian subsidiary of Univar Solutions Inc

Univar Solutions Canada Ltd.
- Type: Public, UNVR NYSE
- Industry: Chemical distribution
- Founded: 1950
- Founder: George Van Waters and Nat S. Rogers
- Headquarters: Richmond, BC, Canada
- Parent: Univar Inc.
- Website: UnivarSolutions.com

Univar Solutions Canada is the Canadian subsidiary of Univar Solutions Inc. and one of the largest industrial chemical distributors in Canada. The company operates seventeen main warehouses across Canada.

Univar Solutions Canada is a distributor for many of the world's top chemical manufacturers in a wide variety of industries, including chemical manufacturing, food and beverage, mining, oil and gas production, water treatment, and pharmaceutical.

Univar Solutions is a member of Responsible Distribution Canada.
