= OLCO Petroleum Group =

OLCO Petroleum Group Inc.
- Type: Private
- Industry: Oil and petroleum
- Founded: 1986; 40 years ago
- Headquarters: Montréal-Est, Quebec, Canada
- Products: Fuels, Lubricants, Petrochemicals
- Owner: Morgan Stanley (60%)

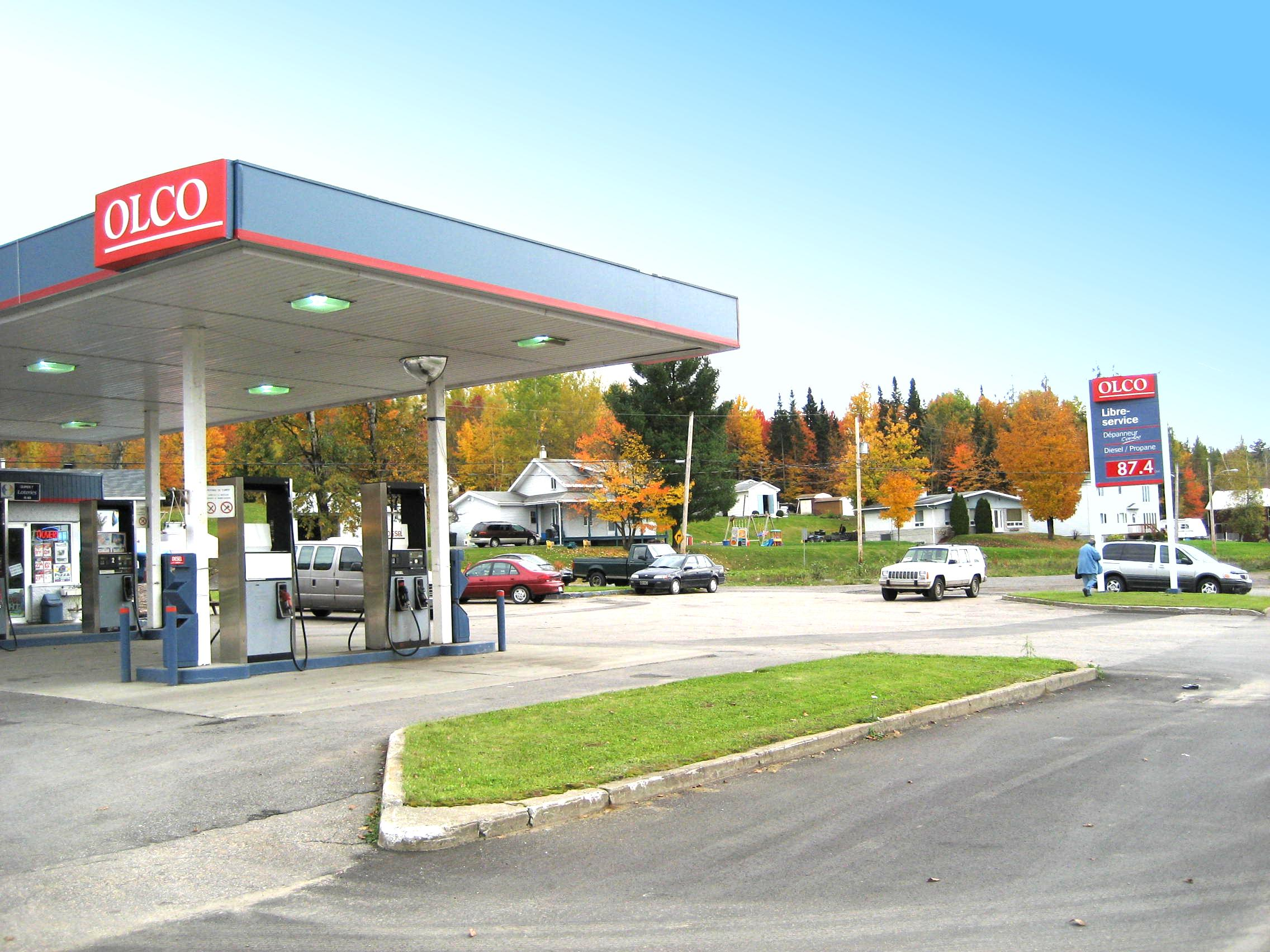
Olco station in Stoneham, Quebec

OLCO Petroleum Group, Inc. is a marketer and distributor of refined oil products in Canada. It operates gas station franchises in the provinces of Ontario and Quebec. It was founded in 1986, and has its headquarters in Montreal-Est, Quebec. The chain had 319 franchised stations: 182 in Quebec, and 137 in Ontario.

The company also offers terminal to wharf connections, dock storage, heating of products, inter-refinery pipelines, ship servicing and handling, bulk storage, tank leasing, product testing, top or bottom loading, rail connection to national networks, loading and unloading of rail cars, warehousing of dry products, product handling, customized and personalized billing, and product blending and injection systems; facilities to receive, transship, store, and deliver products; access by vessel, tank wagons, railcars, and pipeline at Montreal and inter-refineries pipelines; and railcar, truck, and tank linkage.

In 2005, approximately 84% of the class A shares in the capital stock of OLCO were beneficially owned by Mayfred Canada Ltd. In February 2007, 60 per cent of the company was purchased by Morgan Stanley, a U.S. investment bank.

As of 2022, many OLCO stations have been converted into other brands, leaving few that are still around.
