= Cambodia Securities Exchange =

National stock exchange of Cambodia

Coordinates: 11°34′19.3″N 104°55′6.9″E

- ក្រុមហ៊ុនផ្សារមូលបត្រកម្ពុជា
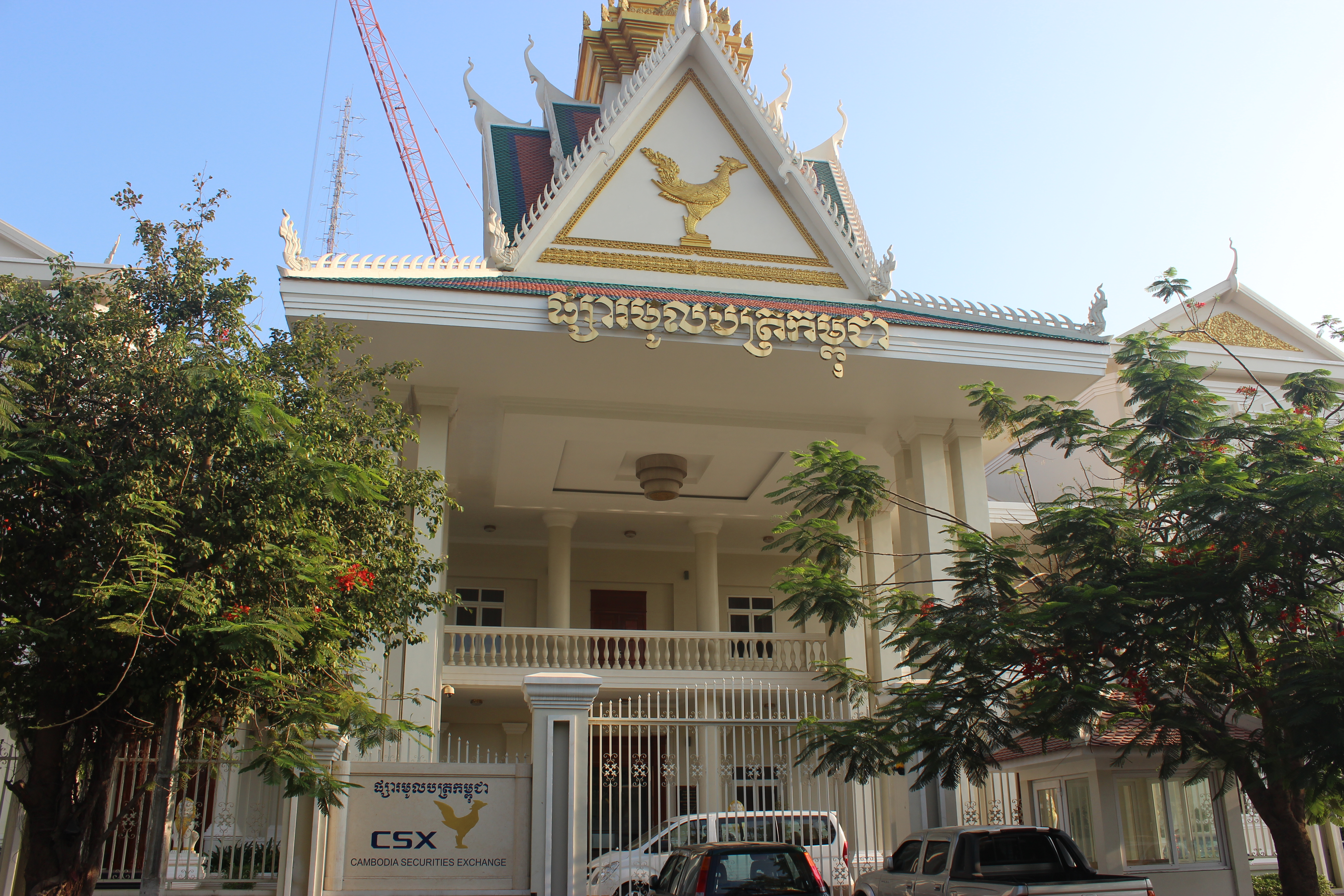
- Type: Stock exchange
- Location: Phnom Penh, Cambodia
- Founded: 11 July 2011; 15 years ago
- Key people: Hean Sahib (BoD Chairman), Hong Sok Huor (CEO)
- Currency: Cambodian riel
- No. of listings: 11
- Market cap: US$2.76 bilion
- Indices: CSX Index
- Website: http://www.csx.com.kh

The Cambodia Securities Exchange (CSX; Khmer: ក្រុមហ៊ុនផ្សារមូលបត្រកម្ពុជា, abbreviation: ផមក) is the national stock exchange of Cambodia. The exchange's purpose is to achieve high economic growth by facilitating flows of capital, investment, and reallocation of capital based on capital market mechanisms. The exchange is headquartered in the Canadia Tower, in Cambodia's capital city, Phnom Penh.

It maintains a stock market index, the CSX Index, with a starting value of 1000 points on 18 April 2012.

== History ==
In November 2006, the Cambodian Ministry of Economy and Finance (MEF) and Korea Exchange (KRX) signed a Memorandum of Understanding to develop the securities market in Cambodia. The following November, Cambodian Prime Minister, Samdech Hun Sen hosted an international conference promoting the launch of the Cambodia Securities Market project.

In March 2009, the Royal Government of Cambodia and Korea Exchange signed a "Joint-Venture Agreement" to establish a stock market ("The Cambodia Securities Exchange Co., Ltd"). The Cambodia Securities Exchange was then incorporated on 23 February 2010. The MEF owns 55% of the registered capital and KRX the remaining 45%.

== Listings ==
On 18 April 2012, Phnom Penh Water Supply Authority became the first domestically listed company on the Cambodian Securities Exchange. Its shares went up 48 percent on the first day of trading after investors sought more than 10 times the available stock. The second stock listed currently (February 2015) is Grand Twins International, a Taiwanese garment maker, which first trading day was on 16 June 2014. As of 2019, there are 5 stocks listed, namely Phnom Penh Water Supply Authority, Grand Twin International Plc., Phnom Penh Autonomous Port, Phnom Penh Special Economic Zone, and Sihanukvile Autonomous Port. CSX has also received 2 corporate bonds listings from Hatha Kaksekar Limited in 2018 and LOLC Cambodia Plc in 2019.

== CSX historical highlights ==
- 18 April 2012 – Phnom Penh Water Supply Authority became the first domestically listed company on the Cambodian Securities Exchange.
- 11 July 2011 – CSX was inaugurated by Deputy Prime Minister Keat Chhon, Minister of Economy and Finance.
- 28 February 2011 – CSX received approval from SECC to operate as Market Operator, Clearing and Settlement Facility, and Depository Operator.
- 23 February 2010 – Business Registration as a public enterprise with majority government shareholding.
- 23 March 2009 – "Joint Venture Agreement" between Royal Government of Cambodia represented by Ministry of Economy and Finance and Korea Exchange.
- 21 January 2008 – MOU on "The establishment of a Cambodia Securities Exchange in the Kingdom of Cambodia" was signed by MEF and KRX.
- 6 September 2007 – International Conference on the Launch of the Cambodia Securities Market Project.
- 20 November 2006 – MOU on "The development of the Securities Market in Cambodia" was signed by MEF and KRX.

== CSX leadership ==
- Dr. HEAN Sahib (ហ៊ាន សាហ៊ីប), Chairman of the Board of Directors
- Mr. HONG Sok Hour (ហុង សុហួរ), CEO
- Mr. HA Jong Weon, COO

== CSX organization ==
CSX is composed of the following departments:

1. Administration and Finance Department
2. IT Department
3. Listing and Disclosure Department
4. Market Operations Department
5. Clearing and Settlement Department
6. Depository Department

== Listed companies ==
The following companies are listed on the Cambodia Securities Exchange:

| Ticker | Company | Sector |
|---|---|---|
| PWSA | Phnom Penh Water Supply | Energy & Utilities |
| GTI | Grand Twins International | Garment Manufacturing |
| PPAP | Phnom Penh Autonomous Ports | Commerce |
| PPSP | Phnom Penh SEZ PLC | Commerce |
| PAS | Sihanoukville Autonomous Port | Commerce |
| ABC | ACLEDA Bank | Bank |
| PEPC | Pestech (Cambodia) Plc. | Power |

The following companies are proposed to be listed:

- PESTECH Cambodia Limited
- Acleda Bank

== Member institutions licensed for underwriting ==
The following brokerage firms hold membership to the CSX and are authorized to perform securities underwriting

| No. | Company |
|---|---|
| 1 | Acleda Securities Plc. |
| 2 | Cab Securities Limited |
| 3 | Cambodia - Vietnam Securities Plc. |
| 4 | Campu Securities Plc. |
| 5 | Cana Securities Ltd |
| 6 | Golden Fortune (Cambodia) Securities Plc. |
| 7 | Phnom Penh Securities Plc. |
| 8 | RHB Indochina Securities Plc. |
| 9 | SBI Royal Securities Plc. |
| 10 | Yuanta Securities (Cambodia) Plc. |

== Trading, settlement and depository ==
- Trading

Trading day shall be from Monday to Friday, except public holidays. Trading hours starts from 8:00 AM to 11:30 AM. Trading is executed through single-price auction from 8:00 AM to 9:00 AM and from 11:00 AM to 11:30 AM. Continuous multiple-price auction is executed from 9:00 AM to 11:00 AM, with opening at 9:00 AM and closing at 11:30 AM.

- Settlement

Settlements between members and CSX are carried out through 3 participating banks: ACLEDA Bank, Canadia Bank, BIDC.

- Depository

All securities listed and traded on the CSX are deposited with the CSX.

Detailed trading and settlement process and related mechanisms can be found at, http://www.csx.com.kh/operation/market/listPosts.do?MNCD=3010.

== See also ==
- List of ASEAN stock exchanges by market capitalization
- Economy of Cambodia
- List of stock exchanges
