= APA Group (Japan) =

Japanese hotel operator

- APA Head Office in Akasaka
- Native name: アパグループ
- Type: Kabushiki gaisha
- Industry: Hospitality
- Founded: April 1, 1988; 38 years ago
- Headquarters: Akasaka, Minato-ku, Tokyo, Japan
- Key people: Toshio Motoya (Board Chairman); Fumiko Motoya, Kazushi Motoya (CEO)
- Brands: APA Hotels
- Website: www3.apahotel.com

APA Group (アパグループ, Apa Gurūpu), commonly known as APA (Always Pleasant Amenities), is a Japanese hospitality group that operates a chain of hotels in the country.

APA has been noted in Japan for its proximity to the far right, particularly visible through the works considered revisionist and antisemitic that can be found in the company's hotel rooms, and the links of its founder with far-right figures such as Steve Bannon.

== History ==
Established on November 30, 1980. On December 12, 1984, the first hotel, "Kanazawa First Hotel" (now APA Hotel <Kanazawa Katamachi>), opened in Kanazawa, Japan. Subsequently, under the name "Shinkai Hotel", it continued opening locations in Ishikawa and Toyama Prefectures. On April 1, 1994, Fumiko Motoya became President of Shinkai Hotel. She actively appeared in advertisements and variety shows, always dressed formally with a hat, using the catchphrase "I am the president". She is considered the company's advertising icon. Signs featuring Fumiko Motoya's face were displayed at over 300 locations nationwide.

On July 7, 1997, the newly constructed "Shinkai Hotel <Tokyo Itabashi>" opened, marking the company's expansion into the Kanto region. Properties along JR lines, such as those near Itabashi Station and Ogaki Station, were acquired by purchasing land previously held by Japanese National Railway Settlement Corporation.

In 2005, the company acquired the land and buildings of the Makuhari Prince Hotel from Seibu Railway for ¥13.2 billion, opening the APA Hotel & Resort <Tokyo Bay Makuhari>. Until the 2000s, expansion into Tokyo's 23 wards was limited to a few locations, primarily through acquisitions of existing business hotels, excluding areas like Itabashi and Akasaka. However, following the Global Financial Crisis, the company accelerated land acquisition for new construction using business profits and bank loans as capital. Since 2010, under the dominant strategy dubbed "SUMIT-5," it has continued opening new "New Urban APA Hotels" prioritizing efficiency, primarily in central Tokyo and government-designated cities. From September 2011 onward, it also pursued franchising through partnerships and acquisitions with locally capitalized hotel operators, reaching its 39th location by May 2016.

APA expanded into the United States on November 13, 2015, with the APA Hotel Woodbridge (formerly a Hilton) in Iselin, New Jersey. APA acquired the Vancouver-based Coast Hotels in 2016 and became a hotel chain with 40 hotels and 5,028 rooms in North America. There are plans to open more hotels in the U.S. in the future.

APA Hotels are present in 45 prefectures within Japan, excluding Shimane and Kochi. Capital-alliance hotels exist throughout Japan, including Shimane and Kochi. Plans are underway to rebrand the capital-alliance partner Kōchi Palace Hotel and enter the Kōchi market in March 2026. APA operates over 134,847 guest rooms, ranking first in Japan's hotel industry as of 2025 (second place is Toyoko Inn).

== Controversy ==
APA Group distributes political propaganda written by its former president, Toshio Motoya, a strong supporter of revisionist historical views aligned with those of Japan's far-right. For example, in a series of interviews published online from APA Group's magazine Apple Town, Motoya referred to Japanese aggression, the Nanjing Massacre, and the sex slavery of comfort women as "fabricated stories created to dishonor Japan". He claimed that having spoken to many important figures in the 81 countries he has visited and to many ambassadors to Japan that "not a single person believes in things such as the Nanking Massacre or comfort women story". Such views are known to create negative feelings in neighboring countries such as China and South Korea. These publications are widely distributed in APA Hotels. In addition, Motoya disclosed in his books that he planned to give maximum support to the Abe administration to rebuke China and Korea on these historical issues. Some Chinese tourist organizations are boycotting the chain.

The Chinese foreign ministry spokeswoman Hua Chunying stated that the China National Tourism Administration has requested to all Chinese companies and websites to not conduct business with APA, and for people to not go to their hotels, she said "China is willing to have friendly interactions with Japan, but will never tolerate flagrant provocations distorting history and offending the Chinese people."

== Safety issues ==
In 2007, several APA hotels were discovered to have faked their earthquake safety data with some buildings having only 70 percent of the legally required structural strength. This greatly reduced construction costs but put customers at risk as Japan is among the world's most earthquake prone countries.
