= Foreign Investment Review Agency =

The Foreign Investment Review Agency (FIRA) was established by the Canadian Parliament in 1973 to ensure that the foreign acquisition and establishment of businesses in Canada was beneficial to the country. The Foreign Investment Review Act that created the agency was the culmination of a series of government reports and debates. The 1957 report of the Royal Commission on Canada's Economic Prospects (known as the Gordon Commission) firmly planted foreign investment on the political agenda. Next, the 1968 Watkins report (known formally as Foreign Ownership and the Structure of Canadian Industry), called for a national policy capable of handling Canada's interests in the age of the multinational corporation.

In 1970, the Wahn Report expanded the idea of a screening process, and finally the Gray report (known officially as Foreign Direct Investment in Canada) provided the rationale and framework for the agency. FIRA was placed under the jurisdiction of the Department of Industry and later, when it was merged with the Department of Trade and Commerce, under the newly named Department of Industry, Trade and Commerce. As outlined in section 2(2) of the act, takeovers were assessed based on their contribution to job creation, Canadian participation in management, competition with existing industries, new technology, and compatibility with federal and provincial economic policies.

When Prime Minister Brian Mulroney came to office in 1985, the agency was renamed Investment Canada and its mandate drastically reduced.
