= Toshio Motoya =

Japanese businessman and essayist (1943–2026)

Toshio Motoya (元谷 外志雄, Motoya Toshio; 3 June 1943 – 11 February 2026) was a Japanese far-right essayist, publisher and real estate businessman. He was the president of APA Group, which includes APA Hotels & Resorts, one of Japan's largest hotel chains.

Motoya was a supporter of revisionist historical views aligned with those of Japan's far right.

== Business interests ==
Motoya founded the APA Group real estate business in Ishikawa Prefecture in 1971. Its hotel division operates more than 70 properties across Japan. Motoya's wife Fumiko is president of the hotel chain and is widely recognized in Japan, with her image appearing on billboards displayed prominently near major train stations around the country.

At least four of the company's hotels in 2007 were temporarily shut down after it was discovered they failed to meet Japan's stringent earthquake safety standards, and that an architectural firm had used flawed data in its safety assessment of the buildings' designs.

== Political involvement ==
A vigorous supporter of Liberal Democratic Party Prime Minister Shinzō Abe and fierce critic of former Democratic Party of Japan Prime Minister Naoto Kan, Motoya is linked to right-wing political causes in Japan, and views the country's involvement in World War II in a generally positive light.

Motoya published a magazine called Apple Town, portions of which are translated into English, which is distributed through the APA Group's network of properties and which focuses on economic and foreign policy issues. In the magazine, Motoya, under the pen-name Seiji Fuji, has written essays urging increases in Japan's defense budget and suggesting that Japan's movement against nuclear power generation, which gathered momentum following the Fukushima nuclear accident, is part of a plot by the United States.

He also expressed his political views through the website distribution of Apple Town magazine.

Motoya had close ties to former Japan Air Self-Defense Force chief Toshio Tamogami, who was forced to resign amid controversy after an essay he wrote defending Japan's involvement in World War II came to public attention in 2008. Tamogami's essay, which argued Japan was forcibly drawn into World War II by Chiang Kai-shek and Franklin D. Roosevelt, had been written as part of an essay competition Motoya organized and sponsored under the theme "True Interpretation of Modern History". Motoya was also the head of the judging panel which awarded Tamogami the competition's ¥3 million first prize. After the revelation of Tamogami's involvement in the essay competition caused a political and media storm in Japan, Motoya defended the competition, saying it was motivated to have "proper historical views pave the way for Japan" to reinvent itself as a "true independent state". Further cause of political controversy was the revelation that 98 of the competition's 235 entrants were members of Japan's armed forces, including Tamogami and 77 other officers in Japan's air force. A book published by Motoya, The Shocking Truth About Modern History, containing 13 essays selected from the competition field, including Tamogami's winning entry, went on sale in late 2008 at bookstores and APA hotels.

== Views ==
=== Denialist statements of Japanese wartime atrocities ===
In an interview series named "Big Talk", Motoya expressed his view that "Japanese aggression, the Nanjing Massacre, and comfort women" were "fabricated stories" or "fictitious". Under the pen-name Seiji Fuji, Motoya also published a book named Theoretical Modern History: The Real History of Japan. In the book, Motoya reiterated his belief that the Nanjing Massacre and comfort women were falsehoods created by China and Korea. In addition, he discussed attracting millions of tourists from countries like China and Korea, and said he "will provide support to the maximum degree" to the Abe administration which can be used against China and Korea on these historical issues. Some Chinese tourist organizations are boycotting the chain.

=== Views on Jews ===
Motoya was the author of an essay titled: "Japan Should Use Jewish Marketing Companies to Correct Historical Falsehoods". He believed that "Jewish capital" is always in the background of "American wars, from the Vietnam War to the Iraq War", a view associated with economic antisemitism. According to him,

Jewish people control American information, finance, and laws, and they benefit greatly from globalization because they move their massive profits to tax havens so they don't have to pay any taxes.

In reaction to criticism, Motoya apologized and wrote in a following issue of APA magazine:

I always mean to praise the Jewish people as wise, with excellent skills in the fields of information, finance, and the law. But considering their history of struggle, I decided my statements had gone too far and removed them from the website.

Motoya died on 11 February 2026, at the age of 82.
