= List of companies of Cambodia =

Location of Cambodia

Cambodia is a country located in the southern portion of the Indochinese Peninsula in Southeast Asia. The country is reported by various organisations to have numerous sociopolitical issues including widespread poverty (according to the World Bank), pervasive corruption (according to Freedom House), lack of political freedoms (according to Transparency International), low human development (according to the Human Development Report) and a high rate of hunger. Cambodia has been described by Human Rights Watch's Southeast Asian Director, David Roberts, as a "vaguely communist free-market state with a relatively authoritarian coalition ruling over a superficial democracy." While per capita income remains low compared to most neighbouring countries, Cambodia has one of the fastest growing economies in Asia, with growth averaging 6 percent over the last decade. Agriculture remains the dominant economic sector, with strong growth in textiles, construction, garments and tourism leading to increased foreign investment and international trade. In the World Justice Project's 2015 Rule of Law Index, Cambodia was ranked 99 out of 102 countries, the lowest in the region.

For further information on the types of business entities in this country and their abbreviations, see Business entities in Cambodia.

== Notable firms ==
This list includes notable companies with primary headquarters located in the country. The industry and sector follow the Industry Classification Benchmark taxonomy. Organizations which have ceased operations are included and noted as defunct.

Notable companies Status: P=Private, S=State; A=Active, D=Defunct
Name	Industry	Sector	Headquarters	Founded	Notes	Status	
ABOUTAsia Travel	Consumer services	Travel & tourism	Siem Reap	2007	Destination management company, founded 2007	P	A
ACLEDA Bank	Financials	Banks	Phnom Penh	1993	Domestic commercial bank	P	A
Angkor Airways	Consumer services	Airlines	Phnom Penh	2004	Airline, defunct 2008	P	D
ANZ Royal Bank	Financials	Banks	Phnom Penh	2005	Private bank, part of ANZ (Australia)	P	A
Cambodia Airlines	Consumer services	Airlines	Phnom Penh	1997	Airline, defunct 2014	P	D
Cambodia Angkor Air	Consumer services	Airlines	Phnom Penh	2009	Flag carrier	S	A
Cambodia Asia Bank	Financials	Banks	Phnom Penh	1993	Bank	P	A
Cambodia Commercial Bank	Financials	Banks	Phnom Penh	1991	Commercial bank, part of Siam Commercial Bank (Thailand)	P	A
Cambodian National Insurance Company	Financials	Life insurance	Phnom Penh	1990	Private insurance	P	A
Cambrew Brewery	Consumer goods	Brewers	Sihanoukville	1965	Cambodia's largest beer manufacturer	P	A
CamGSM	Telecommunications	Mobile telecommunications	Phnom Penh	1996	Mobile telecommunications network	P	A
Camnet Internet Service	Telecommunications	Fixed line telecommunications	Phnom Penh	1997	Internet	S	A
Canadia Bank	Financials	Banks	Phnom Penh	1991	Bank, privatized in 1998	P	A
Canadia Group	Conglomerates	Diversified	Phnom Penh	1991	Property, financial services, aviation, education, healthcare, hospitality, agriculture	P	A
Comin Khmere	Industrials	Heavy construction	Siem Reap	1992	General contractor	P	A
Hattha Kaksekar	Financials	Banks	Phnom Penh	1994	Microfinance	P	A
IPR Microfinance Institution	Financials	Banks	Phnom Penh	2005	Domestic agricultural financing	P	A
Kampot Cement	Industrials	Building materials & fixtures	Phnom Penh	2005	Cement	P	A
Kampuchea Thmei Daily	Consumer services	Publishing	Phnom Penh	1995	Newspaper	P	A
Kingdom Breweries	Consumer goods	Brewers	Phnom Penh	2009	Craft brewery	P	A
Leopard Capital	Financials	Banks	Phnom Penh	2007	Lending	P	A
National Bank of Cambodia	Financials	Banks	Phnom Penh	1954	Central bank	S	A
Phnom Penh Commercial Bank	Financials	Banks	Phnom Penh	2008	Commercial bank	P	A
Phnom Penh Water Supply Authority (PPWSA)	Utilities	Water	Phnom Penh	1993		P	A
PMTair	Consumer services	Airlines	Phnom Penh	2003	Airline, defunct 2008	P	D
President Airlines	Consumer services	Airlines	Phnom Penh	1997	Airline, defunct 2007	P	D
Royal Khmer Airlines	Consumer services	Airlines	Phnom Penh	2000	Airline, defunct 2007	P	D
Royal Phnom Penh Airways	Consumer services	Airlines	Phnom Penh	1999	Airline, defunct 2004	P	D
Siem Reap Airways International	Consumer services	Airlines	Phnom Penh	2000	Airline, defunct 2008	P	D
Sky Angkor Airlines	Consumer services	Airlines	Siem Reap	2011	Airline	P	A
Sokimex	Conglomerates	-	Phnom Penh	1990	Petroleum import/export, hospitality. airlines	P	A
Telecom Cambodia	Telecommunications	Fixed line telecommunications	Phnom Penh	2006	Telecom	S	A
The Cambodia Daily	Consumer services	Publishing	Phnom Penh	1993	Newspaper	P	A
The Phnom Penh Post	Consumer services	Publishing	Phnom Penh	1992	Newspaper	P	A
The Royal Group	Conglomerates	-	Phnom Penh	1991	Telecommunications, media, financials, travel & leisure, agriculture	P	A
TonleSap Airlines	Consumer services	Airlines	Phnom Penh	2011	Regional carrier, defunct 2013	P	D
Vattanac Bank	Financials	Banks	Phnom Penh	2002	Retail and commercial bank	P	A

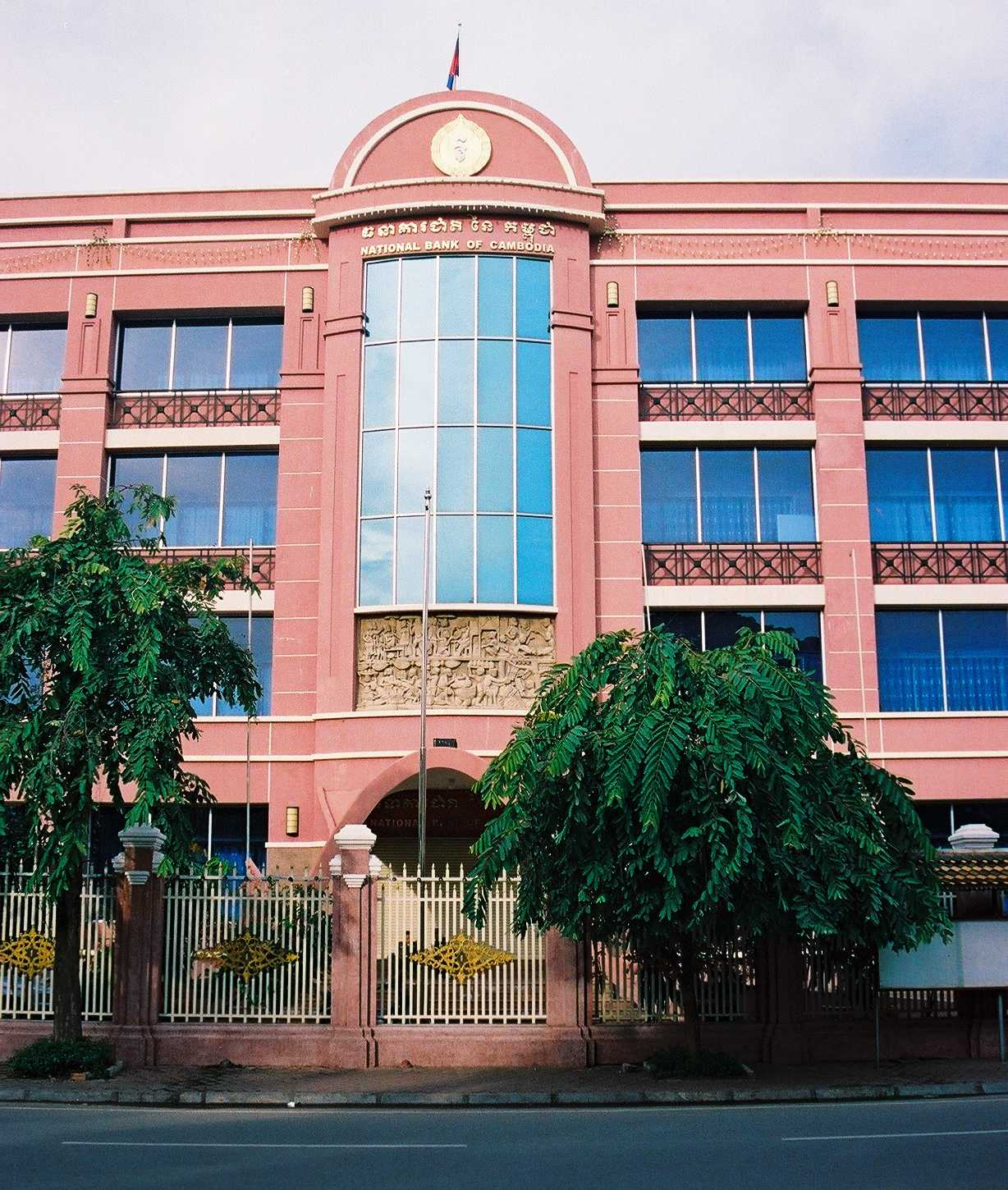
National Bank of Cambodia in Phnom Penh

Overseas Cambodian Investment Corp Tower in Phnom Penh

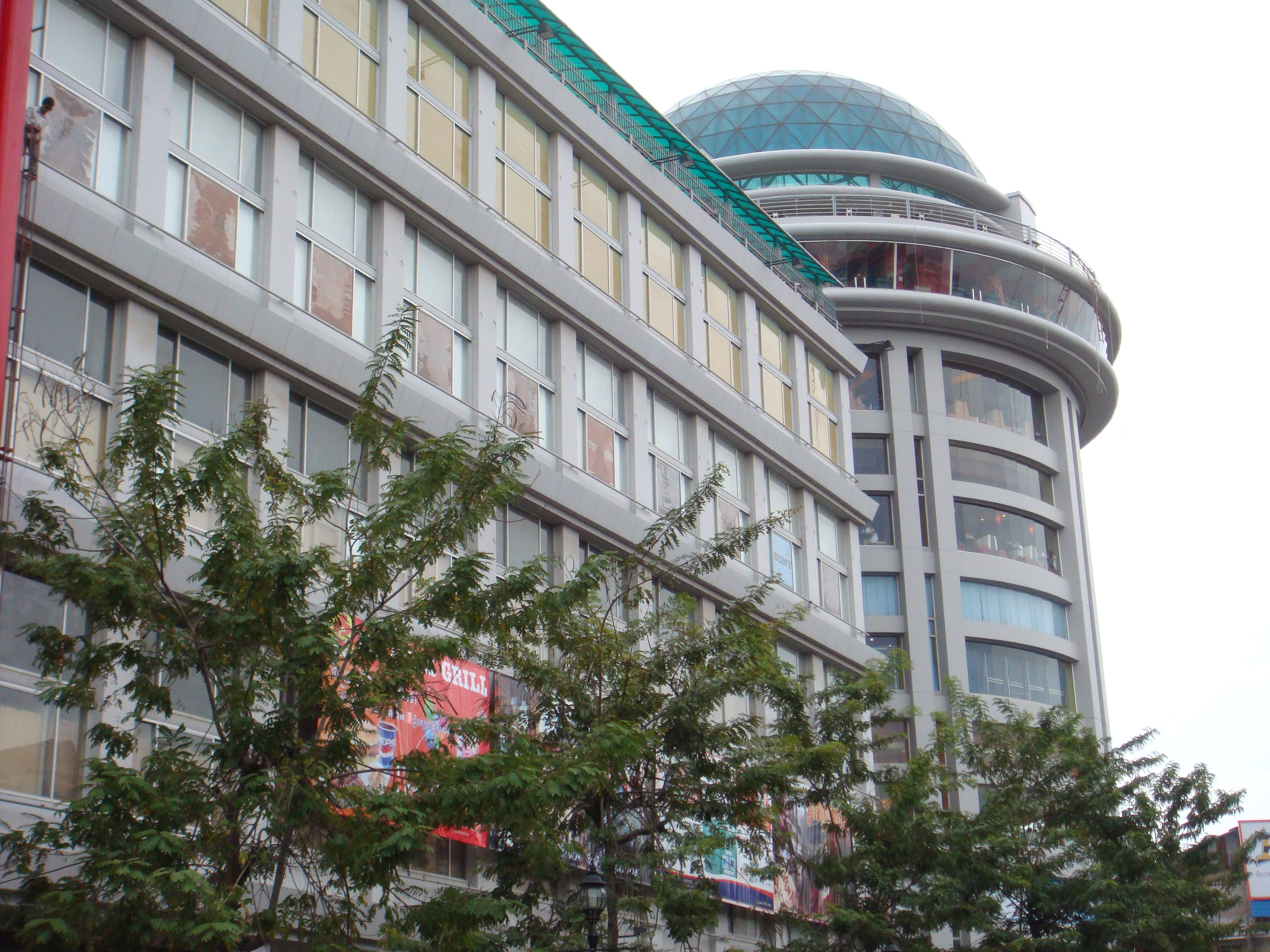
Sorya Shopping Center in Phnom Penh

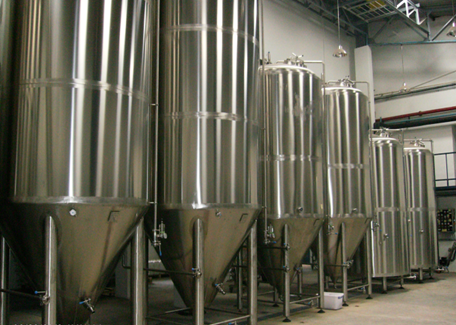
Tanks inside Kingdom Breweries

== See also ==
- List of airlines of Cambodia
