= Battle of Pailin =

Last battle of the Khmer Rouge

- Part of the Cambodian conflict (1979–1998)
- Cambodia Pailin locator map
Date	1989–1997
Location	Pailin 12°51′16″N 102°36′23″E
Result	Cambodian government victory; end of the Khmer Rouge insurgency

Belligerents
Cambodia	(Cambodia) Khmer Rouge: Supported by: Thailand

Commanders and leaders
(Cambodia) Ke Kim Yan	(Cambodia) Ieng Sary (POW)

Units involved
Royal Cambodian Armed Forces	320th and 412th divisions

Strength
7,000	3,000

The Battle of Pailin also known as the Siege of Pailin was an armed conflict which extended from 1989 to 1997 as the last military act of the Khmer Rouge insurgency which took place in the Northwest of Cambodia in the last military stronghold of the Khmer Rouge.

== Context ==
After the Khmer Rouge exterminated thousands of their own people during the Cambodian genocide, they were overthrown by the invasion of the Vietnamese Communists on Christmas Day, 1978. During ten years, the Khmer Rouge led a guerilla against the occupation army. While some Khmer Rouge found refuge in the Site 8 refugee camp on the Thai border, large regiments of insurgents lived in hiding in the large forests of the Northwest of Cambodia.

As their resistance went on, their resources became scarce. The nearby town of Pailin, which had been bombarded since 1979 chasing all its population presented itself as a strategic hotspot. More than its old sandstone and wooden houses, the city was famous for its ruby and sapphire fields, said to be some of the richest in the world.

The Khmer Rouge were not the only forces opposing the Vietnamese army; monarchist regiments under Prince Norodom Ranariddh and nationalist troops led by resistance leader Son Sann also attacked the Vietnamese forces.

As the Vietnamese retreated, the vacuum created an opportunity for the Khmer Rouge to seize the city and turn Pailin into their ultimate stronghold in the Northwest.

== Overview ==
=== The fall of Pailin ===
While the Vietnamese ended their 10-year occupation of Cambodia and retreated for the Northwest of Cambodia with their 26,000 soldiers, the Khmer Rouge launched their takeover of Pailin on September 17, 1989. While they shelled a deserted town, the new transitional government of the State of Cambodia organized a "hero's farewell for the Vietnamese troops on their way out of the country".

According to Khieu Kanharith, the Khmer Rouge guerillas committed two divisions to the Pailin campaign, the 320th and the 412th divisions. The government army led by General Ke Kim Yan was outnumbered with only one troop division, or about 6,000 men involved in the defense of Pailin. The departure of the Vietnamese had created high expectations but in the end it brought no denouement to the conflict. On October 24, 1989, the Khmer Rouge claimed victory over the city of Pailin capturing tanks and artillery in what was perceived as "a major victory for the Khmer Rouge in its 11-year battle to topple the Vietnamese-installed government of Cambodia."

From then until August 1996, the Khmer Rouge kept three main headquarters in Pailin, Anlong Veng and Phnom Malai.

=== The capture and loss of Pailin in 1993-1994 ===
==== The departure of the United Nations Transitional Authority in Cambodia ====
In May 1993, Khmer rouge guerrillas operating in Banteay Meanchey set an ambush that killed Haruyuki Takata, a Japanese policeman working for the United Nations Transitional Authority in Cambodia. His death accelerated the withdrawal of the Japanese contingent from high risk areas in Cambodia, and later, the total withdrawal of any military presence of the United Nations in Cambodia. Japanese administrator Yasushi Akashi and the UNTAC Force Commander Lieutenant General John Sanderson tried to reach Pailin in a final attempt to reach a truce. This proved unsuccessful as the blue helmets were forced to retreat, which was "a massive embarrassment for the United Nations" at the time.

In July 1993, General Ke Kim Yan reunited the various divided military factions of Cambodian guerrillas under his leadership thus creating the Royal Cambodian Armed Forces. While the army payroll was momentarily provided by the United Nations for only three months, the latter also received most of their arms and landmines from the United Nations' unused stocks.

The last UNTAC forces left the country on November 15, 1993.

==== Failed peace talks over a failed assault ====
While King Norodom Sihanouk and the royalists led by Norodom Ranariddh favoured negotiations with the Khmer Rouge in Pailin, the Cambodian People's Party considered a strong military intervention to be necessary. In May 1993, it was reported that Un Sun suspected the military officers close to the royalist FUNCINPEC were "undermining the recent efforts to capture the Khmer rouge base in Pailin".

The Khmer rouge used the Cambodian general election in 1993 as a diversion to launch an offensive with both diplomatic and military implications in order to show that "it must be allowed to share power in the new government if there were to be any peace".

On July 7, 1993, the archeological site of Preah Vihear fell into the hands of the Khmer Rouge. Galvanised by their success, the Khmer Rouge went onto detaining twenty-one peacekeepers on Thail territory after overrunning a checkpoint of Chong Aan Ma.

As government troops prepared to retaliate and take back Pailin around January 1994, the Khmer Rouge multiplied the assaults on local villages of the province of Battamband and Bavel in a campaign of intimidation. In August 1993, General Ke Kim Yan launched a national counter-attack against the Khmer Rouge, who had enjoyed a relative tranquility during the years of the UNTAC. The first battles took place in Banteay Meanchey and Kampong Thom provinces.

The government took control over strategic areas and was able to open a road from Preah Vihear to Siem Reap and chase the Khmer Rouge from their stronghold in Phnom Chat on August 20, 1993. As the conflict escalated, King Sihanouk attempted to return to peace talks with his former Khmer rouge allies. On November 22, 1993, he suggested that some Khmer Rouge leaders could be "included in the government, even at ministerial levels, if [they] were to acknowledge the government's legitimacy". Prince Ranariddh even had a meeting with Khmer rouge leader Khieu Samphan in Thailand on December 17, 1993. The peace talks were aborted on January 17, 1994, as the Khmer Rouge refused to demobilize.

==== Taking and losing Pailin ====
On February 2, 1994, General Ke Kim Yan launched the assault on Anlong Veng, and faced no resistance, as the Khmer rouge guerilla went into hiding once more in the tropical forest. The operation was bankrolled by powerful Khmer tycoons, namely Teng Bunma, Sok Kong and Kith Meng who received "lucrative states contracts and monopolies" as a reward for their support of the politics of the Cambodian People's Party.

High casualties resulted not from fighting but from mines and booby-traps set up by the Khmer rouge guerillas. However, the disorganized government troops went out of funding and food in were forced to retreat from Anlong Veng on February 24. The following month, the government troops tried to capture Pailin with worn out troops. The offensive was launched on March 17 with 7,000 troops, tanks, heavy artillery and armed helicopters. After two days of intense fighting, the city was taken over by the government but the victory did not last long, while it created another humanitarian crisis as the Thai army refused to let more refugees in.

As the civilians escaped, the Khmer Rouge came back offensively on the April 19 and took back the city without much pain, as the government soldiers were forced to escape through the minefields of Route 10 and the Khmer Rouge led by Ieng Sary advanced on Battambang, stopping around ten kilometers before the urban area. The burned land terror campaign led by the Khmer Rouge as they advanced resulted in another 60,000 civilians being displaced.

==== New attempts of peace talks in Pyongyang and Phnom Penh ====
By May 1994, the status ante quo had returned, and new peace talks were initiated by King Sihanouk who hosted a first round of negotiations with Khmer Rouge leaders at his private residence in the North Korean capital city of Pyongyang on May 17, 1994, before welcoming their representatives in Phnom Penh on June 16 but the parties failed to meet an agreement on a possible ceasefire. While the faction of Pailin was willing to talk, the die-hard Khmer Rouge in Anlong Veng led by Ta Mok were not ready to let go.

=== The final surrender of Pailin in 1997 ===
By 1997, the population of Pailin had grown wary of armed conflicts and aspired to normalization of the political situation which has been through unceasing episodes of war since the beginning of Cambodian Civil War. In October 1997, Ieng Sary made his first visit to Phnom Penh since the arrival of the Vietnamese in 1979 and met with Prime Minister Hun Sen. On November 8, 1997, an official ceremony was organized celebrating the normalization of the administrative status of Pailin as a municipality of Cambodia.

== Controversies ==
=== Thai support for the Khmer Rouge ===
Thailand has been accused of unofficially supporting the Khmer Rouge in Pailin, by allowing the illegal traffic of stones and gems through the Khmer-Thai border. At the same time, Thailand also closed its doors to the massive influx of war refugees everytime new episodes of violence erupted in Pailin, showing an ambivalent with the last remnants of the Khmer Rouge. The gems of Pailin have been considered as blood diamonds inasmuch as their traffic in Thailand prolonged the endless Cambodian Civil War.

=== Survival of the Khmer rouge ===
The battle of Pailin showed the world that after already ten years of guerilla fighting against the Vietnamese occupation, Pol Pot's men were still determined to remain "a force to be reckoned with and must be included in any negotiated solution of the conflict". It also revealed the weakness of the Khmer army once the Vietnamese artillery pulled out.

=== Omerta and amnesia ===
A 1995 report of Human Rights Watch made between March 1994 and February 1995 documented cases of "murder, rape, hostage-taking, and the use of famine as a weapon by the Khmer Rouge in their scorched earth tactics". The history of the genocide that occurred in the area is slowly being forgotten in a climate of omerta, partly because most of the population of Pailin being made of ex-Khmer Rouge who benefited from the politics of agrarian cooperativism in the countryside rather than terror and torture in Phnom Penh. This omerta was felt in Cambodia as the shadow of Pol Pot hovered over Khmer people until his death in 1998, which was seen as the actual end of the Khmer rouge, rather than the military defeat after the battle of Pailin.

== Aftermath ==
=== Wounds of war ===
Years after the end after the end of the armed conflict in Pailin, wounds of war remain visible in and around the city.

The battle of Pailin combined with the departure of the UNTAC flooded with Cambodian market with weapons of war such as automatic rifles and bazookas which were readily available at local markets, as in Toul Tompung Russian market, in the 1990s. General Ke Kim Yan led a campaign to collect some of this hazardous arsenal; three tons of crushed guns were melted into a national monument on the roundabout of the Chroy Changvar Bridge in Phnom Penh, and during the inauguration of that statue, Hun Sen himself symbolically surrendered his golden gun to General Ke Kim Yan.

The population of Pailin is still below the average in Cambodian economic standards and many NGOs continue to work for the support of the victims of war.

=== Mines, drugs and malaria ===
In the aftermath of the battle of Pailin, three main plagues appeared.

The first was the presence of mines in the area, which at one point was considered the most heavily mined zone in the world. In 1997, the International Campaign to Ban Landmines received the Nobel Peace Prize partly for their involvement in raising awareness of this situation in the area of Pailin and Northwest Cambodia. In 2015, the National Mine Awareness day was celebrated in Pailin.

The second was the traffic of drogues, which had already begun under the no-law regime of the Khmer rouge in the area. It only worsened in the 1990s.

Finally, because of poor access to healthcare in this tropical wet forest, added to mass migration to work in the camps, Pailin was the epicentre of malaria in Cambodia and in the whole area. Three variants of malaria appeared in the area of Pailin that were resistant to any form of treatment, before spreading to other areas, even all the way to Africa.

=== Economic recovery ===
While the city of Pailin had been devastated by decades of war, it has since the late 2000s gone through a "mini-economic boom". Tourism has slowly made its return to Pailin where the hills and nature provide limited attractions for tourists, while the interest was the Casino of Pailin.
