= Sok (surname) =

Sok (Khmer: សុខ) is a surname. Notable people with the surname include:

- Sok An (1950–2017), Cambodian academic and politician
- Sok Chanphal (born 1984), Cambodian songwriter
- Sok Chanraksmey (1992), former Cambodian footballer
- Ho Sok Fong (1970), Chinese Malaysian writer
- Jean Sok, French-born one-legged professional breakdancer
- Khin Sok (1942–2011), Cambodian historian, linguist, literature and arts scholar
- Sok Kong (1948), Khmer businessman and founder of Sokimex
- Sok Rithy (born 1990), former Cambodian footballer
- Sok Samnang (1995), Cambodian footballer
- Sok San, Cambodian politician
- Sok Siphana (1960), Cambodian lawyer
- Sok Sovan (1992), former Cambodian footballer
- Sok Sreymom, Cambodian film star
- Sok Touch, Cambodian intellectual
