= Ke Kim Yan =

Cambodian Deputy Prime Minister

Ke Kim Yan (Khmer: ឯកឧត្តម ឧបនាយករដ្ឋមន្រ្តី កែ គឹមយ៉ាន) is the former Commander-in-Chief of the Royal Armed Forces of Cambodia and currently one of the ten Deputy Prime Ministers of Cambodia. He is considered as a "highly professional officer with a realistic approach to the challenges before him".

== Biography ==
Ke Kim Yan had no Khmer Rouge background. He had originally distinguished himself in the People's Republic of Kampuchea military ranks as a commander fighting Pol Pot Khmer Rouge guerrillas in northwest Cambodia and had then become Secretary of the RPPK Committee and chairman of the provincial administration for Battambang province.

=== Losing the 1993 election ===
Along with Ung Sami and Hul Savorn, General Ke Kim Yan was among the original candidates of the Cambodian People's Party in the province of Battambang during the 1993 general election. The overwhelming victory of the royalist party FUNCINPEC in that province proved a "bitter political blow" to these powerful men.

After King Norodom Sihanouk proclaimed a post-election interim coalition government of FUNCINPEC and the CPP on June 3, 1993, Sihanouk remained Uppermost High Commander of a multi-partite Cambodian Armed Forces proclaimed on June 10 but Ke Kim Yan was named chief of the armed forces Supreme General Staff in replacement of Pol Saroeun, and with deputies including general officers from both FUNCINPEC, Nhek Bunchhay, and the CPP, represented by Pol Saroeun.

=== Restoring the unity of the Cambodian Royal Armed Forces ===
Ke Kim Yan was the head of the powerful General Political Department of the Cambodian People's Armed Forces before being named Chief of Staff of the Royal Cambodian Armed Forces. In the early 1990s, despite financial difficulties and lack of human resources, he was in charge of the difficult mission of uniting the various rebel military movements such as those led by Nhek Bun Chhay and reintegrate them into the Royal Cambodian Armed Forces. With written orders from Prince Norodom Ranariddh an Co-Prime Minister Hun Sen, General Ke Kim Yan sold 30,000m3 of allegedly already felled timber which had been 'confiscated' in Koh Kong, in order to raise money to fund the 1995-1996 dry season offensive on the last Khmer Rouge positions during the Battle of Pailin. In 1995, as Chief of Staff, General Ke Kim Yan had to demobilize part of the 130,000 strong army, as part of the reform process, while allegations emanated from the United Nations that he had engaged in forced conscriptions in order to find soldiers to fight on the Thai border. Meanwhile, he was sometimes considered dangerously “soft” on UNTAC and FUNCINPEC by the government of Cambodia, as he tried to walk on the narrow path between the UNTAC on one side and Cambodian politics on another.

In May 1997, General Ke Kim Yan led the Khmer delegation in the first meeting of the border peace-keeping Committee between Thailand and Cambodia.

=== Avoiding bloodshed during the coup of 1997 ===
Between unstable years from 1993 and 1997, General Ke Kim Yan had to face no less than four coup attempts. During the successful coup in July 1997, the military led by commander-in-chief, General Ke Kim Yan (CPP), and the CPP Minister of the Interior, Sar Kheng, refused the use of force despite direct orders from Hun Sen which were executed only by key military forces participating under the authority of Pol Saroeun, and with the help the private security and financial support of powerful tycoons such as Teng Bunma, Sok Kong and Mong Reththy. General Ke Kim Yan instructed all units of the armed forces that all units must stay at their base, and no troop movements were allowed without orders from the General Chief of Staff, avoiding even more bloodshed. After the coup, Prime Minister Hun Sen gave his gun made of solid gold to Chief of the Royal Cambodian Armed Forces, General Ke Kim Yan, now kept in the National Museum of the Military as a symbol of the massive surrender of weapons in order to return to peace in Cambodia after the coup.

=== Leading Cambodian military diplomacy ===
General Ke Kim Yan, Chief of General Staff, Ministry of Defence of Cambodia led a 3 - member delegation for participation in the Aero India 1998 at Bangalore from 6–14 December 1998.

After Hun Sen resigned as Commander-in-Chief of the Armed Forces in 1999, the Prime Minister elevated General Ke Kim Yan who was the former Chief of the General Staff, as the new Commander-in-Chief. In October 1999, Ke Kim Yan, Commander-in-Chief of the Royal Cambodian Armed Forces, led a senior military delegation to Beijing to discuss China's offer of military assistance, in what was the highest diplomatic visit to China since 1993 and the return of King Sihanouk from China, and has since then resulted in the generous military support of China for Cambodia.

=== Between crisis and promotion as Deputy Prime Minister ===
In 2005, Hun Sen publicly attacked General Ke Kim Yan, saying that the general would be fired if he disobeyed orders because the prime minister controlled the armed forces.

In January 2009, General Ke Kim Yan was removed from his post as Commander-in-Chief of the Royal Cambodian Armed Forces and was replaced by his deputy, General Pol Saroeun, the new Commander-in-Chief of the Royal Cambodian Armed Forces. While it was believed that this resulted from an internal dispute within the Cambodian People's Party and others accused Ke Kim Yan of being caught in shady land deals, the move was presented as an ordinary reshuffle within the military. It has been said that General Ke Kim Yan was promoted to the position of Deputy Prime Minister, not only because of his proximity with Chea Sim, but more specifically due to his widespread support in the military.

== Family ==
General Ke Kim Yan is related by marriage to Sar Kheng, who is also the brother-in-law of the belated Chea Sim.

== Legacy ==
=== Demining Cambodia ===
Chief of General Staff Ke Kim Yan is not only credited with defeating the remaining Khmer Rouge soldiers after the return of the monarch in Cambodia in 1993, he has also contributed significantly to the effort of demining Cambodia which kept mines as wounds since the Cambodian Civil War. It is reported that from 1993 to 2002, the engineering forces of the Cambodian army have liberated 4,288,913 ha from mines.

=== Reforming the Cambodian military ===
After uniting the various rebellious factions into one military force under the banner of the Royal Cambodian Armed Forces, General Ke Kim Yan has also strived to reform the military to international military standards; as such, the United Nations consider him as "the strongest backer for military reform [..] who wishes to transform the RCAF into a sufficiently professional force such that it could take part in future peacekeeping missions."
