= Thai Boon Roong Twin Tower World Trade Center =

Planned skyscraper in Phnom Penh, Cambodia

- Interactive map of the Thai Boon Roong Twin Tower World Trade Center area

General information
- Status: Proposed
- Type: Mixed-Use
- Location: Phnom Penh, Cambodia
- Coordinates: 11°33′27″N 104°56′12″E

Height
- Height: Twin towers: 567 m (1,860 ft)

Technical details
- Floor count: Twin towers: 133; Two commercial towers: 65; Two commercial towers: 59

Design and construction
- Architect: Tous Saphoeun
- Developer: Thai Boon Roong Group; Sun Kian Ip Group

Thai Boon Roong Twin Tower World Trade Center (Note: also known as "Thai Boon Roong Twin Trade Center" or "Thai Boon Roong Twin Towers") is a planned skyscraper complex in Phnom Penh, Cambodia, consisting of twin 133-storey skyscrapers with a height of 567 m (1,860 ft), surrounded by four commercial towers: two at 65 floors and two at 59 floors. The project is managed by the Cambodian company Thai Boon Roong Group, with the Macau-based Sun Kian Ip Group as co-developer. It is planned to be built on a 5 hectare property in the Doun Penh section, formerly occupied by the Dreamland amusement park, and was approved for construction in February 2016. In December of that year, the developers entered a $2.7 billion construction contract (pending funding which at the time was yet to be finalised) with Chinese firms Wuchang Shipbuilding Industry Group and Sino Great Wall International Engineering, who formed a joint venture for this purpose; at this time, the building's announced height was 560 m (1,840 ft).

Described since then as what would be Southeast Asia's tallest building, (Note: At the time of the project's unveiling, when the twin skyscraper's planned height was 500 m (1,600 ft), it was envisioned as the second-tallest building in Southeast Asia, behind the 555 m (1,821 ft) Diamond Tower project, which had been announced by the prime minister of Cambodia Hun Sen in 2010, but which has not entered construction as of 2023.) if built, the twin skyscrapers would be the second tallest buildings in the region—after Merdeka 118, which is nearing completion in 2023 and has a height of 678.9 m (2,227 ft). Upon completion, the Thai Boon Roong Twin Towers would surpass the Petronas Towers as the world's tallest twin skyscraper (as of 2023).

== Construction and halt ==
In mid-2017, 1 August 2017 was set as the date of the start of construction. Since then, construction has been delayed multiple times. A groundbreaking ceremony was held on the site in 2018, however, later that year, Sino Great Wall International Engineering withdrew from the project due to a failure to secure financing, and citing "greater uncontrollable risks."

In 2021, the Thai Boon Roong Group suggested that they were "waiting for the right time" and expected to restart construction after the COVID-19 pandemic subsided, and that the plan had not changed.

As of 2022, the project has been "failing to materialize", according to Southeast Asia Globe, and, as of 2023, the Council on Tall Buildings and Urban Habitat website lists the project's status as "proposed". In 2021 and 2022, the company has cited the economic impact of the COVID-19 pandemic and that of the Russian invasion of Ukraine as reasons for the delay, and reported that a retaining wall had been completed.

== See also ==
- Hotel Cambodiana, lying next to Thai Boon Roong Twin Trade Center construction site, and announced as the site of another Phnom Penh skyscraper
- List of tallest twin buildings and structures
- List of tallest buildings in Cambodia
- Naga 3, a similar on-hold complex in the same city, also of a 'twin tower with smaller surrounding skyscrapers' configuration.
