= ANZ Royal Bank =

Bank in Cambodia

- Type: Private
- Industry: Banking and Finance
- Founded: 2005; 21 years ago
- Headquarters: Phnom Penh, Cambodia
- Products: Financial services
- Website: www.anzroyal.com

ANZ Royal Bank is a bank in Cambodia with 23 branches that provides internet banking and a network of automated teller machines (ATM) at 101 locations both at branches and off-site. It also offers an "institutional team to assist multinational businesses operating in Cambodia". Established in 2005, ANZ Royal is a joint venture of J Trust and the Cambodian Royal Group Company (RGC).

== Ownership ==
ANZ Royal is a joint venture with the Cambodian Royal Group; the company is 55% J Trust owned and 45% owned by Royal Group.

== Competition ==
ANZ Royal's main competitors are ACLEDA Bank, Cambodia Asia Bank, Canadia Bank, Maybank Phnom Penh, Singapore Banking Corporation (SBC), Vattanac Bank.

== Controversy ==
=== Sugar plantation ===
In 2014, it was revealed that the ANZ Royal Bank had been financing a sugar plantation, Phnom Penh Sugar, which had been connected to child labour and forced evictions. The bank responded by saying that they would "continue to engage with this particular case" and would "review the way the company addresses its social and environmental obligations". Though the bank later stopped funding the plantation, farmers handed the bank a petition in August 2014 asking them to take responsibility and help repair the damage done by the plantation. Despite the petition and further protests, the bank declined to help the communities affected.
