= Chef Nak =

Cambodian celebrity chef, culinary author, and entrepreneur

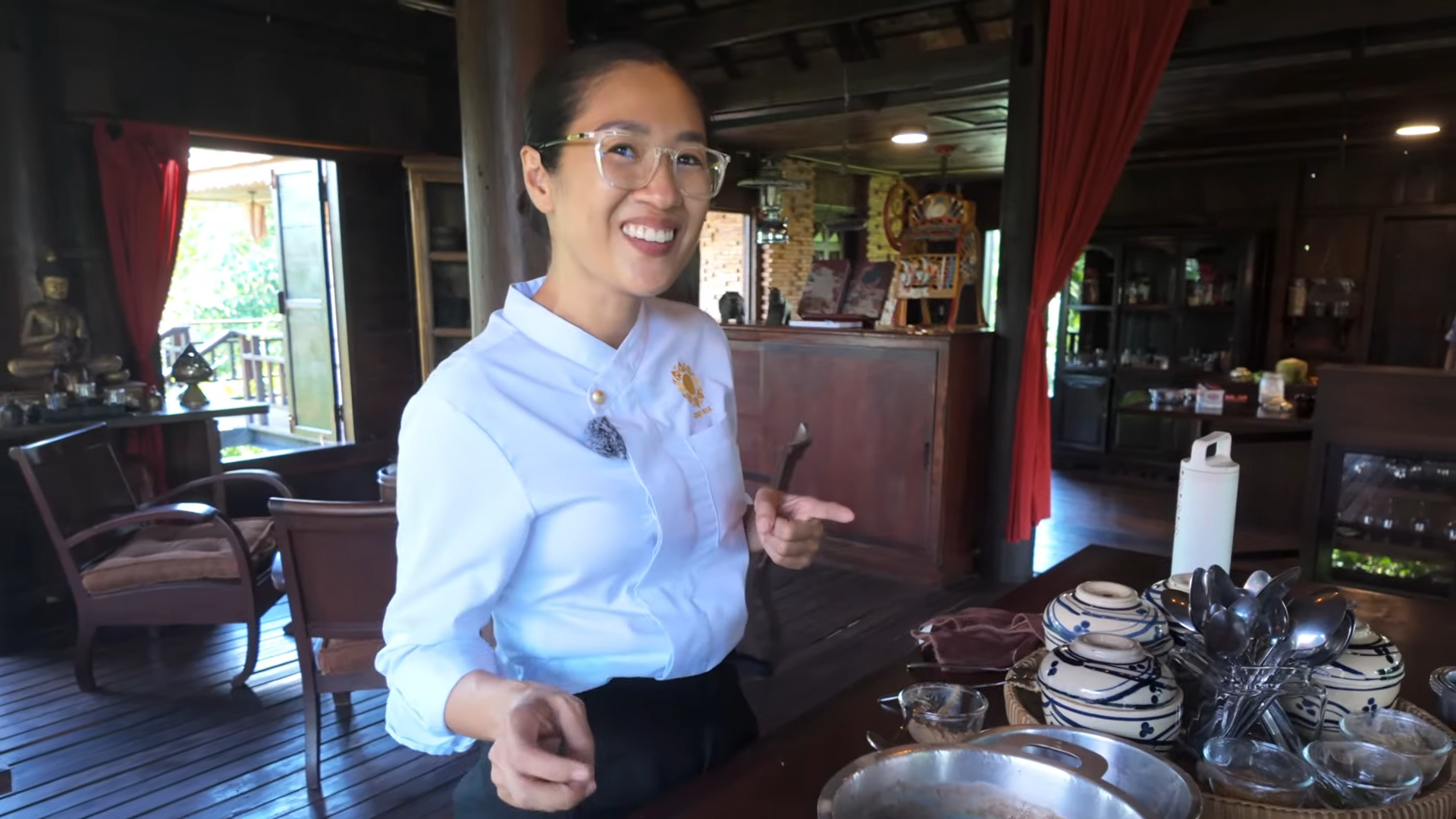
- Ros in 2024
- Born: Rotanak Ros; 24 May 1985 (age 41); Phnom Penh, Cambodia
- Other name: Rotanak Ros
- Occupations: Chef, author, and entrepreneur
- Years active: 2017–present
- Notable work: SAOY – Royal Cambodian Home Cuisine (2023); Nhum: Recipes from a Cambodian Kitchen (2019)
- Website: https://chefnak.com/

Rotanak Ros (Khmer: រស់ រតន; born on 24 May 1985 in Phnom Penh, Cambodia), known profesionally as Chef Nak (Khmer: ចុងភៅណាក់), is a Cambodian celebrity chef, culinary author, and entrepreneur.

== Biography ==
Rotanak began cooking at the age of five, when she and her elder sister helped care for their siblings while their parents were hospitalized following a traffic accident. As her parents later returned to work, the sisters continued to prepare meals for the family.

At the age of 19, Rotanak began working as a program coordinator for Cambodian Living Arts, becoming the organization's head of finance at the age of 22. Her work there introduced her to efforts to document and preserve Cambodian performing arts, which influenced her later interest in documenting Cambodian cuisine.

In October 2018, Rotanak began offering private cooking classes and home dining at her house in Phnom Penh. Her cooking classes accommodate groups of up to 60 people, while her home dining service operates for three days a week. In 2020, the South China Morning Post included her home dining experience in a list of emerging food-travel destinations in Asia.

In 2019, following a successful Kickstarter campaign, Rotanak released Nhum – Recipes from a Cambodian Kitchen, a collection of approximately 80 traditional Cambodian recipes from various parts of Cambodia, in both English and Khmer. In 2020, it received Gourmand World Cookbook Awards in the categories of "Woman Chef Book" and "Published in Asia".

Also in 2019, Rotanak collaborated with Brasserie Louis in Rosewood Phnom Penh to design a 12-dish menu. She later helped curate the Cambodian menu for the restaurant Khmer Kitchen in Bangalore, India.

In April 2021, The New York Times featured Rotanak as her cookbook was made available on Amazon. Later that year, Taste of Home included her among Asian chefs and food innovators featured for their contributions to food culture.

In 2022, Travel + Leisure included Chef Nak Home Dining in a list of dining experiences from around the world. Her cooking classes have also been included in a list of cookery schools in Asia published by Food and Travel Magazine.

On 12 May 2023, Rotanak published her second cookbook, SAOY – Royal Cambodian Home Cuisine, which focuses on Cambodian royal cuisine. The book was presented at Rosewood Phnom Penh Hotel on the day of its publication. It is based on Princess Norodom Rasmi Sobbhana's cookbook, a copy of which was given to Chef Nak by a daughter of a former U.S. ambassador in Cambodia. On 28 November 2023, SAOY – Royal Cambodian Home Cuisine received three Gourmand World Cookbook Awards, in the categories "Best of the Best", "Asian-Books", and "Heads of State".

In November 2023, Travel + Leisure included Rotanak among five female chefs in Asia for her work relating to Cambodian cuisine.
