= Kith Meng =

Cambodian businessman (born 1968)

Neak Oknha Kith Meng
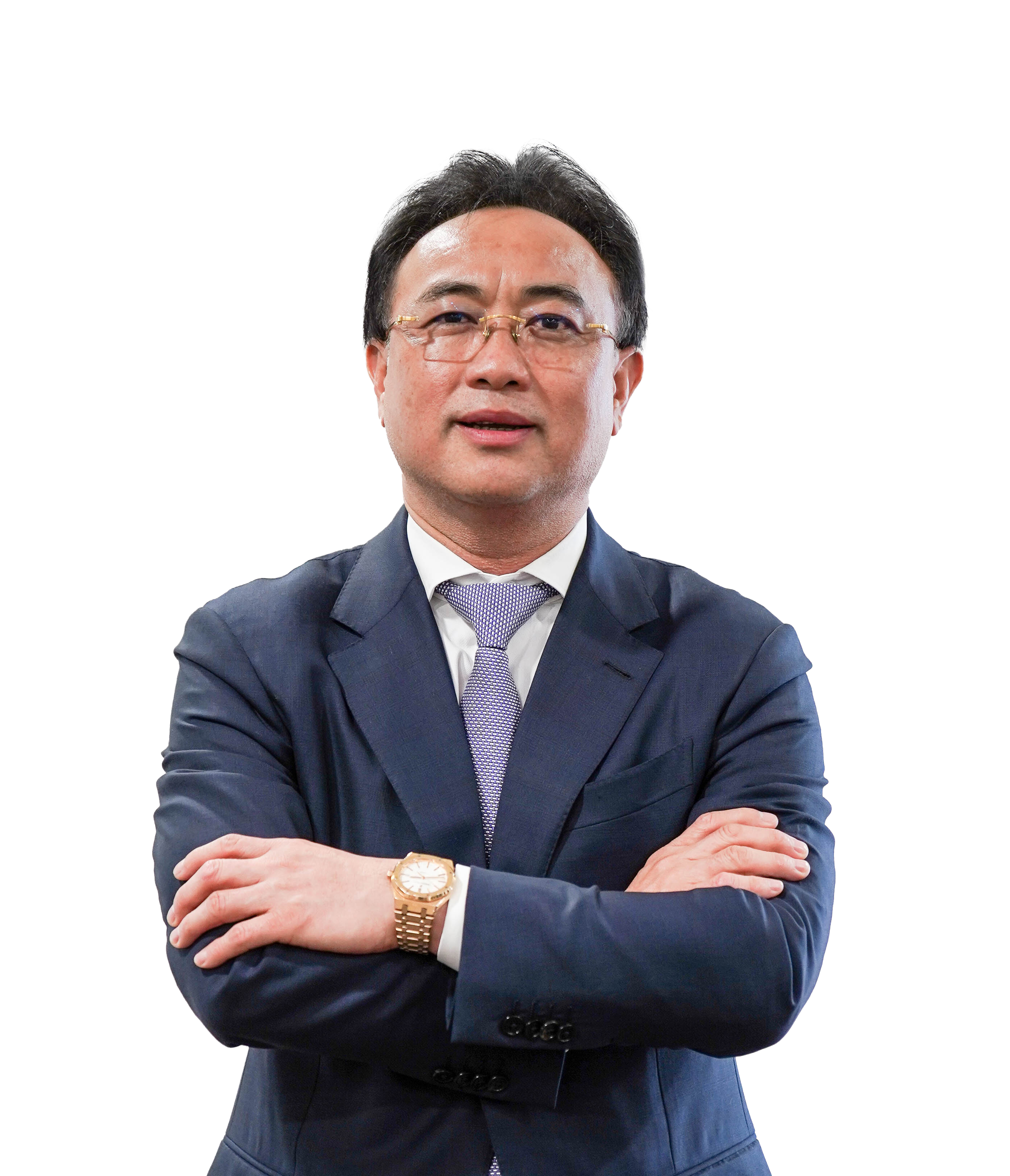
- Kith Meng in 2024
- Born: 1 September 1968 (age 58); Kandal, Cambodia
- Citizenship: Cambodia; Australia
- Education: University of Canberra (Economics B.A.)
- Occupations: Chairman & CEO of The Royal Group
- Years active: 1991–present
- Known for: Businessman
- Spouse: Mao Chamnan
- Children: 4

Chinese name
- Simplified Chinese: 陈丰明
- Traditional Chinese: 陳豐明
Transcriptions
Standard Mandarin
- Hanyu Pinyin: Chén Fēngmíng
- Website: Royal Group

Kith Meng (Khmer: គិត ម៉េង; Chinese: 陈丰明) is a Chinese Cambodian businessman who is the Chairman and CEO of Royal Group of Companies.

== Early life and education ==
Meng is the youngest of three sons of Chinese Cambodian businessman Kith Peng Ike. He lived in Kandal Province until 1975 when the advent of the Khmer Rouge regime caused major social upheaval. His family were among those targeted by the Khmer Rouge because of their wealth, ethnicity and socio-economic status. The entire family was sent to a labour camp where, upon arrival, Meng and his two brothers were separated from their parents who later died of starvation. During the confusion resulting from the Vietnamese invasion of Kampuchea, Meng escaped with his older brother Kith Thieng to Phnom Penh, from which they then fled for the refugee camps in Thailand in 1980. While living in Suan Plu, Bangkok, Meng later related, “They put us in a pig farm...we slept with the pigs...we no longer existed; we had no state, nothing." In 1981, an older brother, Sophan Kith, found Meng and Thieng in the Thai refugee camp system and arranged for their immigration to Australia, settling in Canberra.

Meng studied at Melba High School and then received a degree in economics from Australian National University. He worked several jobs in Canberra including selling Kodak film and then in financial services before returning to Cambodia at the start of the UNTAC administration.

== Career ==
Meng returned to Cambodia in 1991 where he and his older brother Sophan Kith began selling furniture and office supplies to the UN and operated a Canon copiers franchise before establishing The Royal Group. Sophan died in 1994, and Meng took over as head of The Royal Group. Meng forged joint ventures between Cambodian and international companies. Given his dealings in importing telecommunications equipment, this gave him the opportunity in 1996 to partner with Millicom International Cellular SA to jointly own and establish the 1st mobile operator in Cambodia called CamGSM Co. Ltd (Cellcard).

Meng’s strategic partnerships and investments have introduced advanced technologies and business practices to the country, enhancing its global economic integration. Meng’s influence extends across several critical sectors. He has been instrumental in attracting foreign investments, facilitating technological transfers, and promoting economic modernization.

In 2008, Meng unseated Sok Kong as President of Cambodia's Chamber Of Commerce. He was reelected in 2023 for his fifth 3-year term.

=== Other roles ===
- President of the Phnom Penh Chamber of Commerce 2005–Present
- Chair of ASEAN Business Advisory Council (ASEAN-BAC) 2012 & 2022
- Cambodian Chair at the ASEAN Business Advisory Council (ASEAN-BAC)
- Chairman, GMS Business Council, Cambodia
- Chairman, ACMECS Business Council, Cambodia
- Chair of East Asia Business Council 2022
- Chairman of Lancang-Mekong Business Council

== Politics ==
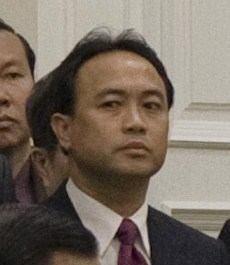
Kith Meng at a state dinner 2010

Commentators have compared Meng to other well-known Asian tycoons including Singapore's Lee Kuan Yew and Thailand's Thaksin Shinawatra. However, Meng has downplayed suggestions he may one day stand for Prime Minister, saying, "leave politics to the politicians". Meng often accompanied Cambodia's then-prime minister, Hun Sen, on overseas trips to help promote Cambodia's economic interests and has been described as a strong supporter of Hun Sen. Meng carries the honorary title of "Neak Oknha", a title bestowed by the Royal Family on those who make contributions of $100,000 or more.

== Philanthropy ==
In 2020, Kith Meng and his spouse donated $500,000 to the Cambodian government to fight COVID-19. Meng joined hands in providing donation to the Royal Government of Cambodia to help tackle and support the landmine clearing projects across the Kingdom and the annual support towards the Cambodian Red Cross's humanitarian projects and Kantha Bopha Children's Hospital.

== Personal life ==
Meng is married to Mao Chamnan, and together they have four children —two sons and two daughters.
