= Kingdom Breweries =

- Industry: Alcoholic beverage
- Founded: 2009
- Headquarters: Phnom Penh, Cambodia
- Key people: Douglas Clayton (Director)
- Products: Beer
- Owner: Leopard Capital, Charles Street International Holdings
- Website: Official website

Kingdom Breweries is a Cambodian craft beer brewery company that was founded in 2009. It is the largest craft brewery in Southeast Asia, serving as a backend production hub for over 30 craft brewers in Thailand, Hong Kong, Singapore and the Philippines. It is located in Phnom Penh, Cambodia, along the banks of the Tonlé Sap River on the north end of the city, and is housed in a renovated factory formerly occupied by Nestlé.

The company is co-owned by Leopard Cambodia Fund, Cambodia's first private equity fund operated by frontier markets private equity firm Leopard Capital, and Charles Street International Holdings.

Kingdom launched its first beer, Clouded Leopard Pilsener, in September 2010, which was awarded a Belgian Monde Selection Gold Quality Award in 2011.

== Products ==
Kingdom offers four types of beer:

- Kingdom Pilsener – a traditional pilsener (5% alc/vol)
- Kingdom IPA – a hoppy, amber-colored beer (5.8% alc/vol)
- Kingdom Mango IPA – a full-bodied IPA with a hint of mango (5.8% alc/vol)
- Kingdom White – a Belgian-style wheat beer (5% alc/vol)

== The Taproom ==
The Taproom at Kingdom Breweries

The brewery has an onsite bar and lounge known as the Taproom, where visitors have an opportunity to sample the brewery's variety of beers and take guided tours of the facility.
