= Naga 3 =

Naga 3 Tower A
- Interactive map of the Naga 3 Tower A area

General information
- Status: Under construction
- Location: Samdach Sothearos Boulevard; Phnom Penh, Cambodia
- Coordinates: 11°33′13″N 104°55′59″E

Height
- Height: 358 metres (1,175 ft)

Technical details
- Floor count: 75

Design and construction
- Architect: SOM

Naga 3 is an on-hold hotel and casino complex in Phnom Penh, Cambodia. It is developed by Hong Kong-based NagaCorp and is scheduled to open on 30 September 2029. The tallest skyscraper in the complex will be 358 metres (1,175 ft) tall and will have 75 stories, which will make it the tallest building in Cambodia.
