= IPR Microfinance Institution =

Cambodian agricultural institution

- Native name: Intean Poalroath Rongroeurng Ltd.
- Industry: Microfinance
- Founded: 2005
- Founders: Oknha Phou Puy and Hao Simorn
- Headquarters: Phnom Penh, Cambodia
- Key people: Oknha Phou Puy and Hort Bun Son
- Products: Individual Loans
- Number of employees: 108 (2016)
- Website: www.iprmfi.com

Intean Poalroath Rongroeurng (IPR) is a Cambodian microfinance institution focused on the domestic agricultural sector. IPR is headquartered in Phnom Penh, Cambodia, and operates six branch offices including several service post offices in five provinces: Kandal, Takéo, Pursat, Battambang, and Banteay Meanchey.

The Company provides credit to farmers living in rural areas that are engaged in the production of rice, cassava, maize, sesame, and other agricultural related enterprises. As of 2012, IPR managed the 12th largest loan portfolio among registered micro-finance institutions in Cambodia.

== History ==
Intean Poalroath Rongroeurng (meaning Credit, Population, and Prosperity in Khmer) was founded by Mr. Oknha Phou Puy and Ms. Hao Simorn as a credit unit of the Federation of Cambodian Rice Millers Associations, to alleviate capital constraints of rice mill entrepreneurs who lacked access to credit to expand agricultural production.

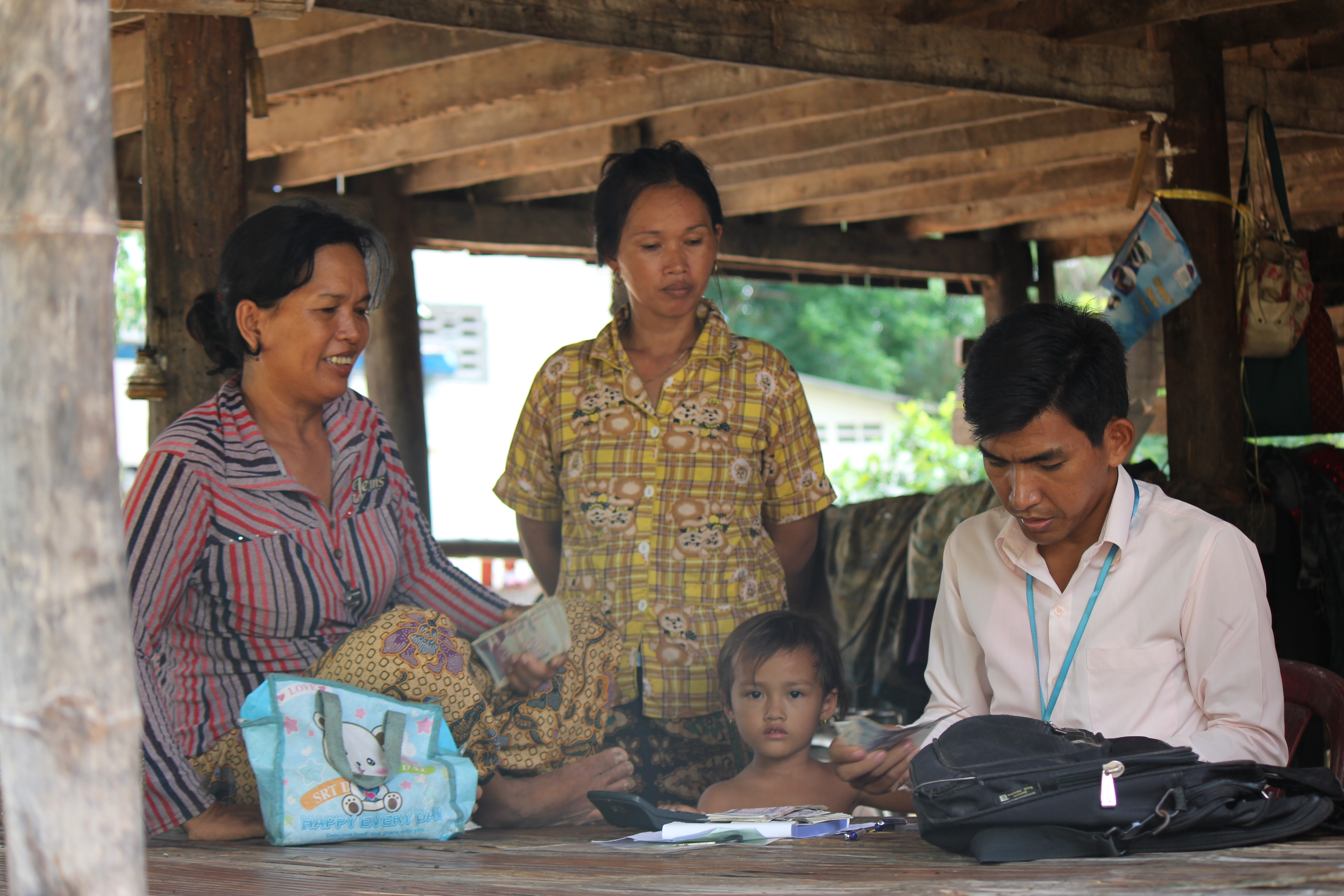
IPR credit officer speaking with clients in Takéo Province, Cambodia

In January 2005, the unit registered with the National Bank of Cambodia as a rural credit operator. In July of the same year, the unit transformed into a private limited liability company and officially registered with the Ministry of Commerce under the name "Intean Poalroath Rongroeurng Ltd" or IPR.

A new permanent MFI license that took the capital increase into account was granted by the NBC on June 19, 2009. In 2010, the Company's ownership underwent a significant change; Ms. Hao Simorn transferred her shares to Mr. Oknha Phou Puy, and on December 31, 2010, Leopard Cambodia Fund, Cambodia's first private equity fund operated by frontier markets private equity firm Leopard Capital took a minority stake in IPR through its Hong Kong based holding company IPR (HK) Limited.

As of 2016, IPR served over 3,500 clients in more than 435 villages across Cambodia, and is a member of the Cambodian Microfinance Association.
