= Social organization in Cambodia =

Social organization in Cambodia is very hierarchical. The greater a person's age, the greater the level of respect that must be granted to them. Everyone in Khmer culture is given a hierarchical title before the name - in some cases names are shortened with the title added before the name is given - which varies in relation to the person.

In some cases elders are referred to by a family title even though there is no relation, out of respect to their seniority in life. Referring to someone by the improper title is a sign of disrespect and would be assumed as improper parenting or a lack of respect for elders.

== Description ==
In the late 1980s, the nuclear family, consisting of a husband and a wife and their unmarried children, probably continued to be the most important kin group within Khmer society. The family is the major unit of both production and consumption. Within this unit are the strongest emotional ties, the assurance of aid in the event of trouble, economic cooperation in labor, sharing of produce and income, and contribution as a unit to ceremonial obligations. A larger grouping, the personal kindred that includes a nuclear family with the children, grandchildren, grandparents, uncles, aunts, first cousins, nephews, and nieces, may be included in the household.

Family organization is weak, and ties between related families beyond the kindred are loosely defined at best. There is no tradition of family names, although the French tried to legislate their use in the early twentieth century. Most Khmer genealogies extend back only two or three generations, which contrasts with the veneration of ancestors by the Vietnamese and by the Chinese. Noble families and royal families, some of which can trace their descent for several generations, are exceptions.

The individual Khmer is surrounded by a small inner circle of family and friends who constitute his or her closest associates, those he would approach first for help. In rural communities, neighbors—who are often also kin—may be important, too, and much of housebuilding and other heavy labor-intensive tasks are performed by groups of neighbors. Beyond this close circle are more distant relatives and casual friends. In rural Cambodia, the strongest ties a Khmer may develop—besides those to the nuclear family and to close friends—are those to other members of the local community.

A strong feeling of pride—for the village, for the district, and province—usually characterizes Cambodian community life. There is much sharing of religious life through the local Buddhist temple, and there are many cross-cutting kin relations within the community. Formerly, the Buddhist priesthood, the national armed forces, and, to a lesser extent, the civil service all served to connect the Khmer to the wider national community. The priesthood served only males, however, while membership in some components of the armed forces and in the civil service was open to women as well.

Two fictive relationships in Cambodia transcend kinship boundaries and serve to strengthen interpersonal and interfamily ties. A Khmer may establish a fictive child-parent or sibling relationship called thoa (roughly translating as adoptive parent or sibling). The person desiring to establish the thoa relationship will ask the other person for permission to enter into the relationship. The thoa relationship may become as close as the participants desire. The second fictive relationship is that of kloeu (close male friend).

This is similar, in many ways, to becoming a blood brother. A person from one place may ask a go-between in another place to help him establish a kloeu relationship with someone in that place. Once the participants agree, a ceremony is held that includes ritual drinking of water into which small amounts of the participants' blood have been mixed and bullets and knives have been dipped. Prayers are also recited by an achar (or ceremonial leader) before witnesses.

The kloeu relationship is much stronger than the thoa. One kloeu will use the same kinship terms when addressing his kloeu's parents and siblings as he would when addressing his own. The two friends can call upon each other for any kind of help at any time. The kloeu relationship apparently is limited to some rural parts of Cambodia and to Khmer-speaking areas in Thailand. As of the late 1980s, it may have become obsolete. The female equivalent of kloeu is mreak.

Legally, the husband is the head of the Khmer family, but the wife has considerable authority, especially in family economics. The husband is responsible for providing shelter and food for his family; the wife is generally in charge of the family budget, and she serves as the major ethical and religious model for the children, especially the daughters. In rural areas, the male is mainly responsible for such activities as plowing and harrowing the rice paddies, threshing rice, collecting sugar palm juice, caring for cattle, carpentry, and buying and selling cows and chickens. Women are mainly responsible for pulling and transplanting rice seedlings, harvesting and winnowing rice, tending gardens, making sugar, weaving, and caring for the household money. Both males and females may work at preparing the rice paddies for planting, tending the paddies, and buying and selling land.

Ownership of property among the rural Khmer was vested in the nuclear family. Descent and inheritance is bilateral. Legal children might inherit equally from their parents. The division of property was theoretically equal among siblings, but in practice the oldest child might inherit more. Each of the spouses might bring inherited land into the family, and the family might acquire joint land during the married life of the couple. Each spouse was free to dispose of his or her land as he or she chose. A will was usually oral, although a written one was preferred.

As the married couple moves through life they have children, nurture and train them, educate them, and marry them off. When they become too old to support themselves, they may invite the youngest child's family to move in and to take over running the household. At this stage in their lives, they enjoy a position of high status, they help care for grandchildren, and they devote more time in service to the wat (temple).

== See also ==
- Social class in Cambodia
