= Teng Bunma =

Cambodian tycoon

Neak Oknha Teng Bunma
- ថេង ប៊ុនម៉ា
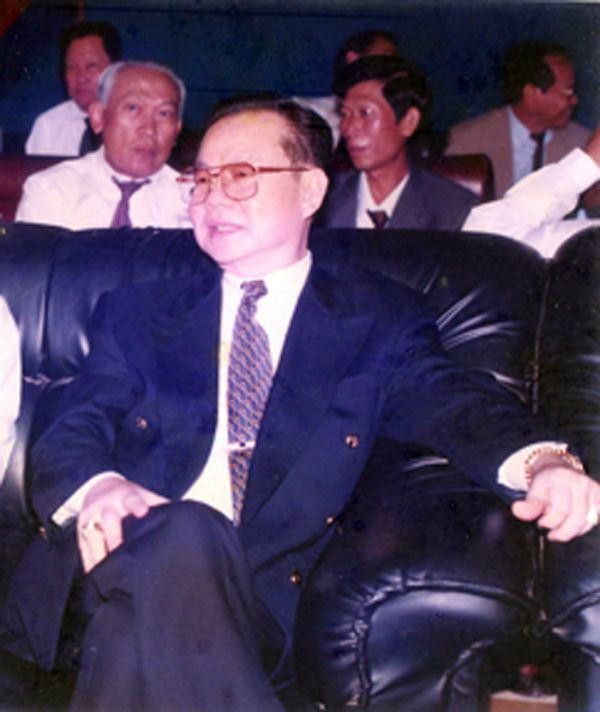
- Teng Bunma sitting at a business meeting
- Born: 1941; Phnom Penh, Cambodia
- Died: 17 June 2016 (aged 74–75)
- Occupations: Business magnate; investor; philanthropist
- Known for: Co-founder and first president of the Cambodian Chamber of Commerce
- Title: Lok Oknha

Teng Bunma 許銳騰 (Khmer: ថេង ប៊ុនម៉ា; 1941 – 17 June 2016), also written as Teng Boonma, Theng Boonma, and Theng Bunma, was one of the wealthiest businessmen in Cambodia. He was one the founders of Thai Boon Roong Group and, along with Sok Kong and Meng Retthy, he was well known as one of the “four tigers” of the Cambodian economy after the fall of the Khmer Rouge, between the 1980s-2000s.

== Biography ==
=== Origin ===
Teng Bunma was of Chinese Cambodian descent.

=== Bringing Cambodia back to democracy and back to business (1990-1997) ===
Teng Bunma was one of the first Cambodian businesspeople to invest significantly in Cambodia after the fall of the Khmer Rouge in 1979. Having spent much of his life in Thailand, like many of Cambodia’s early tycoons he began cutting informal deals with the country’s government in the 1980s, before the economy had officially opened.

In the early 1990s, Teng Bunma bankrolled key battles in the continued war against the Khmer Rouge. However, Sam Rainsy began accusing Teng Bunma of gold smuggling and customs fraud, and placed him at the center of a wide circle of drug traffickers. In October 1994, this led to a showdown between the two over a Phnom Penh market development that had dispossessed local vendors. Thereafter, Sam Rainsy was dumped from the Cabinet, kicked out of the Funcinpec, and stripped from his seat in Parliament in June 1995.

Teng Bunma is a key example of how the emergence of free market policies in the late 1980s and the rapid privatization of common resources and state assets, legalised the businesses of former traffickers and helped them set up companies which dominate the Cambodian private sector today. In order to bring an end to the ongoing civil war, he bankrolled any groups that were ready to fight against the last Khmer rouge warriors and in return he was awarded state contracts and licences to monopolise particular types of imports. Thus, with his Cambodian business partner Sok Kong, chairman of Sokimex, he helped to fund the recapture of Pailin from the Khmer Rouge in 1994, where he later opened his own casino.

In late 1995, Teng Bunma was elected as the first president of the Cambodian Chamber of Commerce.

Teng Bunma invested heavily in the private sector, especially in real estate, but also supported the development of public infrastructure, such as the construction of “Hun Sen Park” in Phnom Penh in 1996.

=== Involvement in the 1997 coup ===
Rather than choose a side, Teng Bunma was notorious for supporting a plurality of political actors in Cambodia from party officials to royalist party rebels, while others accused him of suppressing the voices critical of the Cambodian People's Party; in 1994, he gave the government an interest-free loan to help make up a budget shortfall. He also donated a bullet-proof Mercedes limousine to Hun Sen, and a $1.8 million aircraft to Norodom Ranariddh, the joint prime minister between 1993 and 1997. It has also been alleged that Teng Bunma was also a financier of a band of politicians who launched a failed coup against Hun Sen in 1994, and was thought to have been close to Hun Sen’s rivals within the Cambodian People's Party, Interior Minister Sar Kheng and National Assembly-chair Chea Sim.

Teng Bunma, then Cambodia's wealthiest businessman, traveled to Beijing on a special mission shortly before the coup of the 1997 coup d'état led by Hun Sen. Teng Bunma later boasted during a press conference of funding Hun Sen’s coup in 1997, providing also material help by lending his own fleet of helicopters to transfer troops to Western Cambodia. Hun Sen acknowledged that without the financial support of Teng Bunma, his coup would have failed. In October 1997, Teng Bunma received a timber concession of one million acres from the Cambodian government.

=== Facing international warrants: Medellin on the Mekong (1997-2000) ===
In June 1998, Thailand issued an arrest warrant against Teng Bunma on fraud charges. Police determinations took place also in Hong Kong in 1999: there Bunma had submitted a falsified passport for the registration of its enterprise "to Thai Boon Roong". A 1996 article ("Medellin on the Mekong") in the Hong Kong-based Far Eastern Economic Review, by United States journalist Nate Thayer, described Teng Bunma as a significant figure in Cambodia's international drug-smuggling trade. In 1996, he was named in the United States campaign finance controversy during which the Chinese allegedly attempted to influence domestic American politics prior to and during the Clinton administration. Though he was blocked from entering the United States, Teng Bunma received a US visa in 1998.

In 1999, King Norodom Sihanouk publicly refused a luxury car that Teng Bunma had offered him, on the grounds that he was being investigated by the United States of America. However, Hun Sen himself intervened to award diplomatic immunity to Teng Bunma for falsifying immigration documents, which was considered abusing ambassadorial powers to evade the law by some human rights group.

=== The godfather of the Cambodian booming economy (2000-2016) ===
At the beginning of the third millennium, Teng Bunma had become "one of the most powerful men in Cambodia", "Cambodia's best-known and wealthiest businessman with total assets estimated at around $400 million." At that time, he began investing in major construction projects worth more 50 millions dollars and to diversify his portfolio with a wider range of activities, such as growing cotton. He took an important role of leadership in the business community to the point of becoming a "kingmaker". In 2000, Guo Dongpo, who was the director of the Overseas Chinese Affairs Office office in Beijing, met Teng Bunma to ask for his assistance in controlling unruly mainland gang activity in the Cambodia, as the latter had become "legendary" among the Chinese Khmer community.

=== Later years and death ===
Teng Bunma died at the age of 75 on June 17, 2016 at 12.45 pm in a hospital in Phnom Penh by natural causes, leaving the 133 story Thai Boon Roong Twin Tower World Trade Center in Phnom Penh, located next to Nagaworld, unfinished. This construction site has been inactive since the COVID-19 pandemic, and it is possible that the project has been canceled, although no official announcement has been made regarding its cancellation.

== Legacy ==
=== Real estate ===
Teng Bunma left being him one of the largest real estate empires in Cambodia. He owned the luxury Intercontinental hotel in Phnom Penh and Rasmei Kampuchea, the country's most influential newspaper. His son's company, in partnership with foreign investors, owns the Caesar international casino in Pailin, a mining town in western Cambodia.

=== Cambodian Chamber of Commerce ===
Teng Bunma was elected as the first president of Cambodia's Chamber of Commerce in 1995, a useful position for networking in a country where wealth is concentrated in the hands of a small group of closely connected politicians, military officials and businessmen.

=== The forefather of Hun Sen's elite pack ===
In a 2015 paper, Teng Bunma was described as the prototype of the new Khmer oknha by Michiel Verver and Heidi Schnetzinger who explained the “elite pact” between the business and political elites through the oknha system of Cambodia.

== Character ==
Teng Bunma has been described as a "trigger-happy tycoon" following incidents where he used or brandished hand guns. In the first incident he shot out a $3000 tire of an airplane on the tarmac after complaining that he was frustrated with the airline's service. He was quoted as saying he had lost his "temper and control and had to shoot one of the plane's tires" and that he wanted to "shoot more of them, to make sure that all were flat, but there were a lot of passengers surrounding the plane". In the second incident he brandished a gun inside an airplane and demanded the crew delay takeoff until his late friends arrived.

== Awards and recognition ==
Teng Bunma received an honorary degree from Iowa Wesleyan University at the request of his business partner, Ted Sioeng.
