= Comin Asia =

Engineering company

Comin Asia is an engineering company and general contractor based in Cambodia, Vietnam, Thailand, Laos, and Myanmar. Comin participates in major construction and improvement projects in Southeast Asia and the Mekong River area, including hotels, factories, infrastructure projects, power plants, network security and automation, and office buildings.

== Company ==
The company is composed of six major subsidiaries:

- Comin Khmere, Cambodia based in Phnom Penh
- Comin Asia, Vietnam based in Hanoi and Ho Chi Minh City
- Comin Asia, Laos based in Vientiane
- Comin Asia, Myanmar based in Yangon
- Comin Asia, Singapore.

== History ==
Comin Khmere was first established in 1960 as a branch of the East Asiatic Company and by 1966 had 15 subsidiary companies employing over 3,000 people. The company was dissolved during the war in Cambodia in the 1970s and reformed in 1992.

In 1992, Comin Khmere and Comin Vietnam began operations working on building projects and infrastructure projects in the Mekong River area.

In 2010 Comin Asia started collaborating with RMA Group in the field of engineering.

== Operations ==
Comin Asia specializes in mechanical engineering and electrical engineering work, typically providing electrical systems, electrical grid connections, elevator automation systems, air conditioning and heating systems, and communications systems for its clients. The company specializes in work for the hospitality industry, including hotels and resorts.

Major contracts and commissions include:

Cambodia:

- American Embassy
- Crown Can Factory - PP & SHV
- Vattanac Capital Tower
- ACLEDA Bank Plc Headquarters
- AEON Mall Phnom Penh
- International School Of Phnom Penh
- National Bank of Cambodia
- Siem Reap International Airport and Phnom Penh International Airport projects
- The construction of the 23 MW Kampot Power Plant in association with Wärtsilä Finland
- The construction of a 30 MW power plant for electrical utility company Khmer Electrical Power in association with Wärtsilä Finland

Vietnam:

- Golden Westlake Residential Development
- Sheraton Nha Trang
- BIDV Tower
- RMIT Academic Building 2
- Le Meridien Saigon
- Camau Power Plant
- Hanoi Petroleum Trading Center, an office building owned by PetroVietnam

Thai:

- Karma Samui
- Conrad Resort & Spa Koh Samui
- KC Hotel
- CD&P Unique
- The Lotus Terrace
- KC Beach

Laos:

- Lao CoCa Cola Bottling
- Mascot

Myanmar:

- Honey Garments Factory
- Coca-Cola Pinya Beverages Myanmar
