= Sok Siphana =

Cambodian lawyer

His Excellency Sok Siphana
- សុក ស៊ីផាន់ណា
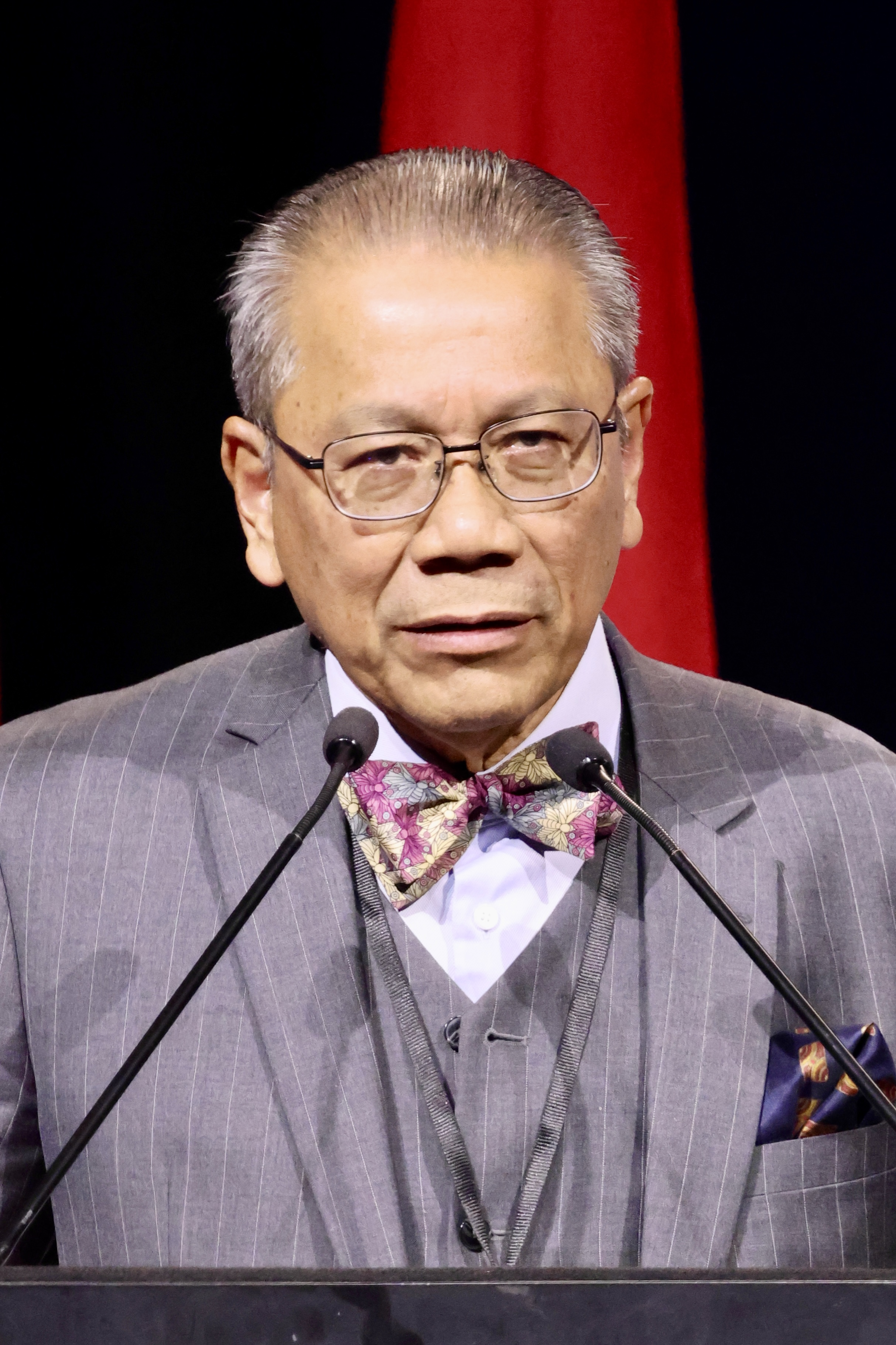
- Sok in 2025

Senior Minister in Charge of Special Missions
- Incumbent
- Assumed office 22 August 2023
- Prime Minister: Hun Manet

Personal details
- Born: 16 April 1960 (age 66) Phnom Penh, Cambodia
- Party: Cambodian People's Party
- Spouse: Khieu Mealy
- Sok Siphana's voice Sok speaking about ASEAN; Recorded 27 August 2025

Sok Siphana (Khmer: សុក ស៊ីផាន់ណា; born April 16, 1960) is a Cambodian politician, diplomat, former lawyer, and academician serving as Senior Minister in charge of Special Missions (Multilateral Trade and Economic Affairs) in the 7th mandate of the Royal Government of Cambodia since August 22, 2023. He is also the 1st Vice-Chair of the Council of Legal Reform, Chairman of the Trade Policy Advisory Board, and Chair of the Committee on the Promotion of Resolutions of Private Sector Issues, which operates under the Cabinet of the Prime Minister.

== Early life and education ==
Sok spent his adolescent life in the Killing Fields of Cambodia, before moving to the United States as a refugee in 1980. He holds multiple law degrees from institutions across the United States, Australia, and France. He earned a Juris Doctor (J.D.) from Widener University School of Law in Delaware, United States (1992), a Doctor of Philosophy (Ph.D.) from Bond University School of Law in Queensland, Australia (2009), and a Docteur en Droit from Université Paris II Panthéon-Assas, France (2022).

== Career ==
Between 1993 and 1999, Sok was a legal adviser at the United Nations Development Programme. In 1999 he was appointed vice minister of commerce in Cambodia, where he was responsible for the nation’s accession to the World Trade Organization. After Cambodia’s successful accession to the WTO in 2004, he worked as director of technical cooperation at the International Trade Centre.

Sok is a practicing attorney and the principal at SokSiphana & Associates (a member of ZICO Law), a law and consulting firm specialized in international trade and corporate law in Phnom Penh. He was appointed by Prime Minister Samdech Techo Hun Sen concurrently as advisor of the Royal Government of Cambodia and advisor to the Supreme National Economic Council with rank of minister in August 2009 and November 2011 respectively. He also serves as the chairman of the board of Cambodia Development Resource Institute (CDRI), Cambodia’s oldest and prominent independent research institute.

In early 2013, Sok was the Cambodian government’s candidate to succeed Kandeh Yumkella as director general of UNIDO; the position went to Li Yong.

== Government and diplomatic roles ==
Between 1999 and 2005, he was secretary of state at the Ministry of Commerce, acting as Cambodia's lead negotiator for the country's accession to the World Trade Organization (WTO). From 2005 to 2009, he served as director at the International Trade Center (ITC), a joint technical agency of UNCTAD and WTO in Geneva, Switzerland.

In August 2009, he was appointed as advisor to the Royal Government of Cambodia with the rank of minister, serving concurrently with the Ministry of Foreign Affairs and International Cooperation (MFAIC), the Supreme National Economic Council (SNEC), and the Council for the Development of Cambodia (CDC). In September 2018, he was reappointed as senior advisor with the rank of senior minister.

Since 2011, he has been closely involved in Cambodia’s diplomatic and economic strategies, particularly during Cambodia’s ASEAN Chairmanships (2012 and 2022). He served as ASEAN Task Force Member on Substantive Issues, Cambodian Sherpa to the G20, and chair of the National Sub-Committee on Substances and Documentation. He has also been a senior official (SOM) for ASEM, ACD, CICA, and Mekong Cooperation initiatives, as well as chairman of the Mekong-Lancang Special Fund. Additionally, he was co-chair of the ASEAN-India Eminent Persons Group and high-level Cambodian representative to the G20 Development Working Group.

In 2023, he was appointed as senior minister in charge of special missions, overseeing multilateral trade and economic affairs. His additional roles include vice-chair of the Council of Legal Reform, chairman of the Trade Policy Advisory Board, and chair of the Committee on the Promotion of Resolutions of Private Sector Issues.

== Legal and academic contributions ==
From 2010 to 2023, Sok Siphana was the founding partner of SokSiphana & Associates, a Phnom Penh-based law and consulting firm specializing in international trade and corporate law. He currently serves as emeritus chairman of the board of the Asian Vision Institute (AVI), an independent policy think tank he led from 2019.

From 2011 to 2017, he was chairman of the Cambodia Development Resource Institute (CDRI), Cambodia’s oldest independent research institute. He also hosted Cambodia’s Global Dialogue, a weekly policy talk show on South East Asia TV (SEATV) from 2011 to 2018.

== Honors and recognition ==
On October 13, 2022, His Majesty King Norodom Sihamoni bestowed upon him the lifetime Royal Title of “Bundit Sapheacha” (academician) at the Royal Academy of Cambodia. On July 20, 2023, he was awarded a full professorship for his contributions to legal and policy research in Cambodia.
