= Social class in Cambodia =

Historical and modern structure of Cambodian social classes

The structure of social class in Cambodia (Khmer: វណ្ណៈសង្គម [ʋannaʔ sɑŋkum]) has altered several times throughout its history. The traditional hereditary elites were marginalised in the 1970s, when military leaders gained prominence, before the Khmer Rouge attempted to dramatically eliminate existing class structures in the late 1970s. Since the emergence of peace in the early 1990s, social inequality has increased in Cambodia.

== Pre-republican Cambodia ==
Social strata in pre-republican Cambodia may be viewed as constituting a spectrum, with an elite group or upper class at one end and a lower class consisting of rural peasants and unskilled urban workers at the other end. The elite group was composed of high-ranking government, military, and religious leaders, characterized by high prestige, wealth, and education or by members one of the royal or noble families. Each one of the subgroups had its own internal ranking system. Before the ousting of Sihanouk in 1970, the highest ranks of the elite group were filled largely by those born into them.

Somewhere in the middle of this social spectrum was a small middle class, which included both Khmer and non-Khmer of medium prestige. Members of this class included businessmen, white-collar workers, teachers, physicians, most of the Buddhist clergy, shopkeepers, clerks, and military officers of lower and middle rank. Many Chinese, Vietnamese, and members of other ethnic minorities belonged to the middle class. The Khmer were a majority only among the military and among the civil servants.

The lower class consisted of rural small farmers, fishermen, craftsmen, and blue-collar urban workers. The majority of Cambodians belonged to this group. Most of the members of the lower class were Khmer, but other ethnic groups, including most of the Chams, Khmer Loeu, some Vietnamese, and a few Chinese, were included. This class was virtually isolated from, and was uninterested in, the activities of the much smaller urban middle and upper classes.

Within the lower class, fewer status distinctions existed; those that did depended upon attributes such as age, sex, moral behavior, and religious piety. Traditional Buddhist values were important on the village level. Old age was respected, and older men and women received deferential treatment in terms of language and behavior. All else being equal, males generally were accorded a higher social status than females. Good character—honesty, generosity, compassion, avoidance of quarrels, chastity, warmth—and personal religious piety also increased status.

Generosity toward others and to the wat was important. Villagers accorded respect and honor to those whom they perceived as having authority or prestige. Buddhist monks and nuns, teachers, high-ranking government officials, and members of the hereditary aristocracy made up this category. Persons associated with those who possessed prestige tended to derive prestige and to be accorded respect therefrom.

Social mobility was played out on an urban stage. There was little opportunity among the majority of the rural Cambodians to change social status; this absence of opportunity was a reflection of traditional Buddhist fatalism. A man could achieve higher status by entering the monkhood or by acquiring an education and then entering the military or the civil service. Opportunities in government service, especially for white-collar positions, were highly prized by Cambodian youth. The availability of such positions did not keep pace with the number of educated youths, and in the late 1960s and the early 1970s this lag began to cause widespread dissatisfaction.

== Khmer Republic ==
The republican regime in the early 1970s invalidated all royal and noble titles, and the only titles of social significance legally in use in connection with the elite group were those gained through achievement. Military and government titles tended to replace royal and noble titles. In spite of the legislated loss of titles, wide public recognition of the royalty and the nobility continued. The deferential linguistic usages and the behavior styles directed toward members of these groups persisted through the 1970s and, to a limited extent, were still present in the late 1980s.

In the early 1970s, the senior military officers, some of whom were also members of the aristocracy, replaced the hereditary aristocracy as the most influential group in the country. To some extent this upper stratum of the upper class was closed, and it was extremely difficult to move into it and to attain positions of high power. The closed nature of the group frustrated many members of the small intellectual elite.

This group, positioned at the lower end of the elite group, consisted of civil servants, professional people, university students, and some members of the Buddhist hierarchy. It had become large enough to be politically influential by the 1970s. For example, student strikes were serious enough in 1972 to force the government to close some schools.

== Khmer Rouge Era ==
The Khmer Rouge characterized Cambodians as belonging to one of several classes:

- The feudal class (members of the royal family and high government or military officials).
- The capitalist class (business people).
- The petite bourgeoisie (civil servants, professionals, small business people, teachers, servants, and clerics).
- The peasant class (the rich, the mid-level, and the poor, based on whether or not they could hire people to work their land and on whether or not they had enough food).
- The worker class (the independent worker, the industrial worker, and the party members).
- The "special" classes (revolutionary intellectuals, military and police officials, and Buddhist monks).

== Modern Cambodia ==
Social inequality has increased since the 1990s, with a widening gap between urban and rural areas. Corruption and environmental degradation are ongoing issues. A 2016 report categorised Cambodians into three social classes: a small New Wealth class, a Middle Class and a Lower Income group, which consists of 62% of the population.

According to the 2022 World Bank poverty assessment Cambodia's poverty rate dropped from approximately 34% in 2009 to 18% in 2019/2020 under updated national poverty lines. However income equality as measured by the Gini coefficient rose moderately from 29.5 in 2009 to 32.2 in 2019/2020

Emerging urban middle class: 2024-25 research utilizing Asian Development Bank Institute thresholds (households earning between $4 and $20 per day) classifies this group as the core of Cambodia's expanding lower-to-upper middle class.

== Linguistic differences ==
The Khmer language reflects a somewhat different classification of the society based on a more traditional model and characterized by differing linguistic usages. This classification divided Cambodian society into three broad categories: royalty and nobility, clergy, and laity. The Khmer language had—and to a lesser extent still has—partially different lexicons for each of these groups. For example, ញ៉ាំ nhăm (to eat) was used when speaking of oneself or to those on a lower social level; ពិសា pĭsa (to eat) was used when speaking politely of someone else; ឆាន់ chhăn (to eat) was used of Buddhist clergy, and សោយ saôy (to eat) was used of royalty.

In Cambodia, the society is organized in a hierarchal way. In the language, the pronouns of the words are not spoken to a gender, but it is spoken depending on the level of society that the person is being spoken to is in, this shows in a form of respect. The Khmer Rouge attempted to do away with the different lexicons and to establish a single one for all; for example, they tried to substitute a single, rural word, ហូប hob (to eat), for all of the above words.

== See also ==
- Social organization in Cambodia
