= The Royal Group =

Cambodian conglomerate and holding company

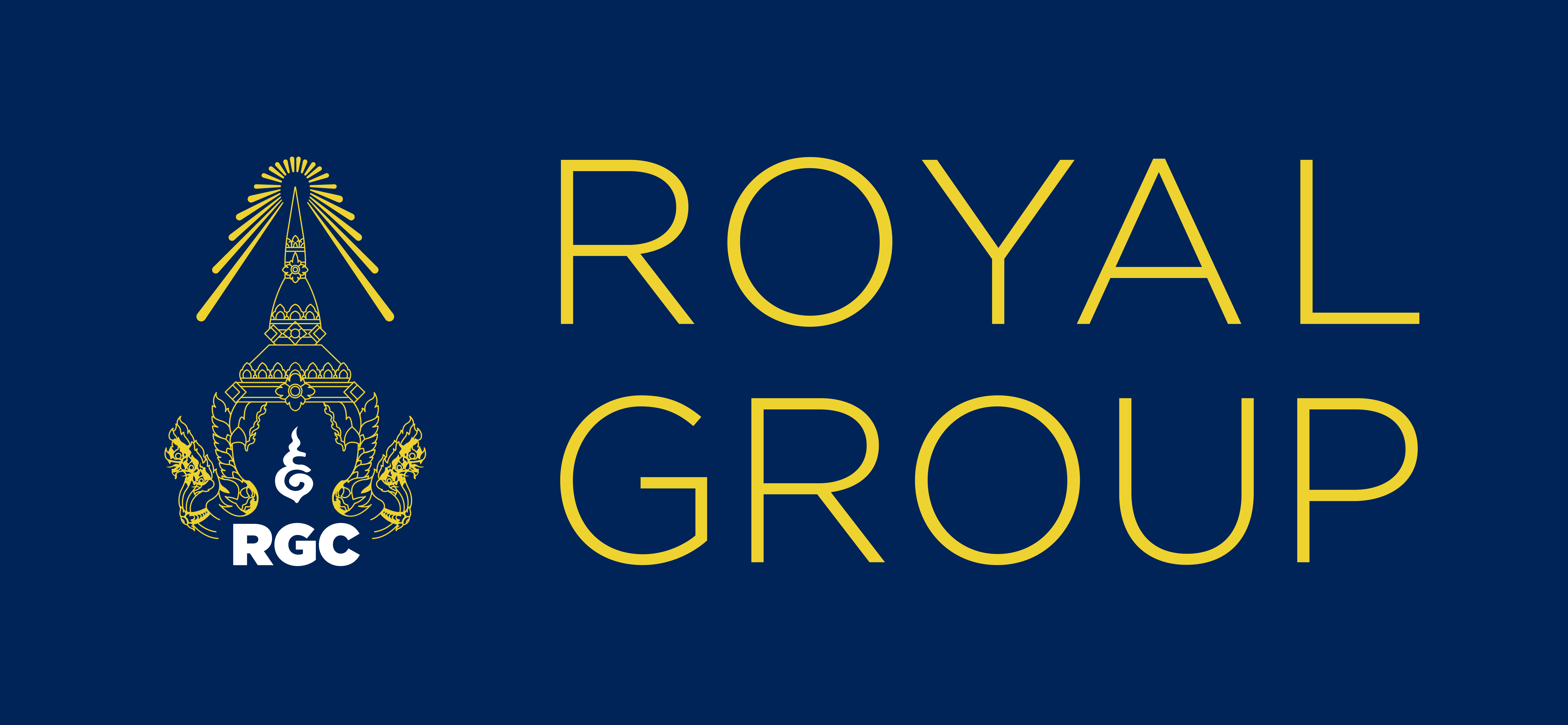
- Type: Conglomerate (company)
- Founded: 1991; 35 years ago
- Founder: Neak Oknha Kith Meng
- Headquarters: Phnom Penh, Cambodia
- Website: www.royalgroup.com.kh

The Royal Group is an investment and development conglomerate in Cambodia. It was founded by Kith Meng in 1989. The group has interests in a number of industries, including television, telecommunications and banking. It has attracted foreign investment in Cambodia.

== History ==
The Royal Group was founded by Kith Meng as a general trading company operating out of Australia in 1989 with the name Royal Cambodia Co Ltd. In 1990, The Royal Group of Companies was incorporated in the Kingdom of Cambodia.

In the 1990s, The Royal Group established trading links with the government during the UNTAC administration. The group established MobiTel and Royal Telecam through a joint venture with Millicom International Cellular.

Between 2000 and 2010, The Royal Group among other milestones, established Cambodian Broadcasting Corporation, a terrestrial UHF television service trading under the brand CTN, through Modern Times Group. The group also established ANZ Royal Bank through a partnership with Australia New Zealand Banking Group Limited.

Between 2011 and 2020, The Royal Group among other milestones, acquired Wing, a mobile payment service provider. In 2024, the group held the official launching of the Royal Group Exchange (RGX) which is currently Cambodia's first approved Securities Digital Products trading platform.

== Controversies ==
The Royal Group is one of several stakeholders in hydroelectric projects in Cambodia that have faced significant criticism for environmental concerns. These issues include illegal logging in protected areas, displacement of Indigenous communities, destruction of rural villages, and damage to fishing grounds, all of which occurred without proper environmental assessment reports. Villagers had expressed concerns about speaking up due to the prominence of the project, with some fearing retaliation. The Royal Group's land concessions in Botum Sakor National Park led to land clearing and land disputes with local communities.
