= List of tallest buildings in Cambodia =

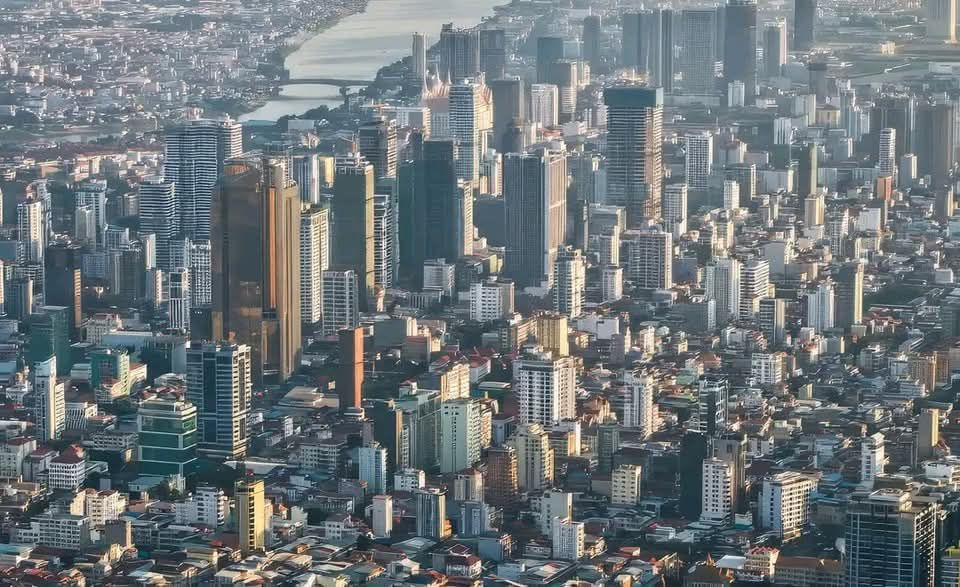
Phnom Penh, Capital City of Cambodia, Population 3.5 million 2026

This article ranks buildings in Cambodia that stand at least 150 m (492 ft) tall, based on standard height measurement. Phnom Penh, the capital of Cambodia, has over 1,877 high-rise buildings of over 14-20 floors (as of June 2025).

Across	Year	High-rise	100m+	150m+	200m+	300m+
Cambodia	2026	3,285	201	66	21	

High-rise Buildings	Super High-rise Buildings	Skyscraper	Super Tall Skyscraper	Mega Skyscraper	Iconic Skyscraper
14fl-20fl Height Under-100m	Height Over 100m+ > 149m	Height Over 150m+ > 299m	Height Over 300m+ > 499m	Height Over 500m+ > 699m	Height Over 700m+ > Over

Most of Cambodia's skyscrapers are located in Phnom Penh, the commercial and political capital of the country. Note: Siem Reap city, Cambodia governor ban all Skyscraper, All buildings standing under 12 floors only.

Cities with the most high-rise buildings

City	Year	High-rise	100m+	150m+	200m+	300m+
Phnom Penh	2026	1,902	122	36	13	
Sihanoukville	2026	1,114	68	29	08	
Poipet	2026	176	11	01		
Bavet	2026	78				
Stung Sen	2026	09				
Kampot	2026	06				
Banlung	2026	02				
Pailin	2026	02				
Kampong Chhnang	2026	02				
Kampong Cham	2026	02				
Battambang	2026	01				
Serei Saophoan	2026	01				
Stung Treng	2026	01				

== Tallest buildings above 100 m ==
This list includes topped-out and completed buildings in the Phnom Penh that stand at least 100 m (328 ft) tall. Architectural height is considered, so masts and other elements added after completion of building are not considered.

Was the tallest building in Cambodia upon completion
Indicates buildings that have been topped out but are not yet completed

Updated 05 January 2026

Rank	Name	Investors	Height (m)	Floors	Year	Notes
1	KBX Universal Financial Center	Taiwan	264.6	63	2026	Tallest building in Cambodia.
2	Morgan Enmaison 2	Hong Kong	243.8	53	2023	Tallest building in Cambodia from 2023 to 2026.
3	Urban Village Sky Prime Tower	Taiwan	242.1	63	2024	
4	The Peak Shangri-La	Singapore	236	58	2022	Tallest building in Cambodia from 2022 to 2023.
	Time Square 7	Taiwan	236	49	2027	Toping Out
5	The Peak Residential Tower 1 & 2	Singapore	224	2 X 55	2022	
6	Morgan Tower	Hong Kong	218	48	2022	
7	Morgan Enmaison 1	Hong Kong	216.2	47	2024	
	GIA Norea Tower	Taiwan	214.8	50	2026	Toping-Out
8	Gold Towers Phnom Penh	South Korea, China	211	2 X 47		Topped out, but currently on hold.
9	Time Square 6	Taiwan	210.7	49	2026	Topped out
10	Noble International Center	Taiwan	206.4	48	2026	Topped out, but currently on hold.
11	Prince Happiness Plaza B1	China	194	50	2026	
12	Urban Village Phase 2	Taiwan	193.8	3 X 51	2025	
	Anana Tower	Cambodia	192	46	2026	
13	J Tower 2	Japan	189	43	2022	
14	Vattanac Capital Tower	Cambodia	187.3	39	2014	Tallest building in Cambodia from 2014 to 2022.
15	Chipmong Tower	Cambodia	186	45	2023	
16	Prince Happiness Plaza B2 & B3	China	182	2 X 47	2024	
17	Huangshan International	China	178.6	47	2024	
18	Royal Skyland	Taiwan	178.5	51	2026	Topping out
19	GIA Tower	Taiwan	178	43	2021	
20	UC88 Tower	Cambodia	177.2	50	2026	
	M Tower	China	175.9	43	2027	Topping-Out
21	Yuetai Harbour 3A	China	175	50	2026	
22	The Skyline Cambodia	Taiwan	172	2 X 39	2018	
23	Prince Huan Yu Center 1	China	170	41	2023	
24	Wealth Mansion	Taiwan	166	46	2024	
25	Chief Tower	Taiwan	163.7	43	2025	
26	Vue Aston	Taiwan	163.4	44	2024	
27	Time Square 5	Taiwan	162	45	2025	
28	Flatiron Meridian	Taiwan	158	41	2022	
29	FTB Tower	Cambodia	157	30	2026	
30	Cambodia Tax Tower	Cambodia	156	36	2025	
31	The Gateway Residential	Taiwan	156	2 X 39	2020	
32	Prince Huan Yu Center 2	China	155.5	39	2022	
33	The Bridge Cambodia	Cambodia	154	2 X 45	2018	
34	The Penthouse Residence	Cambodia	153	43	2019	
35	Sino Plaza	China	151.2	4 X 42		Topped out, but currently on hold.
35	Aurea Square	Singapore	150.8	46	2026	
36	Chroy Changvar international	Taiwan	148	40	2019	
37	Agile Sky Residence	Taiwan	147.8	44	2022	
38	Diamond Bay Garden 1 & 2	China	147	2 X 42	2025	
39	Dingli Sunshine City	Taiwan	147	41	2024	
40	Le Conde BKK1	Taiwan	146.2	43	2025	
41	The Gateway Office Tower	Hong Kong	144	36	2020	
42	La Vista One	Taiwan	143.6	2 X 41	2024	
43	Sky Villa	Taiwan	140	2 X 35	2020	
44	Golden One	Cambodia	138.5	36	2024	
45	The Parkway Tower	Taiwan	138	36	2020	
46	One 70 Tower	Taiwan	136.8	38	2024	
47	The Flora Suites	Taiwan	136	38	2025	
48	City View Condo	Taiwan	136	34	2024	
49	East Commercial Center	Hong Kong	133	4 X 38	2018	
50	National Bank of Cambodia	Cambodia	130.5	29	2026	Topped out
51	Prince Central Plaza	China	130	37	2018	
	ESL Tower		129.5	37	2026	Toping Out
52	Golden One Residence	Taiwan	129	37	2020	
53	Royal Group Central	Cambodia	128.3	27	2025	
54	Chroy Changvar Condo	Taiwan	128	2 X 32	2024	
55	Diamond Twin Tower 1	Taiwan	126.3	32	2019	
56	Bali Scenery & Apartment No.5	Indonesia	126	35	2018	
57	Yuetai The Garden	China	126	8 X 33	2022	Completed 1 of 8
58	Norodom Business Tower	Cambodia	126	28	2025	Topped out
59	Casa Meridian	Taiwan	125.4	2 X 33	2017	
60	Imperial Crown Condominium	Taiwan	124	33	2021	
61	Ministry Customs and Excise	Cambodia	122.5	35	2020	
62	One 70 Condo	Taiwan	122.4	36	2023	
63	Ming Wuoy Group Tower	China	122.4	31	2021	
64	The Views II Residence	Taiwan	122	33	2025	
65	Diamond Twin Tower 2	Taiwan	120.6	30	2019	
66	TK-Star International	Taiwan	119	34	2020	
67	CEO KT Pacific	Taiwan	119	2 X 34	2020	
68	Phnom Penh Star	Cambodia	118.8	36	2022	
69	The View Residence	Taiwan	118	32	2018	
70	Canadia Tower	Cambodia	118	32	2009	Tallest building in Cambodia from 2009 to 2014 and the first skyscraper in Cambodia.
71	De Castle Royal	South Korea	117	33	2014	
72	Global Tech Exchange	Hong Kong	116	29	2024	
73	Phnom Penh Galaxy Garden	Cambodia	116	33	2022	
74	Green Palace Condo	Taiwan	115.5	35	2022	
75	Bali Scenery & Apartment No.2	Indonesia	115.2	32	2016	
76	Skytree Condominium	Taiwan	115	3 X 33	2020	
77	Wing Bank Tower	Cambodia	112	28	2023	
78	Platinium Bay	Taiwan	112	32	2016	
79	The Parkway Residence 1	Taiwan	112	28	2020	
80	Bali Scenery 4	Indonesia	112	32	2016	
81	The Flora Condo	Taiwan	112	32	2018	
82	M Residence	Taiwan	111	36	2020	
83	R&F City Condominium	Taiwan	108.9	20 X 33	2021	
84	Beltei Group Headquarters	Cambodia	108.8	32	2025	
85	The Sky31	Taiwan	108	31	2018	
86	Novotel Hotel	France	107	28	2024	
87	PP City Center Tower	Hong Kong	106.4	2 X 28	2022	
	L Residence	Cambodia	106	32	2026	Topped Out
88	UK Condo Plaza	Cambodia	105.6	32	2023	
89	The Miro	Taiwan	105	32	2023	
90	Versailles Square	China	105	30	2024	
91	Crown Towers	Cambodia	105	30	2025	
92	Rose Condominium	Cambodia	105	2 X 28	2012	
93	The Parkway Residence 2	Taiwan	104	26	2020	
94	Xanadu Tower	China	104	30	2020	
95	AMASS Central Tower	Taiwan	104	26	2020	
96	Maritime Tower	Cambodia	104	26	2024	
	Morgan One	Hong Kong	103	30	2026	
97	Real Hope Condo	Taiwan	102.6	27	2023	
98	JD Polman Hotel & Residence	China	102.4	31	2025	
99	Baoli Mansion	Taiwan	102	28	2020	
100	Seven Residence	Taiwan	102	27	2022	
101	Lyve Inc Hotel	Cambodia	102	25	2019	
102	TV Tower 1	Cambodia	101.5	29	2024	
103	APD Bank	Cambodia	101.2	22	2025	
104	D.I Rivera A & B	China	100	2 X 28	2018	
105	Infinity Condominium	Taiwan	100	28	2018	
106	Royal Park Condominium	Taiwan	100	26	2020	
107	SH Condo	Taiwan	100	28	2021	
108	Phnom Penh City Garden	Cambodia	100	30	2022	
109	Diamond Home 2	Taiwan	100	31	2022	
110	Time Square 3	Taiwan	100	32	2022	
111	Royal Platinum Condominium	Taiwan	100	30	2023	
112	Time Square 2	Taiwan	100	30	2023	
	Crown Tower	Cambodia	100	30	2026	
	Royal Platinum	Cambodia	100	30	2025	
113	Residence H		100	27	2025	
113	Grand Mansion		100	25	2024	

== List under construction and approved buildings in Phnom Penh ==
This lists buildings that are under construction, approved and proposed.

Update 13 August 2026

Name	Investors	Height (m)	Floors	Notes
Phnom Penh Twin City Center		615	2 X 120	Proposal
Norea Tower		555	125	Proposal
Blueprint Twin Tower		498	2x104	Approved
Phom Penh Crystal Tower		475	128	Proposal
Mekong Quay Tower	Cambodia, China	430	90	Proposed
Phom Penh Business Tower		425	90	Proposal
Naga World 3 Tower	Cambodia, Malaysia, US	358	75	Under Construction
Phom Penh Glory		351	75	Proposal
The Ritz-Carlton Residences	Cambodia, United States	346.5	77	Proposed
Mekong Quay CiCC Tower	Cambodia, China	336	2x78	Proposed
J Tower 3	Japan	333	77	Under Construction
Morgan Enmaison 3	Hong Kong	331.2	72	Approved
G.A.T.O Tower	Cambodia, Japan	296	67	Under Construction
Mesong Tower 1	Hong Kong, Taiwan	269.8	71	On Hold
Marriott International	United States	268	64	Proposal
The Riverfront Tower	Hong Kong	265	3x64	Approved
Olympia Tower	Cambodia	260	65	Construction Soon
Titan Stone Financial Center	Taiwan	259	58	Approved
Naga World 3 Condo Hotel 1 & 2	Cambodia, Malaysia, US	256	2X61	On Hold
Morgan Champs Elysees Office	Hong Kong	240	60	Under Construction
Time Square 7	Taiwan	236	49	Under Construction
Royal Group Headquarters	Cambodia	235	47	Under Construction
Zion Tower	Taiwan	232.2	54	Approved
Royal Group Tower	Cambodia	230	48	Approved
Le Conde 2	Taiwan	226.8	63	Under Construction
Morgan Champs Elysees	Hong Kong	224	5x56	Under Construction
Sunwah Pearl	Hong Kong	223.2	2x62	Suspend
Time Square 8	Taiwan	215	50	Under Construction
GIA Norea Tower	Taiwan	214.8	50	Under construction
Royal Central	Cambodia	210	2 X 50	Under construction
R&F Glory	China	207.5	5x57	On-Hold
Mondial Center		204	2x51	Approved
Mesong Tower 2	Hong Kong, Taiwan	197.6	52	On Hold
Ultra Duplex Sky Mansion	Hong Kong	186.2	2x49	Approved
Picasso Sky Gemme (Picasso 2)	Taiwan	180	52	Under Construction
Olympia C6	Cambodia	180	45	Construction Soon
M Tower	China	175.9	43	Under Construction
Zion Residence	Taiwan	168	42	Under Construction
The Premier	Hong Kong	167.6	2x46	Under Construction
Mariott Phnom Penh Khou Tower	Cambodia	166	45	Under Constructions
Odom Tower	Cambodia	166	45	Under Construction
Urban Village Phase 3	Taiwan	166	2x41	Approved
Morgan Enmaison Tower 4&5	Hong Kong	164.5	2x47	Approved
Morgan Central Tower	Hong Kong	163.4	42	Under Construction
TPMG Tower	Taiwan,Cambodia	162	36	Proposed
Time Square 9	Taiwan	158	39	Under Construction
Time Square 11	Taiwan	156	39	Under Construction
The Wealth Tower	Taiwan, England	150	38	Under Construction
TV Tower II	Taiwan	148.2	39	Under Construction
White Swan Hotel	China	148	37	Under Constructions
Diamond Bay Garden	China	147	3x42	Under Constructions
Morgan Central Residence	Hong Kong	144.4	7x38	Under Construction
BBK 51 Residence	Cambodia	144.20	34	Under Construction
HNH Condo	Hong Kong	136.8	2x38	Under Construction
Morgan Business Center	Hong Kong	136	2x36	Under Construction
Mercure Hotel	Taiwan	133.2	36	Under Construction
EPC Complex	Hong Kong	133	35	Under Construction
Le Mia Apartment		132	33	Under Construction
Phnom Penh Harbour Residence		132	3x33	Under Construction
Kingston Royale	Cambodia	129.6	33	Under Construction
Citadel Manor	Cambodia	129.5	37	Under Construction
Norodom Business Tower	Cambodia	126	28	Under Construction
Yue Tai The Garden		126	8x36	Under Construction
Leedon Heights	Hong Kong	122.4	4x34	Under Construction
The Views II Residence	Japan	122.1	33	Under Construction
Morgan Central City	Hong Kong	115.2	15x32	Under Construction
L Tower 2	Cambodia	115	23	Under Construction
Citadines Leedon Phnom Penh		112	2x28	Proposed
Odom Residential	Cambodia	109.5	30	Under Construction
Yuetai Condo 2S		105.6	2x32	Under Construction
Lingnan Garden	China	105	8x33	Under Constructions
L Tower 3	Cambodia	104.4	29	Under Construction
Residence H		100	27	Under Constructions
Norea Square Condominiums		100	26	Under Constructions
Molyka Diamond Condo	Cambodia	104	26	Under Constructions
88 Suites	Taiwan	102	25	Under Constructions
Calmette Hospital		100	25	Under Construction
Sokimex Tower		100	23	Under Construction

== List of Sihanoukville completed or topped-out skyscrapers over 100 meters ==
This list (last updated April 2024) ranks the tallest completed skyscrapers in Sihanoukville, Cambodia

Rank	Name	Image	Height (m)	Floors	Year	Notes
1	The Seagate Suite		159	43	2022	Tallest building in Cambodia outside of Phnom Penh.
2	Prince Golden Bay		152	3X41	2022	
3	Blue Bay		142	42	2018	
4	Sunshine Bay Hotel		133	35	2020	
5	Fei Long Tower		129.6	36	2020	
6	Nanhai International Hotel		126	32	2019	
7	Star bay		115.5	6x33	2020	
8	Golden Sun Sky Casino & Hotel		110.2	29	2023	
9	Xihu International Hotel		100.8	28	2018	
10	D'Seaview		101	25	2020	
11	IT Prince Tower		100	27	2019	

== List of under-construction and Approved buildings in Sihanoukville ==
This lists (status May 2024) buildings that are under construction, approved, planned, proposed and Complete. Highrise and Supertall buildings Over 100m+ record all in Sihanoukville by Admin Page Phnom Penh Skyline.

Update 22 August 2025

Name	Image	Height (m)	Floors	Notes
Sihanoukville Star Bay Tower		596	116	Approved
Sihanoukville Financial Center		494	118	Approved
Le Meridian		261	58	Approved
Xin Hoa Skyline		200+	53	Approved
Lyon D'or Residence Tower		256	58	Approved
Prince Mega Mall & Hotel		180.6	42	Under Construction
Golden Bay Office Building		180	45	Under Construction
Prince Bay Tower		160	40	Approved
Peninsula Hotel & Resort		157.5	36	Under Construction
The Star Tower		150.5	4x43	Under Construction
The Seagate Suite		146	43	Under Construction
Victory Bay		136.5	39	Approved
Time Square 10		136.5	39	Under Construction
Royal Bay View		130 / 134	36/37	Under Construction
The Scarlet		128	32	Under Construction
HP Commercial Office		124	31	Under Construction
Shang Hai Bay		119	34	Under Construction
Sky-Mountain View twin		115	2x33	Under Construction
Morow Capital		112	28	Under Construction
Cloud Coast		108	27	Under Construction
Ocean City Condominium		108	31	Under Construction
Golden Bay Condominium		105	3x30	Under Construction
Star Bay4		105	30	Under Construction
JWM Casino & Hotel		105	20/30	Under Construction
Holiday Palace Tower		103.40	22	Under Construction
Seaside Resort Apartment		101.5	22/29	Under Construction
The Vincent Condo		100	27	Under Construction
La Tree Condominium		100	26	Under Construction
HP Commercial Resort		100	3x26	Under Construction

== Tallest under-construction, approved or proposed buildings in Kampot ==
This list (February 2019 status) of buildings that are under construction, approved, planned, proposed and completed. highrise and supertall buildings over 20fl record all in Kampot by Admin Page Phnom Penh Skyscraper.

Name	Image	Height (m)	Floors	Notes
TBR Twin Tower 1		142	41	On Hold by Covid-19 (2021)
TBR Twin Tower 2		136.5	39	On Hold by Covid-19 (2021)
