= ABOUTAsia Travel =

Cambodian travel company

- Industry: Travel
- Founded: 2008
- Founder: Andrew Booth
- Headquarters: Siem Reap, Cambodia
- Website: http://www.aboutasiatravel.com

ABOUTAsia Travel is a bespoke travel company specializing in responsible, sustainable travel throughout Cambodia and Southeast Asia, with its head offices in Siem Reap, Cambodia. The company was formed in 2008 by former international investment banker Andy Booth as a model of sustainable, responsible tourism in a developing country.

== History ==
On a family trip to Cambodia in 2003, Andy Booth learned that the majority of tour agencies operating in the country were based overseas, with only one in six tourist dollars spent in Cambodia remaining in-country and little economic benefit reaching the Khmer people. Convinced that tourism could be done in a sustainable fashion, Booth moved to Siem Reap, Cambodia in 2007 to develop a sustainable travel company with a philanthropic bent, in which the profits were donated to support rural public schools through partner non-profit, ABOUTAsia Schools; with the Cambodian government spending less than US$3 per student per year, ABOUTAsia Schools supplies "books, computers and other materials." In 2013, the foundation was supporting 108 Cambodian schools and over 53,000 students.

== Crowd Avoidance Research ==
Much has been written with regards to ABOUTAsia's 'crowd avoidance' research around the Angkor temples. The company routes its tours of Angkor Wat and the surrounding temples with proprietary research garnered with surveillance walks, footfall counts, and "surveys of pedestrian traffic patterns" to graph the number of visitors and keep travelers away from bus tours. According to Merope Mills of The Guardian, with over 2.5 million visitors to Cambodia every year ABOUTAsia's research is increasingly important for both conservation and visitor experience.

== The Angkor Guidebook Project ==
In 2014 ABOUTAsia released a new field guide to the Angkor temples, The Angkor Guidebook, written by ABOUTAsia CEO Andrew Booth. A team of historians was assembled by Booth in 2011, who together set out to answer the question of what the Angkor temples would have looked like in their prime. The book features innovative transparent overlays created by French artist Bruno Lévy to offer a travelers an impression of what the temples would have looked like in the 8th-14th centuries, as well as featuring never before-published photographs from the early part of the 20th century from École française d'Extrême-Orient; Booth spent 10 days searching through 25,000 images to display the state of ruin of the temples when they were discovered by Henri Mouhot. The Angkor Guidebook also offers information on ABOUTAsia's crowd avoidance research, including "practical information on how best to see the temples today, including how to escape the crowds."

== Awards and recognition ==
- Travel + Leisure Magazine's A-List: Top Travel Advisor for 2014
- Condé Nast Top Travel Specialist for Cambodia 2013
- Travel + Leisure Magazine's Global Vision Award Winner in the category of Community
- The PURE award for contribution to experiential travel - Andy Booth shortlisted top 6 most influential individuals
- in 2017 CEO Andrew Booth was awarded O.B.E. in recognition of his services to children's education in Cambodia
