= Vattanac Capital =

39-storey building in Phnom Penh, Cambodia

- វឌ្ឍនៈកាពីតាល
- View from Monivong Boulevard

- Location within Cambodia

General information
- Status: Completed
- Type: office
- Architectural style: ?
- Location: 66 Monivong Boulevard (93); Daun Penh, Phnom Penh
- Coordinates: 11.5734°N 104.9189°E
- Groundbreaking: ????
- Construction started: 2009
- Topped-out: 2012
- Completed: 2014
- Owner: Vattanac Properties Limited

Height
- Height: 187.3 m (615 ft)

Technical details
- Floor count: 39
- Lifts/elevators: 32

Design and construction
- Architect: TFP Farrells
- Developer: Vattanac Bank
- Engineer: Arup

Website
- www.vattanaccapital.com

Vattanac Capital (Khmer: វឌ្ឍនៈកាពីតាល) is a 187.3-metre (615 ft), 39-storey building in Phnom Penh, Cambodia. It is owned by Vattanac Properties Limited, an affiliate of the Vattanac Bank. Construction started in 2009 and the building topped out in May 2012. The majority of the building opened in 2014, while the hotel opened in 2018. The tower is the second skyscraper in Cambodia.

== Facilities ==
The tower is made up of 4 sections, the Vattanac Lifestyle Cube, the Vattanac Capital Mall, the Vattanac Capital Office Tower, and Rosewood Hotel Phnom Penh.

The tower houses the headquarters of The Vattanac Bank, a luxury hotel, serviced apartments, retail space, office space, a rooftop outdoor bar and a car park.

The lower floors are mostly used for luxury brand retail and an open expo space used for events and exhibitions. Notable retail available include an Eric Kaiser bakery, TWG Tea, a % Arabica cafe, Hugo Boss, Jimmy Choo, L'Occitane en Provence, POLO Ralph Lauren, Tiffany & Co and multiple other Luxury and higher end brands.

Office spaces reside between the hotel and shopping mall with one secluded entrance near the back of the building and an elevator in the mall leading upstairs. Both require and use an access card system for security and safety purposes.

Floors 25 through 39 house the Rosewood Phnom Penh Hotel, opened in 2018. The hotel is accessed in another secluded entrance and provides 148 rooms and 27 serviced apartments, as well as conference facilities, a fitness centre, a lobby lounge, a "sky bar", and a 20-metre swimming pool on the 33rd storey. The sky bar sits on a terrace which is cantilevered from the curving roofline of the tower.

== Design ==
The building was designed by TFP Farrells. The form of the tower was inspired by a dragon and incorporates feng shui and traditional Naga motifs. The construction manager and engineer was Arup. The LEED consultant is CO2nnsulting. The building has 30 high-speed Schindler lifts, as well as two Kone lifts.

== Awards ==
The building is LEED Gold certified and won the "Best Commercial Development (South East Asia)" award at the South East Asia Property Awards in Singapore in December 2012.

== Affiliates ==
- Vattanac Industrial Park
- Integrated Golf Resort
