= Sok Kong =

Khmero-Vietnamese businessman and founder of Sokimex

Lok Oknha Sok Kong
- សុខ គង់
- Born: 1948 (age 77–78); Prey Veng, Cambodia
- Organization: Sokimex
- Known for: Founder of The Sokimex Investment Group of Cambodia, one of the largest conglomerates in Cambodia. Sokimex Petroleum Stations, Sokha Hotels Group, Developing Bokor City
- Children: 6

Lok Oknha Sok Kong (Khmer: លោកឧកញ៉ា សុខ គង់; born in Prey Veng Province, Cambodia) is a Khmer-Vietnamese oligarch and founder of Sokimex, a petroleum company based in Cambodia. He is considered among Cambodia's two "most successful entrepreneurs" along with Kith Meng, but remains controversial for alleged connection to human rights violations, including human trafficking and the recent wave of cyber scams since 2019 within Cambodia.

== Biography ==
=== Early life ===
Kong has said that he was born to Vietnamese parents, in an area near the current Cambodian-Vietnamese border in 1951 or 1952. His education did not go beyond the third grade. In 1975, a man named Sok Kong who had joined the Khmer National Armed Forces was interviewed by The New York Times in the turmoil of the Cambodian Civil War, hitching a ride back to Phnom Penh from his post 20 miles to the northwest, telling the reporter: "The Americans have a good heart...[they] give all the equipment we need. But we don't get it. The big people take it all." It is unclear if this is the same Sok Kong.

In 1975, he fled from the Khmer Rouge to Vietnam, working on a farm in Đồng Tháp province and returned to Cambodia, after the Vietnamese dispelled the Khmer Rouge leadership.

=== Return to Cambodia ===
Sok Kong gave an interview in 2004 to a Vietnamese newspaper, where he discussed his early business career in the 1980s with an initial capital of US$100, which he used to "make a mold" to start making bicycle tires, and gradually expanded his operations, until he was supplying the People's Republic of Kampuchea with goods such as umbrellas and fabric, and rose to a position of intermediary in dealing Army tanks from Vietnam. From this, he expanded his venture into the petroleum sector, and was granted the right to administer Angkor Wat ticket sales.

=== Postwar years ===
After the Paris Peace Agreements, Kong was now able to rely on contacts to supply both the Cambodian army and UNTAC personnel with petrol and other supplies, rapidly increasing his wealth.

By 1990, his capital grew up to $100,000, after he was able to secure large profits from petroleum supply to the international peace mission to Cambodia. In 1994, he also opened a garment factory. Kong's wealth during this period exploded, so much so that within just a few years he was a multi-millionaire. In 1996, some confusion surrounds the conditions of Kong's acquisition of state-owned assets, in the form of gasoline storage stations. Sokimex purchased the state-owned oil company Compagnie Kampuchea des Carburants for $10.6 million and took over its fuel storage in Phnom Penh and Sihanoukville, allowing him to control the main port of Sihanoukville. Kong stated in an interview that: "we offered more money than other companies for them because we saw the potential... ....another company owned the concession for a long time and did nothing... ...They may say that I am corrupt. But it was I who took the risk." The petroleum sector wrangling continued when Cambodia opened up its market to international players including Shell and Caltex, but according to opposition figures Sokimex used its infrastructural and political advantages to avoid paying scheduled taxation rates, whilst charging competitors to pump petroleum products ashore.

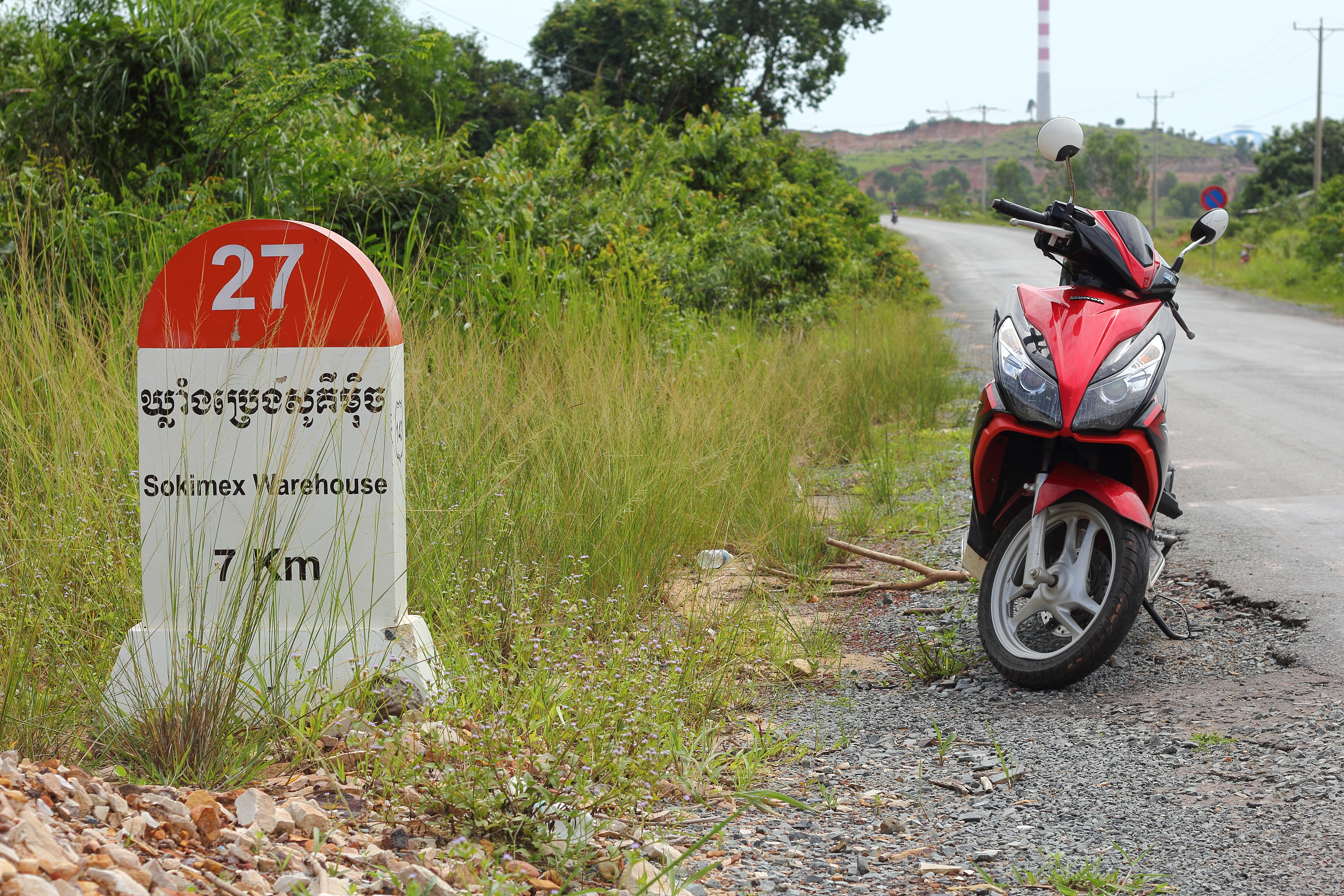
Sokimex Warehouse: in 1992 when the UNTAC came in, Sok Kong was supplying oil to the Khmer government, and when the international presence started ordering from him, contracts were so many that he did not have any warehouse left with storage.

Kong played a key role supporting then Second Prime Minister Hun Sen during the 1997 Cambodian coup d'état, when Kong sided with the long-time dictator to provide the factions of the military that were aligned with the junior government coalition Cambodian People's Party with gasoline.

After gaining his crucial support for the coup, Hun Sen either stripped the license from another importer Duong Chhiv from the contract he had obtained in 1996 to be the sole supplier of medicine and health care products to the military, or merely failed to renew the contract in favor of giving it to Kong.

In 1999, Sok Kong acquired the ticketing rights to Angkor Wat.

=== Business expansion ===
Sok Kong continued to develop Sokimex with his brother Sok Vanna, and in close relation with the Cambodian government. In 2000, opposition leader Sam Rainsy accused Sokimex of being set up with the support of the Vietnamese invading army and that it became the financial pillar for the ruling CPP, thus enjoying unfair advantages over its competition.

Until October 2007, Sok Kong and Teng Bunma controlled the Cambodian Chamber of Commerce, which he headed from 2002 to 2005, until they chose Kith Meng, with no dissenting votes, as their direct successor.

By 2008, Sok Kong had diversified into the tourism industry, garment factories, housing developments and even a helicopter company, but he decided to shift his investment priority to tourism and hotels.

In 2008, Sok Kong was confirmed as the new owner of the lion's share of Occheuteal Beach, the largest and most popular public dune in the region of Sihanoukville.

On 25 January 2022, Sok Kong announced to build a road connecting National Road 4 to Bokor Mountain with a length of about 27 kilometers. He also announced his intention to sell Sokha Hotel Phnom Penh and surrounding areas in Chroy Changvar for $1.5 billion and allocate that money to further develop Bokor's Thansur Sokha Hotel and pay off debts.

== Controversies ==
=== Business practises ===
Sok Kong has been widely criticized for his business practises since the 1980s, though he questions his critics, wondering if anyone would have taken the risk that he dared to take at that time. Since then, Sok Kong has promoted better business practises: since becoming President of the Phnom Penh Chamber of Commerce for example, he signed the statement on corporate governance by the Confederation of Asia-Pacific Chambers of Commerce and Industry.

He has criticized the impunity of certain oknha and has called for equal treatment before justice:

Okhna and normal people are the same ... if they do something wrong they will face the court.

— Sok Kong

=== Angkor controversy ===
The main opposition political party at the time led by Kem Sokha and Sam Rainsy, co-leaders of the now dissolved Cambodia National Rescue Party, accused APSARA the body that overseas the Angkor Archaeological Park, of underreporting revenue in order to benefit Sok Kong. In March 2012, an anonymous group filed a corruption complaint with the country's Anti-Corruption Unit, accusing Sokimex of siphoning off most of the ticket revenue and calling the contract between the government and the company “irregular,” but Bun Narith, Apsara's general director, dismissed the allegations as baseless. In May 2017, senior opposition lawmaker Son Chhay called once again for a review of government spending on Apsara, in link with its dealings with Sok Kong.

Sok Kong's supporters claim he has invested millions in order to develop the attractiveness of Siem Reap to foreign tourists, that his activities included many charitable contributions to the area, and that he built public restrooms, repaired roads, and developed businesses from luxury hotels to a hot air balloon.

=== Environmental issues ===
While many environmentalists have voiced criticism against developments promoted by Sok Kong, the latter as stated his commitment to protecting the natural beauty and envioment of Cambodia and asserts that "the real challenge is the environment”, further saying that:

We as investors have to consider the environment – that is in everyone's interest. If the government or companies do not protect [the environment] then we will all suffer.

— Sok Kong

== Family ==
Sok Kong is married and is the father of six children, three boys and three girls.

== See also ==
- APSARA
