= Sokimex =

Cambodian holding company

Sokimex (or SOKIMEX) (Sok Kong Import Export Company) is a company based in Cambodia. The company is involved in petroleum product import, infrastructure development, hotel management, and an airline.

== History ==
Sokimex was founded in 1990 by Oknha Sok Kong, an ethnic Vietnamese Cambodian businessman. The main offices are located in Phnom Penh.

The Sokha Hotel Group opened the Sokha Beach Resort in Sihanoukville on 8 April 2004, followed by the opening of Sokha Angkor Resort in Siem Reap on 8 December 2005. Sokha Club hotel is a boutique hotel opened in Phnom Penh on 28 August 2008. Thansur Bokor Highland Resort is affiliated with Sokha Hotel opened in Kampot on 3 May 2011.

Sokimex also used to run the Angkor World Heritage Site.
