= Cambodia Asia Bank =

Cambodia Asia Bank (CAB) Bank is a commercial bank headquartered in Phnom Penh, Cambodia. It commenced operations on February 23, 1993 and offers banking and financial services. The bank operates a dozen branch offices. CAB offers loan, savings account, foreign remittance and other financial services.
