= Vattanac Bank =

Retail and commercial bank of Cambodia

The Vattanac Bank (Khmer: ធនាគារវឌ្ឍនៈ) is a retail and commercial bank in Cambodia.

== History ==
Vattanac Bank started operations on 8 November 2002 and is based in the capital Phnom Penh. As of 2026, the bank has 41 branches, with 15 in the capital and 26 in the provinces: Siem Reap, Battambang, Pursat, Takéo, and Kampong Speu. The bank also developed Vattanac Capital, Cambodia's first skyscraper.
