= Oknha =

Khmer honorific

Oknha (Khmer: ឧកញ៉ា, Ŏknha [ʔok.ɲaː]) is a Khmer honorific. It has different meanings depending on the period it was used.

== Linguistics ==
The word means "nobleman" or "lord".

The translation of "Oknha" is not unanimous. Leaning on the meaning of Vietnamese title "Quốc công", some have translated the title of oknha as "Duke" while some others favour the more mercantile version of tycoon.

== History ==
=== Oknha: the royal envoy of the Khmer Empire ===
In premodern times, Oknha were envoys appointed by the king, who were expected to perform a wide variety of duties, take elaborate oaths of loyalty, and present the monarch with regular gifts. Oknha was one of the noble titles, above Preah (ព្រះ [prĕəh]) and below Neak Oknha (អ្នកឧកញ៉ា [nĕəʔ ʔokɲaː]).

The term is used as such in modern Khmer inscriptions found in Angkor, such inscription IMA 9 dating back to 1539 and recalling the good deeds of "uk-na Samarasangram".

=== Royal title created by the Oudong monarchy (17th–19th century) ===
The title Oknha was used during the 18th century to replace the title Ponhea (ពញា [pɔɲiə]), which could be translated as Phraya (พญา) in Thai. The title "Oknha" was transformed into Thai as Okya (ออกญา) by the Ayutthaya Kingdom. The word Oknha is referred to as Ốc nha (屋牙) in ancient Vietnamese records.

Oknha Yomreach was a Cambodian officer, who played an important role in Cambodian politics in the late 18th century, fighting against the Vietnamese, the Cham and eventually becoming a governor under Siamese suzerainty.

In 1859, Oknha Ponhea Him, a prominent and influential person, known as Tuan Him in both Khmer and Cham sources, rose in rebellion against King Ang Duong, uniting more than a thousand Chams and Malays against the king.

=== Modern title for the new elite of Cambodia: (1993–present) ===
Since the reestablishment of the monarchy in Cambodia in 1993, Oknha has been restored as the highest title bestowed on civilians, exclusively non-royalty, by the Cambodian king.

Since 2010, the increase in the number of Oknhas has reflected the growing prosperity of a fortunate segment of Cambodia's population.

With a growing number of title-holders have come a growing number of scandals linked to various Oknha, often criticized for using their influence to avoid justice.

In August 2019, Prime Minister Hun Sen ordered members of the military and police forces who hold the honorary Oknha title to choose between their state positions or private titles in a bid to maintain the good reputation of the government; the majority of them decided to give up their tycoon titles and continue to serve the Khmer nation.

While some Oknhas have broken the news with scandal ranging from rape to land grabbing and picking on ethnic minorities, many others continue to display a great generosity, as in helping to provide vaccines during the coronavirus epidemic through significant donations.

Today, the Chamber of Commerce of Phnom Penh is known as the Oknha Club. Scholars have described the politics of awarding and receiving the Oknha title as an "elite pact", an expression of the reciprocal relationship between the Cambodian business elite and the Cambodian People's Party leadership, while others have seen it as a positive recognition of the emergence of new Cambodian leadership after many years of civil war and foreign intrusion.

The Cambodian Oknha Association (COA) was legally registered with the Ministry of Interior on 25 October 2022. It aims to maintain and enhance the supremacy of the title of Oknha and join the Royal Government in the country's socio-economic development, and social and humanitarian activities. In 2021, the Cambodian government prescribed a uniform for Oknhas to wear on ceremonial occasions.

== Process of election ==
While appointing oknhas was a royal tradition of the king, this process is now almost extinct and has only been used three or four times since the restoration of monarchy in 1992, according to Prince Sisowath Thomico, a longtime secretary to the late King Father Norodom Sihanouk and former adviser to King Norodom Sihamoni.

By a decree promulgated in from April 1994, wealthy benefactors who gave at least $100,000 to the government and directed their money toward initiatives to help society can obtain the title of Okhna this way.

In April 2017, Prime Minister Hun Sen issued a new sub-decree raising the minimum donation required to receive the honorific title of Oknha from $100,000 to $500,000.

Prior to receiving the title, a recipient must take an oath pledging to be a citizen of servitude and commit to do honest work for the King. The worthy candidates then receive a first class Sathapana Cheat medal, often in the Royal Order of Monisaraphon, from the King and the royally-bestowed title of Oknha. Among other privileges, an "Okhna" usually benefits from official tax exemptions and informal authority within the Khmer society.

== Nomenclature and hierarchy ==
There are three levels of Oknha: Oknha, Neak Oknha (អ្នកឧកញ៉ា [neak ʔok.ɲaː]) and Louk Neak Oknha (លោកអ្នកឧកញ៉ា [loːk neak ʔok.ɲaː]).

== Famous Oknhas ==
According to estimates, 200 people held the title in 2008, and at least 700 people held the title in 2017, compared to about five before 1975.

In a 2015 paper, Teng Bunma was described as the prototype of the new Khmer oknha by Michiel Verver and Heidi Schnetzinger who explained the "elite pact" between the business and political elites through the oknha system of Cambodia.

The vast majority of Oknha are Khmer-born and rare are the examples of naturalized Khmer, such as Paul Blanche-Horgan, who receive the title.

Louk Oknha Suttantaprija Ind was a Khmer monk, writer and famous poet of the 20th century during the French protectorate of Cambodia. His royal title, "Oknha" or "Lord" in English, was bestowed upon him by the King of Cambodia due to his extensive works in helping to preserve Khmer literature, his writings and his poetry skills.

== See also ==
- Social class in Cambodia
- Khmer nobility
- Cambodian royal and noble titles
- Samdech
- Lord
