= Leopard Capital =

Private equity fund manager

Leopard Capital LP
- Company type: Limited partnership
- Industry: Private equity
- Founded: 2007; 19 years ago
- Founder: Douglas W. Clayton
- Headquarters: Phnom Penh, Cambodia, Port-au-Prince, Haiti
- Products: Private equity funds, Growth capital, Venture capital
- Number of employees: 15

Leopard Capital LP is a private equity fund manager specializing in frontier market investments. The Group is considered a pioneer investor in Southeast Asia’s Greater Mekong Subregion and the Caribbean.

== Structure and key personnel ==
Leopard Capital is a Cayman domiciled frontier market investment group established in 2007 by current CEO Douglas Clayton. Leopard recruited various renowned investors such as Dr. Jim Walker to serve as directors and shareholders.
