= List of water supply and sanitation by country =

This list of water supply and sanitation by country provides information on the status of water supply and sanitation at a national or, in some cases, also regional level.

== Water supply and sanitation by country ==
- Water supply and sanitation in Afghanistan
- Water supply and sanitation in Algeria
- Water supply and sanitation in Argentina
- Water supply and sanitation in Australia
- Water supply and sanitation in Bangladesh
- Water supply and sanitation in Belgium
- Water supply and sanitation in Benin
- Water supply and sanitation in Bolivia
- Water supply and sanitation in Brazil
- Water supply and sanitation in Burkina Faso
- Water supply and sanitation in Cambodia
- Water supply and sanitation in Canada
- Water supply and sanitation in Chile
- Water supply and sanitation in China
- Water supply and sanitation in Colombia
- Water supply and sanitation in Costa Rica
- Water supply and sanitation in Cuba
- Water supply and sanitation in Denmark
- Water supply and sanitation in the Dominican Republic
- Water supply and sanitation in Ecuador
- Water supply and sanitation in Egypt
- Water supply and sanitation in El Salvador
- Water supply and sanitation in England
- Water supply and sanitation in Ethiopia
- Water supply and sanitation in France
- Water supply and sanitation in Germany
- Water supply and sanitation in Ghana
- Water supply and sanitation in Gibraltar
- Water supply and sanitation in Greece
- Water supply and sanitation in Guatemala
- Water supply and sanitation in Guyana
- Water supply and sanitation in Haiti
- Water supply and sanitation in Honduras
- Water supply and sanitation in Hong Kong
- Water supply and sanitation in India
- Water supply and sanitation in Indonesia
- Water supply and sanitation in Iran
- Water supply and sanitation in Iraq
- Water supply and sanitation in the Republic of Ireland
- Water supply and sanitation in Israel
- Water supply and sanitation in Italy
- Water supply and sanitation in Jamaica
- Water supply and sanitation in Japan
- Water supply and sanitation in Jordan
- Water supply and sanitation in Kenya
- Water supply and sanitation in Lebanon
- Water supply and sanitation in Malaysia
- Water supply and sanitation in Mexico
- Water supply and sanitation in Morocco
- Water supply and sanitation in Mozambique
- Water supply and sanitation in Namibia
- Water supply and sanitation in the Netherlands
- Water supply and sanitation in New Zealand
- Water supply and sanitation in Nicaragua
- Water supply and sanitation in Nigeria
- Water supply and sanitation in Pakistan
- Water supply and sanitation in the Palestinian territories
- Water supply and sanitation in Panama
- Water supply and sanitation in Paraguay
- Water supply and sanitation in Peru
- Water supply and sanitation in the Philippines
- Water supply and sanitation in Portugal
- Water supply and sanitation in Russia
- Water supply and sanitation in Rwanda
- Water supply and sanitation in Saudi Arabia
- Water supply and sanitation in Scotland
- Water supply and sanitation in Senegal
- Water supply and sanitation in Sierra Leone
- Water supply and sanitation in Singapore
- Water supply and sanitation in South Africa
- Water supply and sanitation in South Sudan
- Water supply and sanitation in Spain
- Water supply and sanitation in Syria
- Water supply and sanitation in Tanzania
- Water supply and sanitation in Trinidad and Tobago
- Water supply and sanitation in Tunisia
- Water supply and sanitation in Turkey
- Water supply and sanitation in Uganda
- Water supply and sanitation in the United Kingdom
- Water supply and sanitation in the United States
- Water supply and sanitation in Uruguay
- Water supply and sanitation in Venezuela
- Water supply and sanitation in Vietnam
- Water supply and sanitation in Wales
- Water supply and sanitation in Yemen
- Water supply and sanitation in Zambia
- Water supply and sanitation in Zimbabwe

== Lists by region ==
- Water supply and sanitation in the European Union
- Water supply and sanitation in Latin America
- Water supply and sanitation in Sub-Saharan Africa
- List of responsibilities in the water supply and sanitation sector in Latin America and the Caribbean

== List of water resource management by country ==
This list of water resources management by country provides information on the status of water resource management at a national level.

List by country:

- Water resources management in Argentina
- Water resources management in Brazil
- Water resources management in Chile
- Water resources management in Colombia
- Water resources management in Costa Rica
- Water resources management in the Dominican Republic
- Water resources management in modern Egypt
- Water resources management in El Salvador
- Water resources management in Guatemala
- Water resources management in Honduras
- Water resources management in Jamaica
- Water resources management in Mexico
- Water resources management in Nicaragua
- Water resources management in Pakistan
- Water resources management in Peru
- Water resources management in Syria
- Water resources management in Uruguay

== See also ==
- List of countries by access to clean water
- List of countries by proportion of the population using improved sanitation facilities
- List of abbreviations used in sanitation
- Sanitation
- Water supply
