= Water supply and sanitation in Latin America =

Water supply and sanitation in Latin America is characterized by insufficient access and in many cases by poor service quality, with detrimental impacts on public health. Water and sanitation services are provided by a vast array of mostly local service providers under an often fragmented policy and regulatory framework. Financing of water and sanitation remains a serious challenge.

== Access ==
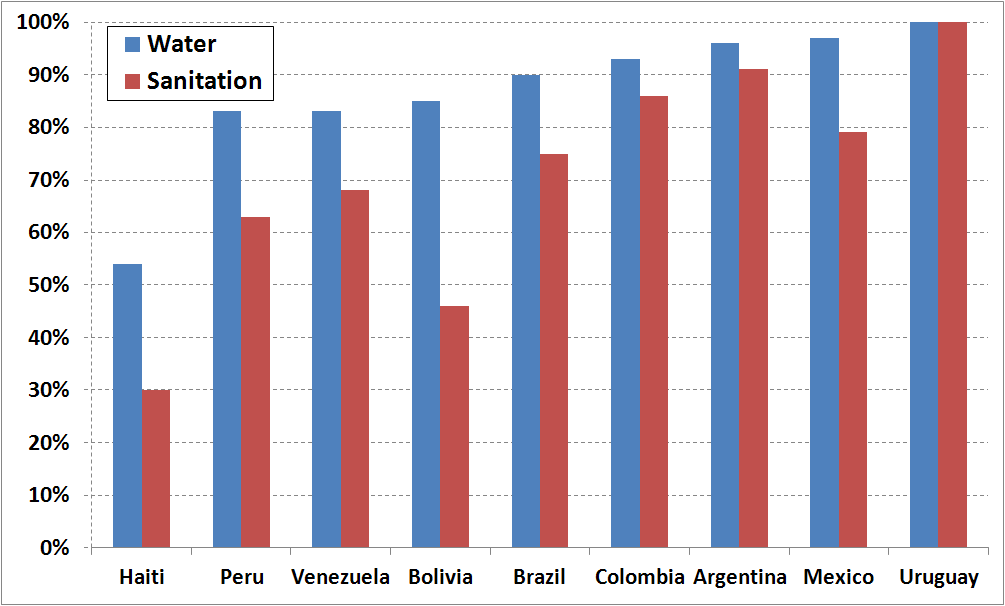
Water and Sanitation Coverage (broad definition) in selected Latin American countries in 2004. Source: World Health Organization (WHO)/UNICEF (2006): Meeting the MDG drinking water and sanitation target: the urban and rural challenge of the decade.

Access to water and sanitation remains insufficient, in particular in rural areas and for the poor. It also differs substantially among and within countries. According to the Joint Monitoring Program of the World Health Organization and UNICEF, in 2004 the share of the population which was connected to an improved water source varied from 54% in Haiti to 100% in Uruguay. Altogether, 50 million people, or 9% of the population of Latin America and the Caribbean did not have access to improved water supply, and 125 million or 23% did not have access to improved sanitation. Increasing access remains a challenge, in particular given the poor financial health of service providers and fiscal constraints on behalf of central and local governments. After the Mediterranean, the Caribbean Sea is the second most polluted sea. Pollution (in the form of up to 300,000 tonnes of solid garbage dumped into the Caribbean Sea each year) is progressively endangering marine ecosystems, wiping out species, and harming the livelihoods of the local people, which is primarily reliant on tourism and fishing.

As far as sanitation is concerned, only 51% of the population has access to sewers. Only an estimated 15% of the collected wastewater finds its way into wastewater treatment plants, which often are not properly functioning. 26% of the population has access to forms of sanitation other than sewers, including septic tanks and various types of latrines. Many scholars have found that while 20% of potable water is effectively treated in Latin America, there is sufficient infrastructure to treat 30% to 35% of water.

== Water use ==
The per capita water use in Latin America varies greatly among countries, among cities in the same country, and between urban and rural areas, and obviously among those with a house connection, a public tap or no improved water source at all. The average net urban water use (i.e. excluding distribution losses) was estimated at 240 liter/capita/day, a level that is about as high as in the United States and almost twice as high as in Central Europe. The highest water use can be found in some utilities in Brazil and Argentina, where water resources are abundant and water use is almost 500 liter/capita/day. The lowest water use is in Aguas de Illimani serving La Paz, the capital of Bolivia, with less than 50 liter/capita/day. In rural areas water use is sometimes even lower than this level.

== Health Effects ==
Studies in Latin American cities have shown that consuming water that has not been treated with adequate sanitation services introduces many human health issues to the public, especially to residents of poor and informal settlements. Low-income urban residents consuming polluted water are more likely to become ill with "poverty diseases" such as gastrointestinal and infectious water-borne diseases, as well as chronic diseases that degrade human health over time. Consumption of contaminated water and lack of access to clean water are also associated with health disorders that stem from emotional and physical stress and water-use conflicts. One of the most notable disease outbreaks in Latin America was the region's 1991-1993 cholera epidemic.

One study in the shantytowns of Lima, Peru reported that approximately 15% of these poor settlements have in-house water provisions, which forces these residents to obtain water from informal water vendors not administered by local governments or utility companies. The quality of this water is unhealthy, their origin and state of sanitization is unclear, and this water has reportedly contained visible contaminants. Coupled with unsanitary storage tanks that further contaminate this water, water-borne gastrointestinal diseases affected 22% of this poor urban population at the time of the study. Other studies in Argentina have reported that formal provisions of potable water by municipal governments have been found to contain dangerous levels of contaminants and bacteria. 10% of the country's population are exposed to consuming arsenic found in the water they consume, principally in areas that lack water treatment infrastructure.

== Quality of service ==
Even for those having access to water supply, poor quality of service is often experienced, in the form of intermittent supply, low pressure and poor drinking water quality. However, differences in service quality between countries and between cities in Latin America are vast, and some service providers achieve a quality of service on par with developed countries.

== Institutional responsibility ==
See also List of responsibilities in the water supply and sanitation sector in Latin America and the Caribbean

=== Service provision ===
Responsibility for water supply and sewerage service provision in Latin American countries is vested either in municipalities, or in regional or national companies. Municipalities are in charge of water and sanitation service provision in Brazil, Colombia, Ecuador, Guatemala, Mexico and Peru. In some countries, such as in Colombia and Mexico, municipalities took over this responsibility from national service providers during the decentralization of the 1980s. Subsequently, especially the larger municipalities have often created specialized municipal (and sometimes inter-municipal) public utilities, whose finances are kept separate from the city's finances. While in most cases the companies are public, in a few notable cases they are mixed or private companies operating under concession, lease or management contracts. Chile and Venezuela are examples of countries that have created regional water companies; however, in the case of Venezuela, the United Nations reports that Venezuela remains one of the poorest in water service provision in this region. State-level regional water companies also exist in all 26 states of Brazil, where they provide services on behalf of some (but not all) municipalities in each state. National public water and sewer companies, which have for the most part been created in the 1960s and 1970s, still exist in Costa Rica, the Dominican Republic, El Salvador, Haiti, Panama, Paraguay and Uruguay. About 90% of urban water and sanitation services in Latin America are provided by public entities. Many private concession contracts signed during the 1990s in Latin America have been either renegotiated or cancelled. The most notable cancellations include the concession for Aguas Argentinas in Buenos Aires, Argentina, and the concessions for Cochabamba and La Paz, Bolivia. Private and mixed companies, however, continue to provide services in many cities of Colombia, in most of Chile, some Brazilian cities, and in Guayaquil, Ecuador.

In rural areas, the provision of water services is usually the responsibility of community organizations (Juntas de Agua). While the infrastructure is funded primarily by transfers from the national governments, typically community labor and sometimes cash contributions are mobilized. When communities are associated in the choice of service level and other key choices, this instills a sense of ownership that makes it more likely that communities will maintain the infrastructure.

=== Policy and regulation ===
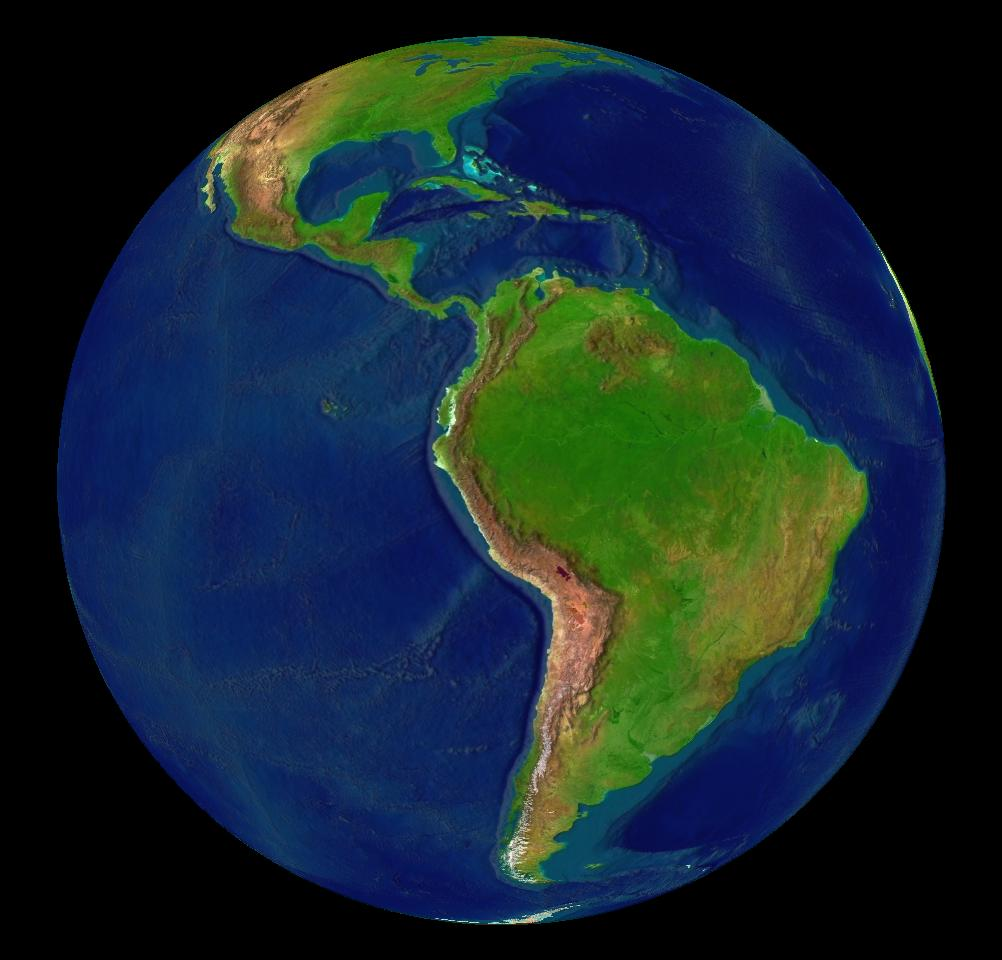
A terrain map of Latin America

At the level of national governments, responsibility for policies in water and sanitation is typically fragmented between various Ministries, making the development of coherent policies in areas such as transfers to local service providers a challenging undertaking. The economic regulation of service providers is sometimes entrusted to Ministries and sometimes to autonomous regulatory agencies. These agencies sometimes cover only water and sanitation or multiple infrastructure sectors; they can be either at the national (as in Chile, Colombia and Peru) or at the state level (as in Argentina and in some states of Mexico). Their functions vary and may include tariff approvals, monitoring of service quality and handling of complaints. Environmental regulation is entrusted to environmental agencies and the regulation of drinking water quality to Ministries of Health.

=== Supporting community organizations ===
Supporting the numerous community organizations that provide water and sanitation services in Latin America – mainly in rural areas – is a key public function that is often underestimated and neglected. Responsibility for this function, if it is defined at all, can be assigned to a government Ministry and its regional branches, a Social Fund or municipalities. Often NGOs also carry out this function, either on their own initiative and with their own resources, or under contract by the government.

In Honduras support to community organizations (Juntas de Agua) is entrusted to the Social Fund FHIS, in cooperation with a national agency for technical assistance in water and sanitation (SANAA). In El Salvador it is done by the Social Fund FISDL and various NGOs. In Peru it is carried out through NGOs and municipalities with the support of a national program (PRONASAR) implemented by the Ministry of Housing. In Paraguay it is the responsibility of a national agency in charge of promoting specifically water supply and sanitation in rural areas and small towns (SENASA). In Ecuador it is carried out under a national program (PRAGUAS) by consultants working for the Ministry of Housing. In Panama such support is provided by the Ministry of Health. In Haiti such support is provided by NGOs, some of which are under contract with the national urban water agency SNEP and its specialized unit for rural areas. There thus is a wide variety of institutional arrangements to support community organizations, so that one cannot speak of a uniform model for such support in Latin America.

== Financial aspects ==
=== Tariffs ===
According to a 2006 World Bank study average water tariffs in Latin America are the highest of any region of the developing world. Tariffs are about four times higher than in South Asia, three times higher than in Eastern Europe and Central Asia and almost twice as high as in East Asia. However, tariffs are less than half as high as in OECD countries. Based on a sample of 23 major cities in Latin America the average residential water tariff for a monthly consumption of 15 cubic meter was US$0.41, equivalent to a monthly bill of only about US$6.

=== Cost recovery ===
It appears that most utilities in Latin America recover more than their operating costs and thus generate surpluses to self-finance a portion of their investments. The average recovery coefficient of operating costs among a sample of 48 private and public utilities from 8 countries was 1.64. The highest coefficients of more than 2 can be found in utilities in Chile, as well as in Pereira and Manizales in Colombia.

Despite the ostensibly high levels of tariffs and cost recovery estimated based on the sample of utilities analyzed, utilities do not generate sufficient revenue to finance a substantial share of their investments internally, or to be credit-worthy enough to mobilize commercial, long-term credit. The reasons include low levels of operational efficiency, as detailed further below, poor recovery of bills, poor procurement practices and political corruption.

=== Affordability ===
There are few studies on the affordability of water and sewer bills in Latin America. The Pan-American Health Organization (PAHO) analyzed multi-purpose household surveys conducted between 1995 and 1999 in 10 countries to assess the share of household income spent on water supply services. These data show that the expenditures on water vary from 0.4% of total expenditures in rural Panama to 3.0% in Kingston, Jamaica. For the households in the poorest income decile expenditures on water are higher, varying from 0.6% in rural Panama to 6.5% in Kingston, Jamaica. However, these figures have to be interpreted with caution. First, it is not clear how water expenditures were defined in the surveys. It seems that in some cases expenditures to buy bottled water and water from tankers were included, while in other cases they were excluded. Second, the sample includes both households with and without access to piped water systems. Therefore, especially in rural areas where coverage tends to be low, the shares are only a poor indication on the affordability of water bills. Third, it is not explicit if sewer bills are included in the analysis, although this is most likely the case, since sewer bills are always a surcharge on the water bill and are thus perceived by most households as part of their water expenditures.

=== Investment ===
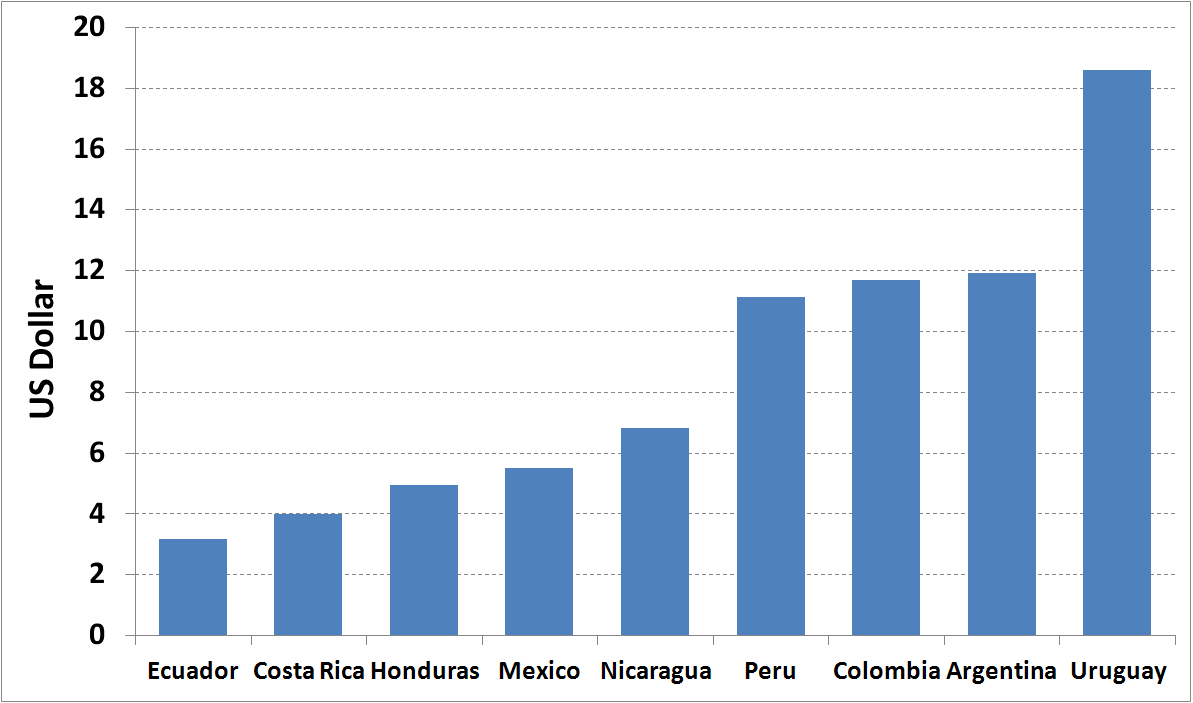
Annual investment per capita in several Latin American countries in water supply and sanitation (1997-2003 average) in constant US Dollars of 2006

The level of investment in water supply and sanitation in Latin America is tentatively estimated at 0.12% of GDP in the 1990s. A large share of these investments is needed to maintain and rehabilitate existing infrastructure. However, the World Bank has estimated that the investments needed to increase access to achieve the Millennium Development Goals (MDGs) in water and sanitation in Latin America by itself is 0.12% of GDP, not taking into account maintenance and rehabilitation. It can thus be concluded that, on average, a significant increase in investments is needed to achieve the MDGs.

KfW has provided a €25.7 million funding agreement to eliminate marine trash and boost the circular economy in the Caribbean's Small Island Developing States. The project will assist remove solid waste and keep it out of the marine and coastal environment by establishing a new facility under the Caribbean Biodiversity Fund (CBF).

=== Financing ===
The modalities of financing water and sanitation infrastructure differ substantially between countries. Some countries that have reached higher levels of cost recovery, such as Chile and some utilities in Brazil and Mexico, rely on commercial credit financing. However, the vast majority of utilities relies on transfers from national governments. These can take various forms: In Colombia municipalities are legally entitled to receive transfers calculated through a formula based on their costs and poverty levels; in Mexico municipalities can apply for matching federal grants provided they fulfill certain conditions that vary by program; in Ecuador municipalities receive transfers based on a formula that takes into account their choice of management model and improvements in cost recovery; and in other countries utilities simply receive transfers that can vary from one year to the other without any conditions. The level of transfers from national governments is highly variable and often far from sufficient to increase coverage and improve service quality. Some countries pass loans from international financial institutions on to utilities in the form of credits. However, these international loans only account for a relatively small share of water and sanitation financing in Latin America.

== Efficiency ==
There are wide differences in the operational efficiency among urban water and sanitation utilities in Latin America. The two most common measures of operation efficiency are labor productivity and non-revenue water (water losses). In terms of labor productivity, the most productive utilities have less than 2 employees per 1000 connections. They include EPM in Colombia, SEDAPAL in Lima, Aguas del Valle in Chile's 4th region, as well as Aguas de Formosa and Aguas de Salta in Argentina. The utility with the lowest labor productivity in the sample is EPSEL from the Lambayeque Region in Peru with more than 15 employees per 1000 connections. The average of the sample is about 5 employees per 1000 connections.

Concerning non-revenue water, the average of Latin American utilities in the sample considered is 40% and thus much higher than estimates of efficient levels, which vary between 15 and 25%. The highest level (73%) is registered by Interagua, the utility serving Guayaquil in Ecuador. The lowest level of any larger utility with a high share of household metering, which is a precondition to accurately measure non-revenue water, is registered in Aguas Cordillera in Chile with 20%.

== Comparing rural and urban populations ==
There is a significant disparity in access to water and sanitation services between the rural and urban populations of Latin America. While there are inequities to water services between low- and high-income households in Latin American cities, urban regions often receive better water supply and sanitation services because of better political recognition, much greater population, and more developed infrastructure than rural communities. A study of households in eleven countries in the region between 1995 and 1999 showed that while 86.7% of the surveyed urban population had access to in-home drinking water, only 37.64% of the rural population had this service.

Similarly, 7.02% of urban households lacked any water supply services, while 38.78% of the rural population did. There is a significant gap in access to clean water in Latin America between rural and urban regions: 26 million urban residents lacked any water supply services, compared to 51 million rural residents who lacked this. The study did show, however, that 23.58% of rural households had easy access to potable water, while only 6.28% of urban households did.

What is true for both rural and urban populations in Latin America is that poor households always pay more, in proportional terms, than wealthy households to obtain potable water. This increased cost that poor households are burdened by is combined with the fact that they must also pay more for medical treatment from drinking contaminated water and may spend hours to retrieve water from distance sources.

== Strategy to improve services ==
The Millennium Development Goals (MDG) aim at halving, by 2015, the proportion of people without sustainable access to safe drinking water and adequate sanitation, from a base year of 1990. According to a 2006 World Bank brief, this is achievable for some countries in Latin America and the Caribbean, while it represents a mammoth task for others. According to the World Bank even those countries on track to achieve the MDG targets face tremendous challenges in improving service quality, in particular to attain continuity of supply and to increase wastewater treatment. To meet these challenges Latin American and Caribbean countries, according to the World Bank, would have to advance on several fronts, including:

- Improving the efficiency of service providers to allow them to generate more internal resources to cover costs and fund investment. This includes better collection of bills, reduction of administrative losses (clandestine connections, under-metering) and physical losses, better procurement practices, the use of low-cost technologies and a reduction of overstaffing.
- Increasing investments in water and sanitation. Many scholars cite the 2011 report by the Development Bank of Latin America that Latin America could close its water infrastructure gap by 2030 if its countries invest 0.31% of 2010 GDP to the water sector. All of the countries’ annual investments of 0.31% of 2010 GDP - which is considered feasible by scholars - could reduce the infrastructure gap among households to access basic clean water services.
- Introducing innovative mechanisms for commercial financing. This includes tapping domestic capital markets where feasible and the judicious use of guarantees and guarantee facilities, while managing contingent liabilities prudently.
- Targeting subsidies better and improving cost recovery. Implicit and explicit subsidies through low tariffs mostly benefit the better-off. Increasing tariffs is often a necessity. But in order to make this more equitable, such measures would have to be complemented by actions to enhance collection efficiency, reduce the incidence of illegal connections, increase the share of metered connections (see water meters), revise tariff structures and introduce means-tested subsidies where feasible.
- Expanding access to water and sanitation services, especially to the poor, while ensuring that these services are accessible, efficient, and sustainable. Low-cost technologies such as condominial sewers can play an important role in that respect, as can legalizing land tenure and finding innovative ways to provide services to those without land titles.
- Improving service quality. Without continuous supply, reliably good drinking water quality, and the prevention of sewer overflows, public health is endangered – especially if customer service is poor and billing complaints not resolved swiftly.
- Strengthening the capacity of service providers. This is essential, especially given the high turnover of senior staff in municipal utilities as a result of frequent changes in municipal governments. It is important to make municipal service providers more autonomous, to insulate them as much as possible from political influence, and to provide training and a career path for utility employees.
- Redefining the role of the private sector in service provision. Private sector participation in water and sanitation in Latin America and the Caribbean has had mixed results. Some international operators have lost interest in the sector, sometimes citing governments’ failure to abide by contracts. Other private utility companies have raised costs of water use to unaffordable levels for low-income residents. However, local private operators continue to play a major role in the sector, helping to improve efficiency and service quality, especially if state supervision is adequate.
- Strengthening information systems and impact evaluations. Utilities often have only very limited information available on the quality of their services and their assets. Regulators and governments often have even less, and there are frequently only rudimentary data available on how projects and programs have influenced coverage and service quality. The strengthening of local and national information systems and impact evaluations is therefore a priority for the region.
- Improving regulatory frameworks. A regulatory framework that ensures that the interests of both the consumer and the investor are adequately represented is essential. However, experience with utility regulation (see economic regulation) in the region is sobering, given the limited autonomy and resources of many regulators, as well as the limited ability of many service providers to fulfill norms set by regulators.

== See also ==
- Disruption of the water cycle in Haiti
- Micro credit for water supply and sanitation
- Wastewater discharge standards in Latin America
- Water management
- List of water supply and sanitation by country

== Sources ==
- Foster, Vivien: Ten Years of Water Service Reform in Latin America: Toward an Anglo-French Model, World Bank, Water Supply and Sanitation Sector Board Discussion Paper Series No. 3, January 2005.World Bank 2005 Water
- WHO/UNICEF: Joint Monitoring Program (JMP) for Water and Sanitation at JMP
- Pan-American Health Organization (PAHO)/Division of Health and Environment: Regional Report on the 2000 Evaluation in the Americas - Drinking Water and Sanitation. Current State and Perspectives, Washington DC, 2001.PAHO 2000
- Rangel Soares, Luiz Carlos et al.: Inequities in access to and use of drinking water services in Latin America and the Caribbean, Public Health 11(5/6), 2002
- World Bank: Infrastructure in Latin America and the Caribbean. Recent Developments and Key Challenges, Washington DC, 2005. World Bank 2005 Infrastructure
