= List of responsibilities in the water supply and sanitation sector in Latin America and the Caribbean =

This is a list of the different responsibilities in the water supply and sanitation sector in several Latin American and Caribbean countries. It includes the responsible institutions which set sector policies, agencies of economic regulation and service providers in urban and rural areas. The list can only give a simplified description in many cases due to overlapping responsibilities and/or unclear definitions. For more information on water supply and sanitation in each country, please click the respective country link.

Country	Sector policy	Economic regulation	Service provision (urban areas)	Service provision (rural areas)
Argentina	At the provincial level	14 out of 23 provinces have regulatory bodies	Public, cooperative and private entities of various forms	
Bolivia	Ministry of Water	Superintendencia de Saneamiento Básico (SISAB)	Municipalities, EPSAs (mixed or public companies and cooperatives)	Water boards or water committees
Brazil	Ministry of Cities	Municipalities; Regulatory agencies in 14 states	Municipalities, state water and sewerage companies	
Chile	Department of Sanitation Programs of the Ministry of Public Works	Superintendencia de Servicios Sanitarios (SISS)	Private owned or private operated companies at the regional level	Cooperatives and water boards
Colombia	Ministry of Environment, Housing and Territorial Development	Potable Water and Basic Sanitation Regulation Commission (CRA), Superintendency of Public Services	Municipalities, direct or through public or private utilities	Communal water boards
Costa Rica	Ministry of Health	Autoridad Reguladora de los Servicios Públicos (ARESEP)	Instituto Costarricense de Acueductos y Alcantarillados (AyA), municipalities, Empresa de Servicios Públicos de Heredia (ESPH S.A.), Administrative Committees of Rural Water Systems (CAARs) and Administrative Associations of Rural Water and Sanitation Systems (ASADAS), private organizations that operate water systems	
Cuba	Instituto Nacional de Recursos Hidraulicos (INRH) and ministries		Provinces and municipalities through their respective water and sanitation directorates, PSP in Habana	3,220 rural water systems
Dominican Republic	Secretariado Técnico de la Presidencia	None	Regional companies in the largest cities, the Instituto Nacional de Aguas Potables y Alcantarillados (INAPA)	Community-based water boards
Ecuador	Subsecretaría de Agua Potable, Saneamiento y Residuos Sólidos (SPASyRS) under the Ministry of Urban Development and Housing and others (overlapping responsibilities)	None, ECAPAG in Guayaquil	Municipalities (directly or through utilities), PSP in Guayaquil	More than 5,000 Potable Water Boards
El Salvador	Administración Nacional de Acueductos y Alcantarillados (ANDA)		Administración Nacional de Acueductos y Alcantarillados (ANDA) (40%), municipalities, decentralized service providers, housing developers	More than 800 community-based organizations, including water boards and cooperative development associations
Guatemala	No clear leadership; Various institutions, including the Ministry of Health, the Instituto de Fomento Municipal (INFOM), the Ministry of Environment and the Planning Secretariat in the President's Office	None	Municipalities, public, communal and private entities	Communities through water committees
Guyana	Ministry of Housing and Water	Public Utilities Commission (PUC)	Guyana Water Incorporated (GWI) (public)	
Haiti	De facto: Ad hoc interventions by the Minister of Public Works, Transport and Communications; no long-term policy		CAMEP (Centrale Autonome Métropolitaine d’Eau Potable) in Port-au-Prince metropolitan area, and SNEP (Service National d’Eau Potable), in secondary cities	Water committees (Comités d’Aprovisionnement en Eau Potable - CAEPs)
Honduras	Consejo Nacional de Agua Potable y Saneamiento (CONASA)	Ente Regulador de los Servicios de Agua Potable y Saneamieto (ERSAPS), local regulatory agencies	Municipalities, The Servicio Autónomo Nacional de Acueductos y Alcantarillados (SANAA), PSP in San Pedro Sula	Water boards (Juntas Administradoras de Agua – JAA)
Jamaica	Ministry of Water and Housing (MWH)	Office of Utilities Regulation (OUR)	Public National Water Commission (NWC) and three smaller private service providers	NWC and Parish Councils
Mexico	Comisión Nacional del Agua (CONAGUA), State Water Commissions at the regional level	None	Municipalities and states directly or through cooperatives, public or private utilities	Water boards (Juntas)
Nicaragua	Comisión Nacional de Agua Potable y Alcantarillado Sanitario (CONAPAS)	Instituto Nicaragüense de Acueductos y Alcantarillados (INAA)	Empresa Nicaragüense de Acueductos y Alcantarillados (ENACAL), municipalities, departmental water company in Rio Blanco	Potable water committees
Panama	Ministry of Health	Autoridad Nacional de Servicios Públicos (ANSP)	Instituto de Acueductos y Alcantaeillados Nacional (IDAAN), municipality of Boquete	Juntas Administrativas de Acueductos Rurales (JAARs), Health Committees
Paraguay	Ministry of Public Works	Ente Regulador de Servicios Sanitarios (ERSSAN)	Empresa de Servicios Sanitarios de Paraguay (ESSAP), Juntas de Saneamiento, Aguateros (informal service providers in small towns)	
Peru	Vice Ministry of Construction and Sanitation (VMCS); National Sanitation Board (DNS)	Superintendencia Nacional de Servicios de Saneamiento (SUNASS)	Servicio de Agua Potable y Alcantarillado de Lima (SEDAPAL), 53 Empresas Prestadoras de Servicios Municipales (EPS), municipalities	Administrative water committees
Uruguay	Dirección Nacional de Aguas y Saneamiento (DINASA) within the Ministry of Housing, Land Management and Environment	Unidad Reguladora de Servicios de Energía y Agua (URSEA)	Obras Sanitarias del Estado (OSE)	
Venezuela	Ministry of Environment and Natural Resources	De facto none	Compañía Anónima Hidrológica de Venezuela (HIDROVEN), five state water companies, the Corporación Venezolana de Guayana (CVG), municipalities, urban cooperatives	Community-based organizations

== See also ==
- Water supply and sanitation in Latin America
