= Wastewater discharge standards in Latin America =

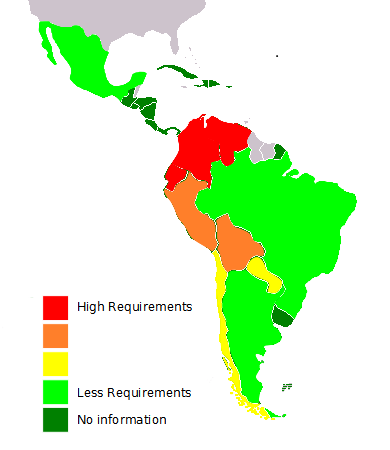
Requirements of wastewater sewer discharge in Latin America

Wastewater discharge standards protect water sources from pollution and mismanagement. Each country in Latin America has its own set of standards, and these vary according to types of water use, agricultural, industrial or recreational use. Water quality is maintained by controlling the physicochemical and bacteriological parameters. The majority of water laws include fines for noncompliance. In many cases fines are inadequate and do not stop offending. In other cases the standards are lax and monitoring is sub-par.

This article summarizes the majority of wastewater discharge standards in Latin America, complemented with a country ranking considering the quantity and severity of their regulations. Also, a comparative analysis of relevant standards is made, and a real case description for each country when the regulation was not accomplished.

== Chile ==
In Chile, the Ministry of Publics Works developed the standard, the decrete number 609, approved on May 7, 1998. This norm was created with the aim to control the effluents discharged into the sewer system. This norm establishes the maximum discharge concentration in sewer systems and also the different parameters that will be monitored, depending on the economic activity developed by each industry. It also establishes the methods that must be used for taking samples of each parameter.

The control of the norm is responsibility of the company that provides the service of recollection of wastewater, being the regulator of sanitary services companies the main responsible. If a company produces disruption in the service, in terms of quality or quantity of the recollection, the companies of recollection of wastewater could suspend the service to that company.

Case description

In May 2009 Aguas Andinas, controlled by the Spanish Enterprise Agbar, will pay a fine because of a lawsuit presented against it by a group of neighbors because of the foul smells coming from the "La Farfana", a waste water treatment plant. This is one of the waste water recycling plants of Aguas Andinas. The bad odors caused digestive and psychological problems. The organization announced that it will appeal this judgement, based on the argument that it was due to a couple of precise episodes beyond its control that did not cause any environmental or personal harm.

In June 2007, the Sanitary Services Superintendent's Office (SISS) started a lawsuit against the paper company Licancel after "not complying with the 90 Supreme Decrete, that regulates waste water disposal".

As the Superintendent's Office said, this decision is based on the investigation been forwarded that confirmed that this organization discharged its waste water without complying with the norm. As legislation establishes this office can propose and apply the corresponding sanctions, such as fines between one and a thousand Annual Tributary Units (UTA). This means around 392 Million Pesos.

== Bolivia ==
The norm for discharge is under the Law 1333, approved on April 27, 1992. This law is the general law of environment, and for the specific case was created a regulation for water pollution.

This regulation is applied to every entity that produces contamination in the water. In the case of the discharge over sewer systems the regulation is under Chapter IV. It is stated that every company must agree with the company that provides the service of recollection of wastewater and the limits of discharge. The limits presented in this article, are those for new companies and for companies in process of identification of the type of body water that the company will discharge.

Case description

In August 2003, all the mining producers working in the city of Potosí must discharge their waste waters to a specific dike; otherwise they will be obliged to stop their operations. This statement, made by the director of Environment and Sustainable development, Limbert Paredes, who pointed out that this agreement was taken between the Mining Engineers Association of Potosí, law representatives and authorities of Potosí County.

These companies installed in the upper side of the city must build a pipeline to discharge their waste water by the end of June 2003, which was not done. Because of this, a new meeting was held and a new deadline was given, August 9.

In February 2009, the neighbors of the "Mercado Walter Khon" have demanded attention from local authorities because streets were flooded with waste water coming out from the sewers. Because of this social pressure, the city council made the maintenance and cleaning of the sewers close by the area where waters arose.

Besides some maintenance facts that helped in the flooding, the city council does not restore the S-2 pumping station. Therefore, the wastewater is not properly pumped into the treatment plant.

According to the city's responsible, Marcelo Vidal, because of the constant rain added to garbage and plastic bags, the sewer system is not working properly. Even though he pointed that the main problem's origin is in the pumping station, the situation has not been solved up to date.

== Peru ==
In Peru, the norm has only few parameters with limits. These parameters are: temperature (35 °C (95 °F)), fats and oil (100 mg/L), PH (5 – 8.5), BOD (1000 mg/L) and settleable solids. However a more comprehensive norm was developed by the ministry of housing, which now is under review and analysis of the Ministry of the Environment. In the present article, the values presented are the ones under approval. This new regulation was developed because of the damage that industrial wastewater is causing to the sewer system. For example, in year 2006 a study showed that 58% of the sample (24 companies) surpassed the limit of BOD5 established in the current norm. In the same year other study showed that 57% of the sample (9 companies) surpassed the same norm.

Case description

In 2010, water quality was one of the main problems of Peru. Only 25% of the domestic water is treated, and the rest of it is thrown into rivers and lakes. This is why a series of measures have been addressed by government. In April 2010, the "National Authority of Water" will implement different laboratories in order to determine the pollution degree of wastewater from industries. Penalties of up to 36 million Soles have been announced for companies that do not treat their residual water.

== Brazil ==
In Brazil, the parameters presented correspond to the federal district. The regulation of the parameters is under the decree N°18.328 of June 8, 1997. In the norm is established the maximum limit for industrial effluents in the federal district. Also it's stated the fines applied in the case the companies surpass the norm. Also the decree indicates the type of industry and the types of parameters, that each of them must control.

== Ecuador ==
The norm that regulates the limits of discharge in Ecuador, is under the general law of environmental management, and was created with the aim of regulate the discharge over sewer systems, criteria of water quality for several uses and the procedures for measuring the parameters on the water. Also the norm establishes that companies must keep a record of the generated effluents with the main operational data related to the effluents.

Case description

In December 2009, the Environment Ministry fined on November 25, five companies of Manta and Montecristi with US$43,600 after the failure to execute the environmental policy. These companies: SEAFMAN C.A., Treatment plant IROTOP S.A., LA FABRIL S.A., EUROFISH S.A., Y GONDI S.A. have to pay immediately. The results of laboratory samples proved that levels of different substances were over the limits that were established in the Environment Quality and Waste Water Regulations. An action plan has been implemented to avoid the surpass of the limits.

In December 2007, in "Manglares" of "El Salvado", the fauna and flora which are extremely varied are being affected by households and companies, because of loads coming from thermal power plants. Such discharges generate high temperatures (more than 35 °C (95 °F)) that exceed the accepted and established limits, and in consequence the ecosystem is suffering irreversible damage.

Companies like "Categ" and "Electroguayas" have been forced to pay US$1000 fine, but this has not stopped this situation. Other company called "Interagua" has announced a new project that considers water treatment system for this area. The same is planned for Puerto Azul and the rest of the nearby cities.

== Argentina ==
The national law that regulates water resource in Argentina is the Decree 674 of 1989, established by the National Executive Power and applies to the Federal Capital and all the parties of Buenos Aires Province that are subscribed to the National Sanitary Works Entity regime. The aim of the law is to protect national water resources in means of good water usage, water pollution and the good functioning of the National Sanitary Works Entity installations.

As well, it's applied the Resolution 79179 of 1990, which includes the instrumental arrangements for the Decree 674 implementation. This Resolution includes wastewater discharging parameters to sewer system, water course and rainwater collectors, which are included in Annex A of the law.

Case Description

In June 2006, in Argentina the concentration of different natural heavy materials, bacteria, nitrates and hydrocarbons exceed by much the figures considered dangerous. It is not by chance that rivers like the Paraná, Salado del Norte, Salado del Sur, Carcarañá, de la Plata and Colorado are among the most polluted on Earth. Argentina does not have control means for wastewater treatment or disposal. There is information that relates about important and numerous water bodies being affected by wastewater disposal, with intense eutrophication processes due to the lack of treatment.

One out of four hospital beds is occupied by someone with a water related illness. In some inner areas of the country, like Rosario and Córdoba, water bodies are so polluted that the work in the water treatment plants has been affected. There are some projects to build treatment plants in the main locations, but discharges keeps growing.

Disposals from companies added to the domestic ones in the Riachuelo-Matanza sum up to 368,000 cubic metres (13,000,000 ft^{3}) per day, which is double of the minimum average flow of the river. The mud in it has great concentrations of Chrome, Copper, Mercury, Zinc, and Lead. In addition, the highest concentrations of Lead and Chrome are located in the border between the councils of Avellaneda and Lanús, in the Buenos Aires province.

The given treatments are not sufficient by any means, moreover, the treatments done by companies to their waste water are between deficient and non-existing. Most of the water consumed by population comes from the same water bodies in which waste and domestic water is dumped, and because of the lack of treatment these populations ends up drinking water of doubtful quality or at a high purification cost.

In May 2005, a report generated by the Nation's General Audit (AGN) states that the plants that produce water drinkable are also polluting with elements contained in their waste water, which are over the national and provincial legislation.

== Mexico ==
Mexican Law of National Waters regulates water exploitation, use, distribution, control, and the preservation of water quantity and quality.

To manage the wastewater disposal and control water sources quality, it was created in 1996 by the Environmental, Natural Resources and Fishing Secretarial, the official norm NOM-002-ECOL that establishes the maximum permissible limits of pollutants in wastewater discharges in urban sewer system. The norm specifies the permissible concentrations of pollutants per day, per month and instantaneous sampling, which are included in Chapter 4 of this norm.

Case Description

In January 2010, members of the Ducks Unlimited Association of Mexico warned of the death of more than 5,000 migratory birds. The specialist from the association assured that the main cause of this episode was the non-treated waste waters from industrial polluters. He pointed out the real problem of pollution existing in the "De Silva" dam, and in some others dams in the state. He demanded intervention of the National Water Commission (Conagua) and from SEMARNAR, in order to regulate the discharge of waste water that ends up in the Turbio River.

In April 2010, the Municipal Commission of Water and Sewer System of Altamira (COMAPA) was fined by the National Water Commission, between 40 and 50 thousand pesos, for not having a water treatment plant as stated by law for all municipalities of the state of Tataulipas. The next stage would be built a pumping station in "La Pedrera" and the facility must be finished this year.

== Colombia ==
The main regulator norm for water management is the Decree 1594 of 1984, which normalizes water usages and wastewater disposal through the country. The decree establishes water quality standards, which are guides to be used as a basis for decision making in assignation of water uses and determination of water characteristics for each application. Water discharging parameters to public sewage are described in Chapter VI of this decree.

Also, it was considered the Resolution 3957 of 2009 to enlarge the water parameters comparison in Colombia. This resolution establishes the technical norm, for wastewater discharges management and control in public sewage for the capital district.

Case Description

A report published by the National University confirms the presence of Lead, Cadmium, Mercury and Arsenic in plants watered with the polluted water of the Bogotá River. According to it, vegetables have high levels of heavy metals that can be dangerous for human health.

For the Regional Autonomous Corporation (CAR) this is due to industrial downloads. In general, levels found in water, soil and vegetables of this area are much higher than the limits allowed by the World Health Organization. The authors, Soacha y Mosquera show figures much higher than the European Union limits.

In August 2008, the industrial firm "Coca-Cola Femsa" was fined $111,000 USD due to its illegal discharge of industrial water in Bogotá, as informed by the District Environmental of the Capital District of Columbia. A technical report conducted by the Aqueduct and Sewer system of Bogotá proved the existence of some waste water disposal that does not go through the company's treatment plant.

The former Administrative Environmental Department (Dama) has given to the company an allowance for having a downloading point in October 2006, but the Aqueduct and Sewer system of Bogotá found that place has already four discharge points, none of them registered or authorized. Since January 2008, those four points were closed down and conducted to a treatment plant.

== Venezuela ==
The Environmental Organic Law of Venezuela gives the guidelines in terms of water management, as a duty of the state for the protection of watersheds. This in terms of classification and control of the quality of water bodies, control of effluent discharges or fluids susceptible of degrading the aquatic environment and altering the levels of quality required to preserve and improve the environment. The Decree 883 follows these guidelines, being Venezuela's national norm for water classification and control, created in 1995.

The Decree regulates the quality of water bodies and wastewater discharges. This law establishes the different types of water and the permissible parameters for water discharges in accordance to the final water use. Wastewater discharging parameters to public sewer system are contained in section V of Decree 883.

== Paraguay ==
The Congress of Paraguay created Law 1614 of 2000 as the general regulatory and tariff framework for drinking water and sanitary sewer supply. Following the law's guidelines, was created the Quality Regulation for drinkable water supply and sanitation, which applies to the entire country. This regulation includes in its Title VI, all what refers to quality of the performance of sanitary sewer supply. In Annex 10 are shown the maximum limits for physicochemical parameters, specifying discharge values for the type of wastewater treatment applied.

== Summary Table ==
Parameter	Units (daily)	Chile	Bolivia	Peru	Brazil	Ecuador	Argentina	Mexico	Colombia	Venezuela	Paraguay	Canada
Aluminium	Value (mg/L)			10		5			10	5		
Antimony	Value (mg/L)		1	0.5								
Arsenic	Value (mg/L)	0.5	1	0.5	1.5	0.1	0.5	0.75	0.5	0.5	0.5	1
Barium	Value (mg/L)					5			5	0.1		
BOD5	Value (mg/L)	33 – 50	80	250		250	200	200	800	350	250	300
Boron	Value (mg/L)			4					5			
Cadmium	Value (mg/L)	0.5	0.3	0.2	1.5	0.02	0.1	0.75	0.1	0.2	0.2	0.7
Carbonates	Value (mg/L)									0.25		
Chlorine (active)	Value (mg/L)					0.5						
Chloroform	Value (mg/L)					0.1			1			
Chrome (Hexavalent)	Value (mg/L)	0.5	0.1	0.5	0.5	0.5	0.2	0.75	0.5	0.5	1	
Chrome (Tetravalent)	Value (mg/L)		1		5		2					
Chrome (Total)	Value (mg/L)	10		10					1	2		4
Cobalt	Value (mg/L)					0.5			0.5			
COD	Value (mg/L)		250–300	500		500			1500	900	600	
Copper	Value (mg/L)	3	1	3	1.5	1		15	3	1	1	2
Cyanide	Value (mg/L)	1	0.2 – 0.5	1	0.2	1	0.1	1.5	1	0.2	0.2	
Fats and Oil	Value (mg/L)	150	10–20	100	150	100	100	75	100	150	100	150
Fluoride	Value (mg/L)				10							10
Hydrocarbons	Value (mg/L)	20				20	50		20	20	100	
Iron	Value (mg/L)		1		15	25			10	25	5	
Lead	Value (mg/L)	1	0.6	0.5	1.5	0.5	0.5	1.5	0.5	0.5	0.5	1
Manganese	Value (mg/L)			4		10			1	10	1	
Mercury	Value (mg/L)	0.02	0.002	0.02	1.5	0.01	0.005	0.015	0.02	0.01	0.01	0.01
NH3 – NH4+	Value (mg/L)	80	4	80		40						
Niquel	Value (mg/L)	4		4	2	2		6	2	2	2	2
pH		5.5 – 9.0	6.9	6–8	6–10	5–9	5.5 – 10	5.5 – 10	5–9	6–9	5–9	
Phenolic compounds	Value (mg/L)		1		5	0.2	0.5		0.2	0.5	0.5	
Phosphorus	Value (mg/L)	10–45		10		15		20		10		10
Selenium	Value (mg/L)					0.5			0.5	0.2		
Settleable solids	mL/L 1 hour	20		8.5	20	20	0.5	7.5	10		1	
Silver	Value (mg/L)				1.5	0.5			0.5	0.1		
Sulphates (dissolved)	Value (mg/L)	1000		250	1000	400				400		
Sulphide	Value (mg/L)	5	2	5	1	1	1		1	2	1	
Surfactant	mg/L	7					5		10	8	5	
Suspended solids (total)	Value (mg/L)	300	60	300		220		200	600	400		350
Temperature	°C	35	±5 °C	35	40	40	45	< 40	< 40	40	40	
Tin	Value (mg/L)		2		4							
Vanadium	Value (mg/L)					5				5		
Zinc	Value (mg/L)	5	3	5	5	10		9	5	10	5	2

== Comparison Analysis ==
For purposes of having an idea of the requirements of the regulation, an index was created with the aim to rank the countries. This concept assumes that if a country has tighten limits than other, or if it declares explicitly a limit, then the regulation could be considered more stringent.

This index takes in account all the parameters listed in the table, assuming the following criteria. If a country doesn't have any regulation, then it will get 1, from a scale of 10. If the country has the minimum limit it will get 10 points, if it has the maximum then it will get 5 points. Later, an average is taken from all the parameters of the country, giving the index a relative position of all the countries. Afterwards, all the values are classified using quartiles.

A summary with the values of each country is presented below.

	Chile	Bolivia	Peru	Brazil	Ecuador	Argentina	Mexico	Colombia	Venezuela	Paraguay
Index	4.5	5.3	5.3	4.3	6.8	4.0	3.6	5.9	6.3	5.0
Quartile	2	3	3	1	4	1	1	4	4	2

=== pH ===
The pH is a chemical parameter that measures the acidity or basicity of the water and is commonly measured in situ. Distilled water has a pH of 7, where less than 7 is considered acid and greater than 7 is considered basic. In most cases, low pH is due to organic overloading and low oxygen conditions in the water. This characteristic is strictly controlled because it has a direct effect on water ecosystems and sewer systems materials.

Usually, pH standard is between 6 and 9 and can vary easily depending on the discharge content. In this case, Peru was the country with the smallest range (6–8) and Argentina and Mexico were the ones with the widest range (5.5–10).

=== Settleable Solids ===
A low concentration of suspended solids in water or even complete removal after treatment is crucial to maintain water ecosystems development. High concentrations of suspended solids can slow down photosynthesis, reduce dissolved oxygen and increase water temperature.

That is why suspended solids is a relevant parameter in wastewater discharge, that can be attributed to both industrial and domestic wastewater. When comparing wastewater regulations, it was found that Bolivia has the strictest limit for this parameter (60 mg/L) while Colombia presented the highest limit (600 mg/L). The value presented for Colombia was extracted from the technical norm for wastewater discharges management and control in public sewage for the capital district. Within these two limit values is shown a big difference among the two countries regulations for these standard, whereas for Canada was encountered an average value of 350 mg/L.

=== BOD_{5} ===
The BOD_{5} standard is also an indicator of the presence of settleable solids in water, but specifically for organic matter. BOD_{5} represents the amount of oxygen required by microorganisms to stabilize organic material present in wastewater. A higher concentration of BOD_{5} means a high load of organic matter to be stabilized by microorganisms.

Chile has the stricter regulation for BOD_{5} permitting wastewater discharges with a value between 33 and 55 mg/L. Also, Chile was the only country that presented a range for the limit of this parameter. By the other hand, Colombia has the higher limit with 800 mg/L. In this case, is also taken the value from the Capital District Regulation, because there wasn't a specific value presented in the national norm, just said that BOD_{5} removal must be greater than 80% for a new user. In comparison with Canada and the other countries, Chile's limit is a very strict value.

=== Arsenic ===
Arsenic is considered as a substance of sanitary interest and at the same time is one of the most toxic elements that exist. Arsenic can be found naturally in the environment and also be an essential trace element for some animals. Due to human activities, mainly through mining and melting, arsenic can now be found on many more places than where they existed naturally.

World production of arsenic, in the form of its oxide, is around 50,000 tons per year. Chile and Mexico are primary exporters of arsenic. Also, it is mainly emitted by copper producing industries, but also during lead and zinc production and in agriculture. Arsenic can't be destroyed once it has entered the environment, which causes severe health effects on humans and animals.

As mentioned before, Chile and Mexico are primary producers of arsenic and when checking arsenic limit values in their regulations aren't the more severe ones. Mexico and Brazil are the countries with a higher limit value and Ecuador stays with the lower limit. As arsenic is also linked with agriculture; it is important to emphasize that the majority of the Latin-American countries are characterized by having an agricultural economy. As a result, limit values encountered for arsenic in all the regulations varies from a small range of 0.1 to 1 mg/L.

=== Cadmium ===
Cadmium is also considered as a substance of sanitary interest. It can be found naturally in the environment and it always occurs in combination with zinc. In industry is a by-product of zinc, lead and copper extraction. It is also found in many manures and pesticides.

Cadmium can easily end up in soils and transported to surface waters when using manures and pesticides. Regulations for Cadmium are strict, and thus little Cadmium enters the water through disposal of wastewater.

The main producing country is of zinc is Canada, with Mexico and Peru also being ones of the major suppliers. In the regulations comparison, Cadmium standard was more severe in Ecuador with an acceptance of 0,02 mg/L, whilst Brazil was the laxer one with 1,5 mg/L. For the case of Canada, Mexico and Peru, the latter has the stricter limit among them with 0,2 mg/L, while the other two remain in the average with 0,7 mg/L.

=== Cyanide ===
Cyanide, a substance of sanitary concern, is only present in wastewater due to use and discharge from the industrial sector. Cyanide has severe effects both in human health and ecosystems. The severity of the harmful effects following cyanide exposure depends in part on the form of cyanide, such as hydrogen cyanide gas or cyanide salts. It becomes more dangerous when exposure concentrations are high. Cyanide has been a major component of metal plating solutions and is mainly produced for the mining of gold and silver mining.

In terms of Latino-American regulations, Argentina is the country that presents the harsher limit value with 0,1 mg/L. By the contrary, Mexico was the one with the higher limit value with 1,5 mg/L.

Among the Latin-American countries, Colombia is the only one that is mentioned as having gold mining industry. The limit value for Cyanide is quite high (1 mg/L) to the limit value of Argentina. However, three more other countries have the same limit value for Cyanide.

=== Hexavalent chromium ===
Hexavalent chromium is a toxic component that can cause allergic reactions on the skin and also several problems in the respiratory system. This is a component present in the industries of chemicals, leather, textiles, and electro painting, among others.

The minimum requirement for this element is presented in Bolivia (0.1 mg/L), and the maximum is presented in Mexico (0.75 mg/L). Despite Brazil being one of the main producers of chromium, it doesn't have a maximum limit as do other countries.

== See also ==
- Water supply and sanitation in Latin America
