= Obras Sanitarias del Estado =

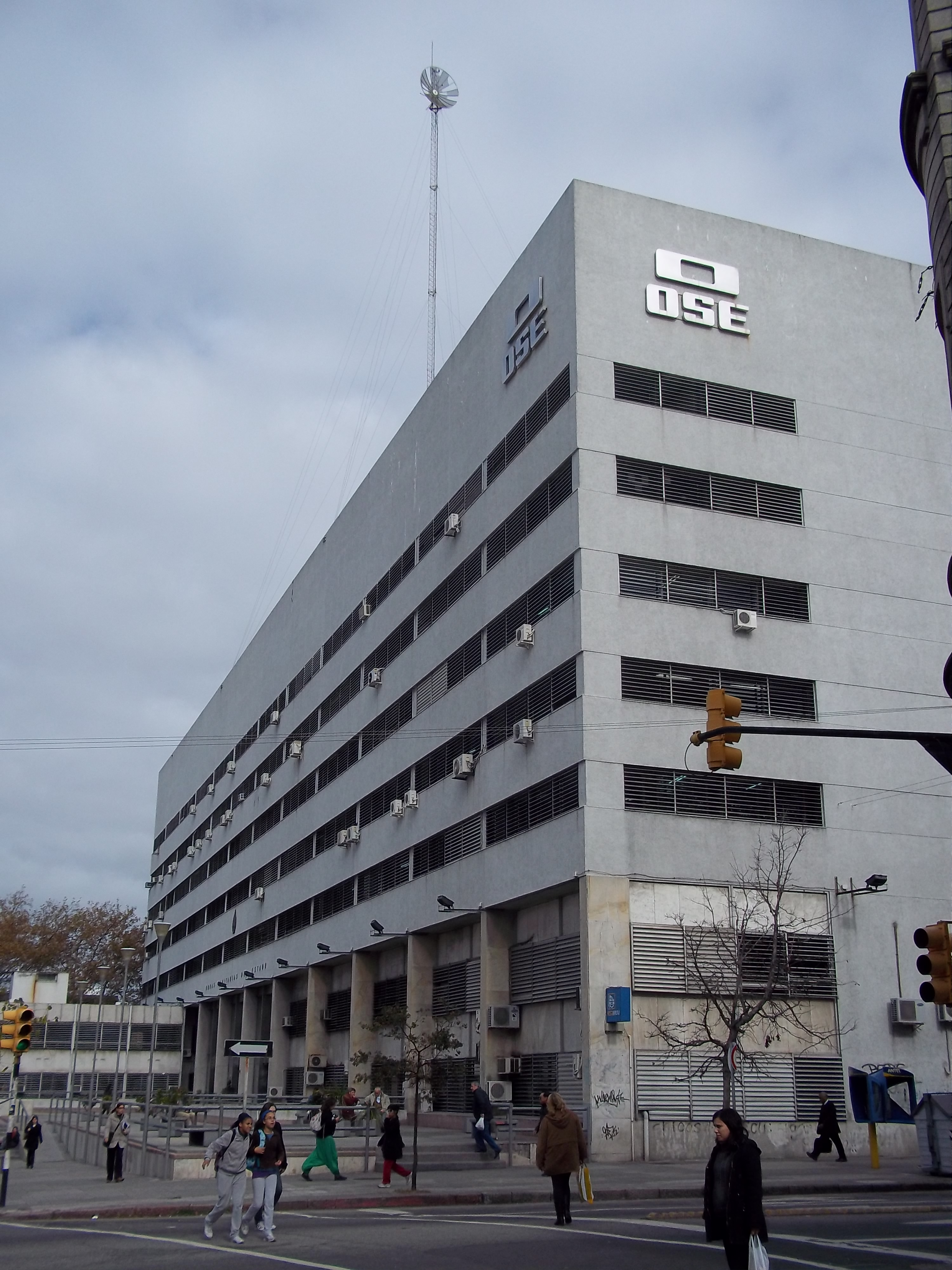
- Headquarters in Montevideo
- Type: State-owned
- Industry: Waterworks
- Founded: December 19, 1952; 73 years ago
- Headquarters: 1275 Carlos Roxlo St., Montevideo
- Area served: Uruguay
- Key people: Pablo Ferreri (Chairman); Raúl Caraballo (Vice President); Natalia González (General Manager); José Antonio Amy (Director)
- Website: OSE.com.uy

The National Administration of State Sanitary Works (OSE) (Spanish: Administración Nacional de las Obras Sanitarias del Estado) is the state-owned Uruguayan Water Utilities company.

== History ==
The water service in Uruguay dates back to the year 1867, when after a great drought, the National Government made a call and finally gave Enrique Fynn and other associates a concession to supply piped water to Montevideo. In 1868 the construction of a steam pumping plant began, a pipeline of almost 60 km and the installation of three fountains (Constitution Square, Plaza Artola and Plaza Flores) that received water for the supply of residents in the city. On May 13, 1871, the water pumped from the Santa Lucía River to the center of Montevideo arrived for the first time. On July 18 of that same year, the service was officially inaugurated with an act in which President Lorenzo Batlle y Grau participated. The place chosen to install the plant was an almost isolated area, without roads or trains, on the banks of the Santa Lucía River. The establishment of workers with their families, and later the incorporation of workers to the plant in operation, originated the Villa de Aguas Corrientes, which to this day has a very close link with the production of drinking water.

In 1879, eight years into the service, the concession was transferred to the English company Montevideo Waterworks Company, which was in charge of the service until 1950, when the Uruguayan State nationalized the company. During the English period, there was a great increase in demand, as well as the change from a supply without treatment, to one that incorporated each of the steps of purification. In 1952 after a two-year process, the Compañía de Aguas Corrientes merged with the Sanitation Directorate of the then Ministry of Public Works, which was in charge of supplying water in the interior of the country, creating the Administration of State Sanitary Works by law No. 11,907.

== Services ==
=== Drinking water ===
OSE is the company in charge of supplying drinking water nationwide, annually producing more than 350 million m³ of drinking water, which is distributed through 15,000 km of networks throughout the country. To do this, it has 71 plants that make water drinkable, the most important of which is the Aguas Corrientes Plant, located in Canelones Department, 56 km from the capital city. There, the water that supplies the metropolitan area (approximately 1,700,000 inhabitants) is made drinkable.

=== Sanitation ===
OSE is in charge of the sewage service throughout Uruguay except in the capital, Montevideo, since 1916 it has been in charge of the Intendancy of Montevideo. The sewerage system is made up of collector networks, pumping stations, effluent treatment plants, and final disposal sites. It currently has more than 40 domestic waste liquid treatment plants corresponding to medium and large towns, and more than a hundred small systems corresponding to housing programs.

== See also ==
- Water supply and sanitation in Uruguay
