= Disruption of the water cycle in Haiti =

In Haiti, the disruption of the water cycle remains a major environmental challenge, affecting biodiversity and the daily lives of the country's inhabitants. The problem has multiple causes, including the proliferation of shantytowns and the absence of a comprehensive urban development policy. Global warming is one of the main causes of this problem, faced with one of the most disastrous economic, social and political situations on the planet, Haiti is unable to implement an urban development policy. On the other hand, deforestation encourages natural disasters. Thus, the disruption of the water cycle remains a lasting threat to the country's development.

== Hydrological context in Haiti ==
Located in the Caribbean, Haiti is exposed to a considerable ecological imbalance, characterized by catastrophic floods associated with torrential rains and hurricanes, devastating earthquakes, extreme climatic and meteorological variations that disrupt the water cycle. These problems are exacerbated by deforestation, soil degradation and unsustainable agricultural practices. Climate change, pollution and deforestation are the main causes of water cycle disruption in cities and slums. These causes include an increase in ocean water temperature, and a considerable reduction in the quantity of water available at groundwater level.

=== Environmental impact ===
Climate change is often described as one of the most pressing environmental challenges we face worldwide. Long-term changes in temperature and precipitation are often accompanied by heat waves and intense rainfall, increasing the risk of flooding, especially in Caribbean countries such as Haiti.

Floods, droughts and the degradation of aquatic ecosystems are examples of the effects of disruption of the water cycle. Shortages of drinking water also aggravate public health problems.

Floods, torrential rains, droughts, changes in the frequency and intensity of precipitation and water scarcity are just some of the consequences of these disturbances. Important steps can be taken to reduce these disturbances, such as water conservation, protecting aquatic ecosystems, reducing pollution and promoting sustainable management of water resources, reforestation to preserve watersheds, improving agricultural techniques to reduce erosion, and adopting more efficient technologies for water management.

Climatic disturbances are also the cause of numerous infectious diseases, including vector-borne diseases transmitted by blood-sucking arthropods such as dengue fever, Zika, chikungunya and malaria.

Climate change is often described as one of the most pressing environmental challenges challenges we face worldwide.

Long-term changes in temperature and precipitation are often accompanied by heat waves heat waves and intense rainfall, increasing the risk of flooding, particularly in countries Caribbean countries such as Haiti.

==== Consequences ====
Disruption of the water cycle has a greater impact on physical ecosystems than temperature variations. ecosystems, which are sensitive to changes in hydro-climatic conditions. Precipitation intensity and physico-chemical water conditions at Lake Azuei in Haiti Azuei in Haiti can vary according to the natural abundance, composition and concentrations of concentrations of mineralogical elements in the sediments.

Human activities such as agricultural practices and changes in land cover caused by deforestation caused by deforestation have modified the land around Lake Azuei.

Floods, droughts and the degradation of aquatic ecosystems are examples of the effects disruption of the water cycle. The shortage of drinking water also aggravates public health problems.

Floods, torrential rains, droughts, changes in the frequency and intensity of precipitation and water scarcity are just some of the consequences of these changes and intensity of precipitation and water scarcity are just some of the consequences of these disruptions disturbances.

In addition, important measures can be taken to reduce these disturbances, such as water conservation, protection of aquatic ecosystems, reduction of pollution and promotion of sustainable management of water resources, reforestation to preserve watersheds, improved watersheds, improving agricultural techniques to reduce erosion and adopting more efficient technologies for water management.
