= Water supply and sanitation in Haiti =

Data
- Access to an improved water source: 64% (2010)
- Access to improved sanitation: 48% (2015)
- Continuity of supply: Mostly intermittent
- Share of household metering: Almost nil
- Financing: Almost entirely external grants

Institutions
- Decentralization to municipalities: None, but envisaged
- National water and sanitation company: DINEPA
- Water and sanitation regulator: None
- Responsibility for policy setting: Ministry of Public Works
- Sector law: Yes
- No. of urban service providers: n/a
- No. of rural service providers: Comités d'Eau (hundreds)

Haiti faces key challenges in the water supply and sanitation sector: Notably, access to public services is very low, their quality is inadequate and public institutions remain very weak despite foreign aid and the government's declared intent to strengthen the sector's institutions. Foreign and Haitian NGOs play an important role in the sector, especially in rural and urban slum areas.

== Access ==
Haiti's coverage levels in urban and rural areas are the lowest in the hemisphere for both water supply and sanitation. Sewer systems and wastewater treatment are nonexistent.

	Urban (52% of the population)	Rural (48% of the population)	Total
Improved water source	78%	49%	64%
Improved sanitation	34%	17%	26%

Source: Joint Monitoring Programme for Water Supply and Sanitation of WHO/UNICEF

In rural areas those without access to an improved water source got their drinking water primarily from unprotected wells (5%), unprotected springs (37%) and rivers (8%). In urban areas those without access to an improved source got their drinking water primarily from "bottled water" (20%), from carts with drums (4%) and unprotected wells (3%). Water in bottles or in small plastic bags is treated, bottled and sold by local private companies, often using reverse osmosis for treatment. Bottled water is also imported, especially in the aftermath of disasters such as the 2010 earthquake.

Those without access to improved sanitation either used shared latrines or defecate in the open. According to the Demographic and Health Survey of 2006, 10% of those living in urban areas and 50% of those living in rural areas defecated in the open.

Based on a survey of human rights experts administered by the Human Rights Measurement Initiative in 2019, Haiti is only doing 9.5% of what should be possible at its level of income on the right to water.

== Service quality ==
Coverage figures do not give an indication of service quality, which is generally quite poor. In rural areas, systems have often fallen into disrepair. They either do not provide any water service at all or provide service only to those close to the source, with those at the end of the system ("tail-enders") remaining without water. In almost all urban areas water supply is intermittent.

== History and recent developments ==
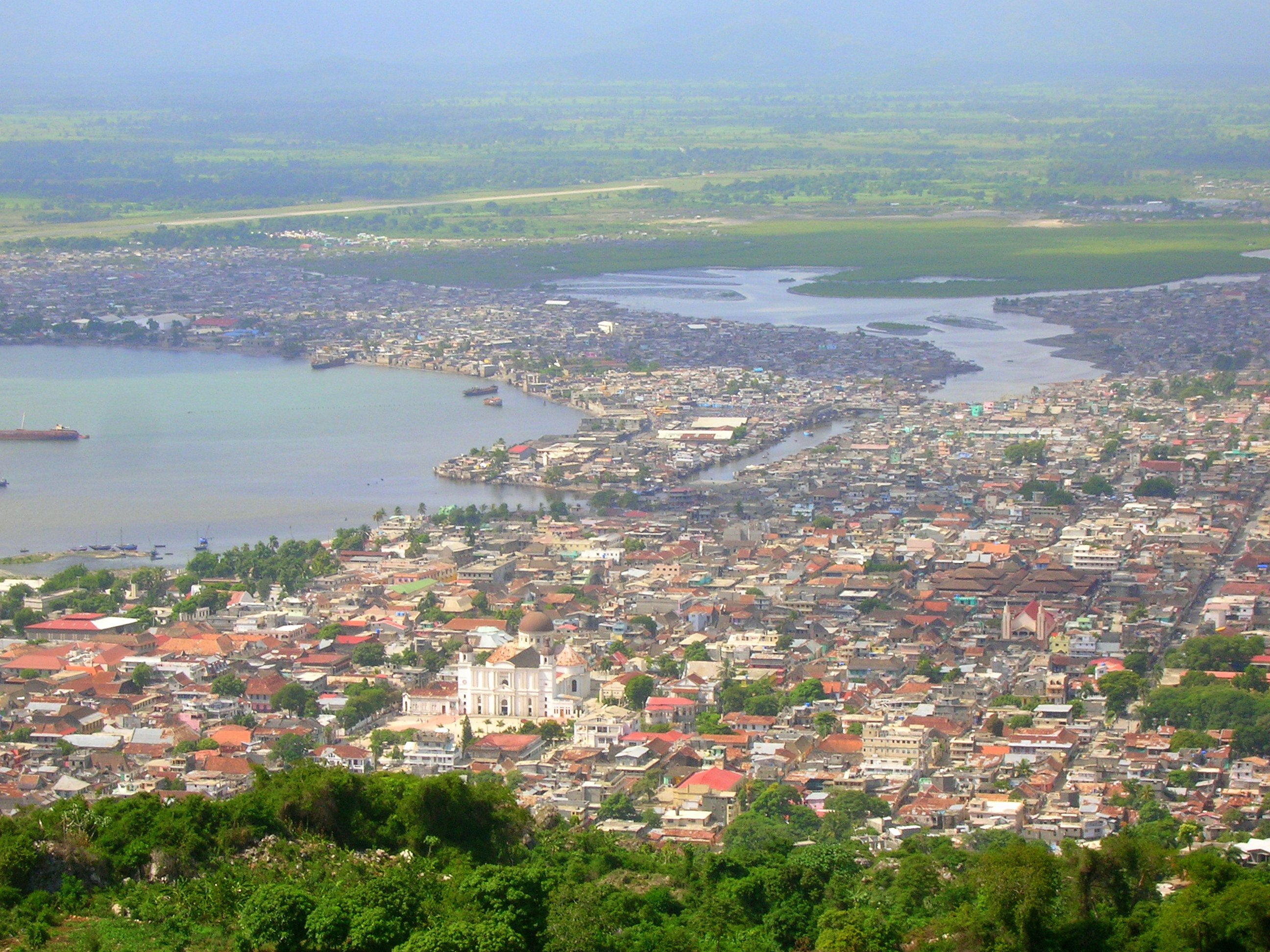
Cap-Haïtien, Haiti's second largest city.

In 1964 the government of François Duvalier created CAMEP, the Centrale Autonome Métropolitaine d'Eau Potable, responsible for the Port-au-Prince metropolitan area. Subsequently, in 1977 the government of his son Jean-Claude Duvalier created SNEP (Service National d'Eau Potable) to be in charge of water supply in the rest of the country. Shortly afterwards a rural water and hygiene unit called POCHEP after its French acronym was created in the Ministry of Health, since SNEP was focusing on secondary towns and did not have the ability to serve rural areas. All three entities struggled to increase coverage at the desired pace and to provide adequate levels of service quality. Nevertheless, the 1980s witnessed a certain increase of coverage as part of the International Water and Sanitation Decade, supported by numerous donors including the World Bank and the IDB as well as by numerous NGOs.

The 1990s witnessed a series of setbacks for the country and consequently for the water and sanitation sector as well. After a 1991 military coup foreign aid was suspended for three years. Aid began to flow in again after the return of Jean-Bertrand Aristide in 1994, a period which witnessed the emergence of water committees in Port-au-Prince. These community organizations sell water to slum dwellers at a small profit, which is reinvested in small-scale community infrastructure such as sports facilities or sanitary facilities. The water is bought from the utility, for which the water committees are one of their best-paying customers.

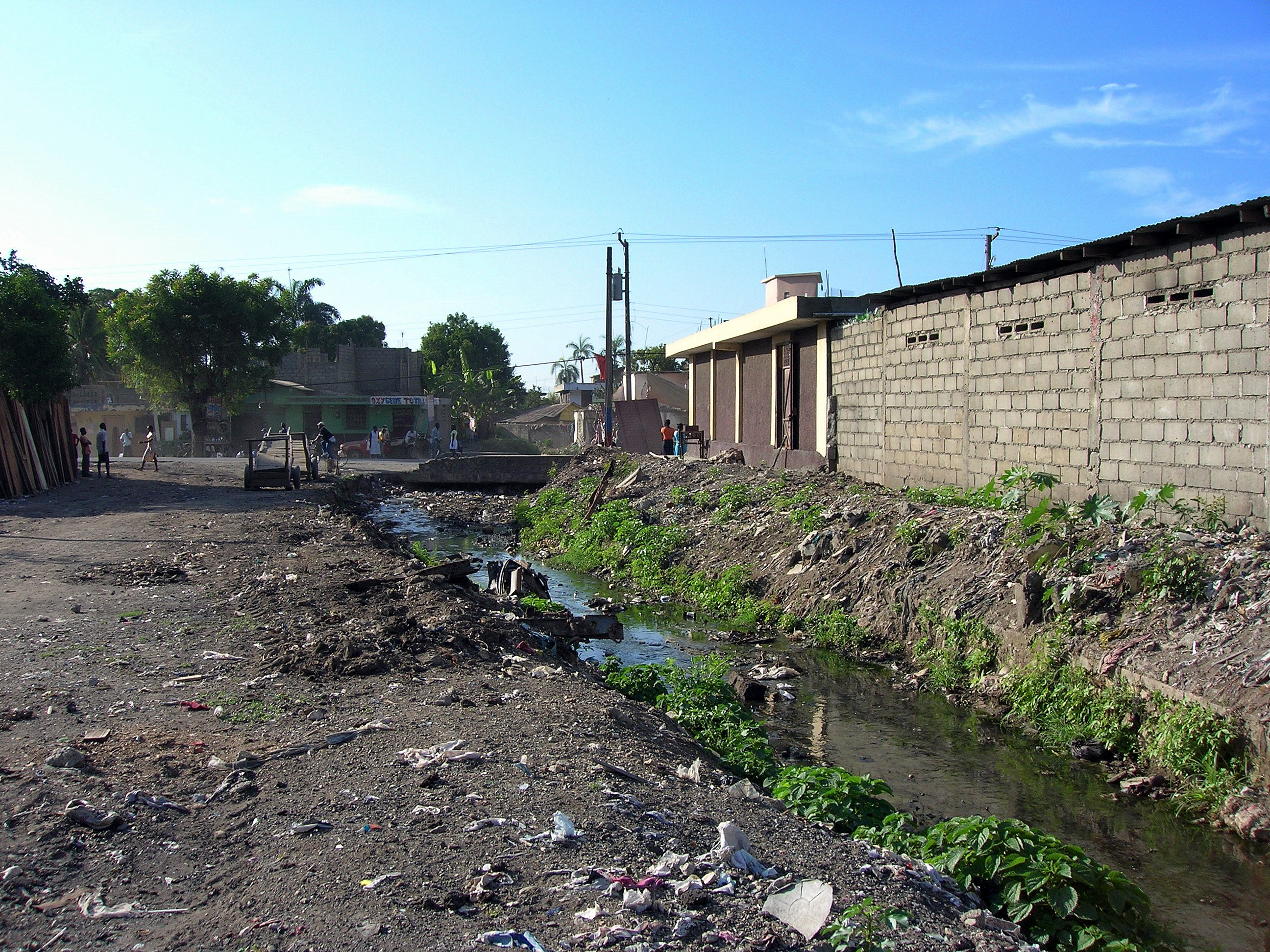
Poor sanitation in Cap-Haïtien: Waste blocks drainage canals, which overflow at the slightest rainfall into the adjacent structures (roads, buildings...).

In the late 1990s aid began to dry up again, which in turn again affected the performance of the sector and condemned a large share of the population to be without adequate services. External aid picked up again after the departure of Aristide in 2004 under a transition government and the second government of René Préval. The external assistance is particularly focused at towns in the interior of the country and on rural areas, while the staggering problem of supplying the metropolitan area of the capital with sufficient clean water and a sewer system remains unresolved.

The Preval government has engaged in a reform of the water sector by establishing a national directorate for water and sanitation and regional service providers through a framework law passed in 2009. The law aims at strengthening the government's policy and regulatory functions, to provide more orientation to the numerous NGOs active in water and sanitation.

In January 2010 parts of Haiti including the capital were hit by a massive earthquake. More than 1.5 million people were displaced and had to live in refugee camps without piped water supply or sanitation, where most of them still lived one year after the earthquake.

In October 2010 a cholera epidemia broke out that killed 6,435 people until September 2011. According to the US Centers for Disease Control the suspected source for the epidemic was the Artibonite River, from which some of the affected people had drunk water. An article in the journal Nature argues that "the limited resources available to combat the country's cholera epidemic should be spent on sanitation and clean water, rather than on vaccination".

== Responsibility ==
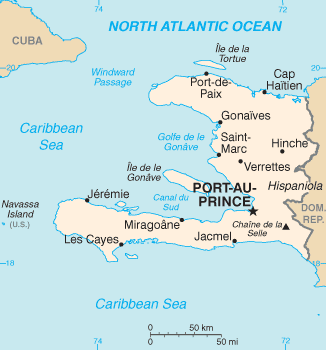

The main public institution in the Haitian water sector is the National Directorate for Water Supply and Sanitation in the Ministry of Public Works, called DINEPA, after its French acronym (Direction Nationale d'Eau Potable et d'Assainissement), directed in part by Edwige Petit. The directorate is in charge of implementing the sector policy, coordinating donor assistance and regulating service providers.

Regional service providers under the authority of the DINEPA are called OREPA (Offices Régionaux de l'Eau Potable et de l'Assainissement) and provide water supply in urban areas. Municipalities are supposed to become responsible for water supply and sanitation in the long run as per the framework law, but their capacity is limited and currently they play almost no role in the sector. Private operators and what are called "professional operators" can also operate water systems according to the water and sanitation framework law of 2009.

There are hundreds of water committees, called CAEPAs (Comités d'Aprovisionnement en Eau Potable et d'Assainissement) or simply Comités d'Eau, in charge of water systems in rural areas and some small towns. They consist of elected community members. Their degree of formalization and effectiveness varies considerably. The best water committees meet regularly, closely interact with the community, regularly collect revenues, hire a plumber who performs routine repairs, have a bank account and are registered and approved by DINEPA. However, many water committees fall short of these expectations. There is no national or regional registry of water committees or water systems and there are no associations of water committees at the municipal, departmental or national level. Another public entity that invests in water supply is FAES, a Social fund.

Sector agencies have lost qualified and trained staff, often to NGOs and donor agencies, because of their low pay levels. NGOs perform a wide variety of functions and often attract the most qualified and motivated staff due to their higher salary levels. They are particularly active in rural areas, but also in small towns and urban slums.

== Tariffs, cost recovery and financing ==
Tariffs in Haiti are flat rates due to the absence of metering for most customers, and can vary greatly depending on location and provider. Tariffs in the metropolitan area of Port-au-Prince are much higher than those in provincial towns. Tariffs are lowest in rural areas, if they are charged at all. In 2008 water tariffs in small towns varied from about the equivalent of $1 per month in the central plateau to roughly $7.30 per month in Kenscoff near the capital.

Metering is rare outside the capital and even there only a fraction of customers are metered, in particular water committees in the informal settlements in Port-au-Prince as well as industrial customers. Many private citizens and some major consumers, such as luxury hotels, have disconnected from the public network and receive all their water via tanker trucks.

The revenues of the OREPA barely cover operating costs, leaving insufficient resources for maintenance and no resources to self-finance investments. This problem is also evident in the myriad of community-operated and privately operated smaller systems throughout the country. Sometimes water is cut off to enforce payments, partly because payments cannot be enforced through the legal system. However, many customers reconnect illegally.

== External cooperation ==
A video by non-governmental organization Water.org of a woman collecting water in Haiti

Almost all investments are financed by grants from NGOs or official development assistance, chiefly the IDB, the World Bank, USAID and the European Union. As of 2013, for the first time a venture capital firm announced it would finance investments in the Haitian water sector.

=== Non-governmental organizations ===
Non-governmental organizations (NGOs): Many NGOs finance their activities through both individual contributions and grants that come directly from government donors or indirectly through the Haitian government.

Some of the NGOs active in drinking water supply in Haiti are:

- Action Contre la Faim (French),
- AMURT Haïti in Anse Rouge commune, Artibonite Department
- the Association haïtienne pour la maîtrise des eaux et des sols (ASSODLO) (Haitian).
- CARE (US),
- The Comité Protos Haïti (Haitian),
- The Centre for Affordable Water and Sanitation Technology (CAWST) (Canadian),
- Le Groupe de recherche et d'échanges technologiques (GRET) (French),
- Helvetas (Swiss),
- Inter Aide (French),
- International Action (US),
- Haiti Outreach (US),
- Oxfam (UK and Canada),
- Pan American Development Foundation (linked to the Organisation of American States)
- World Vision (US).
- Sustainable Organic Integrated Livelihoods (SOIL) (US)
- Living Waters for the World (US)
- Water Project For Haiti (Canada),

Most NGOs are not specialized in water supply, but rather undertake community development across various sectors in specific localities. However, some NGOs - like International Action, Helvetas, ACF and GRET - focus on water supply and some also focus on sanitation.

=== Official Development Assistance ===
Inter-American Development Bank

The Inter-American Development Bank is the largest donor for water supply and sanitation in Haiti with on-going projects in Port-au-Prince (since 2010), secondary cities (since 1998) and in rural areas (since 2006) implemented by DINEPA. The Spanish government provides substantial grant funding for IDB water and sanitation projects in Haiti.

World Bank

The World Bank supports two rural water supply and sanitation project implemented by DINEPA with total funding of US$10m and a series of community-driven development (CDD) projects that allow communities to choose the type of investment they want to undertake, including small-scale drinking water supply activities. The CDD project is implemented by community-based organizations with the close support of NGOs that work on behalf of the Haitian government.

=== Venture capital ===
In May 2013 the venture capital firm Leopard Capital, through its Leopard Haiti private equity fund, announced that it intends to sell water for profit in Haiti at yet undisclosed locations and at an undisclosed price through a newly founded private company called dloHaiti. It has raised US$3.4 million with the aim to build 40 water kiosks that would use solar-powered high-tech water purification systems. The company's investors also include the International Finance Corporation's InfraVentures Fund, the Netherlands Development Finance Company (FMO), Miyamoto International, and Jim Chu, dloHaiti's CEO and Founder.

== See also ==
- Bayakou (trade)
- Disruption of the water cycle in Haiti
- Sanitation worker
