= Water supply and sanitation in Ecuador =

Data
- Access to an at least basic water source: 93% (2015)
- Access to at least basic sanitation: 86% (2015)
- Continuity of supply: 50% in urban areas
- Financing: Subsidies and loans, both internal and external

Institutions
- Decentralization to municipalities: Full
- National water and sanitation company: No
- Water and sanitation regulator: No
- Responsibility for policy setting: Ministry of Urban Development and Housing
- Sector law: No
- No. of urban service providers: 219
- No. of rural service providers: more than 5,000

Drinking water supply and sanitation in Ecuador is characterized by a number of achievements and challenges. One key achievement is a significant increase in both access to an at least basic water source (90% in 2000 to 100% in 2015 in urban areas) and at least basic sanitation (82% in 2000 to 89% in 2015 in urban areas). Significant increases in coverage in urban areas were achieved both by the public utility EMAAP-Q, serving the capital Quito, and the private concessionaire Interagua in the country's largest city Guayaquil. However, municipalities rely overwhelmingly upon central government investment, rather than recouping the costs at a local level. Another problem is intermittent water supply, which affects half of the urban areas. Also, only 8% of all collected wastewater is being treated. The level of non-revenue water is estimated at 65%, one of the highest in Latin America. Addressing these challenges is complicated by the atomization of the sector: A multitude of stakeholders – the Ministry of Housing, the Emergency Social Investment Fund, the Solidarity Fund, the State Bank, NGOs, municipalities and others – intervene in the sector. Despite the existence of an Interinstitutional Committee for Water and Sanitation there remains room to improve coordination.

== Access ==
In 2015, around 1.1 million people lacked access to "at least basic" water and around 2.2 million lacked access to "at least basic" sanitation.

In 2004, water supply coverage (piped on premises) stood at 90% in urban and 67% in rural areas while Improved sanitation coverage in 2004 was 95% of urban and 79% of rural households.

		Urban (67% of the population)	Rural (33% of the population)	Total
Water	Improved water source	100%	80%	93%
Water	Piped on Premises	93%	73%	86%
Sanitation	Improved sanitation	90%	80%	86%
Sanitation	Sewerage	72%	53%	62%

Source: Joint Monitoring Program WHO/UNICEF(JMP /2010). Data for sewerage is based on the 2003 WHO World Health Survey.

Coverage for both water and sanitation services tends to be lower at the coast and in the East than in the sierra. In addition, water supply coverage varies greatly by income, reaching about 90% for the top three income deciles in urban areas compared with levels of only about 60% for the bottom three income deciles.

== Service quality ==
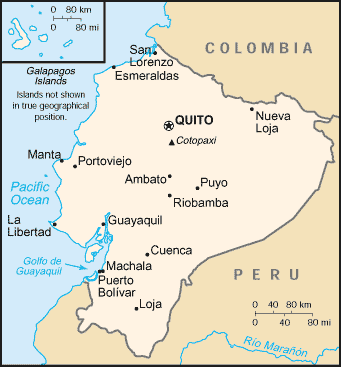
Map of Ecuador

In general, water service quality is low in Ecuador. Water supply services are interrupted in 50% of the urban areas. Water pressure is well below standard, particularly in poor outlying areas. In 30% of the urban areas, there is no treatment of drinking water. 92% of wastewater is discharged without any kind of treatment.

According to a study in 2004 about sustainability, 38% of systems in rural zones have collapsed, and 20% are seriously damaged. 29% are somewhat damaged and only 13% are considered sustainable.

== History and Recent Developments ==
Between 1965 and 1992, the Instituto Ecuatoriano de Obras Sanitarias (IEOS) or Ecuadorian Institute for Sanitary Works had been responsible for water supply and sanitation services in Ecuador.

In 1992, the sector was decentralized due to a Decentralization Law and the sector's administration was assigned to MIDUVI, which merged with the IEOS. Many municipalities, in particular small and medium-sized ones, did not dispose of enough capacity for providing water supply and sanitation services. In 2001, the national government began to support those municipalities with technical assistance through PRAGUAS (see below).

== Responsibility for water supply and sanitation ==
There are several contradictory policies on allocating the sector's resources within the country. There is no system for information, monitoring and assessment of the sector. Thus, an institutional chaos can be observed which doesn't define limits of responsibility between the institutions.

=== Policy ===
Responsibility for establishing sectoral policy is legally vested in the "Subsecretaría de Agua Potable y Saneamiento" or Subministry of Potable Water and Sanitation under the Ministry of Urban Development and Housing. However, there is no clear definition of roles and responsibilities between various national and sub-national actors, nor is there an independent regulator of water supply and sanitation services. Stakeholders in the sector include the Ecuadorian State Bank, the Fondo de Inversión Social de Emergencia (FISE) or Emergency Social Investment Fund and several governmental ministries at the national, provincial and municipal level, among others.

While Ecuador has a National Water and Sanitation Policy, Política Nacional de Agua y Saneamiento under Executive Decree No. 2766 of 30 July 2002 it is set out in relatively vague terms and avoids a clear position on sensitive issues such as investment subsidies (by national and sub-national governments) and who should receive them.

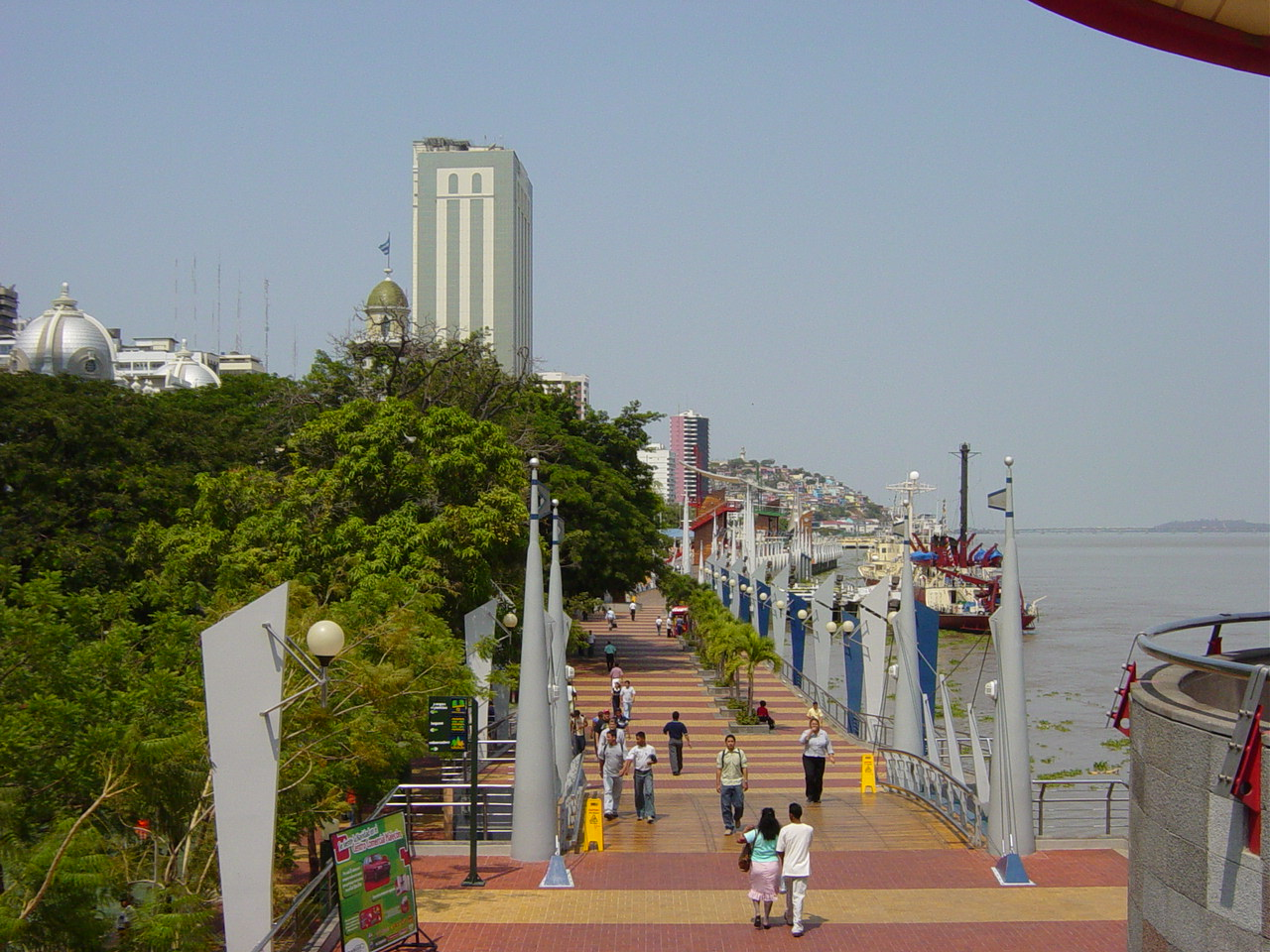
Malecón 2000, next to Guayas river

A draft plan for a Water and Sanitation Sector Law was prepared, but has not yet been presented to Congress, given unstable political conditions.

An Interinstitutional Committee for Water and Sanitation acts as a forum for interchanging experiences in collaboration with MIDUVI.

=== Service Provision ===
In urban areas, municipalities are directly responsible for delivering the services. They can provide it themselves or through an autonomous municipal utility. In the capital Quito, water and sanitation services in the city itself and the rural parts of the municipality (canton) are provided by the metropolitan utility Empresa Metropolitana de Alcantarillado y Agua Potable de Quito (EMAAP-Q). In Guayaquil, the service was transferred to the private company Interagua under a concession in 2001. At the same time, the former municipal utility ECAPAG became the regulatory agency for the new private utility.

In rural areas, more than 5,000 Potable Water Boards provide the services. Most of them are left to their fate in abandoned conditions, due to very low tariff levels, negligence of care of the water sources and lack of an institution helping water boards since the dissolution of IEOS in 1992.

== Efficiency ==
Potable water supply efficiency is usually measured through labour productivity and the level of unaccounted-for water. In terms of manpower, the best practices of the region reflect less than 3 employees per 1000 connections. In less populated areas, it can be difficult to determine the number of employees per connection, as services are often bundled by the government with other civic services, but the World Bank estimates that the number of employees per connection exceeds this in medium-sized towns, with somewhere between 5 and 14 employees assigned per 1000 connections.

Non-revenue water, which is the difference between produced and invoiced water is also difficult to guess, given low measuring levels in Ecuador. However, at the end of 2001 it was estimated at 65%, one of the highest levels in Latin America.

== Financial aspects ==
=== Tariffs, Cost Recovery and Affordability ===
A study commissioned by the government under financing by the World Bank concluded that nationwide, tariffs covered only about 2/3 of system operation and maintenance costs in 2001. National and sub-national (provincial and municipal) government transfers are required to cover the operation and maintenance gap and to finance coverage expansion.

Concerning the affordability of tariffs and ability to pay of user, in 1998 households that indicated expenses for water in the national living standards measurement survey, stated that on average they stood at 1.7% of their total expenses. This percentage is higher in urban areas (1.9%) than in rural communities with some basic infrastructure (rural amanzanado - 1.3%) and rural areas with scattered population (rural disperso - 0.9%). Within the poorest decile, this percentage is 1.9% on national average, but 3.3% in urban areas. The expenses include water which is bought from water tankers, but excludes expenses for sanitation.

=== Investment and financing ===
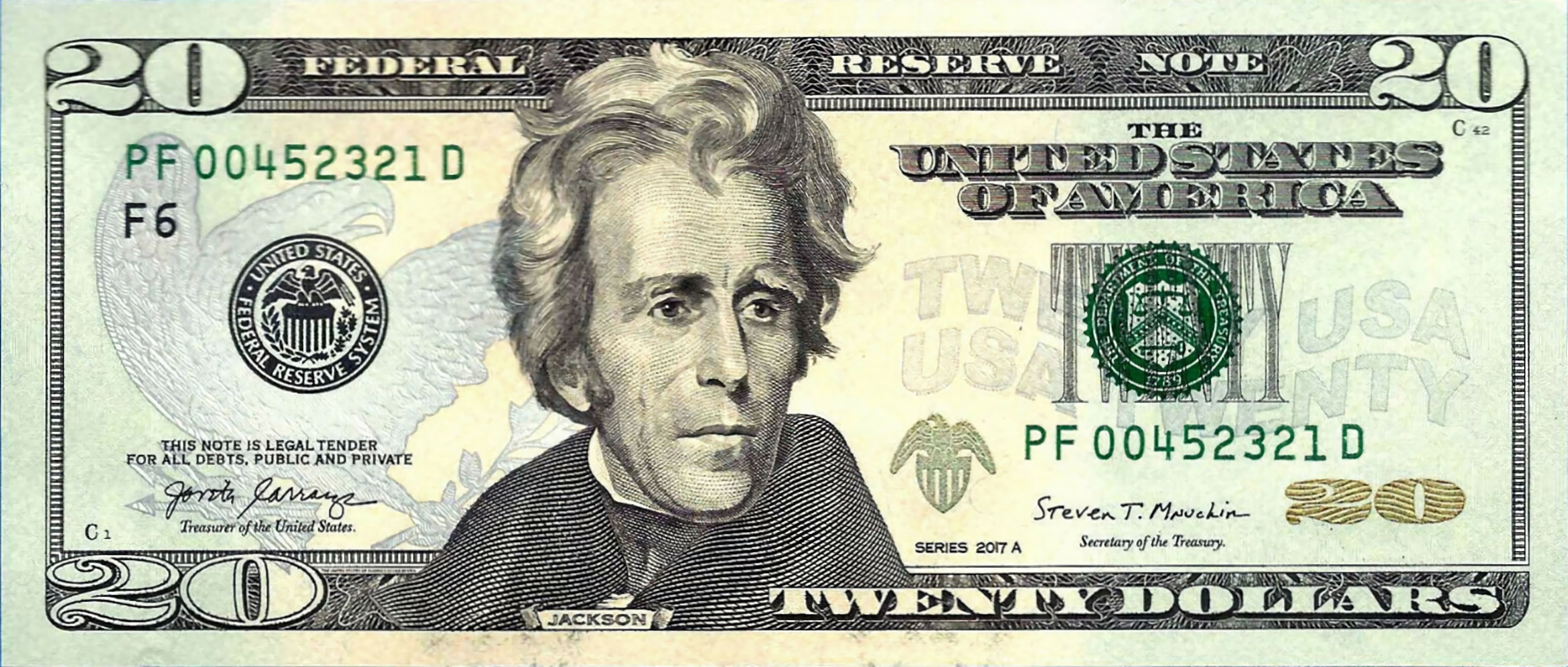
Since Dollarization in 2000, the US dollar is the official currency of Ecuador

Financing for urban and rural water supply investments is provided by a multitude of national and sub-national actors under different terms and conditions. Some favour participation by users and municipalities, but the majority provide assistance without requiring any contributions (assistencialismo) in a clientelistic manner, underestimating the importance of participation to reach sustainability of services.

In 2001, an Executive Decree was adopted by the government which created correlation between a tax on telephone calls and government transfers of funds for water and sanitary improvement to municipalities. The level of the transfers is higher for poorer municipalities, and – most notably – higher for those that improve operator performance or choose to delegate service provision to autonomous operators. The system of sub-national transfers thus provides incentives to improve both performance and more sustainable institutional arrangements at the local level.

From 1990 to 2005, US$409 million were invested in water supply and sanitation at the municipal level. As shown above, the funding reached its peak in 2002, when US$6.1 per capita were spent. However, the average investment p.a. was at only US$2.1 Compared to other Latin American states like its neighboring countries Peru and Colombia, the investment level in Ecuador is low.

== Success stories ==
=== EMAAP-Q, the public enterprise serving Quito ===
The public water and sewer utility of Quito, EMAAP-Q, was turned around between 2000 and 2008, according to its general manager, Juan Neira. In this period water coverage in the city increased from 72% to 98% and sanitation coverage from 68% to 93%. A multistakeholder Fund for Water (FONAG) introduced innovative financing mechanisms to help protect watershed supply regions, promote conservation, and encourage public participation in valuing clean water. The company replaced its cumbersome manual billing system with an electronic billing system in 2008 under which an inspector, equipped with a portable computer, visit homes to read water consumption meters and immediately types and delivers the bill to users. Non-revenue water is said to have been reduced from 47.8% in 2000 to 30% in 2008 through the installation of household meters and the reduction of clandestine water connections. However, the performance indicators on the EMAAP-Q website show that non-revenue water was 38% in 2002 and 37% in 2006, with not data for subsequent years. Investments were financed by the Inter-American Development Bank under a US$170m project that closed in 2002, CAF – Development Bank of Latin America and the Caribbean under a US$25m project that was under execution in 2009 and company funds. According to its website, the firm has obtained international awards for administrative excellence and the quality of services, such as the gold medal of excellence by the Corporación Ecuatoriana de Calidad Total in 2007 and the Arch of Europe International Quality Award for Technology in 2008, without specifying the details of the awards. In April 2009 there was, however, no independent confirmation of these awards on the Internet. The company showed an operating loss before interest of US$5.5m in January–February 2009, and needed a government transfer of US$6.3m in the same period to balance its books.

=== Interagua, the private concessionnaire serving Guayaquil ===
In Guayaquil, the largest port city in Ecuador, the services were transferred to a private operator, Interagua, in 2001. At that time, 50% of the city had only 10 hours service per day. In five years the company brought 24 hours service to all the city and served an additional 55,000 families, mostly low income in the southern part of the city. Access to water supply increased from 64 percent in 2000 to 72 percent in 2003, and access to sewerage has grown from 46 percent to 55 percent during the same period. Families were able to consume twice as much water while paying one fifth of what they paid before, when they bought it from vendors distributing it in tankers and charging $3.50 per cubic meter. Interagua charges only 34 cents per cubic meter for the first 15 cubic meters per month.

== External support ==
The Ecuadorian government receives external support from several donors in terms of investment and technical assistance in water supply and sanitation.

=== World Bank ===
In recent years, the World Bank has intensely participated in the development of key documents about Ecuadorian policies, including national policy of water and sanitation in 2002 and the innovative decree about transfers to the water supply and sanitation sector of 2005 as well as the draft plan for a Water and Sanitation Sector Law.

The World Bank Group contributed to the PRAGUAS project with a loan of US$48 million, paid by the International Bank for Reconstruction and Development.

==== Rural and Small Towns Water Supply and Sanitation Project II (PRAGUAS) ====
Since 2001, the Proyecto de Agua Potable y Saneamiento para Comunidades Rurales y Pequeños Municipios (PRAGUAS or Rural and Small Towns Water Supply and Sanitation Project) became the government's primary instrument to face the sector's challenges, influencing key options about policy (see above), extending coverage and giving incentives to improve quality, efficiency and cost recovery of the service.

To satisfy requirements of quality, efficiency and cost recovery, PRAGUAS offers technical assistance and financial incentives to municipalities which are interested in delegating water supply and sanitation to autonomous operators, such as public or private utilities, cooperatives etc.

Referring to coverage, between 2001 and 2006 PRAGUAS I equipped 252,000 persons with new supply systems and 127,000 people with on-site sanitation (i.e., approximately 5% and 3% of the Ecuadorian rural population of 4.7 million people). In small towns (cabeceras cantonales), where water service was interrupted, technical assistance was provided to improve the performance, separating service provision from direct provision by municipalities and increasing operative efficiency, to reach continuous sustainable service of good quality. As designs for more than 600,000 inhabitants (which is 13% of the Ecuadorian rural population) had already been prepared, a fast coverage expansion was expected within PRAGUAS II, which began in 2007 and lasted until 2011.

During PRAGUAS I, among the country's 219 municipalities, 29 have decided to adopt new service models that are different from direct provision by municipalities. 14 have completed the transition process, exceeding the aim of APL-1 (Adaptable Program Loan) of five municipalities, which was established by the World Bank and the national government in 2000. An initial assessment shows that the first group of municipalities, which have delegated their water supply and sanitation services, like Cayambe (municipal company), Pedro Moncayo (municipal company, privately operated), Pujilí (municipal company), Guaranda (municipal company), Caluma (mixed company) and Echeandía (cooperative) have significantly increased their operative efficiency and raised tariffs to at least cover their operation and maintenance costs.

The second stage, called APL-2/PRAGUAS II was approved by the World Bank's board on July 25, 2006. PRAGUAS II is expected to provide the following benefits: i) support for consolidating the framework of incentives for investments in water supply and sanitation, as well as technical assistance to present a Water Law to the congress and the relevant regulations for its application; ii) A group of complementary activities to extend coverage under a demand-driven approach, enhancing hygiene benefits due to the new infrastructure and offering support to water boards aimed at strengthening the system's sustainability; iii) technical assistance and investment financing to improve quality, efficiency and cost recovery of water supply and sanitation services and management of solid waste in small towns; and iv) a communication program to develop support for sector reform.

Until 2011, PRAGUAS II is expected to provide water supply and/or sanitation for 405,000 inhabitants in rural areas, such as the efficient water supply for 220,000 people in small towns and sanitation managed by delegated operators for 120,000 persons. All service provision is done with a demand driven approach, respecting gender, interculturality and environmental care, thus aiming at an effective and sustainable use of the services.

=== Interamerican Development Bank (IDB) ===
The Interamerican Development Bank supported investments in the three largest cities of the country - Quito, Guayaquil and Cuenca - through ten programs with a total amount of US$400 million. In 2006, the IDB approved a new loan in the amount of US$62.25 million for the town of Cuenca.

=== European Union ===
PASSE is a program of the Health Ministry for the provinces of the central sierra region, which has received a grant from the European Union.

=== Belgium ===
Since 2003, the Belgian government has supported the Agua Potable para la Sierra Norte (APOSINO) or Potable Water for the Northern Sierra region, which is a technical assistance program in the provinces of Imbabura and Carchi.

=== International Organization for Migration ===
The International Organization for Migration (IOM) carries out a development program in rural areas and small towns in the northern region of Ecuador, called Northern Border Development Program. The program is financed by USAID, which has invested US$63m from 2001 to 2007.

=== CARE ===
The humanitarian organization CARE is working in 15 Ecuadorian provinces, concentrating on rural areas and especially on projects close to the northern and the southern border. CARE works closely with the municipalities. In the last 10 years, CARE has contributed to significantly increasing water coverage under a sustainability-driven approach.

=== Small NGOs ===
Numerous small non-governmental organizations (NGOs), such as Water Ecuador (formerly known as Agua Muisne), Fundacion Yanapuma, and Eden's Rose have addressed the issue of drinking water and sanitation on a local level and have worked with many rural coastal and Andean communities in Ecuador to develop water and sanitation programs where several of the larger organizations listed above have not yet reached.

== See also ==
- ETAPA, public utilities company of the city of Cuenca
- Environment of Ecuador
