= Water supply and sanitation in Uruguay =

Data
- Water coverage (broad definition): 100%
- Sanitation coverage (broad definition): 100%
- Continuity of supply: 100%
- Average urban water use (L/person/day): 183
- Average urban water and sanitation tariff (US$/m^{3}): 22/month (2007)
- Share of household metering: 93%
- Share of self-financing by utilities: None

Institutions
- Decentralization to municipalities: None
- National water and sanitation company: Yes
- Water and sanitation regulator: Yes, multi-sector
- Responsibility for policy setting: Ministry of Housing, Land Management and Environment
- Sector law: None
- No. of urban service providers: 1

Uruguay is the only country in Latin America that has achieved quasi-universal coverage of access to safe drinking water supply and adequate sanitation. Water service quality is considered good, with practically all localities in Uruguay receiving disinfected water on a continuous basis. 70% of wastewater collected by the national utility was treated. Given these achievements, the government's priority is to improve the efficiency of services and to expand access to sewerage, where appropriate, in areas where on-site sanitation is used.

The stability of the water supply in Uruguay was severely challenged by a three year drought culminating in a water crises in 2022-2023. The La Niña driven cycle of drought, amplified by increased heatwaves caused by climate change meant that overuse of water by consumers stressed capacity of the system, leading to use of saltwater in drinking water.

== Access ==
Water and sanitation coverage in Uruguay (2004)

		Urban (93% of the population)	Rural (7% of the population)	Total
Water	Broad definition	100%	100%	100%
Water	House connections	97%	84%	96%
Sanitation	Broad definition	100%	99%	100%
Sanitation	Sewerage	81%	42%	78%

Source: WHO/UNICEF Joint Monitoring Programme (JMP /2006). Data for water and sanitation based on the WHO World Health Survey (2003).

== Water use ==
Per capita water production is high at 411 liter/capita/day (90.4 Imperial gallons/c/d, 108.6 US gallons/c/d). Even after taking into account non-revenue water of 54%, at 183 liter/capita/day (40.3 Imperial gallons/c/d, 48.3 US gallons/c/d) it is still higher than in many European countries. However, water use is much lower than in neighboring Argentina, where metering is not widespread, while in Uruguay 96% of water connections were metered in 2004.

== History and recent developments ==
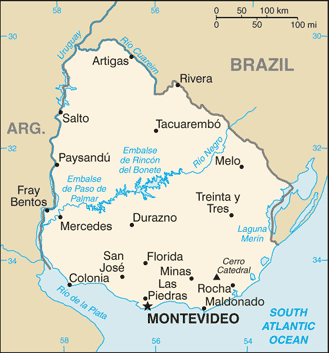
Source: CIA World Factbook

Like many other developing countries Uruguay sought private sector participation in water supply and sanitation to improve efficiency and service quality. This was done through two concessions for secondary cities in the department of Maldonado, home to many tourist resorts and the town Punta del Este. The first concession was granted in 1993 to Aguas de la Costa, a Uruguayan firm which later became majority-owned by Aguas de Barcelona, itself a subsidiary of the French firm Suez. The second concession was granted in 2000 to URAGUA, a subsidiary of Aguas de Bilbao of Spain.

To complement the policy of private sector participation, the government created in 2002 the utility regulatory agency URSEA covering the power and water sector.

Nevertheless, the private concessions remained contentious. Following a vigorous campaign against them and allegations of overcharging and poor service quality, Parliament passed a constitutional amendment in October 2004 prohibiting any form of private sector participation in the water sector. As a result, the concession of URAGUA was withdrawn in the same year.

In 2005 the government passed law 17.930 with the objective of improving the effective participation of users and civil society in planning, management and control of activities in the sector. For that purpose the law established a water and sanitation directorate (DINASA) in the Ministry of Housing and Environment, as well as a Water and Sanitation Advisory Commission (COASAS).

Meanwhile, the Uruguayan and foreign owners of Aguas de la Costa refused to yield to demands for nationalization. In 2006 the government bought the shares held by Aguas de Barcelona. From then on the enterprise operated as a mixed public-private enterprise with a majority public shareholding. In 2009 the company became 100% owned by the state.

=== 2022–2023 crises ===
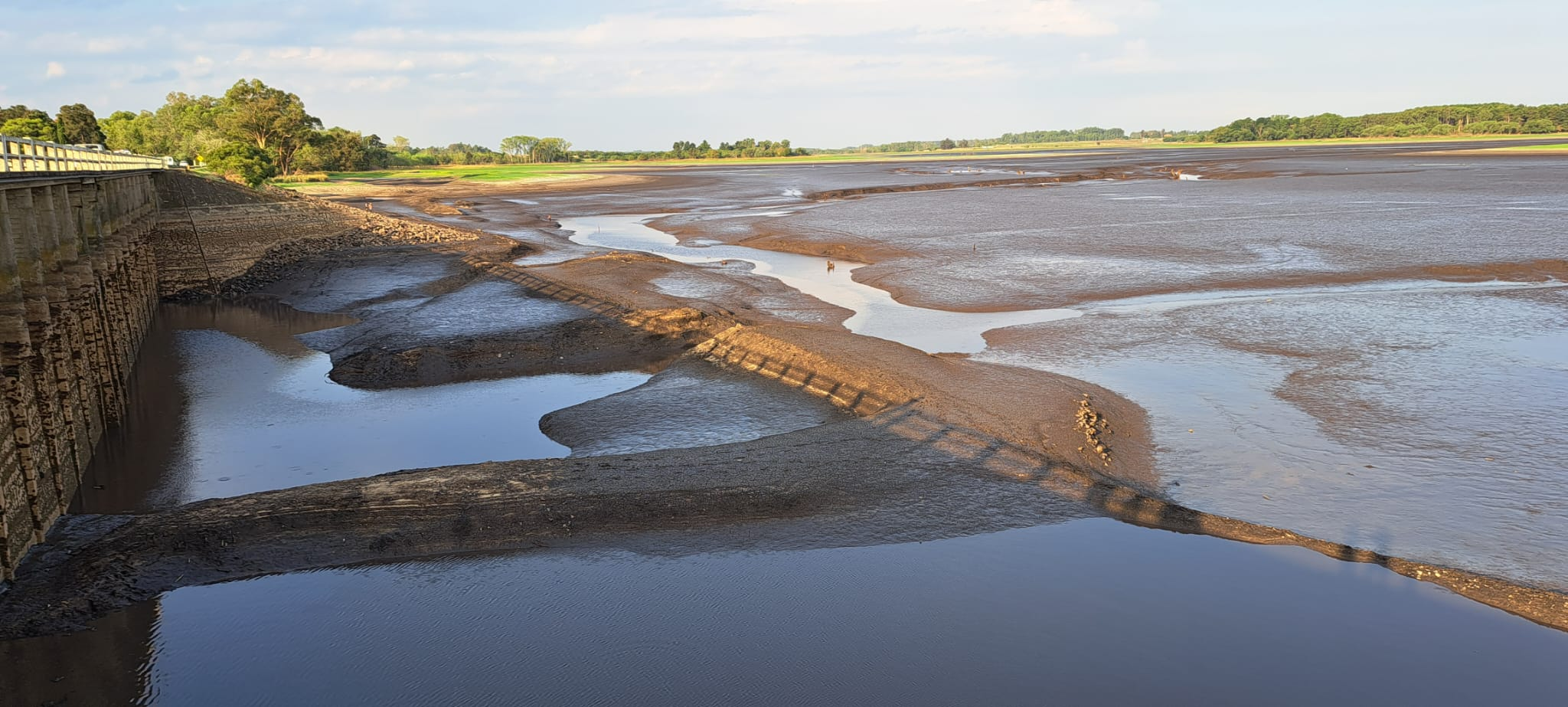
The Canelón Grande Reservoir, one of the main water supplies for Montevideo ran completely dry in March 2023.

The drought or water crisis in Uruguay from 2022 to 2023 was an event of abnormally low rainfall attributed to the La Niña phenomenon, which had major effects in Uruguayan economy and water supply.

The peak of the crisis occurred during the winter of 2023, when the reservoirs that supplied drinking water to the Montevideo metropolitan area ran almost completely dry. The Santa Lucía River, which supplies drinking water to almosts 2/3 of the Uruguayan population, reduced its volume significantly allowing brackish water to flow upstream and reach the water treatment plant of Aguas Corrientes, this caused major disruptions when such brackish water had to be distributed to the cities. The Uruguayan government then began notifying daily about the sodium and chloride concentrations measured in the water supply and the volume of water left in storage at the Paso Severino Reservoir.

The water shortage resulted in significant impacts on the local economy, and large portions of the population not having direct access to drinkable water.

While the drought began in 2018, the situation significantly deteriorated in early 2023, affecting more than 60% of Uruguay's territory with extreme or severe drought conditions between October 2022 and February 2023. Precipitation during this period was below average. This prolonged drought led to agricultural losses exceeding $1 billion and complications in the availability of drinking water. By the end of January 2023, before the water crisis in the metropolitan area, the drought had already impacted 75,000 people across five departments in the country's interior.

To address this crisis, the national government declared a state of agricultural emergency in October 2022, extending until the end of April 2023. The drought resulted in reduced access to drinking water and financial losses for agricultural producers. Following a lack of reduction of water usage and a lack of projected rainfall, the national water management authority started using brackish water in municipal water supply for 60% of the population in May 2023. The water had twice the level of salinity recommend by WHO.

== Responsibility for water supply and sanitation ==
The state-owned national utility, Administración de las Obras Sanitarias del Estado (OSE) provides water and sewer services to all of Uruguay with the exception of Montevideo, where the municipality provides sewerage and OSE provides water services only. OSE serves 330 localities with 2.8 million inhabitants with water services and 152 localities with 0.5 million inhabitants with sewer services. It had 4,362 employees in 2004.

To enhance sector performance, new institutions have been recently established, including the Regulatory Entity for Energy and Water (URSEA); the National Directorate of Water and Sanitation (DINASA) in the Ministry of Housing, Land Management and Environment, responsible for creating national sector policies on WSS; and the Advisory Commission on Water and Sanitation (COASAS).

The government of Uruguay intends to establish a comprehensive legal and regulatory framework for the water supply and sanitation sector through a new law. It also plans to develop a policy on appropriate sanitation standards and to further improve the efficiency of OSE by stimulating internal competition and reducing unaccounted for water. Concerning internal competition, OSE has introduced an internal benchmarking system comparing the utility's performance across 21 cities based on 9 service quality indicators.

== Economic efficiency ==
Between 1999 and 2005 OSE successfully increased labor productivity from 5.6 employees/1000 connections to 4.5, decreased operating costs from US$0.98/m^{3} (US$0.75/cu yd) to US$0.71/m^{3} (US$0.54/cu yd); and increased operating margins from 35% to 42%. However, OSE's performance continues to present areas of inefficiency. Reducing unaccounted for water, which remains around 54%, will continue to require a concerted effort.

== Financial aspects ==
=== Tariffs and affordability ===
Water and sewer tariffs charged by OSE differ depending on the category of users, with lower tariffs for residential users than for other users (commercial, industrial, official and public enterprises). Water and sewer tariffs in Uruguay have increased substantially since 1995. For example, a typical residential water bill (20 m^{3}/month, 700 cu ft/month) for OSE consumers increased from the equivalent of 56 pesos/month (US$9.50) in 1995 to 207 pesos/month (US$18.20) in 2001, a 93% increase in US dollar terms in six years. Tariffs were further increased so that a typical residential bill reached 431 pesos/month in 2003. But due to the massive devaluation of 2001 the US dollar equivalent of the monthly bill decreased to US$15/month. In 2007 a monthly residential water bill was estimated to be at least 568 pesos, equivalent to more than US$22/month.

Given that the average monthly income of a household in the two lowest-income quintiles (a lower-middle income family) was about the equivalent of US$190 in 2003, water and sewer tariffs accounted for almost 8% of their income, an extraordinarily high percentage, which has probably further increased since then.

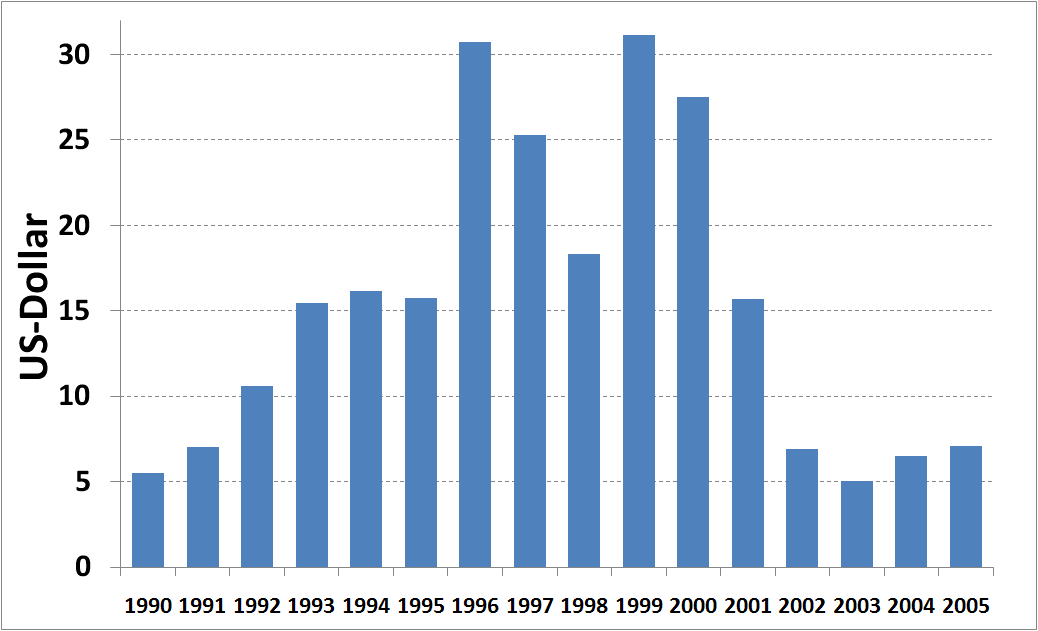
Spending of OSE per capita from 1990 to 2005 in constant US dollars of 2006

=== Investments and financing ===
The national water and sewer company Administración de las Obras Sanitarias del Estado (OSE), created in 1952, does not receive direct subsidies from the government. OSE finances its investments from internal revenues and loans. However, OSE's financial health had been in decline during the 1990s and early 2000 due to high levels of operational inefficiency, thereby threatening OSE's ability to carry out future required investments. OSE's operating performance and financial health have since begun improving.

The total expenditure of OSE between 1990 and 2005 was US$797 million, which is on annual average 0.24% of the Uruguayan GDP or US$15.3 per capita. The annual investment was highest at the end of the 1990s, reaching US$30.8 in 1996 and US$31.2 per capita in 1999. Since 2001, it fell back to only US$5.1 per capita in 2003. The average annual investment per capita between 1997 and 2003 was higher than in other Latin American countries like Argentina, Peru, Colombia and Mexico.

== External support ==
=== World Bank ===
- OSE Modernization & Systems Rehabilitation Project APL-2
