= Water supply and sanitation in Panama =

Data
- Access to an improved water source: 93% (2009)
- Access to improved sanitation: 69% (2009)
- Share of collected wastewater treated: Low
- Continuity of supply: High
- Average urban water and sanitation tariff (US$/m^{3}): 0.26 (Panama City in 2012)
- Share of household metering: 51% (2006)
- Annual investment in WSS: High
- Financing: mostly through government subsidies

Institutions
- Decentralization to municipalities: Very limited (one municipality)
- National water and sanitation company: Yes: IDAAN
- Water and sanitation regulator: Yes: ANSP (multi-sectoral)
- Responsibility for policy setting: Ministry of Health
- Sector law: Yes (1997)
- No. of urban service providers: 2: IDAAN and Boquete
- No. of rural service providers: 3,300

Water supply and sanitation in Panama is characterized by relatively high levels of access compared to other Latin American countries. However, challenges remain, especially in rural areas. Panama has a tropical climate and receives abundant rainfall (up to 3000mm per year), yet the country still suffers from limited water access and pollution. Intense El Niño periods, periodic droughts, reduce water availability. Multiple factors like urbanization, impacts of climate change, and economic development have decreased water resources. The high frequency of floods in recent years and the lack of corresponding measures resulted in tension among the local population. Rapid population growth in recent decades led to an unprecedented increase in freshwater demand. Regional inequality exists in water resources and water governance. An estimated 7.5-31% of Panama's population lives in isolated rural areas with minimal access to potable water and few sewage treatment facilities.

Given the large quantities of rainfall, rainwater harvesting has been implemented as a solution to increase water access. Still, the rainwater is subject to pick up any substances on the rooftops that it runs over before entering a collection tank. Water quality tests revealed that the collected water often contains coliforms or fecal coliforms, likely from running through animal droppings on roofs.

The Bocas del Toro province gets its water from a body of water named Big Creek. Although the water goes through a purification process, the treatment infrastructure was built to accommodate a much lower water demand than what is currently expected of it. Waterborne diseases are still a prominent problem for Bocas del Toro, with diarrhea, intestinal problems, and parasitosis being the leading causes for infant mortality in the province.

== Access ==
According to the Ministry of Health, in 2006 97% had access to potable water and also 97% had access to at least basic sanitation. WHO's and UNICEF's Joint Monitoring Program (JMP) estimates access to improved water supply in 2004 at 97% in urban areas and 82% in rural areas, while access to improved sanitation was 75% in urban areas and 50% in rural areas. The table below is updated with 2009 JMP data for water and sanitation coverage.

		Urban (74% of the population)	Rural (26% of the population)	Total
Water	Improved water source	97%	83%	93%
Water	Piped on Premises	93%	79%	89%
Sanitation	Improved sanitation	75%	51%	69%

Source: Joint Monitoring Program WHO/UNICEF(JMP /2009).

== Service quality ==
Despite a lack of statistical data about water quality and continuity of supply, potable water is perceived to be of good quality in Panama and most users receive continuous service.

== Responsibility for water supply and sanitation ==
Responsibilities for the sector are allocated by the Panamanian Water Law, which was approved in 1997. As of 2016, the government considered reforming the water sector. by breaking up IDAAN into municipal-level service companies.

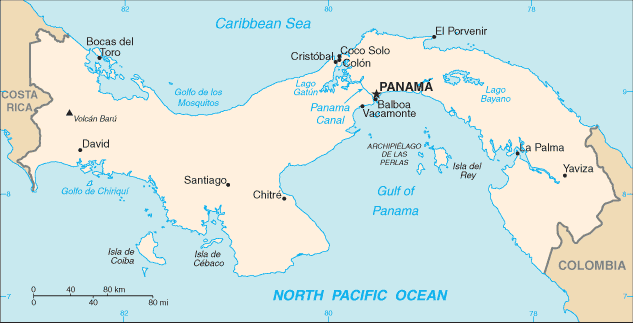
A map of Panama.

=== Policy and regulation ===
The Panamanian Health Ministry is responsible for defining the sector's policy, whereas the Autoridad Nacional de los Servicios Públicos ASEP or National Authority for Public Services acts as regulatory agency.

Responsibility for water resources is vested in two institutions: The Autoridad Nacional del Ambiente or National Environment Authority and the Autoridad del Canal de Panamá or Panama Canal Authority.

=== Service provision ===
According to the Water Law, the Instituto de Acueductos y Alcantarillados Nacionales (IDAAN) is responsible for water and sanitation services in urban areas with more than 1,500 inhabitants, thus preventing decentralization to municipalities. The only exception is the municipality of Boquete, which manages its own water supply and sanitation system.

There are approximately 3,300 water supply systems in rural areas, of which 1,800 are managed by Juntas Administrativas de Acueductos Rurales (JAARs) or Rural Water Boards. The remaining are managed by Health Committees.

== History and recent developments ==
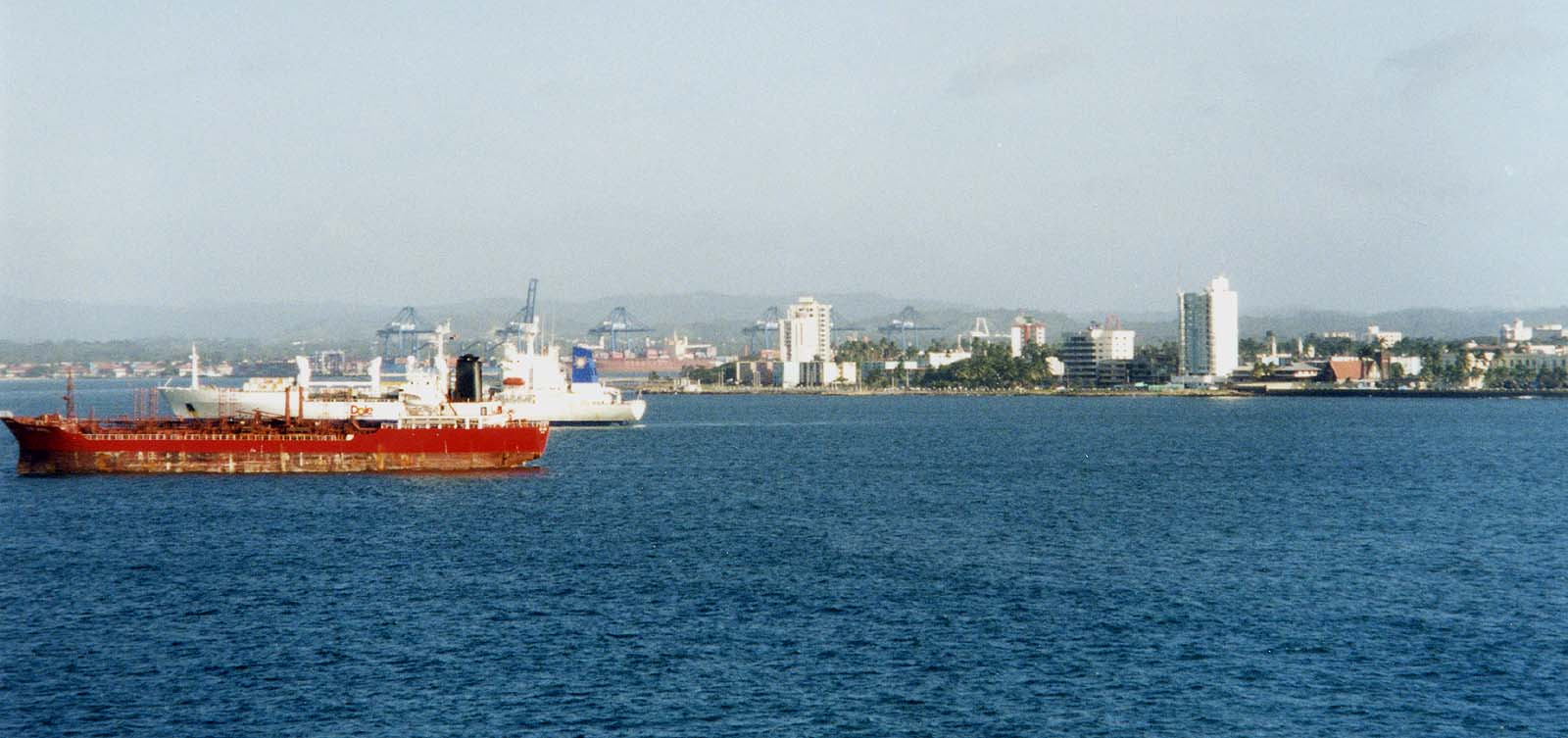
Colón, Panama.

IDAAN was created in 1961 and was made responsible for investments in water supply in urban areas and a significant increase in coverage of potable water and - to a lesser extent - sanitation. The institution disposed of high financial capacities and human resources during its first decades. However, IDAAN's financial situation deteriorated significantly due to the absence of any tariff increase until 1982.

To face up IDAAN's weakness, its privatization was proposed at the end of the 1990s, following the telecommunications and electricity sector. At the same time, an agency for economic regulation of public services was created, which is now the ANSP. In 1997, a Water Law was adopted, defining the regulatory and institutional framework for water supply and sanitation.

Privatization was abandoned until a change of government in 1999. Under Mireya Moscoso's administration, Law 77 was approved to modify the Water Law, permitting privatization and strengthening IDAAN. To significantly increase IDAAN's investments in urban areas, the government decided in 2003 to use financial resources earned through the telecommunication and electricity companies' privatization.

In 2006, the government of Martín Torrijos established the Programa de Desarrollo Comunitario para Infraestructura Pública (PRODEC) or Community Development for Public Infrastructure Program (see below).

== Tariffs and cost recovery ==
Neither the tariffs of IDAAN, nor rural tariffs are sufficiently high to cover investment costs. In 2011 IDAAN incurred operating costs (including depreciation) of 131 million Balboas (one Balboa equals one US dollar) and had operating revenues of only 104 million Balboas, resulting in an operating deficit of 27 million Balboas. This was the second-highest annual operating deficit since 1994. Prior to 1994 IDAAN had a small operating surplus in most years. The tariff structure does not provide incentives to save water. Since half of urban and almost all rural users don't dispose of water meters, those users do not receive bills based on consumption.

Those who have meters pay a fixed tariff for the first 8,000 gallons (30 cubic meters) each month in Panama City and for 6,000 gallons (23 cubic meters) in other cities and towns. These consumption levels are far above a basic water need of 50 liter per capita per day which corresponds to 6 cubic meters per month for a family of four. In 2012 the monthly residential water and sewer bill for a consumption of 30 cubic meters was 7.92 Balboas in Panama City (0.26 Cents per cubic meter) and 6.56 Balboas in other cities (0.29 Cents per cubic meter). This compares to US$3 per cubic meter for residential water use in, for example, Chicago.

As of 2016, water users had accumulated substantial arrears in water bill payments to IDAAN. The utility is owed US$104 million in past-due bills, of which US$79 million is from residential customers, US$16 million from public agencies and US$10 million from businesses. IDAAN has disconnected many customers in an effort to secure payments.

== Investment and financing ==
In 2005, IDAAN invested US$49m in urban areas. FIS and MINSA invested a much lower amount in rural areas. The bulk of investments was in water supply, while much less was invested in sanitation. PRODEC aims at investing US$100m of the Panama Canal's gains into community infrastructure, including water supply and sanitation. The use of these funds is decided on a participatory basis through consultative councils at the local level. Furthermore, the National Investment Fund invests in potable water, in particular in rural areas.

== External support ==
The World Bank supports the sector through a US$32m loan for the Water Supply and Sanitation in Low-Income Communities Project which is executed by the Ministry of Health.

The Interamerican Development Bank (IDB) supports the sector through various projects. The US$45m Panama City and Bay of Panama Sanitation Project, approved in 2006 and executed by the Ministry of Health, supports the extension of the capital's sanitation network. The sustainable development projects in Darién Province and Bocas del Toro Province include support of water supply and sanitation systems.

The Japanese Overseas Economic Cooperation Fund (OECF) supports sanitation in the city and the bay of Panama through a loan for constructing a sewage plant.

The European Investment Bank (EIB) approved a loan to support sanitation in Panama City in 2007.

== Sources ==
- IDAAN, Statistical Bulletins 2006-2001 (in Spanish)
- World Bank: Panama Public Expenditure Review, 2006
