= Water supply and sanitation in Venezuela =

Data
- Access to an improved water source: 93% (2015)
- Access to an at least basic water source: 76.7% (2022)
- Access to improved sanitation: 94% (2015)
- Share of collected wastewater treated: 33% (2008)
- Average urban water use (L/person/day): 450 (2008)
- Average urban water and sanitation tariff (US$/m^{3}): 0.41 (in Caracas, 2010)
- Share of household metering: 36% (2008)
- Annual investment in WSS: US$5/person (1997–2001)
- Financing: Mainly through government subsidies

Institutions
- Decentralization to municipalities: Partial
- National water and sanitation company: Yes (Holding company)
- Water and sanitation regulator: De iure yes, de facto no
- Responsibility for policy setting: Ministry of Environment and Natural Resources
- Sector law: Yes (2001)
- No. of urban service providers: 20
- No. of rural service providers: n/a

As of March 2026, Venezuela's water sector faces a severe crisis, with up to 80% of the population experiencing restricted, often contaminated, water access. Infrastructure decay, exacerbated by 2025 flooding, has left approximately 7.9 million people in need of humanitarian assistance for water and sanitation. You can read the full analysis at Venezuela (Bolivarian Republic of) Crisis Response Plan 2026.

== 2026 Update ==
As of 2026, water supply and sanitation in Venezuela remains in a state of "virtual collapse" following a protracted multidimensional crisis. Despite the country ranking among the top 15 globally for renewable freshwater resources, approximately 80% of Venezuelans lack continuous access to clean drinking water and basic sanitation. Service quality is characterized by severe intermittency, with many households receiving piped water only sporadically—often once a week or less—and of "dubious quality".

The sector remains highly centralized under the Ministry of the Popular Power for Water Attention (which replaced the former Ministry of Environment’s direct oversight). The national water utility, HIDROVEN, and its regional subsidiaries nominally serve 80% of the population, but operational capacity is severely limited by a lack of maintenance, an untrained workforce, and the departure of technical experts. Non-revenue water (water lost to leaks or theft) remains significantly higher than the regional average, exceeding 60%.

=== Recent Challenges (2024–2025) ===
The infrastructure's fragility was further exposed in mid-2025 when a powerful tropical wave triggered heavy rains and catastrophic flooding across 16 states, including Apure, Mérida, and Zulia. These floods affected over 370,000 people, damaged water treatment plants, and contaminated natural water sources, leading to a spike in waterborne diseases.

=== Sanitation and Wastewater ===
Sanitation coverage has stagnated, with only 26% of the population using safely managed sanitation services as of 2024. Wastewater treatment remains critically low; while it was reported at 33% in 2008, estimates for the mid-2020s suggest much of the infrastructure is non-functional. Only about 15% of collected wastewater actually undergoes treatment before being discharged into the environment.

=== Economic Impact on Consumers ===
In 2026, clean water has become a luxury item. With a basic food basket costing approximately US$586—roughly 175 times the minimum wage—poor consumers in urban 'barrios' are often forced to pay exorbitant prices to private water tankers. A single bottle of water can cost up to US$3.00, representing a significant portion of monthly income for most citizens.

=== Environmental Quality: The Orinoco and Lake Maracaibo ===
The Orinoco River, the primary water source for much of the country, continues to suffer from poor water quality due to untreated sewage and industrial runoff. In Western Venezuela, Lake Maracaibo has been described by environmental activists as an "oil pit" rather than a natural body of water, following at least 65 oil spills recorded in 2024 alone.

=== Institutional Shifts ===
Following the capture of Nicolás Maduro in January 2026 and the installation of Delcy Rodríguez as acting president, the National Assembly approved a landmark reform to the Hydrocarbons Law. While primarily focused on oil, the reform includes provisions for a sovereign fund dedicated to improving public infrastructure and services, though the immediate impact on the water sector remains to be seen amidst ongoing funding shortfalls for humanitarian WASH programs.

== Access ==
In 2015, 93% of the total population of Venezuela had access to "improved" water, or 95% of the urban population and 78% of the rural population. As for sanitation, in 2015, 94% of the total population in Venezuela had access to "improved" sanitation, or 97% of the urban population and 70% of the rural population.

The WHO/UNICEF Joint Monitoring Program's estimates from 2008 are based on the 2001 census results and show that 93% of citizens had access to potable water and 91% had access to sanitation.

A study for the Development Bank of Latin America and the Caribbean (CAF), however, estimates based on figures from the 2001 census and HIDROVEN statistics that only 82% of the population had access to an improved source of water in 2001. The same source also quotes a lower coverage figure for sanitation than the WHO (only 66%). According to the same study over 4.2 million people had no access to piped water and 8 million residents did not have access to adequate sanitary facilities in 2001.

Rural consumers are particularly under-serviced – only 66% receive potable water and 40% have access to adequate sanitation. In the period 1990–2001 the share of population with access to water supply and sanitation modestly increased from 81% to 82% for water, and 63% to 66% for sanitation.

Water and sanitation coverage in Venezuela (2005)
		Urban (93% of the population)	Rural (7% of the population)	Total
Water	Broad definition	94%	75%	93%
Water	House connections	89% (2001)	49% (2001)	
Sanitation	Broad definition	94%	57%	91%
Sanitation	Sewerage	73% (2001)	12% (2001)	

Source: WHO/UNICEF Joint Monitoring Programme (JMP/2008) and JMP country files for Venezuela. Data are based on an extrapolation of the trend between the 1991 and 2001 Censuses.

== Service quality ==
In 2001, the Instituto Nacional de Estadísticas (INE) conducted a study of the quality of water and sanitation services in the country's 335 municipalities and determined that 231 municipalities, approximately 70%, received insufficient water and sanitation services.

In 2008 about 33% of collected wastewater was treated, up from about 14% in 2003.

Water supply is not uniformly continuous and often fails to meet basic drinking water quality standards. As a result, many consumers are forced to use alternative and more expensive water sources. For example, it is common in the urban 'barrios' in central Venezuela for poor consumers to pay the equivalent of approximately US$1.90 m^{3} – much more than the tariff for water from the network – for water purchased from a tanker.

The Orinoco River (a massive river that runs throughout all of Venezuela) has poor water quality. As most of Venezuela's water comes from the Orinoco River, this poses a major threat.

== Water use ==
There are no reliable figures on water use in Venezuela given the low coverage of metering. According to one estimate, average residential water use was about 230 liters per person per day in 2004. According to another estimate it was twice as much at 450 L/person/day in 2010. In parts of Caracas water use is more than 900 L/person/day. This compares to 143 L/person/day in Brazil and 259 L/person/day in Peru.

== History and recent developments ==
Before 1991 a national state-owned enterprise, the Instituto Nacional de Obras Sanitarias (INOS), was in charge of providing water and sanitation services in Venezuela.

=== First phase of decentralization (1991–2001) ===
When INOS was dissolved under the Presidency of Carlos Andrés Pérez the intent was to decentralize service provision to the municipalities that already had the legal responsibility for service provision. However, because of the lack of capacity and resources of most municipalities, service provision in 20 out of the 23 states was temporarily entrusted to the ten regional water companies under the holding company HIDROVEN (see above). In the remaining three states services were provided by the Corporación Venezolana de Guayana (CVG).The Pérez government also launched a bid for a private concession for the water and sanitation system of Caracas in 1992. However, the bid failed for lack of interested bidders under the proposed conditions.

Beginning in 1993 some states began to play a more active role in the sector. Until 1999 five decentralized water companies were created with a strong presence of the state governments (see above under service provision). This process began in Monagas in 1993 with support from the World Bank. Some of them also signed management contracts with private operators, which led to an improvement in the performance of the water and sanitation companies.

Between 1994 and 2001 water tariffs throughout the country were increased substantially, so that the ratio of cost recovery to operating costs increased from 27% to 87%. Such a substantial real tariff increase, which apparently did not cause political turmoil, is unusual in developing countries. However, the increase in tariffs was not paralleled by improvement in services. According to the IDB sector performance even deteriorated in this period.

The decentralization process remained very slow. Some municipalities refused to receive the service responsibility unless systems would be modernized, but a mechanism to finance the necessary investments was lacking. About 80% of the population thus continued to be served by HIDROVEN and its subsidiaries, and the slowness of the decentralization process consolidated institutions that were meant to be only temporary.

=== New sector law and second phase of decentralization (since 2001) ===
In December 2001 the Government of Hugo Chávez passed a new Water and Sanitation Law (Ley Orgánica para la Prestación de los Servicios de Agua Potable y Saneamiento). This law was not passed by Parliament. Instead, together with 45 other laws it was passed by the Executive based on an Enabling Act that temporarily gave the President powers to enact laws and bypass Parliament.

The law aimed at reforming the institutional structure of the sector through:

- the actual transfer of the responsibility for service provision to the municipalities through the creation of decentralized service providers – Business Units or Unidades de Gestión (UGs) – each of which would serve several municipalities;
- the creation of a regulatory agency (Superintendencia Nacional de los Servicios de Agua Potable y de Saneamiento – SUNSAPS), to oversee the implementation of the Law, regulate tariffs and subsidies, and develop a monitoring system for the sector;
- the establishment of a policy making and financing body for the sector (Oficina Nacional para el Desarrollo de los Servicios de Agua Potable y Saneamiento, ONDESAPS), whose primary responsibilities would be the management of a funding mechanism for targeted sector investments, policy formulation and facilitation of the provision of technical assistance to decentralized service providers including guidance on the establishment of decentralized service providers;
- the creation of a national bulk water company to operate and expand regional water infrastructure; and
- the establishment of a sector financing fund to channel public resources to the sector under a consistent policy framework.

According to the law HIDROVEN had to complete the transfer within no more than five years from the publication of the law, i.e. until December 2006. However, the transfer has been very slow and the deadline has not been met. Only in a few regions the decentralization to municipalities has advanced, notably in the State of Guárico where HIDROPAEZ, one of the regional utilities under the umbrella of HIDROVEN, is in the process of being replaced by five business units. The Government has also completed studies on the formation of business units in the states of Cojedes, Carabobo and Aragua. Furthermore, the national institutions foreseen by the law so far have not been created. The Ministry of Environment and HIDROVEN thus continue to undertake the national-level functions that the 2001 law had assigned to the new institutions.

In February 2003 tariffs were frozen at the national level through an executive decree. This is in direct contradiction with the 2001 law that stipulates the principle of cost recovery and assigns the responsibility to set tariffs to the municipalities.

== Responsibility for water supply and sanitation ==
=== Policy and regulation ===
The Ministry of Environment and Natural Resources is in charge of setting water and sanitation policies in Venezuela, in line with overall government policies. There is a Vice-ministry of Water within the Ministry and as of August 2007 the Vice-Minister was Cristóbal Francisco Ortiz. HIDROVEN is under the authority of this Ministry. The Ministry of Industry and Commerce sets maximum allowable tariffs in the sector.

=== Service provision ===

Water and sanitation services in Venezuela are provided by the national water company HIDROVEN, five state water companies, the Corporación Venezolana de Guayana (CVG), a few municipalities and community-based organizations.

According to the Municipal Law (Ley Orgánica de Régimen Municipal) service provision is a responsibility of the country's 335 municipalities, which own the water and sanitation infrastructure and in principle also set water and sanitation tariffs. However, in practice only few municipalities have the capacity and resources to fulfill these responsibilities.

==== HIDROVEN ====
In practice service provision in most urban areas of Venezuela is the responsibility of one of ten regional utilities (Empresas Hidrologicas Regionales) affiliated with the Compañía Anónima Hidrológica de Venezuela (HIDROVEN), a state-owned enterprise. Each regional utility covers between one and three of the country's 23 states. The responsibility for setting tariffs within the maximum levels set by the national government is shared between the regional companies and the municipalities.

Some of the bulk water supply infrastructure which provides water to municipal and state water companies is owned directly by HIDROVEN and its affiliated regional companies.

==== Corporación Venezolana de Guayana ====
In the region of Guayana, covering the states of Bolivar, Amazonas and Delta Amacuro, water and sanitation services in urban areas are provided by the Corporación Venezolana de Guayana (CVG), a conglomerate with its main activities in mining.

==== State water companies ====
There are also five decentralized water companies at the state level:

- Aguas de Monagas,
- HIDROLARA in Lara,
- Aguas de Mérida,
- Aguas de Portuguesa, and
- Aguas de Yaracuy.

The population of these five states is almost 20% of the country's total population.

==== Municipalities ====
In some municipalities services are provided through municipal utilities, such as in Aguas de Anaco in Anzoátegui state, Aguas de Capitanejo and Aguas de Zamora in Barinas state, Aguas de Ejido in Mérida state, and Sucre in Miranda state.

==== Community-based organizations ====
Rural water systems are managed by community-based organization, including some cooperatives. In 2003 there were also 20 urban cooperatives that provided water services at the neighborhood level. The Chávez government encourages such "community experiences", which also include so-called "technical water tables" (Mesas Técnicas de Agua). These are associations involved in monitoring neighborhood-level segments of water supply and sanitation networks, including the identification and reduction of leakage and illegal connections. In 2003 there were about 1,500 such technical water tables in Venezuela.

== Economic efficiency ==
Non-revenue water stood at 62% in 2000, far above the regional average of 40% and higher than its historical level of 55% in 1996 and 59% in 1997. HIDROVEN suggests illegal connections are a major contributor to poor non-revenue water performance in the country. An inadequate record maintenance and rehabilitation likely also contributes to high losses.

== Financial aspects ==
=== Tariffs and cost recovery ===
Cost recovery. Revenues usually are not sufficient to meet operating costs – the ratio of revenue to operating costs was estimated at 86% in 2002. This was a substantial increase compared to 27% in 1994, 65% in 1997 and 75% in 2000, despite high levels of inflation. As of 2010, 36% of all users, mainly in groups with low ability to pay, received water free of charge. In 2010 Hidrocapital, which serves Caracas, charged on average the equivalent of US$0.41 per cubic meter, while its costs were US$0.44 per cubic meter. For 2008, Hidroven had a sales revenue of MB$786, thus covering 77% of its operation and maintenance costs of MB$1,024.

Tariff level and adjustments. Tariff levels vary substantially within Venezuela by a factor of almost 1:10 between regional companies, reflecting differences in the cost of service provision. The highest tariffs are found in Caracas and the lowest in Aguas de Yaracuy and the Llanos. Tariffs were frozen in February 2003 at the national level, leading to a 60% tariff decline in real value because of inflation until 2010.

Metering, billing and collection. In 2008 the share of metered water consumption in total water consumption was 36%, up from only 20% in 1998. However, only about half the meters were read in 2008 with a meter reading rate of only 17.5%. Billing and collection performance is inadequate as total sector collection in 2003 amounted for merely 73% of the total billing. In 1998 this coefficient stood at only 62%. In individual companies the ratio varied greatly between 26% in Yaracuy and 80% in Mérida.

=== Investment ===
Historical investment levels There are no recent data on the level of investments in the sector. In the five years between 1997 and 2001 Venezuela invested US$637 million in water and sanitation, or about US$127 million annually on average. Investment in the sector has historically been volatile. For example, annual investments fluctuated in the 1986–1998 period between less than US$100 million (in 1989) and US$400 million (in 1992). To a large extent investment levels mirror fluctuation in oil prices. Investment levels declined from 1986 to 1989 when oil prices were very low. Investments skyrocketed in 1992 after oil prices had increased. Then they plummeted again when oil prices decreased during the remainder of the 1990s. The volatility in sector financing has made it difficult to initiate a sustainable medium-term investment program needed to rehabilitate infrastructure and extend access to services.

Planned investment levels In 2002 the Government adopted an ambitious six-year investment plan for the sector. Under that Plan by the end of 2007 access to potable water and sanitation should both reach 99%, non-revenue water should be reduced to 45%, collection efficiency should increase to 95% and the share of treated wastewater should reach 30%. The plan estimates that a total of US$4.77 billion will be required between 2003 and 2015 for the sector, which implies an average annual investment of approximately US$500 million, or about four times historic investment levels.

=== Financing ===
Sources of financing Before the decentralization of the 1990s investments were almost exclusively financed by central government transfers through a number of different programs, including funds borrowed from international financial institutions and passed on as grants to the service providers. In 2000–2001 state governments and municipalities financed almost half of total investments of US$120m and US$190m respectively. The capital market makes no contribution to sector financing.

Procedures for Investment Financing The 2001 sector law calls for the creation of a Financial Assistance Fund (Fondo de Asistencia Financiera – FAF) to be administered by a new entity called ONDESAPS which would coordinate and target investments in the sector (see section on the new sector law above). Until 2007 neither FAF nor ONDESAPS have been created. Neither investment subsidies nor recurrent subsidies, whether paid by the national government or state governments, are linked to performance improvements.

== External support ==
The Inter-American Development Bank and the Andean Development Corporation are the main institutions that provide external support for water supply and sanitation in Venezuela. It was reported in 2004 that the lack in the availability of counterpart funds, which the government has to provide as part of their obligations to execute projects financed by external agencies, had paralyzed various large externally financed projects.

Inter-American Development Bank In 2010 the IDB provided a $50 million loan to promote the efficient use of drinking water by replacing pipes and installing meters for 80,000 households in at least five of the subsidiaries of Hidroven, including in the Ocumarito neighborhood in Caracas. Previously the IDB had attempted to support the reform of the water and sanitation sector through a decentralization loan of US$100 million that was approved in 1998 and had to be cancelled subsequently. The loan had aimed at introducing private sector participation, following the model of management contracts in the state of Monagas and Lara.

Development Bank of Latin America and the Caribbean The Development Bank of Latin America and the Caribbean (CAF) supported the water and sanitation sector through various loans, including five loans approved until 2003 for a total of US$292m, of which three for HIDROCAPITAL, the subsidiary of HIDROVEN serving Caracas. In 2004 CAF approved a US$15m loan to improve water and sanitation services in the Peninsula of La Guajira in Zulia state. In 2005 the CAF reassigned US$25m from a non-disbursing water and sanitation sector modernization and rehabilitation loan to environmental projects. At the beginning of 2008, the CAF announced that it has approved a water and sanitation loan for the Venezuelan states of Amazonas, Anzoátegui, Aragua, Bolívar, Cojedes, Delta Amacuro, Sucre and Trujillo. The program is estimated to have a total cost of US$72.3m, of which CAF will finance US$50m, the remainder being financed by local counterpart funds. The program will be executed by Hidroven.

Canadian Development Agency The Canadian Development Agency CIDA finances a sanitation project for Caracas.

== Key sources ==
- Corporación Andina de Fomento (CAF): Venezuela. Análisis del Sector Agua Potable y Saneamiento, Marzo de 2004, written by María Elena Corrales CAF Agua y Saneamiento Venezuela Accessed on 10 October 2007 Análisis del Sector Agua Potable y Saneamiento, Marzo de 2004 (PDF), archived from the original (PDF) on 20 March 2009
