= IMTA =

Imta was a ruler of Sumer.

IMTA may refer to:

== Groups, Organizations, Companies ==
- International Modeling and Talent Association
- International Map Trade Association
- International Management Teachers Academy, of the Central and East European Management Development Association
- International Military Testing Association, for military science
- Institute of Municipal Treasurers and Accountants, former name of the Chartered Institute of Public Finance and Accountancy
- Instituto Mexicano de Tecnología del Agua (Spanish: Mexican Institute of Water Technology), see Water supply and sanitation in Mexico and Irrigation in Mexico
- Institute for Medical Technology Assessment (iMTA) of Erasmus University Rotterdam

== Other uses ==
- Integrated multi-trophic aquaculture
- Intel Modular Test Architecture, a program using Fox toolkit
- It's That Man Again, a British radio comedy
- imta, a term in Moroccan Arabic
