= Water resources management in Mexico =

- Withdrawals by sector 2008: Domestic: 14%; Agriculture: 76.8%; Industry: 9.3%
- Surface water produced internally: 361 km^{3} (87 mi^{3})
- Groundwater recharge: 139 km^{3} (33 mi^{3})
- Overlap shared by surface water and groundwater: 91 km^{3} (22 mi^{3})
- External renewable water resources: 48.22 10^9 m3 per capita
- Renewable water resources per capita: 3,606 m^{3} (127,300 ft^{3})
- Wetland designated as Ramsar sites: 53,178.57 km^{2} (13,140,710 acres)
- Hydropower generation: 22%

Water resources management is a significant challenge for Mexico. The country has in place a system of water resources management that includes both central (federal) and decentralized (basin and local) institutions. Furthermore, water management is imposing a heavy cost to the economy.

The arid northwest and central regions contain 77% of Mexico's population and generate 87% of the gross domestic product (GDP). By contrast, the poorer southern regions have abundant water resources. Surface and groundwater resources are overall overexploited and polluted thus leading to an insufficient water availability to support economic development and environmental sustainability. These challenges are expected to become more complicated as climate change creates more extreme weather and further heat and dry weather in already arid regions.

== Water management history and recent developments ==
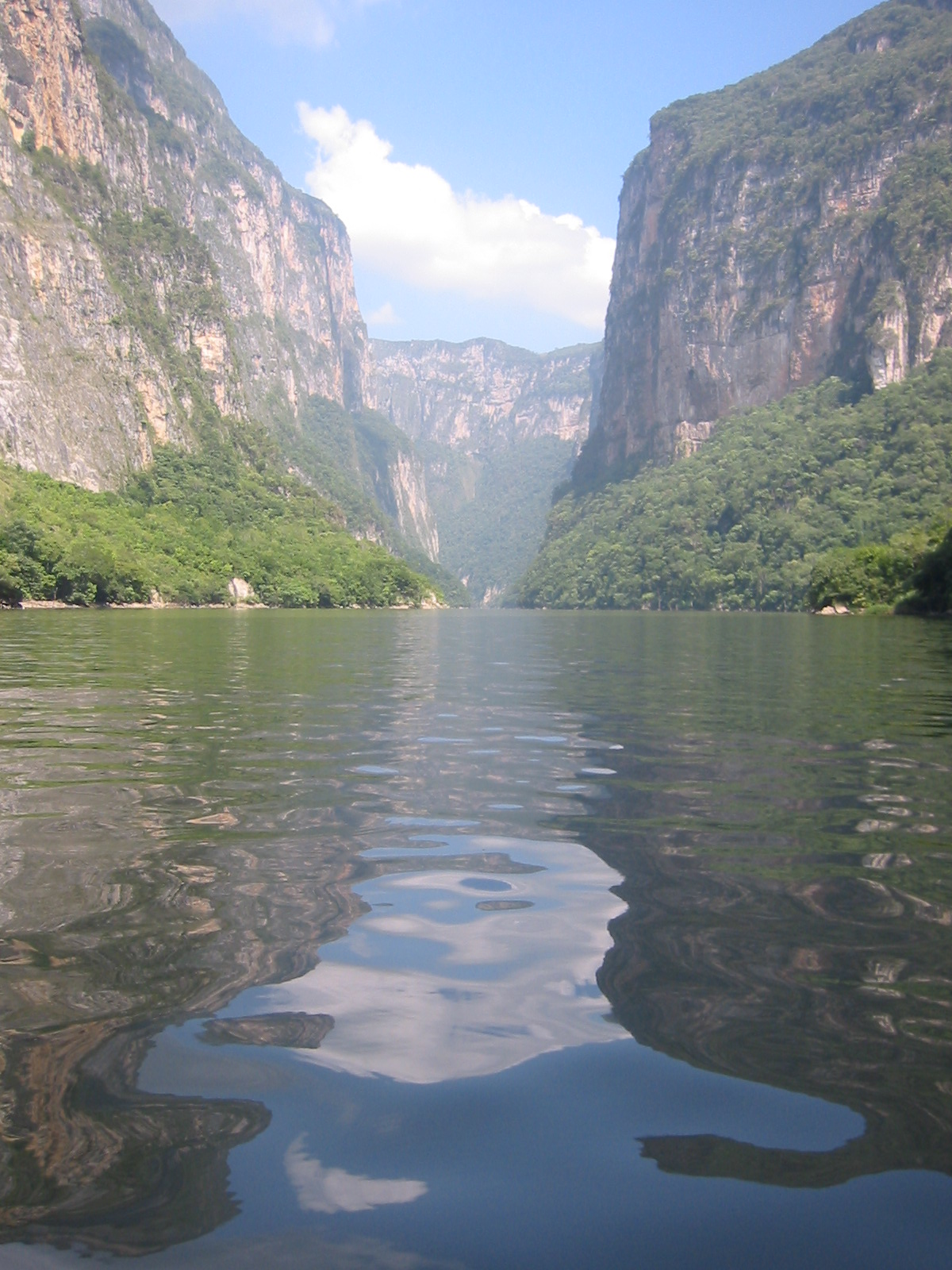
Cañón del Sumidero, river Grijalva, in Chiapas.

Mexico has a long and well-established tradition on water resources management (WRM) which started approximately in the 1930s when the country began investing heavily in water storage facilities and groundwater development to expand irrigation and supply water to the rapidly increasing population.

The 1934 Código Agrario, promulgated during the Cárdenas administration (1934–1940), granted the federal government powers to define the "public interest" to which water could be harnessed. By virtue of such legislation, between the 1930s and 1970s, the rural community and ejido sector were subject to direct federal control over water. Private landowners, on the other hand, enjoyed the benefits of federally subsidized irrigation infrastructure and guaranteed market prices. Over time, large landowners became highly capitalized, while small land owners, by the 1970s, were suffering from the effects of water monopolies.

In the 1970s, the Mexican government entered into a tripartite agreement with the World Bank and the United Nations Development Programme to prepare the 1975 National Water Plan (NWP), which identified the need to enact a New Water Law (NWL) and a National Water Authority (ANA) as well as decentralize responsibilities and promote water user participation in operational and maintenance (O&M). The NWP spurred a significant institutional development and infrastructural achievements: (i) the federal government transfer responsibilities for water supply and sanitation to municipalities and states in 1983, (ii) the Mexican Institute of Water Technology was established in 1986, (iii) the National Commission on Water (CONAGUA) was established in 1988, and (iv) in 1989, the first Basin Council was created in Lerma Chapala, incorporating water users from multiple sectors.

During the 1990s, there was expedited groundwater development and aquifer pumping for combined agricultural, urban, and industrial demand. In addition, the federal government decentralized responsibility for maintaining large irrigation infrastructure to autonomous agencies (irrigation districts).

In 1992, Mexico adopted the Ley de Aguas Nacionales (LAN), which contained specific provisions for the role of the CONAGUA, the structure and functioning of river basin councils, public participation in water management, etc. In 1993 the Cutzamala system, one of the largest pumping schemes in the world, was completed. The Cutzamala system pumps 19 cubic meters per second (670 cu ft/s) of water into the Mexico City metropolitan area.

In 1997 the first technical groundwater committee was created to manage an overexploited aquifer in the state of Guanajuato.

With the 2004 revision of the National Water Law, the thirteen decentralized CNA regions would become basin organizations serving as the technical arm of more broad-based basin councils that incorporate civil society interests including the private sector and citizens' groups.

== Water resource base ==
=== Surface and ground water resources ===
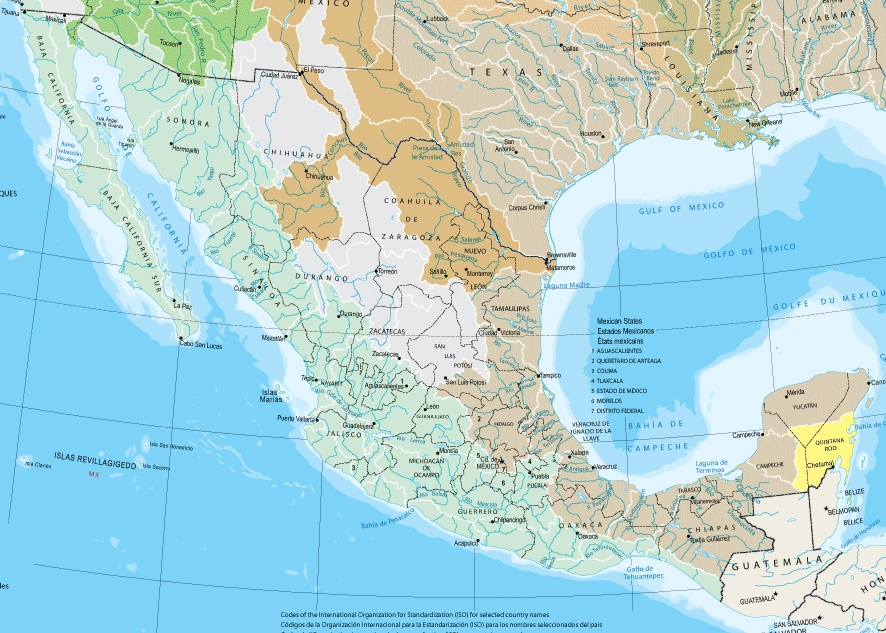
Watersheds of Mexico. Basins in green drain to the Pacific, in brown to the Gulf of Mexico, and in yellow to the Caribbean Sea. Grey indicates interior basins that do not drain to the sea.

Mexico's internal renewable water resources per capita is 4,016 cubic metres (141,800 ft^{3}), which is below the average in the Central American and the Caribbean region, 6,645 cubic metres (234,700 ft^{3}).

Total internal renewable water resources are 457 billion cubic meters (BCM)/year, plus 49 BCM/year inflows from neighboring countries (average 1977–2001). A total of 65% of this surface runoff occurs in seven rivers: Grijalva, Usumacinta, Papaloapan, Coatzacoalcos, Balsas, Panuco, Santiago and Tonala, whose total watershed area represents 22% of the country's total land area. The Balsas and Santiago rivers empty on the Pacific Ocean, while the other five empty into the Gulf of Mexico. The largest river on the Pacific coast is the Balsas River (24 BCM/year) and the largest river on the Atlantic Coast is the Grijalva–Usumacinta flowing from Guatemala to Mexico (115 BCM.year). The longest river (2018 km) and also the river with the largest basin (226,000 km^{2}) is the Rio Bravo, called Rio Grande in the United States.

The historical mean annual precipitation (1941–2004) is 773 mm (30.4 in), with 77% of all precipitation accruing between June and October. Rainfall is highly variable and droughts are frequent. The states most affected by drought, as measured by the agricultural area affected by drought, are Chihuahua, Mexico and Zacatecas. A little over 70% of rainwater in Mexico is lost through evapotranspiration and returns to the atmosphere. The rest runs off rivers and streams or infiltrates into the subsoil and recharges groundwater.

Mexico shares three watersheds (Colorado, Bravo and Tijuana) with the United States, four with Guatemala (Grijalva, Usumacinta, Suchiate, Coatan, and Candelaria) and one with Belize and Guatemala (Rio Hondo). The waters are shared with the U.S. in accordance with the stipulations included in the Treaty relating to the utilization of waters of the Colorado and Tijuana Rivers and of the Rio Grande, signed in 1944.

Groundwater accounts for 64% of the volume for public water supply, 33% of all water used for agriculture and livestock, and 24% of water utilized by self-supplied industry. There are 653 groundwater aquifers in Mexico. CONAGUA estimates the total amount of groundwater recharge to be around 77 cubic kilometres (18 mi^{3}) per year, 36.4% of which, (around 28 km^{3} or 6.7 mi^{3} per year) are actually used. This average rate does not fully represent the situation of the arid region, where a negative balance is threatening the sustainable use of groundwater resources.

Groundwater is a key water supplier for several users in the arid region or in some cities where groundwater is most of the time the sole water resource available. About 71% of the groundwater is used for agriculture, 20% for water urban supply and 3% for domestic and animal use.

Water is abundant in the relatively sparsely populated South and scarce in the more densely populated Center and North of the country. The Center and the North of the country where 77% of Mexico's population lives and 85% of its GDP is generated dispose of only 32% of the country's renewable water resources.

=== Storage capacity and infrastructure ===
There are 667 large dams with a storage capacity of 150 BCM and an actual storage of 70 BCM in 2005. Mexico has 4,000 dams and other hydraulic infrastructure with a storage capacity of 180 cubic kilometres (43 mi^{3}), which account for 44% of the annual flow. In the arid regions, dams are mostly used for irrigation. In the humid areas, dams are mostly used for electricity generation. Dams are also considered a means for flood protection in Mexico. Approximately 63 dams have a storage capacity of over 100,000,000 cubic metres (81,000 acre⋅ft), and account for 95% of Mexico's storage capacity. The largest reservoirs are La Angostura (20,217 km^{2}), Nezahualcóyotl (14,0298 km^{2}), Chicoasén (11,883 km^{2}), and Infiernillo (11,860 km^{2}).

There are seven major lakes in Mexico. By far the largest and most important is Chapala Lake between the states of Jalisco and Michoacán with an area of 1,116 km^{2} and a storage capacity of 8,126 cubic hectometres (1.950 mi^{3}). Actual storage volume varies between 1 and 10 BCM since measurements began in 1935. The lake is only 4 to 6 m deep. Mexico has approximately 70 lakes with a storage capacity of 14 km^{3} (3.4 mi^{3}).

Main lakes and storage capacity
Lake	River basin area		Storage capacity		Federal Entity
Lake	km^{2}	sq mi	hm^{3}	acre feet	Federal Entity
Chapala	1,116	431	8,126	6,588,000	Jalisco and Michoacan
Cuitzeo	306	118	920	750,000	Michoacan
Patzcuaro	97	37	550	450,000	Michoacan
Yuriria	80	31	188	152,000	Guanajuato
Catemaco	75	29	454	368,000	Veracruz
Tequesquitengo	8	3.1	16	13,000	Morelos
Nabor Carrillo	10	3.9	12	9,700	Mexico

Source: CONAGUA

=== Water quality ===
According to the Water Quality Index, 96% of Mexico's surface water bodies have different levels of pollution. OECD estimates the economic cost of water pollution in Mexico at US$6 billion per year. The problem is most serious in the Valle de Mexico region where 100% of the water bodies have different levels of contamination, 18% of which are highly polluted. Low water quality is due to untreated discharge of industrial effluents and municipal wastewater into rivers and lakes, solid waste deposits along river banks, uncontrolled seepage from unsanitary landfills, and non-point pollution mainly from agricultural production.

CONAGUA has also detected infiltration of untreated municipal wastewater in 8 aquifers, iron and manganese in 2, arsenic in 1 aquifer of the Lagunera region. In overexploited aquifers, contamination tends to worsen over time as the groundwater reservoir is depleted. This is the case of the Lagunera region, where concentration of 0.09 to 0.59 mg/L of arsenic found in the drinking water, are above of the permissible level of 0.05 mg/L. In addition, information regarding water quality, available by the Public Water Rights and Registry, is scarce and often unreliable.

Information on the water quality of Mexico's rivers published by the National Water Commission is limited to only two parameters, Biological Oxygen Demand (BOD) and Chemical Oxygen Demand (COD). No other water quality indicators are used to classify water bodies and no water quality data using other pollutants as parameters are readily available.

Surface water bodies in Mexico are classified in five different ambient water quality classes, using BOD and COD as indicators. In 2005 surface water quality was measured in 509 sites using these parameters.

Using BOD as an indicator, in 2005 5% of water bodies were classified as highly contaminated (BOC > 120 mg/L) and 10% as contaminated.(BOD > 30 mg/L). If COD is used as an indicator, the respective shares increase to 12% for highly contaminated (COD > 200) and 26% for contaminated (COD > 40) waterbodies.

The highest levels of contamination are found in the hydrological regions of the Northeast, Balsas, Valley of Mexico and Lerma-Chapala.

== Water resources management by sector ==
Total water withdrawals for consumptive use are 78 BCM/year. The largest consumptive water user is agriculture (78%), followed by domestic use (17%) and industry (5%). There are no estimates on the Minimum Environmental Flow Requirements in Mexico. Environmental demand thus is de facto absent from the official water balances in Mexico.

Overall, only 18% of water resources in Mexico are withdrawn for consumptive use. However, there is water stress in several regions of the country. The highest pressure on water resources is encountered around Mexico City (120% of resources), in Baja California (86% of resources) and in Sonora in the Northwest (79% of resources).

CNA has defined 653 "aquifers" out of which 104 were categorized as overexploited in 2005. Total groundwater use was 27.5 BCM/year, while recharge is estimated at 77BCM/year. Out of the country's 13 administrative hydrological regions, in 4 regions abstraction exceeds recharge: Baja California, Northeast, North-Center and the Valley of Mexico.

Water withdrawal per sector in 2005
Withdrawal	Freshwater		Groundwater		Total		%
Withdrawal	hm^{3}	acre feet	hm^{3}	acre feet	hm^{3}	acre feet	%
Agriculture (a)	39,545.0	32,059,700	19,176.0	15,546,200	58,721.3	47,606,100	76.8
Domestic	3,879.0	3,144,800	6,824.5	5,532,700	10,703.5	8,677,500	14.0
Industrial (b)	5,347.2	4,335,000	1,736.4	1,407,700	7,083.6	5,742,800	9.3
Total	48,771.5	39,539,700	27,736.9	22,486,700	76,508.4	62,026,400	100
Source: CONAGUA (a) Including livestock and aquaculture (b) Including hydropower

=== Drinking water and sanitation ===
In 1998, domestic consumption accounted for 17% of surface water withdrawals in Mexico. During the past decade, the Mexican water supply and sanitation sector made major strides in service coverage. In urban areas almost 100% of the population is estimated to have access to improved water supply and 91% to adequate sanitation. In rural areas, the respective shares are 87% for water and 41% for sanitation. Coverage levels are particularly low in the southern regions. (See also Water supply and sanitation in Mexico)

=== Irrigation and drainage ===
In 1998, agriculture accounted for 78% of surface water withdrawals in Mexico. A total of 62,000 km^{2} (15.3 million acre) count with irrigation infrastructure (22.9% of the total cultivated area), 55,000 km^{2} (13.6 million acres) of which are actually irrigated. In 1997, 58,000 km^{2} (14.3 million acres) use surface irrigation, 3,000 km^{2} use sprinkler irrigation and 1,000 km^{2} localized irrigation. Ineffective irrigation has generated salinization and drainage problems in 3,841.63 square kilometers (949,290 acres) of a total irrigated area of 62,560 square kilometers (15,460,000 acres). (See also Irrigation in Mexico)

=== Hydropower ===
The electricity sector in Mexico relies heavily on thermal sources (74% of total installed capacity), followed by hydropower generation (22%) in 2005. The largest hydro plant in Mexico is the 2,300 MW Manuel Moreno Torres in Chicoasén, Chiapas. This is the world's fourth most productive hydroelectric plant.

=== Aquatic ecosystems ===
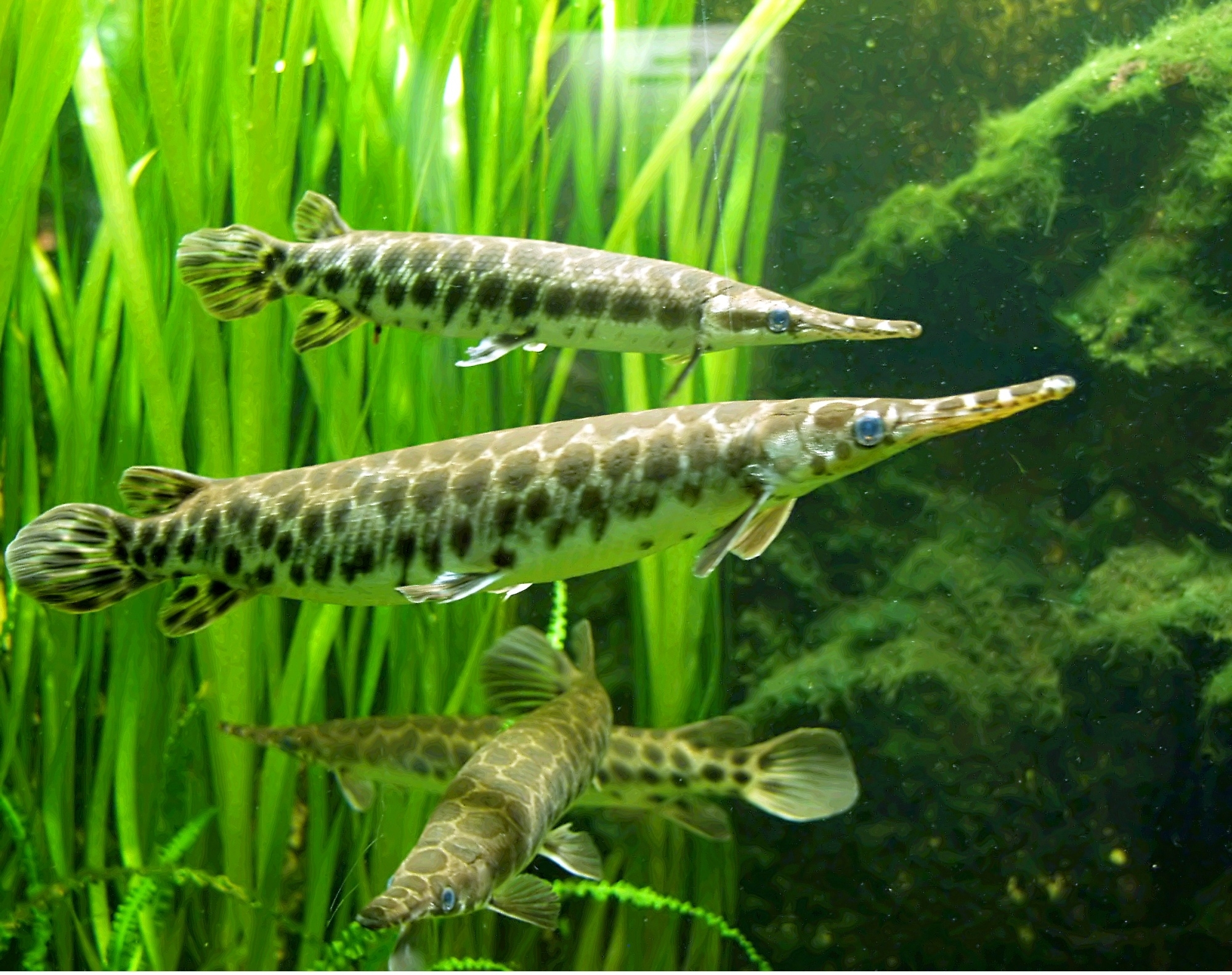
A Lepisosteus, one of the endemic species of Mexico

There are approximately 70 lakes in Mexico, covering a total area of 3,700 square kilometers (910,000 acres). Some of these lakes, especially in the eastern side, have a volcanic origin and count with numerous endemic species. Lake Chapala, the largest Mexican lake, is considered a hydrological priority region for biodiversity conservation due to its 39 local species, 19 of which are endemic. Lake Catemaco, located in Veracruz, has 12 native species 9 of which are endemic.

Wetlands in Mexico are dynamic, complex and productive ecosystems. Six major wetland are registered in the Ramsar Convention on Wetlands: Lagartos River (Yucatan Peninsula), Cuatrocienagas (Coahuila), La Encrucijada (Chiapas), Marsh Nayarit and Sinaloa, Centla Swamp (Tabasco), and the Colorado River (Baja California).

Cenotes, sinkholes on the Yucatan peninsula that are filled with groundwater, host a number of unique species from bacteria, algae and protozoa (i.e. copepoda, cladocera and rotifera) to vertebrates (i.e.lepisosteus). Cenotes are the main water source for many ancient and contemporary Maya people, as there are no rivers and very few lakes on the peninsula.

== Legal and institutional framework ==
=== Legal framework ===
The main law governing water resources management in Mexico is the National Water Law of 1992 (Ley de Aguas Nacionales -LAN), revised on April 29, 2004.

According to the LAN key functions in the sector are the responsibility of the federal government, through the National Water Commission (CNA or CONAGUA). CNA's mission is to "manage and preserve national water resources, with the participation of the society, to reach a sustainable use of the resource." CNA has a staff of 16,000 and an annual budget of 18.6 billion pesos in 2005 (more than US$1.5bn) and is considered to be one of the most powerful federal agencies in Mexico. CNA administrates major federal programs to support investments in water supply and sanitation as well as in irrigation. It also directly manages certain key hydraulic facilities such as the Cutzamala Pipeline that supplies a large share of the water used in the Metropolitan Area of Mexico City. CNA also owns and operates most dams in Mexico and operates the country's water monitoring network. The LAN made possible to implement a regulatory framework that seeks to encourage greater efficiency and a more accurate perception of the social, economic, and environmental value of water resources. Therefore, waters users operate within a framework of rights and obligations that are clearly defined in three basic instruments:

- Titles of concession or allocation, which establish the right to withdraw, use or enjoy in usufruct a specific volume of water
- Permits for wastewater discharges. This instrument establishes the concession under which permittees must dispose of resulting wastewater
- Enrollment in the Public Registry of the Water Rights (Registro Público de Derechos de Agua – REDPA) of both titles of concession or allocation and permits for discharging wastewater, which affords the rights granted to water users greater certainty and assistance from a legal standpoint.

The 2004 amended National Water Law (NWL) aims to restructure CONAGUA key functions through the transfer of responsibilities from the central level to subnational entities: the basin agencies (Organismos de Cuenca – BA) and Basin Councils (Consejos de Cuenca – BC). BA and BCs are expected to play an increasing role in the sector limiting CONAGUA's role to the administration of the NWL, the conduct of national water policy, and planning, supervision, support and regulatory activities.

The NWL also introduced a Water Financing System (Sistema Finaciero del Agua – SFA). CONAGUA will create together with the Ministry of Finance appropriate instruments to determine funding sources, spending guidelines, cost recovery, settling of accounts and management indicators.

Through the 2004 revision of the National Water Law two new entities were formally created: Basin Councils (Consejos de Cuenca) and Basin Agencies (Organismos de Cuenca). The basin councils consist of representatives of the federal government, state and municipal governments, as well as at least 50% representatives of water users and NGOs. The basin councils are not decision-making bodies, but are consultative bodies. There are 26 basin councils. The basin agencies, on the other hand, are the regional administrative branches of the CNA, which retains the ultimate decision-making power.

Obviously other entities such as the Ministry of Finance, the Federal Congress, State Governments and State Congresses, as well as the Ministry of Environment and Natural Resources are important decision-makers in the sector.

=== Institutional framework ===
Three groups of institutions have been assigned with the main responsibilities for WRM: (i) the National Water Commission (Comisión Nacional del Agua –CONAGUA), at the federal level; (ii) Water Commissions (Comisiones Estatales del Agua – CEAs), at the State level; and (iii) basin authorities and basin councils.

CONAGUA is the highest institution for water resource management in Mexico, including water policy, water rights, planning, irrigation and drainage development, water demand management, water supply and sanitation, and emergency and disaster management (with an emphasis on flooding). CONAGUA's mission is to manage and preserve national water resources, with the participation of the society, to reach a sustainable use of the resource.

CONAGUA is formally under the authority of the Ministry of Environment and Natural Resources (Secretaria del Medio Ambiente y Recursos Naturales – SEMARNAT) but it enjoys considerable de facto autonomy. It employs 17,000 professionals, has 13 regional offices and 32 state offices and had an annual budget of US$1.2 billion in 2005. It also directly manages certain key hydraulic facilities such as the Cutzamala Pipeline that supplies a large share of the water used in the Metropolitan Area of Mexico City. CONAGUA also owns and operates most dams in Mexico and operates the country's water monitoring network.

The CEAs are autonomous entities that usually are under the authority of the State Ministry of Public Works. Their attributions are different among states and can include water resources management, irrigation and the provision of water supply and sanitation services.

The recently created Basin Authorities (BAs) will develop from the 13 existing Regional Offices of CONAGUA and are expected to be responsible for formulating regional policy, designing programs to implement such policies, conducting studies to estimate the value of the financial resources generated within their boundaries (water user fees and service fees), recommending specific rates for water user fees and collecting them. Basin Councils (BCs) are expected to guide, together with CONAGUA, BAs work. There are a total of 25 BCs that have been established with the same basin boundaries as the BAs. Some states are located entirely within the area of one BC. In other cases, one state is divided between two or more BCs. In the latter case, the state participates in all of the BCs within its territory.

=== Government strategy ===
The 2004 amended National Water Law (NWL) aims to restructure CONAGUA key functions through the transfer of responsibilities from the central level to subnational entities: the basin agencies (Organismos de Cuenca – BA) and Basin Councils (Consejos de Cuenca – BC). BA and BCs are expected to play an increasing role in the sector limiting CONAGUA's role to the administration of the NWL, the conduct of national water policy, and planning, supervision, support and regulatory activities.

The NWL also introduced a Water Financing System (Sistema Finaciero del Agua – SFA). CONAGUA will create together with the Ministry of Finance appropriate instruments to determine funding sources, spending guidelines, cost recovery, settling of accounts and management indicators.

The National Water Plan 2007-2012, linked to the National Development Plan, aims at ensuring water quality and quantity, recognizing the strategic value of water and promoting sustainable water use and water resources conservation. The Plan has eight objectives, namely: (i) increasing agricultural productivity, (ii) increasing access and quality of water supply and sanitation services, (iii) promoting integrated water resources management at the river basin level, (iv) improving technical, administrative and financial development of the water sector, (v) increase participation of water users and society in general in the management of water resources, (vi) reduce water risks, (vii) evaluate climate change impacts on water resources, and (viii) promote compliance with the National Water Law, especially on administrative matters.

Each objective has a strategy and a set of goals associated. The NWP has a total budget of 227,130 million pesos (about US$21.9 billion), which does not include operational and maintenance costs of hydraulic infrastructure.

== Permits ==
The effectiveness of permits is reduced by the fact that the total volume of water for which permits have been granted exceeds total water availability in some regions. A total of 344,473 permits were registered in 2005 in the public register of water rights established in 1992. The total volume of water for which permits were granted is 76 BCM/year, excluding permits for hydropower, which is a non-consumptive use of water.

== Water pricing, cost recovery and subsidies ==
Mexico lacks a coherent national policy framework for setting and linking water and sanitation tariffs, subsidies and cost-recovery goals. The absence of overarching policies produces a wide variation in the degree of cost recovery and subsidies across regions. Tariffs are set below costs – the most common form of user subsidy in water supply and sanitation.

Water resource pricing through abstraction charges is carried out on the basis of the Federal Rights Law, which classifies the country in nine water scarcity zones. In zones with the highest water scarcity, generally in the North, abstraction charges are highest. However agriculture as the major water user is exempt from the abstraction charge and the charge only paid by industry and municipal users. This considerably limits the effectiveness of the charge as a tool for water demand management, although it has been very effective at mobilizing financial resources. Total revenues from abstraction charges were 6.5bn Pesos in 2005, accounting for 80% of CNA revenues.

Water service providers charge industrial and commercial user tariffs that are close to full recovery cost, and cross subsidize residential users. The average tariff across users, US$0.32 per cubic meter ($0.24/cu yd), is half the Latin American and the Caribbean average, US$0.65/m^{3} ($0.50/cu yd).

The level of collection efficiency in Mexico has been estimated at 72%, far below the levels achieved in developed countries (OECD 95%). Water tariff collections in water supply and sanitation have been estimated at US$1.54 billion in 2002. Billed revenues were estimated at between US$2.14 billion and US$2.9 billion.

Approximately 31% of water customers are not metered and are charged a flat rate, independent of consumption, differentiated by neighborhood.

== Water-related risks ==
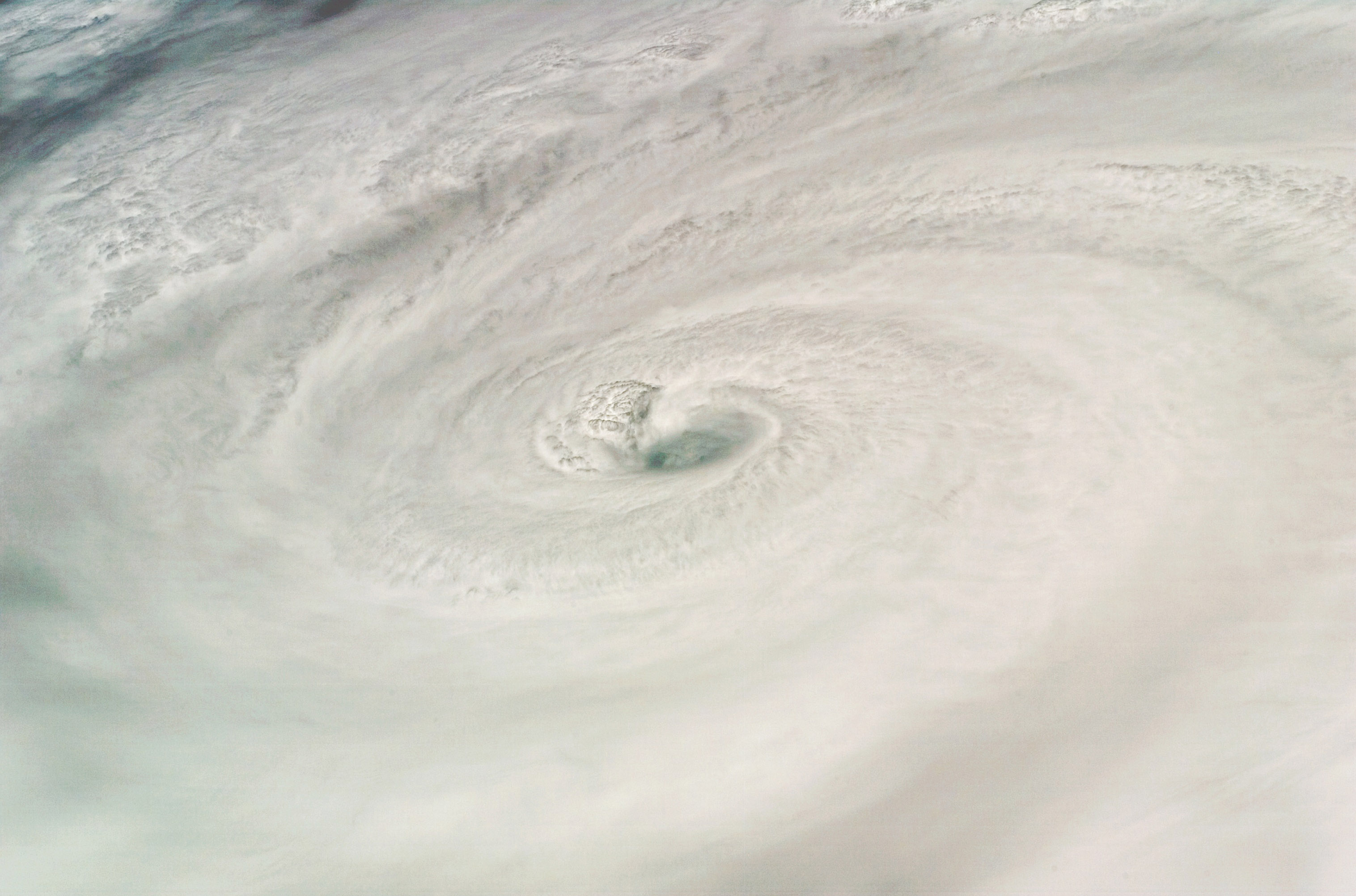
Hurricane Dean photographed by International Space Station astronauts

Mexico is prone to several weather events including hurricanes on both Pacific and Caribbean coasts. Hurricanes contribute to recharge surface and groundwater reservoirs with increases water supply for cities, irrigation and electricity generation. Hurricanes pose also a threat to service delivery, infrastructure and ultimately to ecosystems and human life. This situation is aggravated by deforestation upstream as well as human settlements located in flood prone areas.

In the context of the US National Assessment of the Potential Consequences of Climate Variability and Change (National Assessment on Climate Change) published in 2000, which was part of the US Global Change Research Program (Global Change Research Act), the National Ecology Institute of the National University of Mexico (UNAM) carried out a study on Impacts of Climate Change and Climate Variability in Mexico for the Mexican Ministry of Environment and Natural Resources. According to the study Mexico will experience less or normal summer precipitation and increased precipitation during winter. The report also details predicted impact by regions. For example, in the Lerma-Chapala basin the predicted increase in temperature coupled with a decrease in rainfall could result in severe water supply shortages, exacerbated by growth in population and industries. In northern areas and regions with large populations, especially in Central Mexico erosion and drought severity will increase with higher temperatures and rainfall variations in these arid and semi arid regions. Agricultural practices may also have to change, with a severe drought in Chihuahua in 2012, which some scientists attribute to climate change, leading to 350,000 head of cattle starving to death due to a shortage of pasture caused by a lack of rain.

Researchers have also predicted that tensions between Mexico and the US over shared water resources could increase as climate change increases water scarcity in both countries.

With more than 85% of the Mexican land area defined as arid or semi-arid and a highly variable interannual rainfall Mexico is also prone to droughts, especially in the northern areas. The most severe droughts in Mexico in recent decades coincide with the variations in Pacific sea-surface temperatures associated with El Niño. The economic and social and environmental impacts of droughts in Mexico are notable. In 1996, four years of below normal rainfall produced farms losses estimated at US$1 billion and interstate political between Sonora and Sinaloa.

== Potential climate change impacts ==
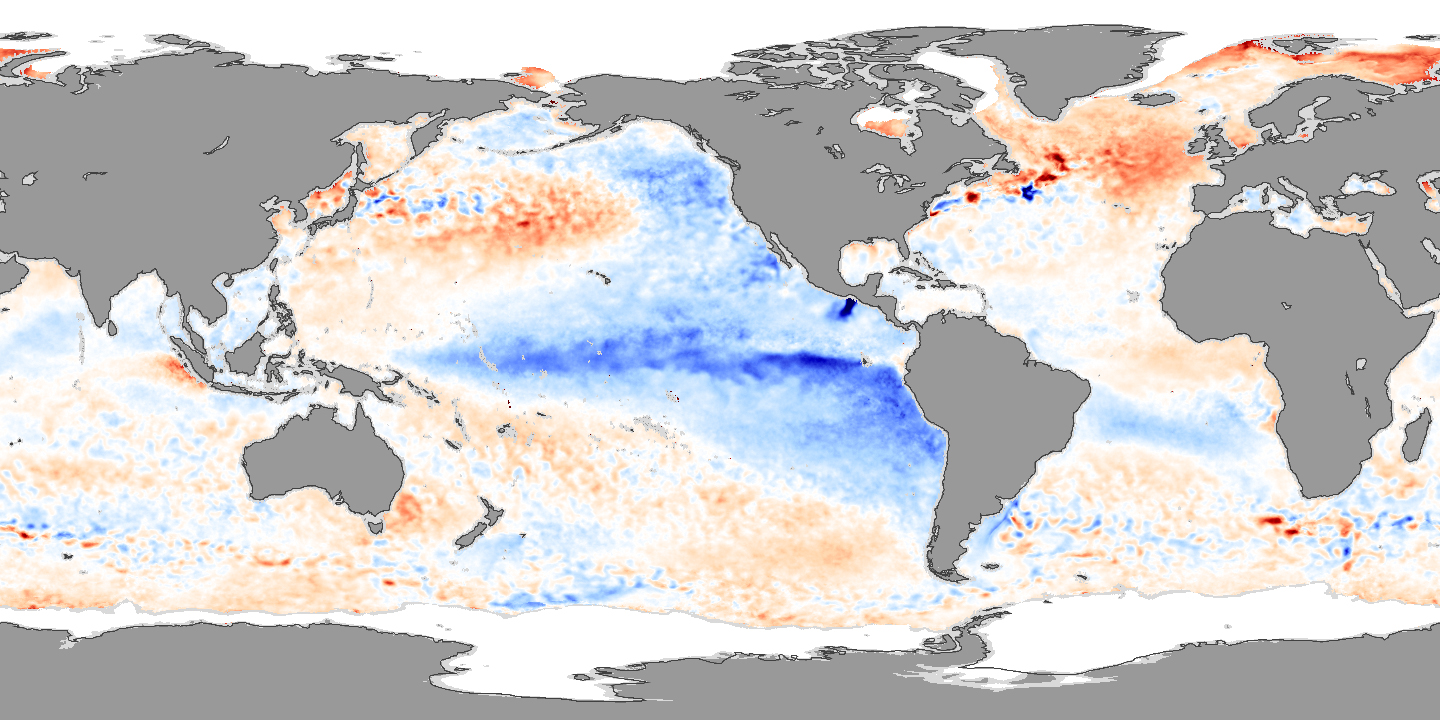
Sea surface skin temperature anomalies in November 2007 showing La Niña conditions

In parts of Mexico climate change is projected to produce a decrease in water flow. Furthermore, an increase on water demand is expected due to increasing temperature and extreme weather conditions such as droughts and floods due to El Niño Southern Oscillation and La Niña are expected to become more frequent.

The IPCC considers various scenarios with increases in temperatures ranging between 1 and 6 degrees Celsius. By 2050, the Mexican Institute of Water Technology expects a 7-12% decrease in precipitation in the southern basins, 3% in the Mexican Gulf basin, and 11% in the central basin. Precipitation is estimated to continue to decrease over the next 50 years. An increase in category 5 hurricanes is also expected.

During some El Niño/La Niña years, winter precipitation may be so great that stream flow and water levels in dams may exceed those observed during summer. In contrast, summer droughts during these events can lead to serious deficits in reservoir levels and in rain-fed maize production. In Mexico during 1997, the estimated costs of climate anomalies associated with El Niño were 900 million US dollars, particularly in agricultural activities, when 20,000 km^{2} (5 million acres) were affected by a severe drought.

In 2007, SEMARNAT together with the Instituto Mexicano de Tecnología del Agua published a study "Climate Change Effects on Water Resources in Mexico." The main findings are summarized below.

Qualitative vulnerability to climate change by hydrologic-administrative region

Hydrological Region	Change in demand	Change in availability	Scarcity	Hurricane, storms	Droughts	Change in sea level	Observations
Baja California	Major	Decrease	Very vulnerable	Not very vulnerable	Vulnerable	Not very vulnerable	The basin depends on water flowing from the US, which is expected to reduce
Northeast	Major, agriculture biggest water use	Decrease	Very vulnerable	Not very vulnerable	Vulnerable	Sea intrusion on coastal aquifers	One of the most vulnerable regions in Mexico
North Pacific	Major, agriculture biggest water use	Unknown	Vulnerable	Vulnerable	Unknown	Sea intrusion on coastal aquifers	Need further studies
Balsas	Major	Probable decrease	Vulnerable	Very vulnerable in the coastal region Guerrero and Michoacan	Vulnerable	Sea intrusion on Rio Balsas	Severe effects on agriculture in Tlaxcala and highlands
South Pacific	Major	Unknown. Some models expect increased precipitation	Specially on high mountain	Very vulnerable, coastal region	Not very vulnerable	Not very vulnerable	One of the most vulnerable to storms
Rio Bravo	High due to increased population and temperature	Expected decrease on flows and aquifer recharge	Very vulnerable	Not very vulnerable	Very vulnerable	N/A	One of the most important basins and most vulnerable to scarcity and droughts
Central north basins	High, due to increased temperature	Expected decrease on flows and aquifer recharge	Very vulnerable	N/A	Very vulnerable	N/A	One of the most vulnerable basins to scarcity and droughts
Lerma-Santiago-Pacifico	Medium	Unknown, models predict few changes	Very vulnerable due to high use	Not very vulnerable	Vulnerable, high natural variability	Not very vulnerable	Need further research due to high vulnerability and uncertain models
North Gulf	High, due to increased temperature	High probability of increasing, according to most of the models	Not very vulnerable	Vulnerable	Not very vulnerable	High vulnerability on several rivers’ mouths	Probable need to revise design of hydraulic infrastructure, dams, and flooding control.
Center Gulf	High, due to increased temperature	High probability of increasing, according to most of the models	Not very vulnerable	Vulnerable	Not very vulnerable	High vulnerability on several rivers’ mouths	Probable need to revise design of hydraulic infrastructure, dams, flooding control, and landslide
South frontier	High, due to increased temperature	Few changes due to high availability	Not very vulnerable	Very vulnerable, especially on coastal Chiapas	Not very vulnerable, but need for new regulation works	High vulnerability especially on Grivalda and Campoton estuaries	Probable need to revise design of hydraulic infrastructure, dams, flooding control, and landslide
Yucatán	High, due to increased temperature	Vulnerable due to lack of regulation	Vulnerable due to lack of regulation	Very vulnerable, especially on coastal area	Vulnerable due to seasonal droughts	Vulnerable, due to sea intrusion on aquifers	Need of detailed research due to unique geology
Valley of Mexico	Low	Low	Very vulnerable	Vulnerable	Not very vulnerable	N/A	Already on water deficit, in need of high coast adaptation measures

Source: SERMANAT (2007)

== International treaties ==
The sharing of the waters of the Colorado River, the Tijuana River and the Rio Bravo/Rio Grande is defined in the Treaty relating to the utilization of waters of the Colorado and Tijuana Rivers and of the Rio Grande between the US and Mexico signed on February 3, 1944.

== External cooperation ==
The World Bank is currently contributing with US$28.5 million, to an Adaptation to Climate Change Project in the Gulf of Mexico. This project aims at formulating and implementing adaptation policy actions and specific measures in representative systems of Gulf of Mexico wetlands in order to protect their environmental functions and their rich biodiversity from climate change related impacts, and improving the knowledge base to ascertain with a higher level of certainty the anticipated impacts from climate change on the country's water resources, with a primary focus on coastal wetlands and associated inland basins. In November 2007, the Inter-American Development Bank approved a US$200,000 project to support a program for flood emergency in Tabasco. In September 2007 it approved a US$200,000 project to support a program to relief damages caused by Hurricane Dean.

== See also ==
- Comarca Lagunera
- Electricity sector in Mexico
- Water supply and sanitation in Mexico
- Irrigation in Mexico
- Water resources in Mexico
- Water management in Greater Mexico City
- Water scarcity in Mexico
- water demand management
