= Water scarcity in Mexico =

The extent of water scarcity in Mexico is so serious that the government released an advertising campaign titled "February 2010: The City May Run Out of Water".

Mexico City's hydrological paradox is that it gets more than enough rain to, in theory, keep the 21 million people who live in and around it adequately supplied with water. Its average annual precipitation is about twice that of Los Angeles, and even exceeds that of famously damp London. But most of the rainfall (or hail) comes during the summer, and often during just a few epic storms. So when it is wet, it is much too wet, and the city has built massive infrastructure over the past five centuries to get the water out quickly. To keep hydrated during the drier months, Mexico City imports water from other regions, but mainly just pumps from the underground, which causes land subsidence, which makes flooding worse.

In 2024, a lack of rain severely depleted the Cutzamala water system reservoirs, which provide 20 percent of the capital city's water. The drought forced the city to use more water from underground aquifers, which is not ideal as it is not sustainable and also causes the city to physically sink. On top of climate change, infrastructure also contributes to water loss. Mexico City's leaky water pipes are estimated to lose almost 40% of the water between the treatment plant and the household tap.

In May 2008, in Mexico, agriculture accounted for 77% of water use, industry 10% and domestic uses 13%. As a consequence of the 1980 economic crisis, the Mexican irrigation infrastructure became a victim of underinvestment and neglect. Of the 82 irrigation districts present, 42 are in a state of slow deterioration, exacerbating an inefficient usage of water. Furthermore, in a water-saving tax, Tarifa 09, the biggest users of water by far - the farmers, were exempted.

Due to a growing population and significant economic activity, residents in Mexico’s semi-arid and arid northern, northwestern, and central regions use an average of 75 US gallons (280 liters) of water per day, compared to their US counterparts who use only 50 US gallons (190 L). These regions also account for 84% of Mexico's GDP, have 77% of the population, but have only 28% of the runoff water supply. Such high demand factors coupled with low water supplies means water scarcity is particularly evident and serious in these regions.

Mexico is also heavily dependent on underground aquifers, as it continues to draw water from these sources to supply almost 70% of its needs. However, the rate of extraction has far exceeded replenishment. As of 2010, 101 of the 653 aquifers in Mexico are severely exploited, all of which are located in the water-scarce regions. Continual draining of water from such aquifers has resulted in the city plunging some 10 meters in the 20th century, indicating that other alternatives are required to sustain the water supply of Mexico.

An alternative is the tapping of water from the Cutzamala dam system. Huge pipes that used to expel wastewater to prevent flooding are now being used to pipe water into the city from the dam system. Water is transported across a total distance of 180 kilometers and almost 1000 meters in altitude to reach water-scarce states. However, this presents no viable long-term solution either, as the dam system itself is drying up. Enduring the worst drought in 70 years, the Cutzamala basin is only at 47% of its capacity and the water level of the basin continues to fall. Providing a fifth of Mexico's water, the poor infrastructural state of the aged system underscores a loss of 40% or 6,000 litres of water every second before reaching Mexico. Repair projects requiring M70 million have since been shelved, contributing to the standstill in efforts to solve Mexico's water scarcity problem.

== See also ==
- Water resources in Mexico
- Water supply and sanitation in Mexico
