= Water supply and sanitation in Mexico =

Water and Sanitation in Mexico

Data
- Access to an improved water source: 96% (2010)
- Access to improved sanitation: 85% (2010)
- Continuity of supply (%): 45% (2003) 71% (2011)
- Average urban water use (liter/capita/day): 173 (2011, after losses)
- Average urban water tariff (US$/m3): 0.32
- Share of customer metering: 58% (IMTA, 2011), 48% (CONAGUA, 2011)
- Share of collected wastewater treated: 36w% (2006)
- Annual investment in water supply and sanitation: US$2 billion (2005) or US$20/capita (Note: Mex$1 = US$0.09176 in 2005)
- Investment financing: 69% financed through the state budget (2006)

Institutions
- Decentralization to municipalities: Widespread, except for some states, since 1983
- National water and sanitation company: No
- Water and sanitation regulator: No
- Responsibility for policy setting: National Water Commission
- Sector law: Yes (1992, amended in 2009), with a focus on water resources
- Number of urban service providers: 2,517 (2011), including 637 in localities with more than 20,000 inhabitants
- Number of rural service providers: n/a

Water supply and sanitation in Mexico is characterized by achievements and challenges. Among the achievements is a significant increase in access to piped water supply in urban areas (88% to 93%) as well as in rural areas (50% to 74%) between 1990 and 2010. Additionally, a strong nationwide increase in access to improved sanitation (64% to 85%) was observed in the same period. Other achievements include the existence of a functioning national system to finance water and sanitation infrastructure with a National Water Commission as its apex institution; and the existence of a few well-performing utilities such as Aguas y Drenaje de Monterrey.

The challenges include water scarcity in the northern and central parts of the country; inadequate water service quality (drinking water quality; 55% of Mexicans receiving water only intermittently according to results of the 2000 census); poor technical and commercial efficiency of most utilities (with an average level of non-revenue water of 51% in 2003); an insufficient share of wastewater receiving treatment (36% in 2006); and still inadequate access in rural areas. In addition to on-going investments to expand access, the government has embarked on a large investment program to improve wastewater treatment.

== Access ==
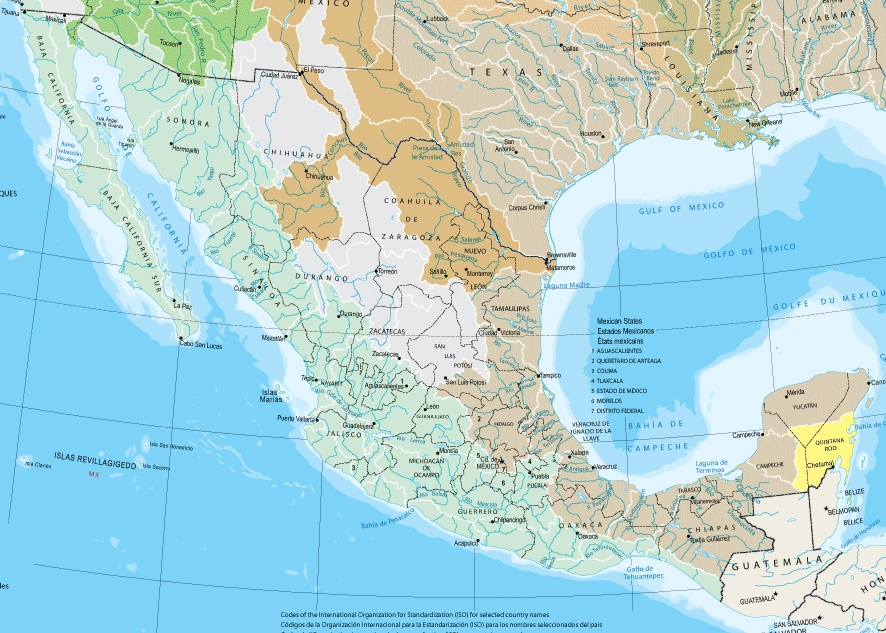
Rivers in Mexico

		Urban (78% of the population)	Rural (22% of the population)	Total
Water	Improved water source	97%	91%	96%
Water	Piped on premises	93%	74%	89%
Sanitation	Improved sanitation	87%	79%	85%
Sanitation	Sewerage (2006 JMP survey & census data)	80%	16%	64%

Source: WHO/UNICEF Joint Monitoring Program (JMP/2010). Data for water and Sanitation based on the WHO World Health Survey (2003) and the Census (2000).

Among the achievements is a significant increase in access to piped water supply in urban areas (96.4%) as well as in rural areas (69.4%) as of 2018. Other achievements include the existence of a functioning national system to finance water and sanitation infrastructure with a National Water Commission as its apex institution.

The challenges include water scarcity in the northern and central parts of the country; inadequate water service quality (drinking water quality; 11% of Mexicans receiving water only intermittently as of 2014); poor technical and commercial efficiency of most utilities (with an average level of non-revenue water of 43.2% in 2010); increasing the national percentage of fully sanitized water which at 57%, is considered to not be enough, as the country's theoretically available percentage of water per capita is 60% lower than it was 60 years ago; and the improvement of adequate access in rural areas.

== Service quality ==
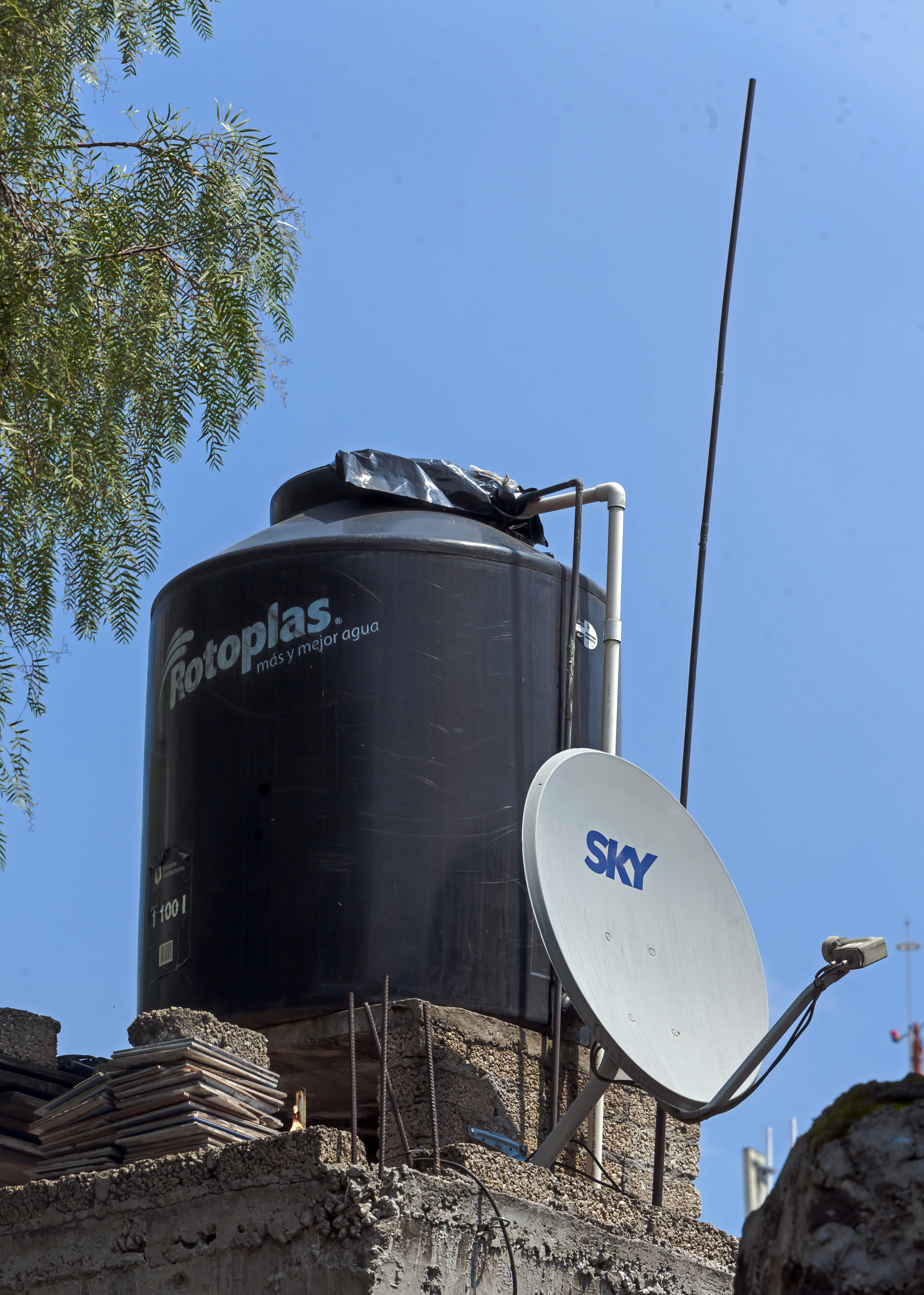
A tinaco atop a Mexico City home

Quality of service also leaves much to be desired. The 2000 census indicated that 55% of Mexican households with access to piped water received services on an intermittent basis, in particular in smaller municipalities and poor areas. About 36% of wastewater was being treated in 2006, a share that is more than twice as high as the average for Latin America. However, an unknown share of Mexican treatment plants do not comply with norms for effluent discharge.

In many areas, local water pressure is insufficient and/or unreliable. Thus, many houses have a small water tank known as a tinaco on their roofs. Water that accumulates in a basement cistern, known as an ajibe, is pumped up to it to provide pressure through gravity to the rest of the house regardless of pressure in the local system. In some newer homes, however, key appliances have their own pressure systems, Every year millions of cubic meters of wastewater, municipal, industrial and agricultural discharges are discharged into water bodies that are improperly treated or without any treatment. In Mexico, wastewater discharges are classified as municipal (urban and rural public supply) and non-municipal (other uses such as self-supplied industry). According to official figures, 52.7% of the municipal water generated is treated, and 32% of the non-municipal water.

=== Water use ===
Despite scarce resources in many Mexican regions water consumption is at a high level, partly favored by poor payment rates and low tariffs. In 2006, more than three quarters (76.8%) was used for agriculture, while public supply only used up 13.9%, the remainder being used by thermal power station (5.4%) and industry (3.8%). In 2006, all in all 77.3 billion m3 were consumed in Mexico, of which 10.7 billion m3 were used for domestic consumption. This means that the average domestic use per capita and day was 270 litres.

== Water resources ==
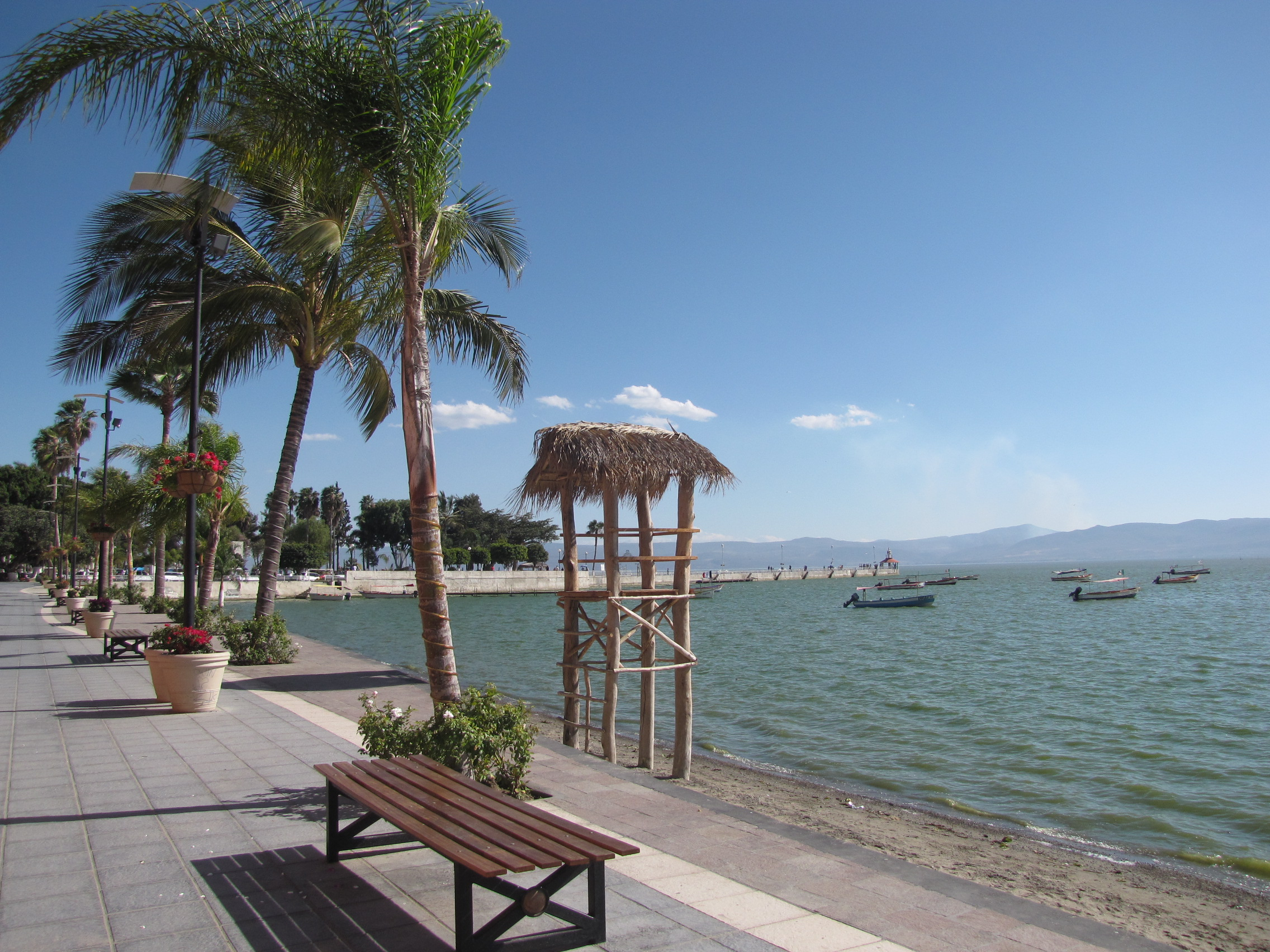
Lake Chapala is Mexico's largest freshwater lake.

In 2006, 63% of the Mexican water was extracted from surface water, such as rivers or lakes. The remaining 37% came from aquifers. Due to the strong growth of population and internal migration toward arid and semi-arid regions, many water resources in North and Central Mexico became overexploited. The UN claims that more than 80% of the world's wastewater that reaches the sea and rivers is untreated. The WHO estimates that some 2 billion people drink drinking water contaminated by excreta, exposing themselves to diseases such as cholera, hepatitis A and dysentery. According to the National Water Commission, groundwater over-extraction is at almost 40 percent of total groundwater use. In addition, CONAGUA estimates that 52% of the superficial water is very polluted, whereas only 9% are in an acceptable condition.

Amidst the water crisis occurring in Mexico, Mexico City has been sinking downwards approximately 1 meter every year. Due to years of draining groundwater for public and agricultural use, the negative effects of relying on groundwater has influenced the Mexican government to call attention to a campaign titled "February 2010: The City May Run Out of Water." Mexico continues to pump out groundwater from deeper ground layers, causing the drainage of soil and weak ground. According to the World Health Organization in 2015, approximately 100% of urban populations used at least basic drinking water sources, whereas approximately 94% of rural populations used at least basic drinking-water.

== Geological factors ==
=== Background ===
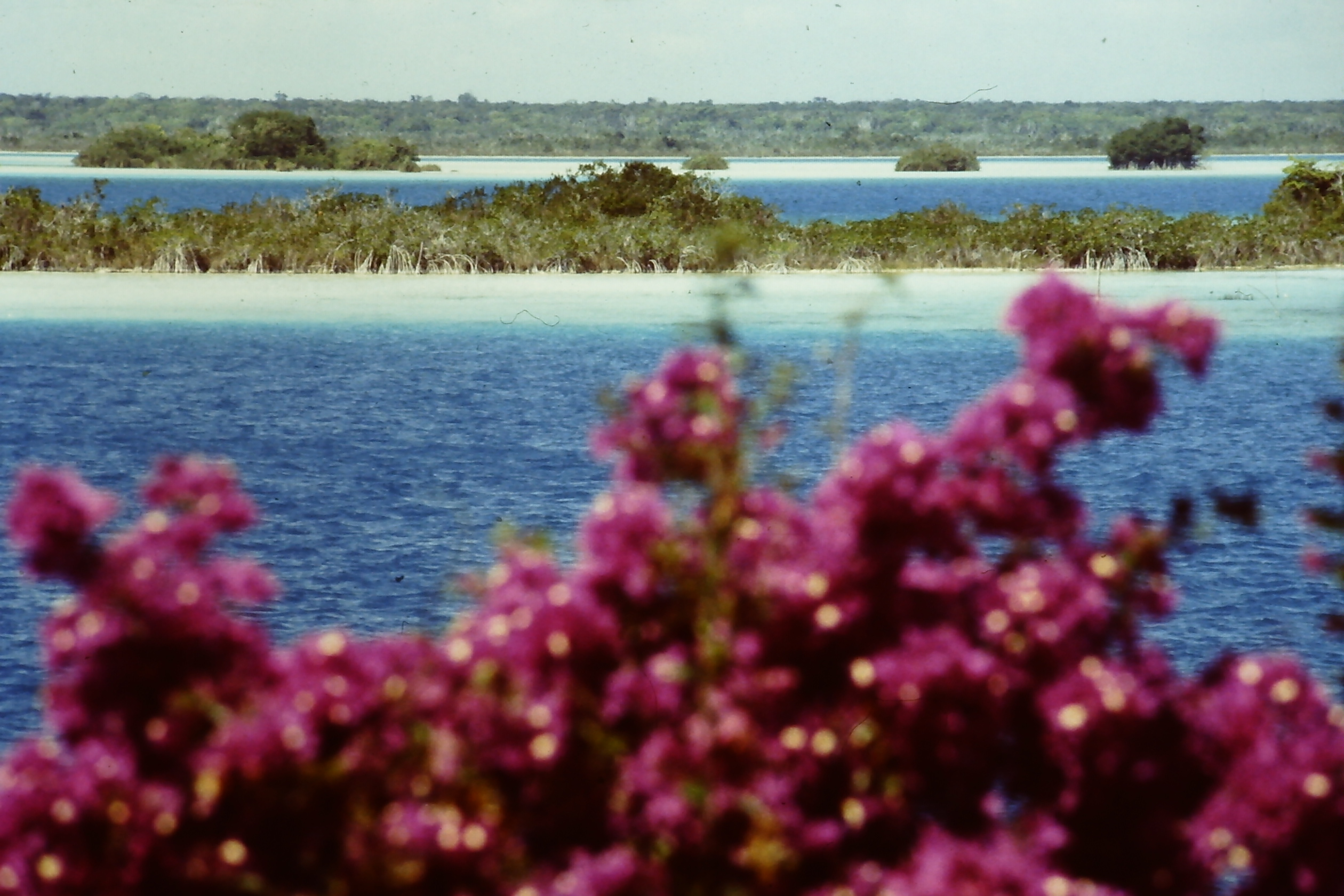
Lake Bacalar

There are three general facts about the evolution in the governance of water pollution: 1) Water quality suffers when there is low investment in environmental controls, little proactive effort in preventing sources of pollution and abandonment of observation systems and monitoring, in addition to the low investment in treatment systems; 2) Population growth and economic development increase the pressure on soil and water. The problem of water quality does not only refer to a lack of investment and political will, but it is also a problem of aligning investments in water quality in order to achieve greater economic growth. 3) Despite progress in addressing the flagrant causes of water pollution, all the nations of the planet face the challenge of changing established practices, as heavy inertia and a stagnant discourse persist in the way of facing the problem (eg no resources, no capacity). Mexico's climate is another big contributor as to why some parts of the country have relatively low accessibility to clean and safe water. First off, the country itself is split between two tropical areas of the globe that make for differing condition in different regions. Mexico's southern half sits in the inter tropical area of the globe and the northern half of it rests in the temperate area. Both these wind zones, Intertropical Convergence Zones and Temperate zones, have different wind patterns that cause dry climates in various parts of the country. Due to the different wind zones, two-thirds of Mexico is considered to be arid to semi-arid as they only receive about 500 mm of rain year round. The other third of the country is categorized as humid and receives more than 2000 mm of rain all year. Most of the areas with limited access to clean water are in the arid and semi-arid regions.

=== Droughts ===
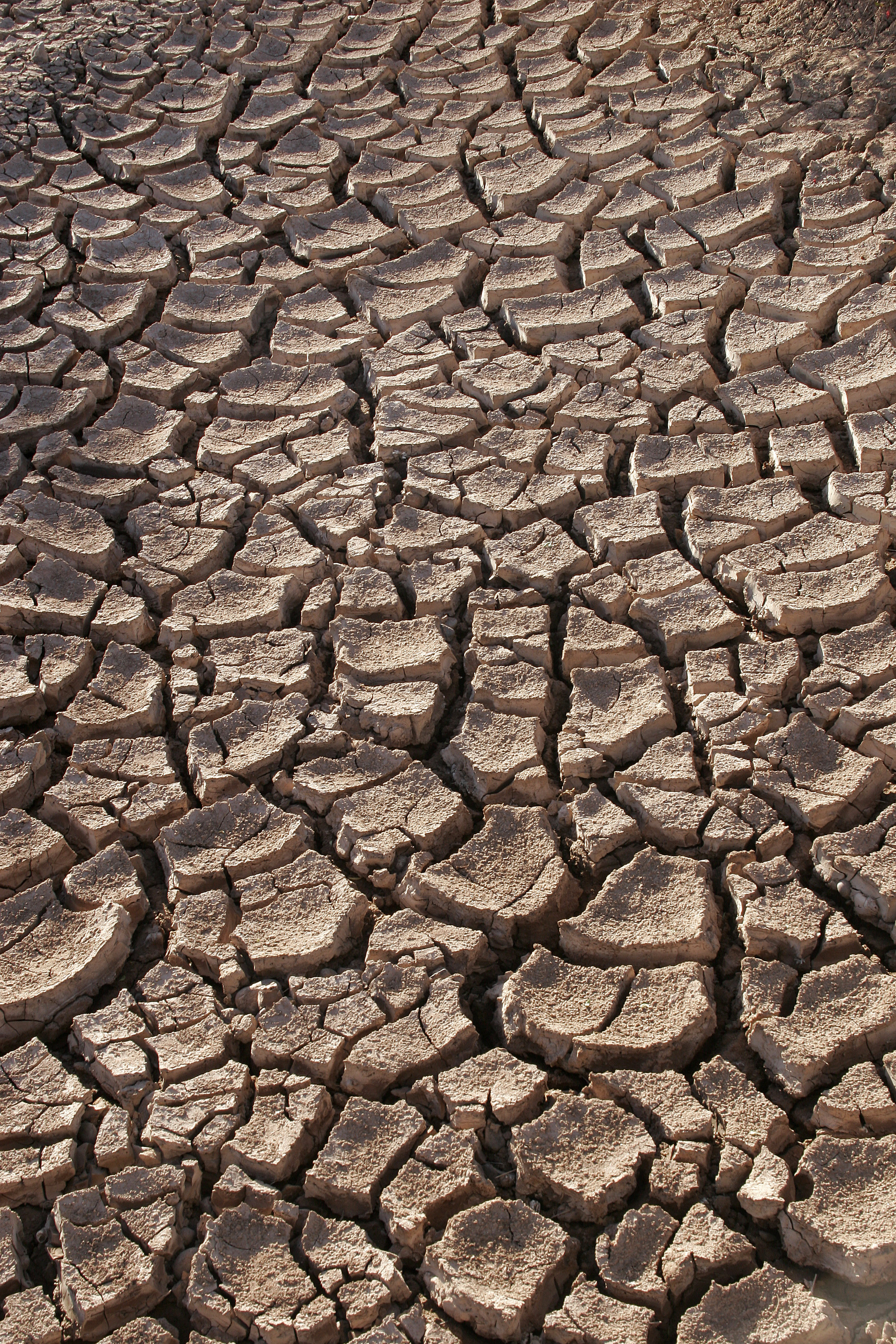
Shot of a drought in located in a Sonora, Mexico desert.

Considering most of the Country experiences arid and/or semi-arid conditions, droughts are one of the most common natural disasters in Mexico. Droughts happen when there are low levels of rainfall in a certain area. As a result, droughts significantly impact agricultural production systems that many people all over the world depend on. Droughts are also impacted by high temperatures that dry up pieces of land. Droughts are very common in all of North America and they have 5 levels of intensity. Regions of Mexico which most commonly experience drought-like conditions range from Veracruz, Tabasco, and the Yucatán. In May 2016, 14.3% of land surface area in Mexico experienced dramatic shift in drought levels from moderate to extreme. The month of November is primarily known as the time of year when the wet season ends and the dry season begins. However, in November 2016, regions in the Yucatán peninsula and Tabasco actually had non-stop drought with the previous dry season, regarding it as the 40th driest month ever.

=== Ground water ===
The groundwater found all over Mexico is used in various different ways. Three ways that groundwater in Mexico is efficiently utilized are in usage, distribution, and consumption. Regarding its usage, groundwater is extremely versatile in Mexico due to its physical characteristics. Since groundwater is mainly stored in aquifers, it is fairly easy to access year round thus, also benefiting the country socio-economically. As far as distribution, as mentioned before, groundwater is stored in various aquifers that makes available practically anytime. To be exact, Mexico has 653 aquifers placed all around the country. This in turn also relates to constitution since, 39% of consumable water in Mexico comes from sources such as aquifers. However, even considering the amount of groundwater resources available in Mexico, in 2016, aquifers mainly in Baja California indicating high level of saline soil and brackish water. 32 aquifers were identified with saltwater intrusion thus, still creating limited access to clean water.

== History and recent developments ==
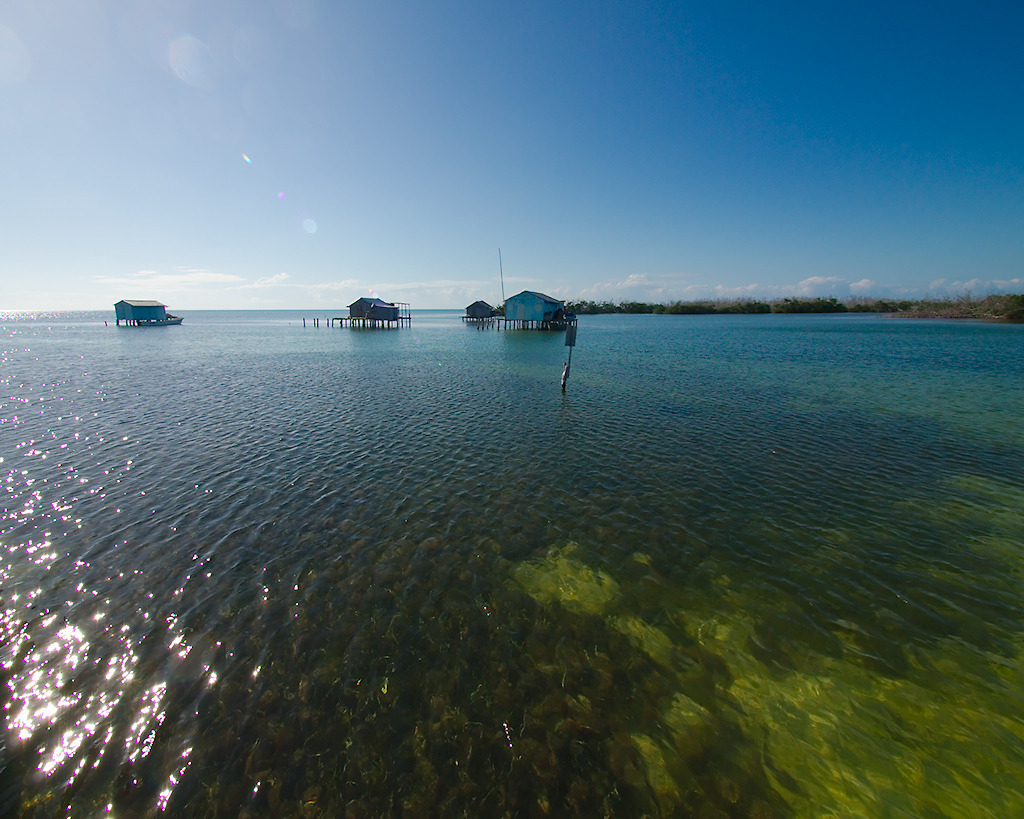
Stilt houses off the southwestern end of Cayo Centro on Banco Chinchorro

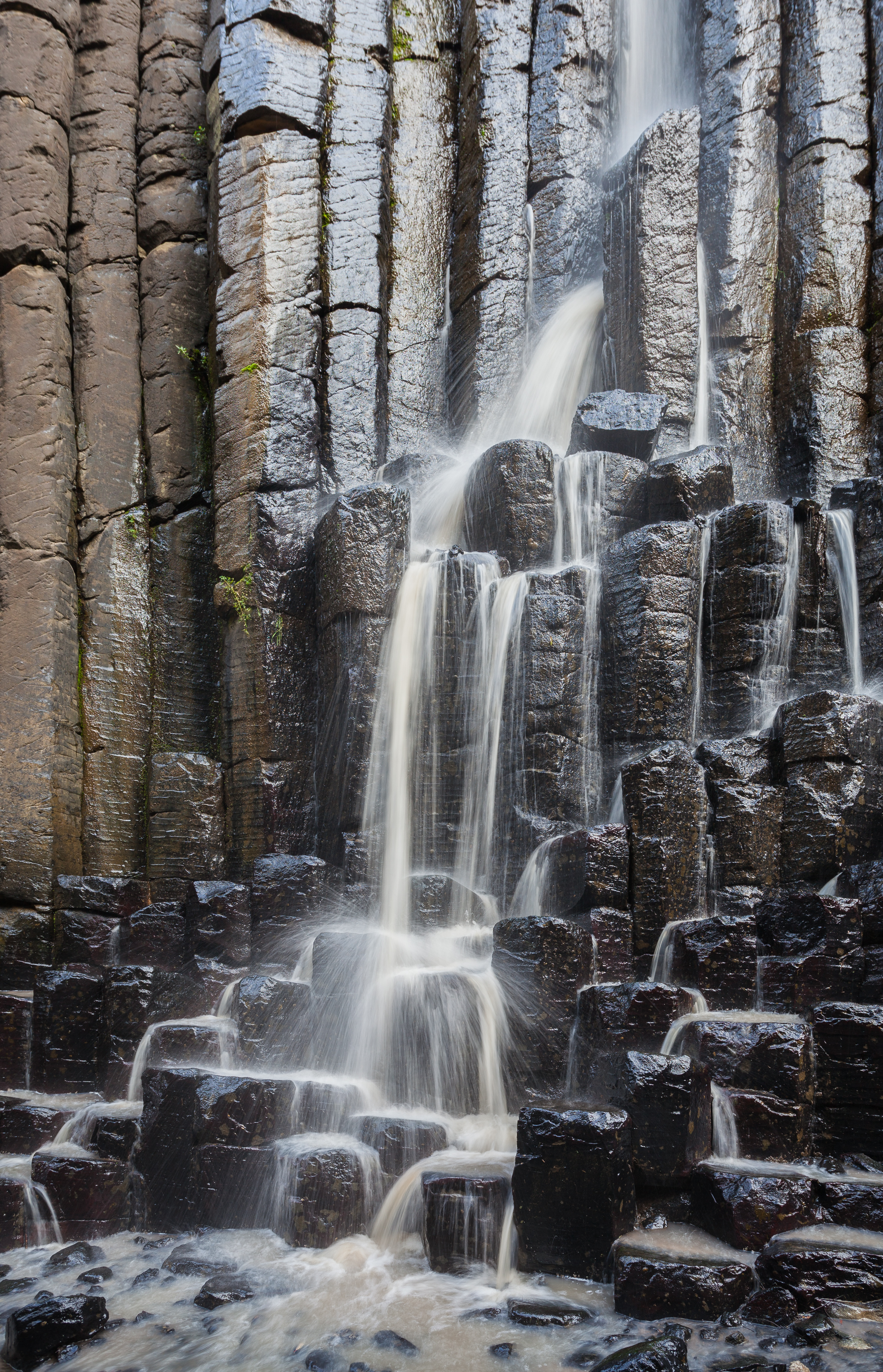
Waterfall over the Basaltic Prisms of Santa María Regla, Huasca de Ocampo, Hidalgo, Mexico.

In pre-conquest Mesoamerica, water was a deified resource that united indigenous communities. Water was thought to have been a gift from the gods and was thus held to a high degree of respect and protection. The indigenous people performed spectacular feats of engineering, creating complex water cultivation systems that both provided water to their large populations and sustainably preserved natural resources. The Spanish approach to water stood in stark contrast to indigenous valuation of water and commitment of environmental protection. Primary sources reveal the Spaniards’ initial awe of the ingenuity and complexity of indigenous water systems, especially the construction of Tenochtitlan (now known as Mexico City), the capital city-state of the Mexica empire that was built in the center of an enormous lake.

Preventing periodic and destructive flooding in Mexico City during the colonial era nearly forced the move of the capital to the mainland of the interior lake system. Instead, the Spanish crown invested millions pesos and mobilized tens of thousands of indigenous men in compulsory labor to build a tunnel and then an open cut trench to drain waters out of the Basin of Mexico. The Spanish facilitated a series of practices, which would eventually lead to ecological destruction, including constructing dams, burning woodlands, and diverting water from lakes and canals. The Desagüe was finally completed in the late nineteenth century under Porfirio Díaz, who contracted with British entrepreneur Weetman Pearson to complete the project using modern machinery to dredge a 47 km. trench.

The Mexican revolution of the 1910s brought sweeping changes, specifically in the area of land and social rights. In particular, the Mexican constitution, passed in 1917, instituted major land reforms, including the right to communal lands, known as the ejido system. This system specifically allowed for indigenous communities to legally own traditionally communal lands to live on and work. These land rights also included the ownership of any water resources within the territory. Moreover, the responsibility of water supply and sanitation was specifically designated to the federal government, a duty that was maintained for many decades post-revolution.

In the second half of the 20th century, the Mexican water supply and sanitation sector has undergone several changes of organization to improve its performance.

=== 1948–1983: Centralization ===
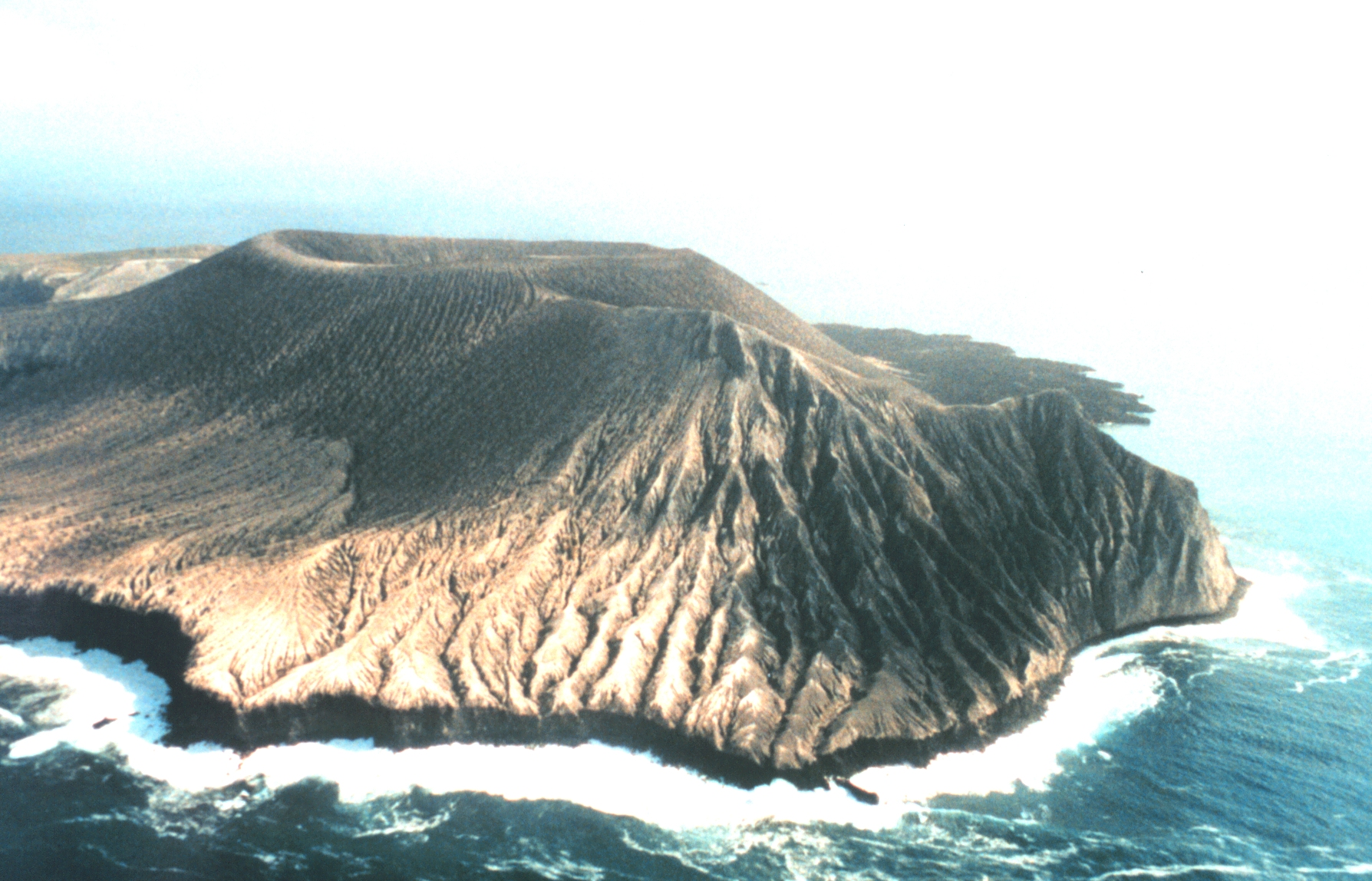
Montículo Cinerítico (front) and Bárcena (behind), volcanic cones on San Benedicto, one of the Revillagigedo Islands. Bárcena has existed only since 1952.

Since 1948, during the presidency of Miguel Alemán (1946-1952), responsibility for Mexican urban water supply systems was vested in the Ministry of Water Resources (Secretaría de Recursos Hídricos – SRH) under the federal government. For almost 30 years, the whole urban water organization was planned and carried out by the General Water and Sanitation Committee within the SRH. At the local level, federal Water Boards facilitated some local participation but actually also depended on the SRH.

In 1971, during the presidency of Luis Echeverría (1970–1976), a new committee for water supply and sanitation systems was introduced by SRH facing a high increase in urban population which exceeded the centralized system's capacity to provide services. Despite the creation of more specialized organizations at the national level, the federal government finally had no choice but to decentralize the services to the states and municipalities. The belief that water provision should be a gift from the federal government may be rooted in the policies of that centralization period. In 1982, the Mexican economy collapsed, precipitated by the drop in oil prices, and federal government spending was severely restricted.

=== 1983–1989: Decentralization ===
President Miguel de la Madrid (1982–1988), took office during the aftermath of the crash of the Mexican economy. During his administration, municipalities were entrusted with providing water supply and sanitation services within the framework of a general decentralization process. At the same time, state governments were made responsible for technical and financial assistance. They were also authorized to decide about the municipalities' capacity for providing the services. Most municipalities neither received the necessary financial resources nor the technical assistance to fulfill their new responsibilities. That is why in 1988 only 10 of 31 Mexican states had devolved responsibility to the municipalities and where they did, service quality and efficiency usually deteriorated.

=== 1989–1990s: Creation of CONAGUA and further decentralization ===
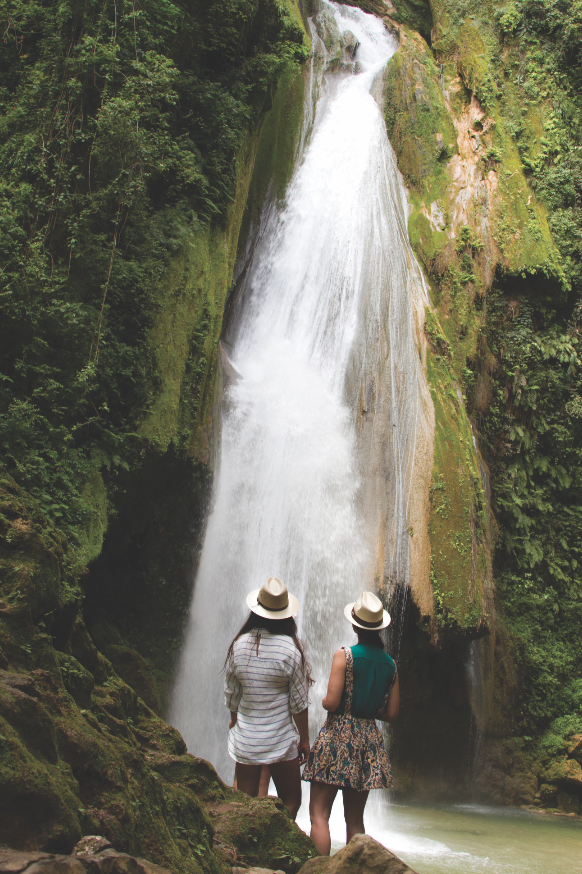
Ecotourism in the Sierra Gorda, the Chuveje Waterfall

President Carlos Salinas, elected in 1988, began a significant sector reform, creating the National Water Commission Comisión Nacional del Agua, CONAGUA) in 1989, which today remains a key player in Mexican water supply and sanitation (see below). At the beginning, it was given the task of defining federal policies to strengthen service providers through technical assistance and financial resources. CONAGUA, among other suggestions soon recommended to strengthen the decentralization process, improve the transparency of tariffs and introduce tariff autonomy, based on real costs for the service provision and free of political influence. Consequently, many water laws were introduced or amended, partly following CONAGUA's guidelines. In 1996, 21 states had transferred service provision to municipal service providers.

=== The 2000s: Proposals for new water laws ===
A 2003 modification of the National Water Law envisaged the transfer of certain functions from both the federal and state levels to newly created institutions at the level of river basins, including financial decisions through the creation of a National Water Financial System. The provisions of the new law remain to be implemented.

In 2015 the government presented a new General Water Law, requiring municipalities to ensure the financial sustainability of service operators. It also promotes associations of municipalities and private sector participation. Furthermore, it clarifies the relationship between federal, state and municipal governments, providing a stronger role for state governments. The law is opposed by civil society groups of the platform "Agua para Todos", saying it benefits the mining and energy industry at the expense of farmers and city dwellers. The water operators' association ANEAS criticizes that the law neglects wastewater treatment and does not sufficiently address the issue of centralized decision-making and red tape. There was little consultation on the draft law and chances of it being passed before legislative elections in June 2015 are said to be low.

== Water laws and regulation ==
=== The 1917 Mexican Constitution ===
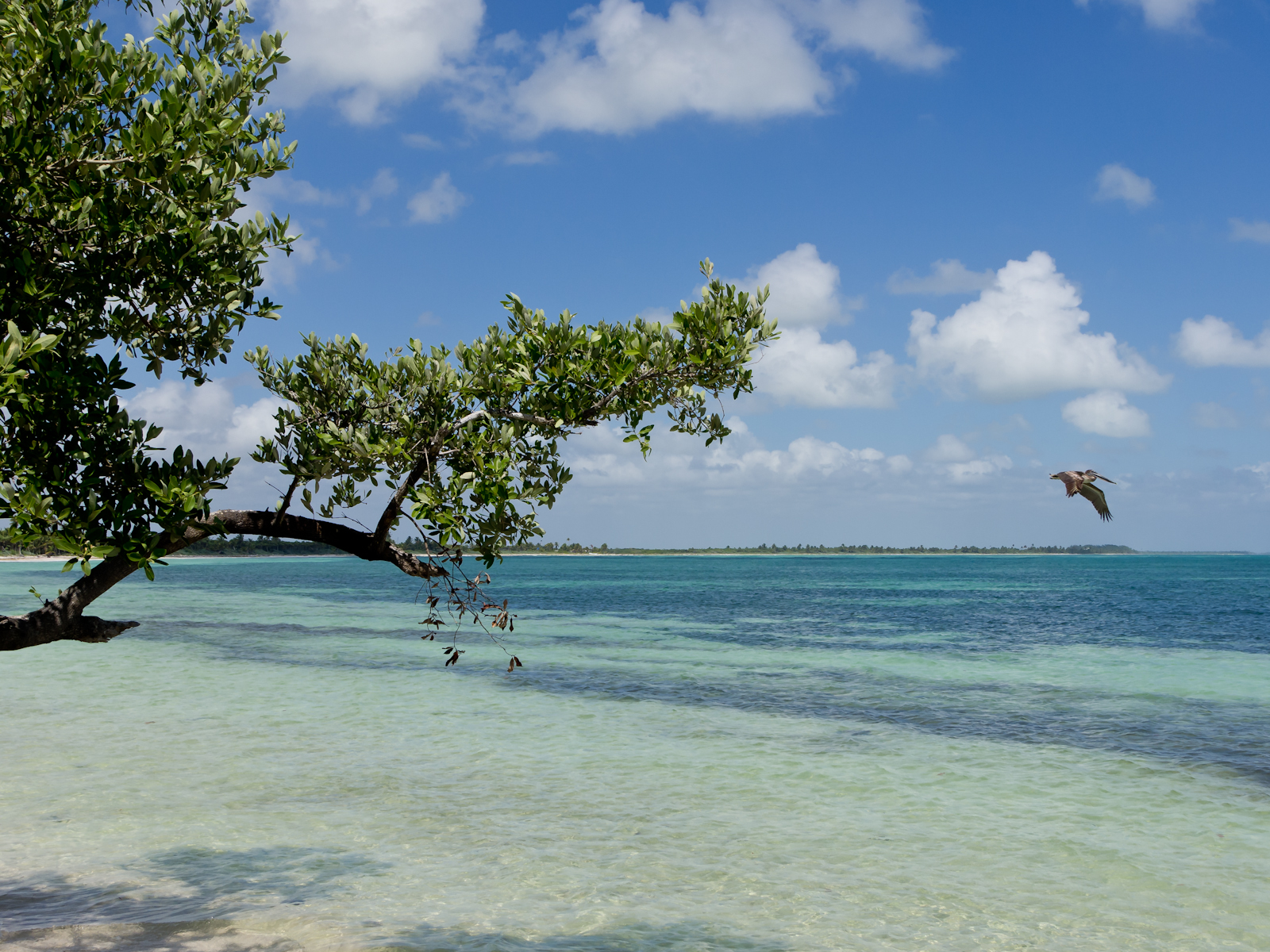
Sian Ka'an Biosphere Reserve

First and foremost, The Constitution of Mexico, which was originally established in 1917, states that all water in Mexico is considered “national waters”. This sets the premises that Mexico has the rights all water Mexico and can do whatever it is they please with since they hold the territorial rights. The only water that is exempt from such territorial rights is rain water, specifically before it hits the ground considering it has not touched Mexican Land. Mexico also has the rights to various natural resources similar to water such as soil, sea water created by salt mines and liquid petroleum. They also have the rights to all lagoons, natural lakes, rivers, streams, springs and other bodies of water that flow into the ocean, directly connected streams, flow in between different states, flow along borders of different countries, and extractable underground waters. The constitution also states that the nation has the right to regulate private property as social demands shift, including private bodies of water. Such private land will be regulated through building new infrastructure and simulating farming and agricultural process in order to see how much water is needed all with the intent of avoid such water to be exploited or damaged.

== Responsibility for water supply and sanitation ==
=== Policy and regulation ===
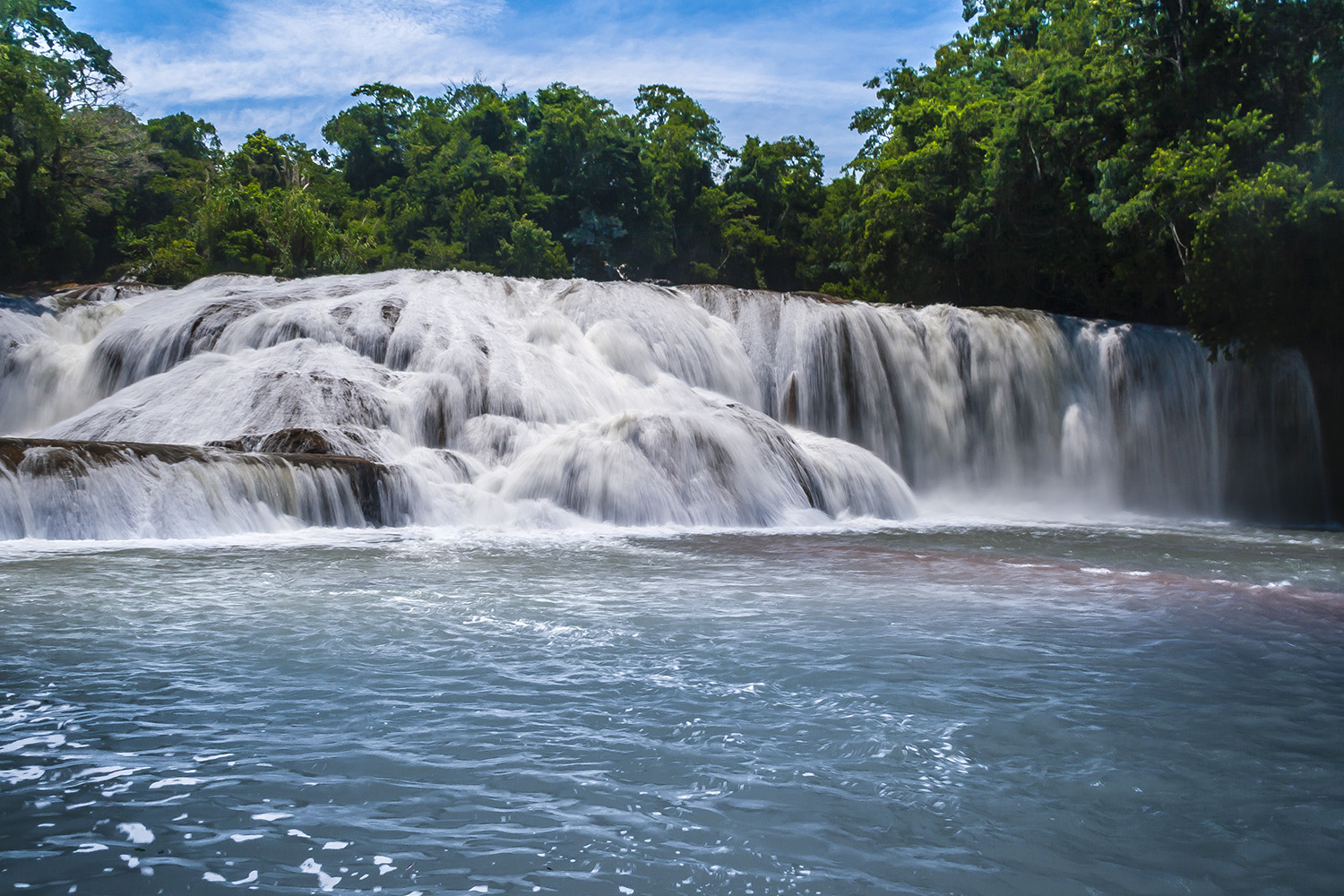
Waterfall Blue Cascade in Chiapas, Mexico,

Priorities at the national level are set through six year state development plans. The 2007-2012 National Water Program (Programa Nacional Hídrico) aimed to do the following:

- Improve water productivity in agriculture
- Improve access and quality to water supply and sanitation
- Support integrated and sustainable water resources management in basins and aquifers
- Improve the technical, administrative and financial development in the sector
- Consolidate user and society participation and in this way support economic use
- Prevent risks of meteorological phenomena
- Evaluate the effects of climate change to the water cycle
- Create a culture in compliance with the sector law

Federal policies for water and sanitation are set by the CONAGUA, which became a well-established autonomous entity under the Ministry of Environment. CONAGUA plays a key role in the sector's financial allocation. Besides water supply and sanitation, it is also responsible for water resources management, irrigation, flood protection and personnel services.

At the regional level, responsibility for water supply and sanitation vary among the 31 Mexican states. Most of them have created State Water Commissions (Comisión Estatal de Agua - CEA), which are autonomous entities that are usually under the authority of the State Ministry of Public Works. Most of them provide technical assistance to municipalities and some operate water distribution systems.

Mexico-U.S. water treaties are jointly administered by the International Boundary and Water Commission, which was established in 1889 to maintain the border, allocate river waters between the two nations, and provide for flood control and water sanitation. Once viewed as a model of international cooperation, in recent decades the IBWC has been heavily criticized as an institutional anachronism, by-passed by modern social, environmental and political issues.

=== Service provision ===
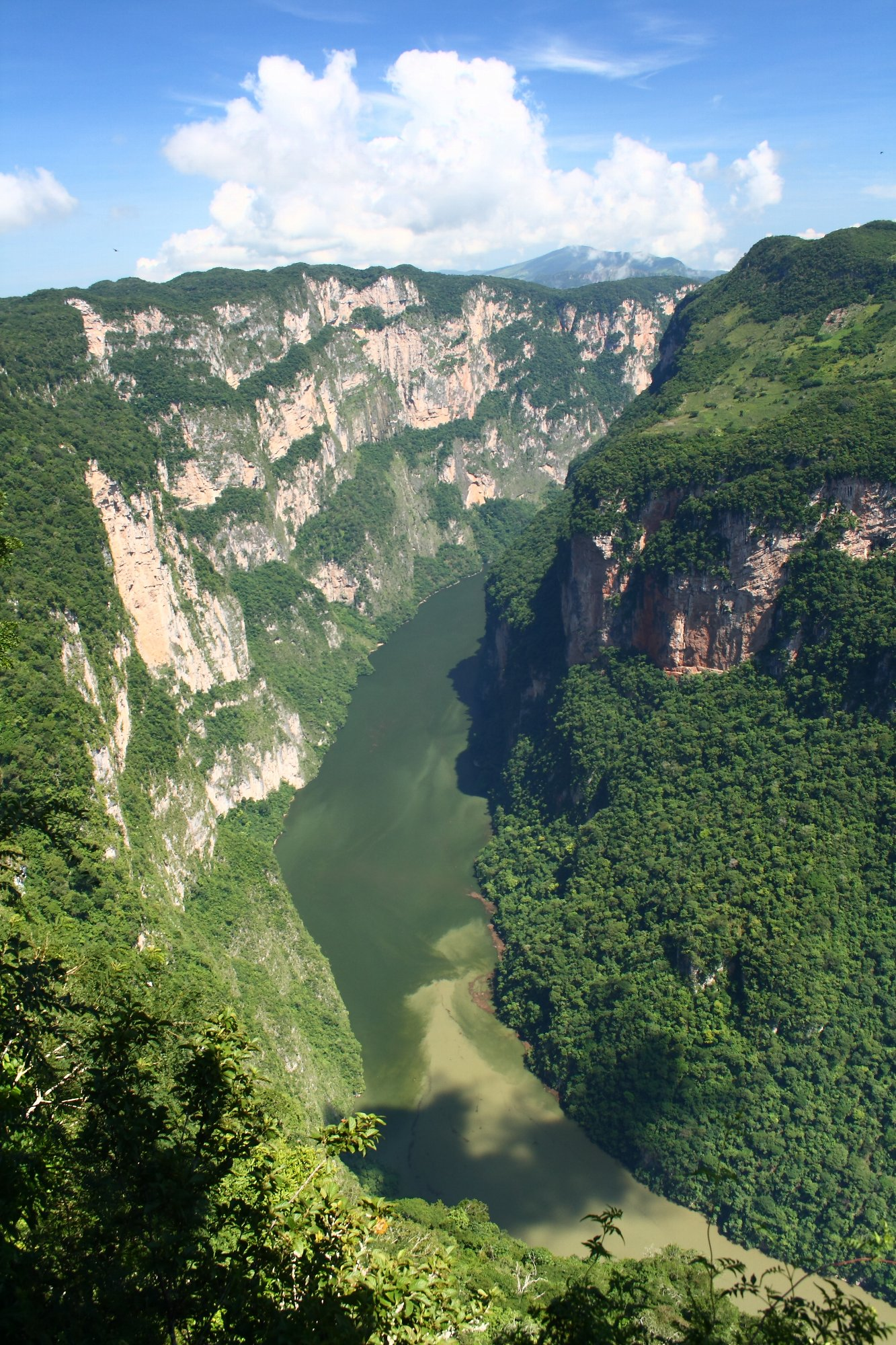
Sumidero Canyon (Chiapas).

According to the Mexican constitution responsibility for water supply and sanitation services delivery rests with 2,517 municipalities since the decentralization of 1983. However, a few states deliver services through state water companies on behalf of municipalities. In some cases, the state agencies directly provide water and sanitation services. In rural areas, water boards (Juntas) are responsible for water supply.

Due to different policies and programs at the local level, service is provided directly by municipalities or by cooperatives, public or private utilities, which differ substantially concerning size, autonomy, performance and financial efficiency. Although most providers lack political independence and financial efficiency, there are some notable exceptions that are efficiently operated.

==== Private sector participation ====
In three Mexican cities, water and sanitation services are provided by private companies as of early 2011: Cancun, Saltillo and Aguascalientes. The concession in Cancun, the largest of the three cities, is the oldest concession, awarded in 1993. As of 2011, it is held by Grupo Mexicano de Desarrollo (GMD), which is part-owned by Suez Environnement from France. The privately held shares in the mixed public-private company in Saltillo, set up in 2001, are held by Aguas de Barcelona, a Spanish subsidiary of Suez Environnement.

Services in Aguascalientes are provided by Proactivo Medio Ambiente, a joint venture between Veolia Environnement from France and the Spanish construction firm FCC for the Latin American market. As of 2011, the government planned to award further water concessions beginning with San Luis Potosí, Tijuana and Tuxtla Gutiérrez. A concession law that would improve the legal framework was under review by the Mexican parliament as of March 2011.

The state of Puebla awarded a 30-year water and sanitation concession to the Mexican company Aguas de Mexico in 2013, and in 2015 the state of Veracruz created a mixed company following the model established in Saltillo.

== Efficiency ==
The efficiency and quality of water and sanitation services vary widely, to a large extent reflecting different levels of development across the country. On average, the level of non-revenue water in Mexico in 2011 was 38% according to IMTA and 47% according to Conagua, almost twice as high as for well-run utilities. In 2011 as well, the average staff per 1,000 connections in a sample of 120 utilities was 5.3 according to IMTA, and 4.9 according to a different sample analyzed by Conagua.

== Financial aspects ==
=== Tariffs ===
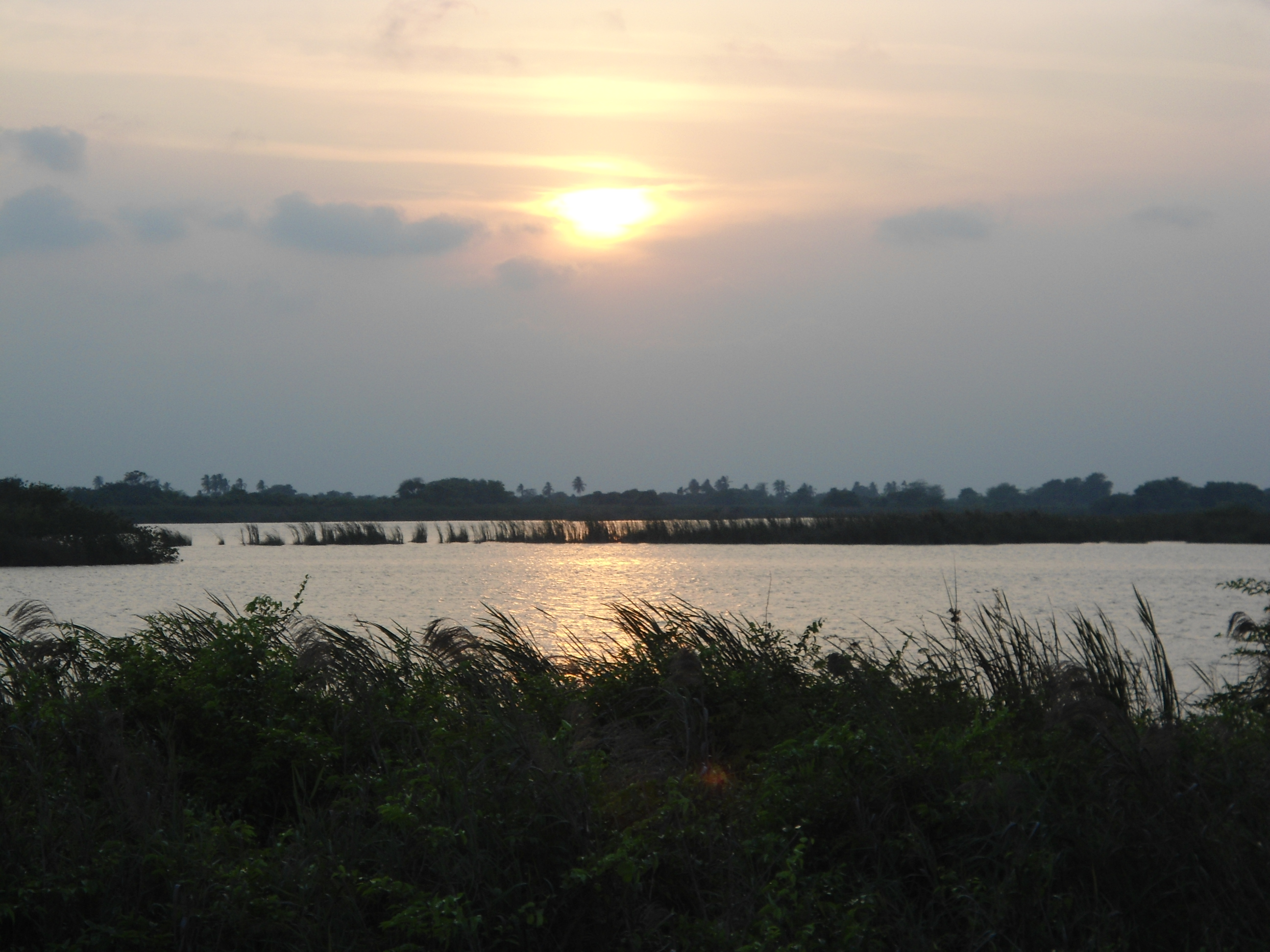
Pantanos de Centla (Centla swamps) view of the Centla, Tabasco.

The Mexican average tariff per m3 (US$0.32) is about half of the average in Latin America and the Caribbean (US$0.65). However, since tariffs are fixed at the municipal level depending on different legal frameworks, they differ substantially. Consequently, domestic users in Tijuana monthly pay US$1.1 for 30m3, whereas customers in Villahermosa only pay US$0.05 for the same amount.

On average only 72% of all bills are being paid. 31% of water customers are not metered and are charged a flat rate independent of consumption. Usually, commercial and industrial users are charged tariffs close to full cost recovery, whereas residential users are cross-subsidized.

Sanitation is normally charged as a small percentage share of the water bill.

=== Cost recovery ===
Since tariff levels and structures vary widely in Mexico, some providers fully recover all costs while others do not even cover operating costs. There are no reliable figures concerning water supply and sanitation revenues in Mexico. However, it seems that the sector as a whole generates a little modest cash surplus, which seems to reflect shortfalls in essential spending on maintenance and modernization rather than financial efficiency. According to CONAGUA, total tariff collections were US$2 billion (MxP21.2 billion) in 2006. According to a 2011 estimate by IMTA based on a sample of 96 utilities, only 73% of the total amount of water bills was actually collected on average.

=== Investment ===
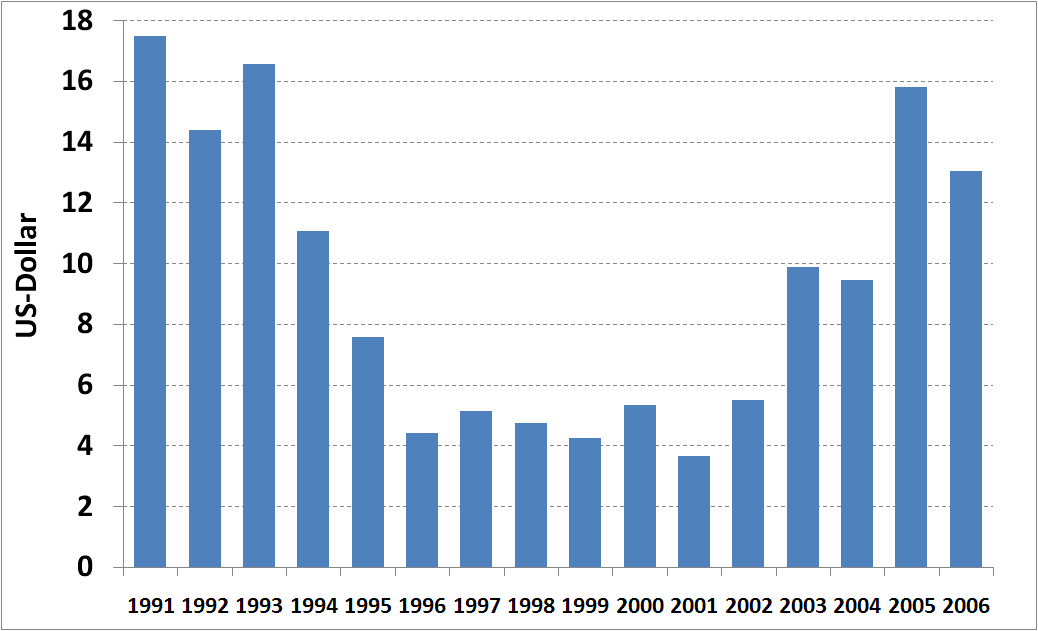
Mexican investment per capita in water supply and sanitation from 1991 to 2006 in constant US Dollars of 2006

According to Conagua, US$2.2 billion (MxP 28.6 billion) were invested in the sector in 2011, which is US$19 per capita. Compared to the investment from 1996 to 2002, which was between US$3.7 and US$5.5 per capita, this is a significant increase. According to the water operators' association ANEAS, Mexico needs US$6.6 billion investments per year to make up for historic underinvestment.

=== Financing ===
Investments are financed by federal (61% in 2011, up from 33% in 2005), state (23%, both in 2011 and 2005) and local subsidies (11% in 2011, down from 14% in 2005) and other sources (5% in 2011, down from 31% in 2005), the latter including self-financing, credits and private funding. Two thirds of the investment is channeled through several CONAGUA programs. Due to overlapping planning and budget cycles at the national, regional and local level as well as poor coordinated investment plans, project planning is very difficult.

== External support ==
Most water and sanitation investments in Mexico are financed domestically. Among the major external lenders for water supply and sanitation are the World Bank and the Inter-American Development Bank, which channel their loans to utilities through the National Water Commission. The Japan International Cooperation Agency (JICA) support a Potable Water Quality Control Project in Mexico City since 2005.

=== World Bank ===
The World Bank supported a US$300 million project in the state of Guanajuato from 2004 to 2009, of which 40% were allocated for water supply and sanitation. It also supported a US$55.2 million technical assistance project for the modernization of the water and sanitation sector approved in 2005.

=== Inter-American Development Bank ===
The Inter-American Development Bank has financed a series of rural water supply and sanitation projects in Mexico with a focus on decentralization, community development and participation. It began with a first US$560 million project approved in 1998 community development and participation in 20 states, followed by a second US$292.5 million project approved in 2005. A third phase with a cost of US$200 million was under preparation in early 2010.

=== PROME ===
PROME stands for Programa de Mejoramiento de Eficiencia de Organismos Operadores, in English translates to The Mexico Water Utilities Efficiency Improvement Project. PROME was established in 2010 and was dedicated to improve current utilities across the country to be more energy efficient. The Mexican government specifically instilled this project in order to reduce sector subsidies. One of the main focus areas that PROME targets are water utilities. Before PROME was even an idea in 2005, 98% of urban population in Mexico did have access to improved water resources. However, the resources from all 98% were very inefficient due to the lack of financial stability from their providers and high rates of efficiency. PROME sought to tackle both these issue head on in order to provide the most quality water services in Mexico. This project also worked hand-in-hand with Mexico's National Water Commission (CONAGUA). Together, some of the results seen from CONAGUA and PROME included: working with 91 water utility companies in 25 Mexican States, 12 water utility companies recorded an increase in commercial usage by around 5%, and SEPAL, a utility company out of Jalisco, had a reduction their water usage while their company was still growing thus leaving more usage for those in need.

== Organizations and programs ==
=== Lerma-Chapala River Basin Council ===
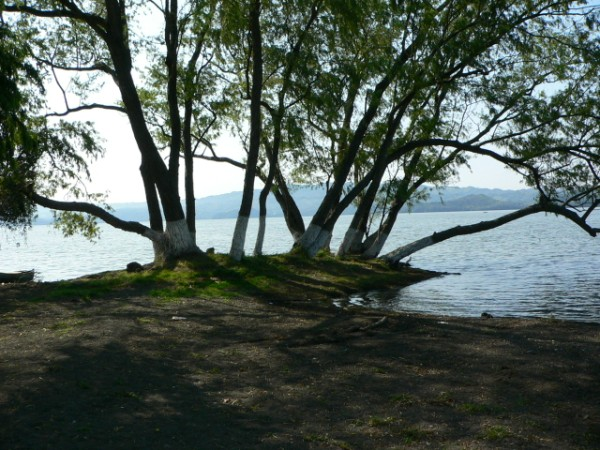
Laguna Catemaco

The Lerma-Chapala River Basin Council was first introduced in 1993 and was improvement council from the previous River Basin Council. The Lerma-Chapala Council was established by the Mexican federal government as well as five state governments. The goal of both councils were to created programs that allocate water usage among regions in Mexico City, Querétaro, Guanajuato, Jalisco, and Michoacan. These five states chose to establish this council because a river basin that flows from River Lerma to Lake Chapala and runs through all five of these states. There are approximately 11,300,00 total combined resident all five states that share this river, that also happens to be very shallow averaging 7.2 meters deep. There are four major water concerns that the council wishes to address: water scarcity, pollution, alteration to Lake Chapala, and alterations to the overall basin ecosystem. In order to address such issues the council focused their own efforts on having equal distribution of water by having policies set in place, treatment of river water quality, increasing usage efficiency, and figuring out how to conserve the basin.

=== Sierra Madre Water Program ===
The Sierra Madre Water Program was designed to help low-income villages and communities in both Mexico and Guatemala and is partnership between Water Charity, the National Peace Corps Association, and the Sexto Col Center for Community Action. Overall, the program is aimed at improving three things: access to safe water, sanitation, and health services to approximately 300 villages. They also hope to provide safe with the intentions of if being using for hygiene and agriculture in various households. Some of the projects here are working to implement safe water are improving and adding water technologies such building holding tanks connected to villages through a water line. Implementing more common things such as pumps, wells, rainwater catchment systems, water purification solutions, irrigation systems, aqueducts, etc. Depending on the village, this program will also be running sub projects that focus on health, hygiene, and sanitation rather than access. Projects such as clinics, bathrooms, and hand washing stations are a priority among health and hygiene. As of 2014, this program has already completed various village wide projects in 8 Mexican villages and still continues to do today.

=== Fundación Cántaro Azul ===
Fundación Cántaro Azul is a non-profit organization operating of Chiapas, Mexico that takes a multi-disciplinary approach to providing people throughout Mexico with access to clean water, sanitation, and hygienic practices. Fundación Cántaro Azul (FCA) undergoes a wide range of activities in order to achieve its goal. The organization primarily creates and provides communities with water sanitation and hygienic technologies, like home water sanitation, that ensure households and communities with good water quality and other public health benefits. Accompanying these activities, FCA conducts research to assess quality at project locations. Also, they champion education programs that promote good hygiene practices. They work closely with communities, as well as local health services, governments, and organizations, to ensure that each project is tailored to fit that community's needs.

== See also ==
- Water resources management in Mexico
- Water management in Greater Mexico City
- Irrigation in Mexico
- Pollution in Mexico

== Other sources ==
- (in Spanish) Comisión Nacional de Agua (CONAGUA): Comisión Nacional del Agua, Situación del Subsector Agua Potable, Alcantarillado y Saneamiento, 2012
- National Research Council, Academia Nacional de la Investigación Científica, A.C., Academia Nacional de Ingeniería, A.C.:Mexico City's Water Supply. Improving the Outlook for Sustainability, NATIONAL ACADEMY PRESS, Washington, D.C. 1995
- (in Spanish) Organización Mundial de Salud (OMS): Evaluación de los Servicios de Agua Potable y Saneamiento 2000 en Las Américas - Mexico
- World Bank: Integrated River Basin Management - Case 5: The Lerma-Chapala River Basin, Mexico (February 2006)
- World Bank: The role of water policy in Mexico. En breve. -- no. 95 (October 2006)
- Campanaro, Alessandra; Rodriguez, Diego J.; Amilpa, Enrique Aguilar; Loaeza, Eduardo Garcia-Lopez; Arronte, Pilar: Strengthening the Financial System for Water in Mexico - From a Conceptual Framework to the Formulation of Pilot Initiatives, The World Bank, 2014.
