= Irrigation in Mexico =

- Land area: 1,909,000 km^{2}
- Agricultural land: 56%
- Cultivated area equipped for irrigation: 22.9%
- Irrigated area: 55,000 km^{2}
- Systems: Surface irrigation: 58,000 km^{2}; Sprinkler irrigation: 3,100 km^{2}; Localized irrigation: 1,400 km^{2}
- Share of irrigated agriculture in GDP: ~50%
- Water sources for irrigation: Surface water (67%) and groundwater (33%)

Mexico, a classified arid and semi-arid country, has a total land area of 2 million square kilometres, 23% of which is equipped for irrigated agriculture. The agricultural sector plays an important role in the economic development of the country accounting for 8.4 of agricultural gross domestic product (GDP) and employing 23% of the economically active population. Irrigated agriculture contributes about 50% of the total value of agricultural production and accounts for about 70% of agriculture exports. Mexico's government initiated a number of structural reforms in the water sector aimed to introduce modern water management and irrigation.

== Development ==
=== Infrastructure ===
Of the 62,000 square kilometres with irrigation facilities in Mexico, about 42,000 km^{2}; (67%) are irrigated with surface water, and the remaining, some 20,000 km^{2}; (33%) are served by groundwater pumping. Approximately 33,000 km^{2}; correspond to 80 bigger systems, namely irrigation districts (Distritos de Riego – DR). The remaining 29,000 km^{2}; are distributed among more than 30 thousand small size communal and irrigation units (Unidades de Riego – UR).

The average plot size is relatively small, less than 1 ha is common, particularly in the irrigation units. At the same time, many landowners have farms larger than 50 ha and family farms, combining individual land holdings, may surpass 500ha.

Irrigation infrastructure and irrigated area

Water origin	DR (%)	Area (%)	UR (%)	Area (%)	System (%)	Area (%)
Dam	56	46	4	14	4	41
Derivation	17	11	7	20	8	16
Spring	1	1	4	6	2	3
Pumping	1	2	8	10	10	6
Well	10	10	74	47	73	27
Surface + Groundwater	15	12	3	4	3	7
TOTAL	84 DR	33,000 km^{2}	39,490 UR	29,560.32 km^{2}	39,574 systems	62,560.32 km^{2}

Source: FAO

The most important irrigation projects in Mexico are: Culiacán-Humaya-San Lorenzo Project, Yaqui River Project, Fuerte River Project, Colorado River Project, Lower Bravo River Project, Higher Lerma River Project, Lagunera Region Project, Guasave Project, Mayo River Project, Lázaro Cárdenas Project, and Delicas Project. These projects range from some 2,500 km^{2} to around 800 km^{2} of irrigated area each one.

=== Linkages with water resources ===
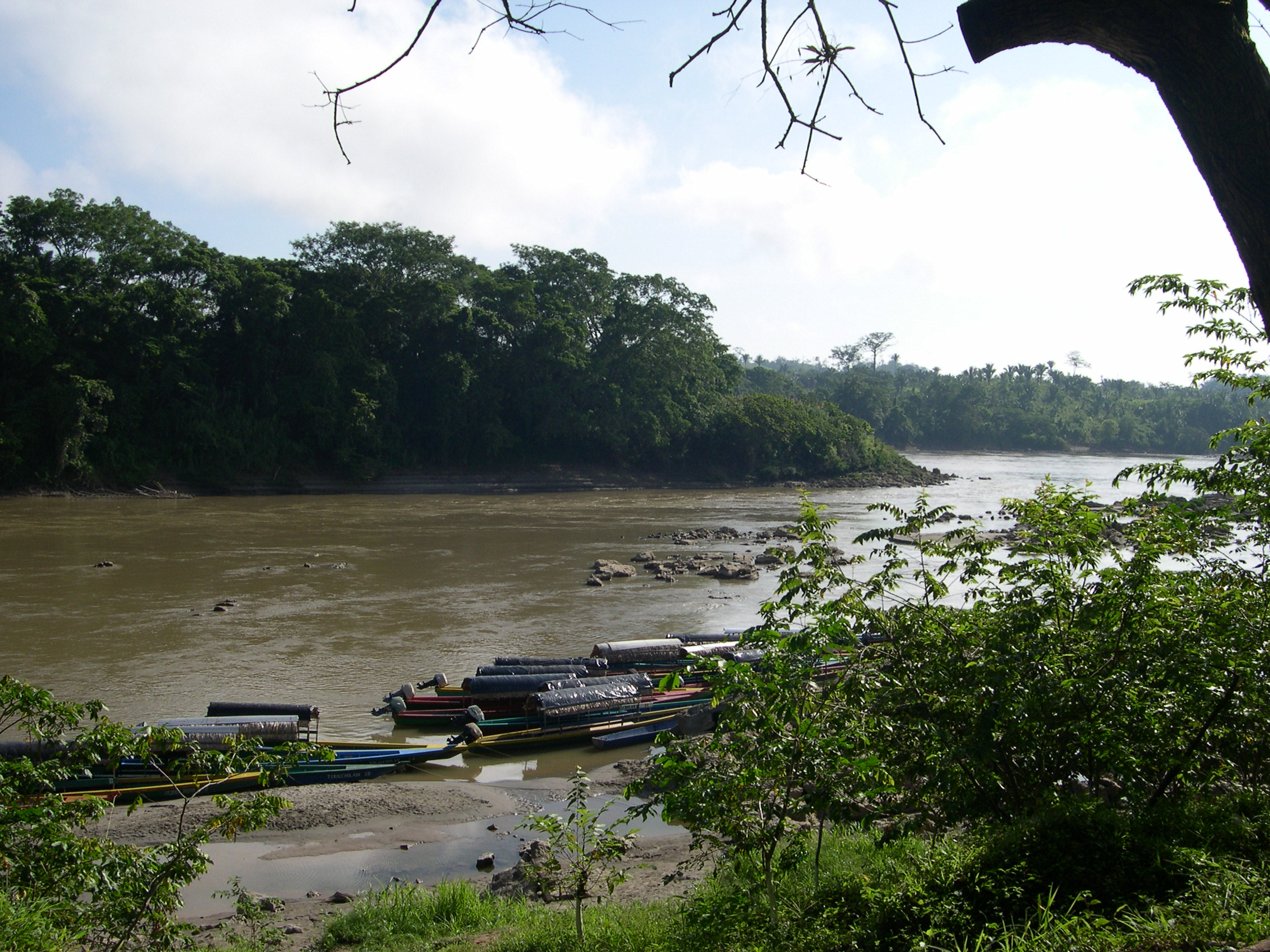
The Usumacinta River, taken in Chiapas. The far bank is Guatemala.

The mean annual rainfall of 777 mm results in a mean annual runoff of 410 km2, slightly more than 62 km3 of yearly renewable groundwater (including an estimate of 15 km2 of induced replenishment in the irrigation areas), and the remaining, some 1,060 km2, evaporates. Most of the country experience in rainy season, from June to mid-October and significantly less rain during the remainder of the year. February and July generally are the driest and the wettest months, respectively. Less than a third of the runoff from precipitation occurs within 75% of the national territory, where most of the irrigated land is located.

In 1995, 61 km3 were used for irrigation, 67% of which was supplied by superficial water, 33% from groundwater. Only 40 km3 were actually used, due to inefficiencies related with water canals and evapotranspiration.

There are three main watersheds in Mexico: the Western or Pacific Watershed, the Eastern or Atlantic Watershed (Gulf of Mexico and Caribbean) and the Inland Watershed, where rivers do not empty out into the sea. Two thirds of the country's 146 rivers drain into the Pacific Ocean.

There are approximately 100 rivers in the Western or Pacific Watershed, the most important in terms of water flow being the Balsas, Colorado, Culliacan, Fuerte, Lerma-Santiago, Verde, and Yaqui rivers.

The Eastern Watershed is made up of 46 main rivers, the most important being the Bravo, Coatzacoalcos, Grijalva, Pánuco, Papaloapan and Usumacinta Rivers.

The Inland Watershed is made up of large closed basins. The Nazas-Aguanaval river system is the largest.

=== Environmental impact ===
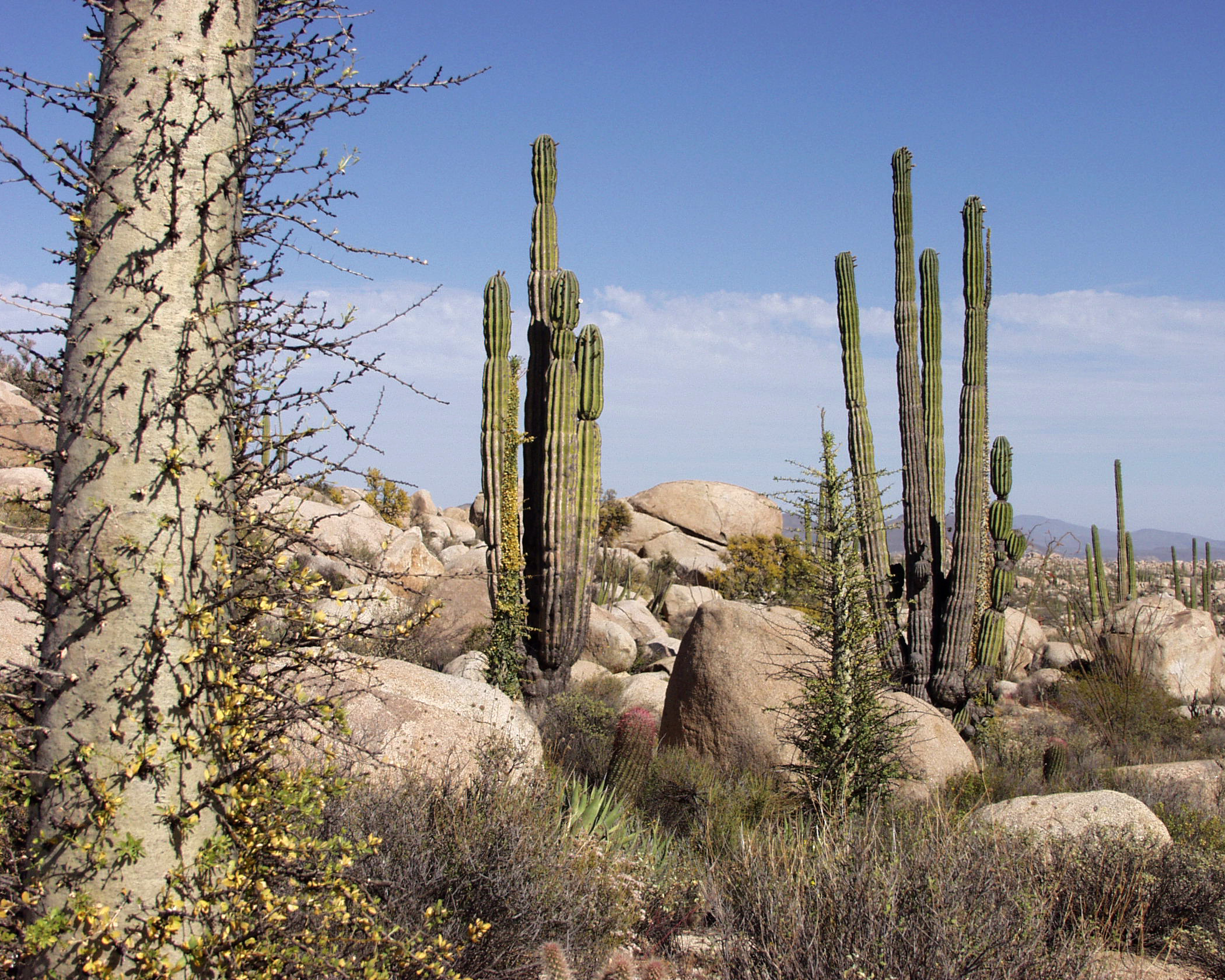
Baja California desert, Cataviña region, Mexico

More than 22 km3 of waste water are discharged into Mexico's water bodies. Agricultural use accounts for 50% of this volume, mainly in the form of nonpoint discharges with high levels or residues for pesticides, fertilizers, and other chemicals.

Vast expanses of southern and southeastern tropical forest have been denuded for cattle rising and agriculture. Deforestation has contributed to serious soil erosion nationwide. In 1985, the government classified almost 17% of all land as totally eroded, 31% in an accelerated state of erosion, and 38% showing signs of incipient erosion.

Soil destruction is particularly pronounced in the north and northwest, with more than 60% of land considered in a total or accelerated state of erosion. Fragmented because of its semiarid and arid character, the soil in this region has become increasingly damaged through excessive irrigation with waters high in salt. As a result, desertification is spreading throughout the region.

Ineffective irrigation has generated salinization and drainage problems in 384,163 ha in a total drained area of 5,203,346 ha.

== History ==
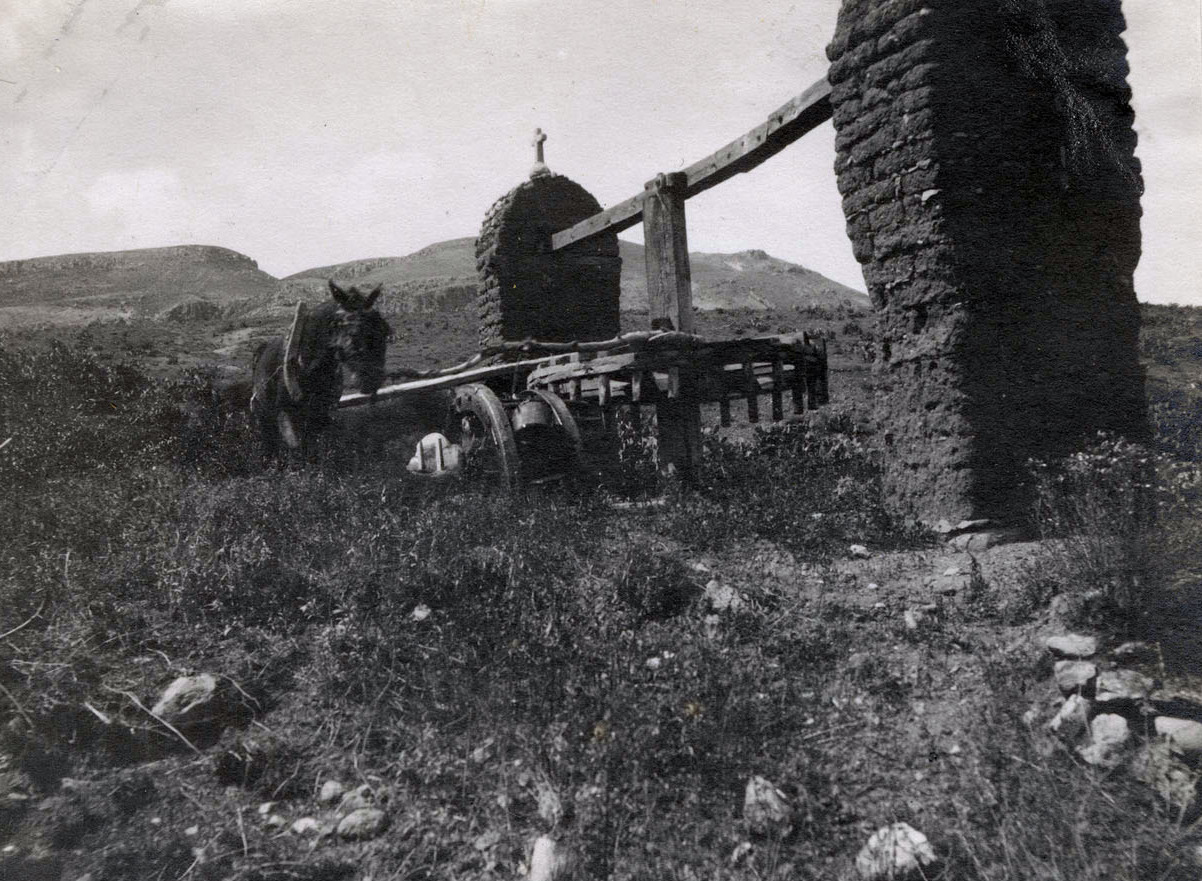
Irrigation in Zacatecas circa 1900

Irrigation development in Mexico was a governmental concern during the Porfiriato and was affected by the Mexican Revolution and the agrarian reform. At the beginning of the Revolution (1910), there were about 1.2 million ha of irrigated land. Much if this land had been developed by land companies, mainly American, to grow plantation crops such as sugar cane and cotton. After the creation of the National Irrigation Commission in 1926, the irrigated area quickly expanded, and the agricultural census reported a total of 4.3 million ha of irrigated land by 1960. By the late 1980s, Mexico had about 6 million ha under irrigation.

During the 1980s and 1990s, irrigation development slowed down due to the economic crisis. The irrigation sector focused then on optimizing the use of existing infrastructure. In 1997, the total irrigated area accounted for 6.2 million ha, 5.4 million ha were actually irrigated. The northern states of Sinaloa and Sonora, account for 15% and 11% respectively of the total irrigated land.

=== Institutional development ===
Food production requirements and the need to settle vast unpopulated areas in the northern region bordering the United States triggered the creation of the National Irrigation Commission and the enactment of the Irrigation Act of 1926. Water use was then low, even regionally and locally, so planning was undertaken project by project. Land reform, a stepping stone of post-Revolutionary governments, was closely related to irrigation projects.

In 1946, The Ministry of Water Resources took place of the National Irrigation Commission and, for the first time, responsibility for water development was concentrated within the realm of a single ministry. Water use increased substantially as a result of the economic development policies, especially for the industrial sector.

During the 1940s and 1950s, River Basin Commissions were created to launch regional development programs sustained by water-related projects. In 1975, the first National Water Plan provided a framework for improving water resources management consistent with national and regional objectives. In 1976, the National Water Plan Commission was created to implement the plan and update it systematically. Also in 1976, the Ministries of Water Resources and Agriculture become the Ministry of Agriculture and Water Resources, mainly to unify governmental actions directed at solving the growing problems of the agricultural sectors. This institutional change, however, caused a disintegration of water planning and management.

The economic crisis of the 1980s led to drastic changes in Mexico's irrigation policy. The National Development Plan (1989–1994) called for an increase in irrigation efficiency and the use of existent infrastructure. Under the National Program for Decentralization of Irrigation Districts, derived from the National Development Plan, Mexican government initiated the management transfer of irrigation districts to Water User Organizations (WUOs). The National Program, implemented by CONAGUA, originally planned the transfer of operation and maintenance of 21 irrigation districts, comprising 1.98million ha. To date, actual targets far exceed the target of 1.98 million ha of area during the 1990–1994 period.

== Legal and institutional framework ==
=== Legal framework ===
In 1992, the Mexican government issued the renewed federal National Water Law (NWL), and the corresponding Regulations issued in 1994. These legal instruments, together with the Mexican Constitution, are the main judicial basis for water and irrigation management in the country, and entitle the nation with the original property of practically all waters.

The NWL explicitly declares sustainable development as its primary objective. Furthermore, the last is consistent with Mexico's initial efforts related to decentralization, water-user participation, efficient use of water, expanded participation of the private sector, and fiscal policies related to the collection water levies for both water use and water pollution control.

=== Institutional framework ===
The National Water Commission (Comisión Nacional de Agua – CONAGUA) was created in 1989, as the National Water Authority an autonomous agency under the Ministry of Environment and Natural Resources. CONAGUA should coordinate investments in the water sector, setting priorities reflecting each river basin's actual situation.

The Instituto Mexicano de Technología del Agua (IMTA) was created in 1986 to foster the technological effort needed for a policy implementation, especially in relation to efficient use of water and conservation of water quality in every sector of water use.

Officers from both Government agencies have close contact and relationships with the people managing the Irrigation Districts.

Concerning irrigation, there are three main groups of institutions: the irrigation districts, the irrigation units, and small private irrigation schemes.

The irrigation districts, covering 3.4 million ha (or 53% of the irrigated area), are large-scale irrigation schemes supplied mainly with surface water and some with groundwater. The responsibility for their operation and maintenance (O&M) has been transferred to water users associations (Asociaciones Civiles de Ususarios – WUAs) in the 1990s except for 5% of the area that is still operated by CONAGUA as well as some of the upstream infrastructure such as dams and large canals.

The irrigation units, covering about 2 million ha (or 32% of the irrigated area), are smaller public irrigation schemes, supplied from both surface and groundwater and operated and maintained from their inception by agricultural producers.

Small private irrigation schemes, covering about 0.9 million ha (15% of the irrigation area) are supplied primarily from groundwater. Agricultural producers carry out O&M.

The National Federation of Users of Irrigation Water (Asociación Nacional de Usuarios de Riego), established in 1994, represents the interests of WUAs in negotiations with the Government.

=== On-farm water management ===
Agricultural producers who are interested in organizing a common irrigation systems form Water User Associations (WUA). The 1992 National Water Law (Ley de Aguas Nacionales), and the implementing regulation of the 1004, Law on National Waters (Reglamento de la Ley de Aguas Nacionales) recognize WUAs as civil non-profit associations responsible for irrigation infrastructure management as well as management of Irrigation Districts and Irrigation Units. Despite the increasing role of agricultural producers, CONAGUA remains the sector's dominant player in terms of policies, subsidies, programs and norms.

WUA consist of water users and its functions are the delivery of irrigation water and operation and maintenance of canals and dispute settlement. WUAs can also construct their own infrastructure or participate in government-financed construction projects. WUAs shall keep and update a register of members and their respective water rights.

WUAs can be granted water rights. In order to be granted water rights, WUAs must adopt an internal statute that indicates, among others: conditions for water distribution and management, internal organization of the WUA, rights and duties of members, provisions on financial management (income and expenditures), provisions for the transfer of water rights among members and provisions on dissolution of the WUA.

WUAs sources of income are revenues from the collection of service charges and membership dues.

=== Key Legal issues that arise in irrigation PPPs ===
There are a number of legal and commercial issues that will affect how these projects move forward and are structured. Whilst some of the legal issues are not confined to irrigation public-private partnerships (PPPs), they can take on a new dimension and complexity when applied to irrigation: Land ownership; water extraction; public sector counterpart. These will be key issues in a PPP as the private provider will want to ensure a steady revenue stream.

There are also the usual legal considerations that need to be checked when developing PPPs in any sector, such as legal restrictions on the type of PPP arrangement that can be entered into, relevant procurement rules for entering into PPPs, existence of restrictions on foreign investment, taxation and potential for tax holidays and the ability to assign rights such as security and step in rights to lenders.

== Government strategy ==
The transfer of the biggest irrigation systems or irrigation districts (53% of total irrigated area) from federal government to water users associations (WUA's) is a key component of the new water policy (Ley de Aguas Nacionales, 1992).

Along with the transfer program, the government, supported by the World Bank and the Inter-American Development Bank invested in rehabilitation and improvement to irrigation and drainage systems and in operation and maintenance equipment that was transferred to the WUAs along with the systems. This has resulted in some improvement in operation and maintenance, WUAs financial sustainability and fewer conflicts between users.

== Water tariff and cost recovery ==
Water tariff for irrigation fluctuates between the US$40 ha/year for irrigation systems supplied by surface water and 150-200 US$ ha/year for irrigation systems supplied by groundwater. Water tariffs had to cover both the cost of operation, administration and maintenance at the module level and the module's share of costs at the main canal and water-source level.

Water charges are determined for each perimeter by the respective WUA. The tariff is to be calculated every year by dividing the estimated O&M budget by the amount of water authorized for each module. However, this would imply that water services are charged by volume. In fact, fees are assessed by total area, by irrigated area, by type of crop, and by cultivated area, and only in a few cases by volume. In most irrigation districts, users are required to pay for service in advance. Thus, most of the WUAs receive most of their income at the beginning of the irrigation circle. Even during drought and financial crisis, more than 90% of users paid water charges.

Cost recovery in the IDs contributes for 72% of O&M costs, which is considered low. Between 1998 and 2002, farmers covered more than 90% of the administration and O&M costs in 14 out of 82 IDs. In the other 68 IDs the cost recovery was lower.

== Investment and financing ==
The overall expenditure in the water sector approached US$3.9 billion in 2004, or 0.5% of the GDP. Of this amount, the public sector spent over US$3.5 billion, which is close to 2.5% of Mexico's budget, while the private sector accounted for the rest. A significant share of resources spent in the sector, including both investment and recurrent expenditures, comes directly or indirectly from water users. CONAGUA accounts for 30% of total expenditures in the water sector.

From 2000 to 2005, CONAGUA invested US$1.28 million in the irrigation sector, or about 40% of the overall CONAGUA investments. Seventy percent of those investments were allocated to the IDs and 30% were allocated to the IUs. Most CONAGUA investment programs are co-financed with the States and farmers. For example, in 2005, the Irrigation and Drainage Program (Programa Sectorial de Riego y Drenaje), was financed at 50% by CONAGUA, 15%by the States and 35% by farmers and the On-farm Irrigation Development Program (Programa de Desarrollo Parcelario), at 56% by CONAGUA, 5% by the States and 39% by farmers.

== Possible climate change impact ==
Dean at landfall in Mexico as a Category 5 hurricane

Mexico is prone to severe weather events including hurricanes on both Pacific and Caribbean coasts. Hurricanes contribute to recharge surface and groundwater reservoirs with increased water supply for cities, irrigation and electricity generation. Hurricanes also pose a threat to service delivery, infrastructure and ultimately to ecosystems and human life. This situation is aggravated by deforestation upstream as well as human settlements located in flood-prone areas.

With more than 85% of the Mexican land area defined as arid or semi-arid and a highly variable inter annual rainfall Mexico is also prone to droughts, especially in the northern areas. The most severe droughts in Mexico in recent decades coincide with the variations in Pacific sea-surface temperatures associated with El Niño. The economic and social and environmental impacts of droughts in Mexico are notable. In 1996, four years of below normal rainfall produced farm losses estimated at US$1 billion and interstate political between Sonora and Sinaloa.

Climate change will produce a decrease in water flow and an increase in water demand due to increasing temperature, decreasing rainfall and more extreme weather conditions such as droughts and floods due to El Niño-Southern Oscillation and La Niña.

The IPCC estimates an increase in temperatures between 1 and 6 degrees Celsius. By 2050, the Mexican Institute of Water Technology expects a 7-12% decrease in precipitation in the southern basins, 3% in the Mexican Gulf basin, and 11% in the central basin. Precipitation is estimated to continue decreasing over the next 50 years. A diminished river flow will also contribute to higher evapotranspiration. There is also expected to see an increase in Category 5 hurricanes.

During some El Niño/La Niña years, winter precipitation may be so great that stream flow and water levels in dams may exceed those observed during summer. In contrast, summer droughts during these events can lead to serious deficits in reservoir levels and in rain-fed maize production. In Mexico during 1997, the estimated costs of climate anomalies associated with El Niño were 900 million US dollars, particularly in agricultural activities, when 20,000 square kilometres (5 million acres) were affected by a severe drought.

== External cooperation ==
In 1993, the World Bank approved a US$303 million loan to support an integrated irrigation modernization project. This project, whose closing date is 2009, aims to assist Mexico's government in its efforts to adopting a new model to improve the competitiveness of irrigated agriculture and the efficiency of irrigation water use, in both DRs and URs, that would include the development of partnerships between the public and private sectors as well as effective institutional collaboration within the public sector, plus the strengthening of a demand-driven approach to investment decisions and financing.

In June 2007, the Inter-American Development Bank (IDB) approved US$150,000 for an examination of the distributional effects of water reforms. The project is currently being implemented. In September 2007 it approved a US$200,000 project to support a program to relief damages caused by Hurricane Dean.

== Lessons learned from Mexico's model ==
The irrigation sub-sector of Mexican agriculture has been experiencing profound transformations, moving towards decentralization and market-oriented approaches in the management of irrigation water.

After the transfer, there is a steady pace of better maintenance in the majority of the irrigation districts. At present, most irrigation systems are operated and maintained by WUA's or farmers themselves, with only O&M of head works and some main canals of big systems remaining in the hands of CONAGUA. As the process of irrigation-management transfer advances is consolidated, the commission's role will dismiss.

Parallel to decentralization, CONAGUA is promoting participatory processes in water management through the creation of river basin councils and regional offices conforming to hydrological boundaries.

The new water law defined property rights over water and provided water users associations with clear rights, roles, functions and responsibilities. In addition, it was developed on already existing strong institutional and ideological basis for user representation in the new organizations.

The water markets that are emerging as a result of changes in the Mexican Water Law will bring about a reshaping of the irrigated agriculture sub-sector in the country.

== See also ==
- Electricity sector in Mexico
- Water resources management in Mexico
- Water resources in Mexico
- Water supply and sanitation in Mexico
- Water management in Greater Mexico City
