= Water resources management in Peru =

- Withdrawals by sector 2000/2001: Domestic: 12%; Agriculture: 80%; Industry: 8%
- Renewable water resources: 1,913 km^{3}
- Surface water produced internally: 1,616 km^{3}
- Groundwater recharge: 303 km^{3}
- Overlap shared by surface water and groundwater: 303 km^{3}
- External renewable water resources: 297 km^{3}
- Dependency ratio: 15.5%
- Renewable water resources per capita: 58,321 m^{3}/year
- Wetland designated as Ramsar sites: 68,000 km^{2}
- Hydropower generation: 72%

While Peru accounts for about four per cent of the world's annual renewable water resources, over 98% of its water is available east of the Andes, in the Amazon region. The coastal area of Peru, with most of economic activities and more than half of the population, receives only 1.8% of the national freshwater renewable water resources. Economic and population growth are taking an increasing toll on water resources quantity and quality, especially in the coastal area of Peru.

The government of Peru is currently undertaking a major transformation of its water resources management from a centralized approach focused on irrigation development in the coastal area to a river basin integrated water resources management for the entire country. The 2009 Water Resources Law (Ley de Recursos Hídricos) and the draft National Water Resources Management Strategy of 2004 (Estrategia Nacional para la Gestión de los Recursos Hídricos Continentales del Perú) contain the necessary elements for Integrated Water Resources Management as stated in international good practices namely, integration of sectoral policies, participation of stakeholders, decentralization of management to the river basin level and recognition of water as a social and economic good. Despite the new law, several key challenges remain, including limited institutional capacity, increasing water stress in the coastal region, deteriorating water quality, poor efficiency in the irrigation sector, as well as inadequate access to and poor quality of water supply and sanitation.

== Water management history and recent developments ==
The second half of the 20th century witnessed heavy public investments in dams in the Andes and associated irrigation infrastructure in the coastal region. For example, in the 1950s and 1960s, the San Lorenzo dam and Tinajones dam, the largest Peruvian dams, were built in the northern coastal region. Within the government the Ministry of Agriculture was given the responsibility to manage water resources, since irrigation was by far the largest water use. Its lead role was confirmed by the 1969 General Water Law No. 17752 (Ley General de Aguas—LGA) which defined the Ministry of Agriculture as the "National Water Authority". However, other laws—such as the General Hydrocarbon Law (DL 26221), the General Mining Law (DS 014-92-EM), the Law for Electricity Concessions (DL 25844)—also dealt with water resources on a sectorally fragmented basis within a centralized administrative system that gave little or no decision-making power to stakeholders at the local level. There was no legal basis for integrated water resources management at the level of each river basin, and consequently there were no institutions to implement such an integrated management. This began to change in the early 2000s with the approval of a Decentralization Law, a Regional Government Law and a Municipalities Law. In 2003 the government began transferring powers to the newly created regional governments, including for water quality management and the operation and maintenance of major public infrastructure, despite the limited institutional capacity of regional governments. A draft national water resources management strategy prepared in 2004 (Estrategia Nacional para la Gestion de los Recursos Hidricos Continentales del Peru) aimed at promoting integrated water resources management through a new institutional and legal framework. In this spirit a National Water Authority (Autoridad Nacional del Agua – ANA) was established in 2006 and its role was strengthened through the 2009 Water Resources Law (Ley de Recursos Hídricos – LRH). Implementation of the law and the creation of basin-level institutions with meaningful capacities and enforcement powers still remain a challenge. (See Legal and Institutional Framework below for more details)

== Water resource base ==
=== Surface and ground water resources ===
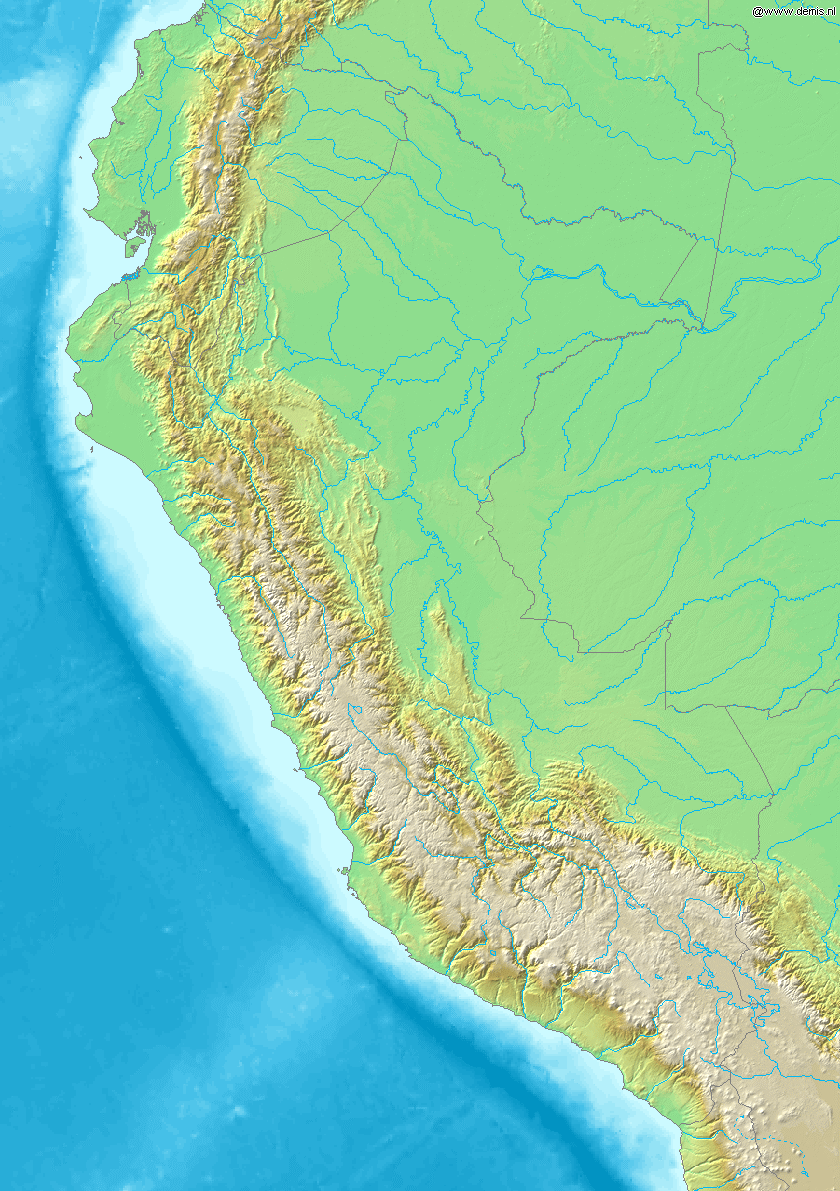
Topographic map of Peru

Peru has a large amount of water resources, with 159 river basins and a per capita availability of 68,321 cubic meters (m^{3}) in 2006. According to FAO the long-run average annual rainfall is 1,738 millimeters (mm). There is significant seasonal variability in river run-offs, two-thirds of which occur between January and April.

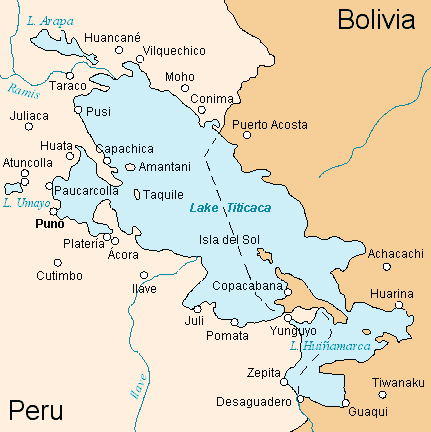
Map of Lake Titicaca

The Andes divide Peru into three natural drainage basins: Pacific basin (279,000 km^{2}), Atlantic basin (959,000 km^{2}) and Lake Titicaca basin (47,000 km^{2}). According to the National Water Authority (Autoridad Nacional del Agua—ANA), the Pacific basin has 62 rivers; the Atlantic basin has 84 rivers; and Lake Titicaca basin has 13 rivers. The number of rivers in Peru varies depending on the source of information, because in some cases tributaries are counted as rivers in their own right and in other cases not.

According to ANA, the dry Pacific basin, with 37.4 km^{3} available per year, accounts for less than 2% of Peru's renewable water resources. Its 62 rivers flowing west from the Andes supply the bulk of the water to the coastal region. Of these rivers, only about 30% are perennial. From 1984 to 2000, the average water availability decreased to 33 km^{3} per year and from 2003 to 2004 to 20 km^{3} per year. Agriculture accounts for the withdrawal of 14 km^{3} per year (or 80% of total water use) and domestic withdrawals account for 2 km^{3} per year (12% of total water use). The Atlantic basin holds more than 97% of all available water with nearly 2,000 km^{3} per year. Agriculture also accounts for 80% of water use, while domestic use accounts for 14%. The Lake Titicaca basin receives 10 BCM per year, less than 1% of the total. In this basin, agriculture accounts for 66% of total water use, while domestic use accounts for 30%.

Key characteristics of the drainage basins
Drainage basin	Population (thousands)	Water availability		Number of river basins
Drainage basin	Population (thousands)	Total (km^{3})	Per capita (m^{3})	Number of river basins
Pacific	18,430	37.4	2,027	62
Atlantic	6,852	1,999	291,703	84
Titicaca	1,047	10.1	9,715	13
Total	26,392	2,046.3	77,534	159

Source: INEI (2007)

External resources of water enter Peru though tributaries of the Amazon, in the Atlantic river basin, supplying 125 BCM annually. The main rivers are Napo, Tigre, Pastaza, Santiago, Morona, Cenepa, and Chinchipe.

ANA estimates the total amount of groundwater available on the coast to be between 35 and 40 km^{3}. There is specific data available only for eight valleys on the coast with 9.0 km^{3} of groundwater available. Around 1.8 km^{3} of water are actually extracted on the coast. No sufficient information is available regarding groundwater availability and withdrawal in the highland and Amazon regions.

Groundwater withdrawal per sector in Peruvian coast (5)

Sector	Water withdrawal (million m^{3})	Water withdrawal (% of total withdrawal)
Urban	367	20
Agricultural	911	50
Industrial	553	30

Source: ANA

=== Storage capacity and infrastructure ===
In 1980, the former National Institute of Natural Resources (INRENA) established an inventory of Peru's water storage capacity, including lakes and dams. Peru has 12,201 lakes, 3,896 of which are located in the Pacific basin, 7,441 in the Atlantic basin, 841 in the Titicaca basin, and 23 in the closed basin of Warmiqucha. INRENA inventoried 186 lakes in operation with a total capacity of 3,028.07 million cubic metres and 342 studied lakes with a total capacity 3,953.04 million cubic metres. According to the inventory, the largest number of lakes in operation were located in the Pacific basin, with 105 lakes and a total capacity of 1,378.58 million cubic metres, followed by the Atlantic basin with 76 lakes and a capacity of 1604.73 million cubic metres. The Pacific basin also has the largest number of studied lagoons, with a total of 204 lakes and a total capacity of 616.62 million cubic metres, followed by the Atlantic basin with 133 lakes and a capacity of 3,006.42 cubic metres.

Peru also has 23 dams with a total capacity of 1,941.88 million cubic metres, and 238 studied dams with a total capacity of 44,028.04 million cubic metres. The Pacific basin has 21 dams in operation with a total capacity of 1,875.88 million cubic metres; the Atlantic basin has 2 dams with a capacity of 66,000 million cubic metres. The Pacific basin also has the largest number of studied dams, a total of 126 with a capacity of 17,200.60 million cubic metres. The Atlantic basin has 105 with a storage capacity of 26,274.83 million cubic metres.

The largest reservoirs are Poechos with a capacity of 1,000 million cubic metres, Tinajones with 320 million cubic metres, San Lorenzo with 258 million cubic metres, and El Fraile with 200 million cubic metres, all of them in the coastal region.

=== Water quality ===
The gradual decrease in Peru's water quality is due to the release of untreated effluents from mining, industries, municipalities and polluted runoff from agriculture. Of the 53 rivers in the coastal area, 16 are polluted by lead, manganese and iron threatening irrigation and potable water supplies. In particular, the Ministry of Agriculture considers "alarming" the quality of seven rivers: the Mantaro and Tambo rivers in the Central Andes that drain towards the Amazonas; the small Moche River near the northern coastal city Trujillo and the Santa near the northern coastal city Chimbote; the Chillon and Rimac rivers near Lima; and the Chili River near Arequipa which is well known for its rafting. In the Mantaro basin alone 18 mining facilities discharge polluted water into the river.

==== Pollution from mining ====
Mining, which provided more than 60% of Peru's export earnings in 2006, is a major water user and polluter. It is estimated that mining uses about 5% of Peru's water. In addition, it severely affects water quality. It has been estimated that more than half of Peru's peasant communities have been affected by mining activities, leading to the creation of organizations such as the National Committee of Mine Affected Communities (CONACAMI). The government had to declare an environmental state of emergency at several mining sites due to environmental disasters. For example, in July 2008 it declared a state of emergency at a mine near Lima over fears that arsenic, lead and cadmium from its tailings dam could pollute the main water supply for the capital. In July 2010 the government declared another state of environmental emergency in the central mining district of Huancavelica after a wastewater storage dam of the Caudalosa Chica company collapsed and leaked water laden with heavy metals into local rivers. The city La Oroya on the Mantaro River in Central Peru where the company Doe Run operates a big mining complex has been ranked as one of the 10 most contaminated cities in the world in 2007. Furthermore, an estimated 100,000 small-scale informal miners pollute rivers with cyanide and mercury.

Often the exact scope of pollution is a matter of dispute. An example is the Yanacocha mine in the Andes, the largest and most profitable gold mine in Latin America that was created with the support of the International Finance Corporation (IFC). According to a report in 2000 by an organization called "Project Underground" levels of copper were 10 to 20 times higher than WHO standards and the acidity of the water was extremely high with a pH of 3.3 compared to 6.5, the highest acidity considered drinkable. According to local communities, fish and frogs had disappeared from the river, both of which were previously a food supply for the rural communities. Subsequently, an independent report by Stratus, a Colorado consultancy, found that the pollution from the mine "posed no threat to human health or to drinking water". But the mine's rapid expansion has affected farmers: Several irrigation channels have dried up, while extra sediment in rivers has killed trout.

In almost all cases, local communities are overwhelmingly opposed to mining because of its environmental impact on their livelihoods. An example are conflicts witnessed in Piura Province since 1993. A Canadian mining company departed shortly after a local referendum in Tambogrande in which over 93% voted against mining. When another company began exploration in Ayabaca and Huancabamba, this elicited new conflicts and a referendum held in September 2007, in which again over 90% of voters voted against mining. One of the main concerns of local and downstream communities relates to the effects that the mine would have on water quality and quantity. The company and the central government continued to insist, though, that the mine will go ahead.

==== Salinization of irrigated land and deforestation ====
Ineffective irrigation has generated salinization and drainage problems in 3,000 square kilometres of the coastal valleys (of a total irrigated area of 7,360 km^{2}), jeopardizing land productivity and affecting the quality of Lima's water supply. Drainage problems are also affecting 1,500 km^{2} in the Amazon region. In the highland and Amazon areas, excessive deforestation due to nomadic agriculture practices is causing erosion and soil degradation. In the Sierra 55%–60% of the land is affected, increasing the amount of soil transported downstream.

== Water resources management by sector ==
=== Drinking water and sanitation ===
Domestic consumption accounts for 7% of water withdrawals in Peru. The water and sanitation sector in Peru has made significant advances in the last two decades, including an increase in access to an improved water source from 75% to 82% between 1990 and 2008 and an increase in access to improved sanitation from 54% to 68% during the same period. Progress has also been achieved in the disinfection of drinking water and in wastewater treatment. Despite these advances, water supply and sanitation services in Peru are characterized by low coverage in rural areas (61% for water 36% for sanitation in 2008) and poor quality of service, as well as the precarious financial situation of utilities.

=== Irrigation and drainage ===
About 80% of all water withdrawal in Peru is used for irrigation, yet much of this water (65%) is lost due to reliance on inefficient irrigation systems

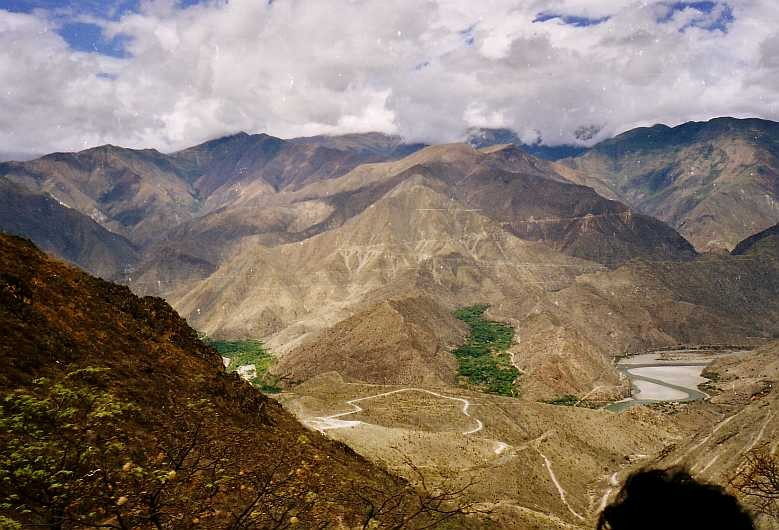
Irrigation in the Valley of the Marañón between Chachapoyas and Celendín in Northern Peru

Area with Irrigation Infrastructure and irrigated areas (km^{2})

Region	Infrastructure (a)	%	Irrigated (b)	%	(b/a)
Costa	11,900	68	7,360	66	610
Sierra	4,530	26	2,890	26	630
Selva	1,090	6	840	8	770
Total	17,520	100	11,090	100	

Source: Portal Agrario (1994)

=== Hydropower ===
In 2006, 72% of Peru's total electricity generation (27.4 TWh) came from hydroelectric plants, with conventional thermal plants only in operation during peak load periods or when hydroelectric output is curtailed by weather events. Hydropower accounts for 48% of total installed capacity. Non-consumptive water withdrawal for hydropower generation accounts for 11,138 million m3 per year. The largest hydroelectric facility in the country is the 900 MW Mantaro Complex in southern Peru, which is operated by state-owned Electroperu. The two hydroelectric plants at the complex generate over one-third of Peru's total electricity supply.

=== Aquatic ecosystems ===
There are 12,201 lakes and lagoons in Peru, 3,896 of which are located in the Pacific basin; 7,441 in the Atlantic basin, 841 in the Titicaca basin, and 23 in the Huarmicocha system. Peru contains approximately 50,000 km^{2} of swamps and 45 km^{2} of mangroves. Peru's wetlands play an important role for rural communities. These wetlands are the source for animal protein and for totora, a plant used in the artisan production of boats and floating devices. Estuaries are also fundamental for the reproduction of several marine species that are basic for the fishing industry. Other uses such as industrial production of algae and bird-watching tourism are not yet fully discovered. In 1996 the Government adopted a National Wetlands Conservation Strategy aimed at increasing the area of mangroves, moors, estuaries, and lagoons considered to be protected areas. Uncertainties about land ownership, industrial pollution, urban sprawl, and deforestation continue to threaten wetland integrity in Peru. The complete Pucchun Lagoon in Arequipa, 50 km^{2}, has been dried out for agricultural purposes. The Villa Swamp, located south of Lima, was reduced from its original 50 to 3 km^{2} in 1989 due to urban sprawl.

== Legal and institutional framework ==
=== Legal framework ===
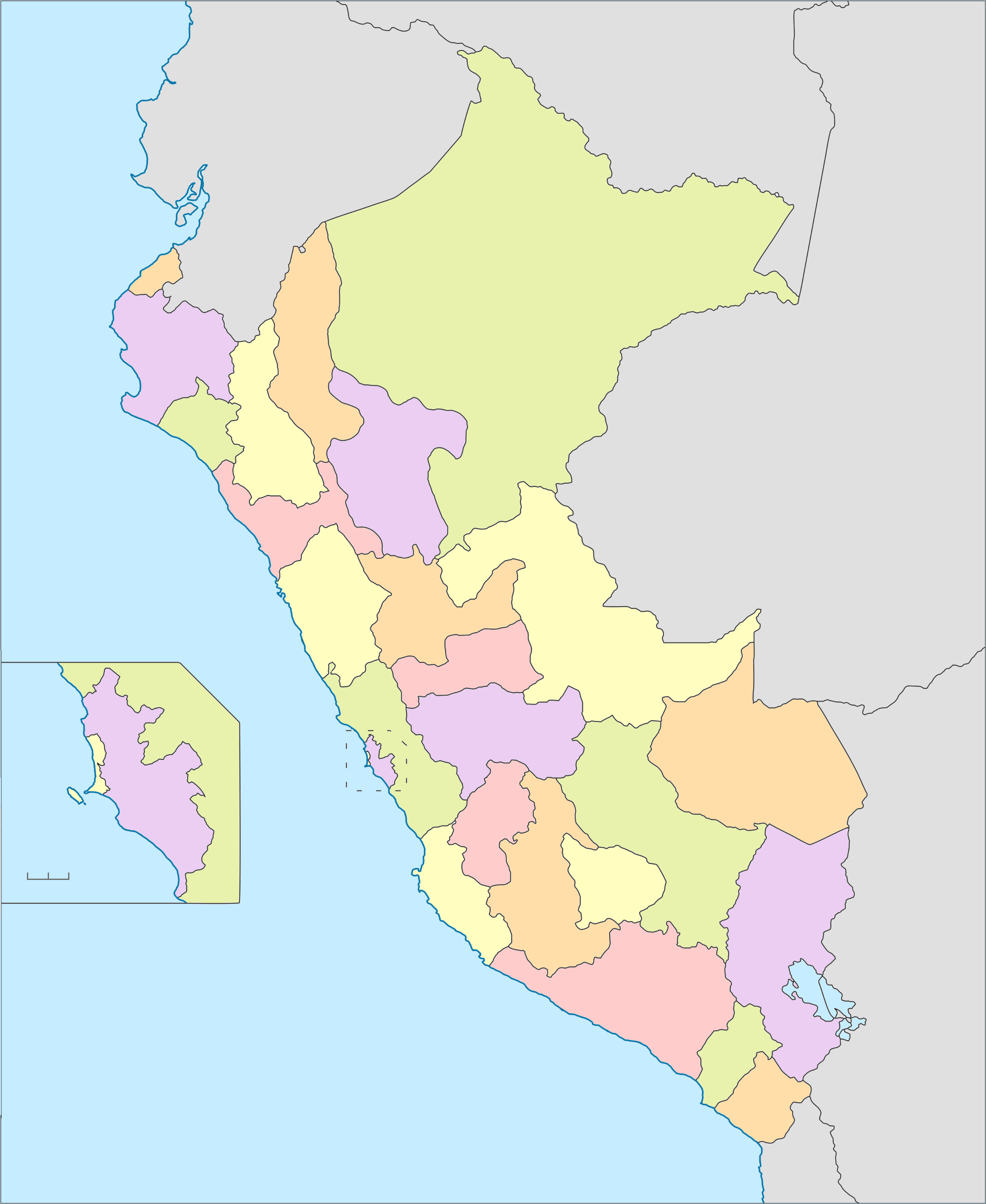
Clickable map of the regions of Peru.

The newly approved Water Law (Ley de Recursos Hídricos – LRH, published March 31, 2009) has enhanced the National Water Resources System (substituting Decree No. 1081) which now consist of ANA, a National Water Resources Court, River Basin Councils, regional and local governments and water users organizations. However, some institutions foreseen under the law, such as the River Basin Councils, remain to be created. The water law also establishes priority uses of water, re-defines water user rights, understands water as an economic good, defines sanctions, considers river basins as management units and incorporates groundwater management considerations. It is foreseen that subsidiary legislation (reglamentos) will complement the water law by specifying, for instance, the roles of each institution within the National Water Resources System.

The water law has been criticized by the Peruvian Peasant's Association claiming that it allows the privatization of water resources, does not involve local and regional governments in decision-making, promotes private operators in drinking water supply who would control water resources. They also claim that the interests of mining companies, industries and export-oriented agriculture influenced the drafting of the law.

Ley de Recursos Hídricos indeed gives a strong role to the national water authority ANA. Its 14 local branches, called Autoridades Administrativas del Agua, are accountable to the national authority and not to local or regional governments. The River Basin Councils (Consejos de Recursos Hídricos de Cuenca) are to be chaired by the president of the regional government, but they have only limited powers and their financial resources consist merely in a share of expected water abstraction fees that the National Water Agency would grant them.

=== Institutional organization ===
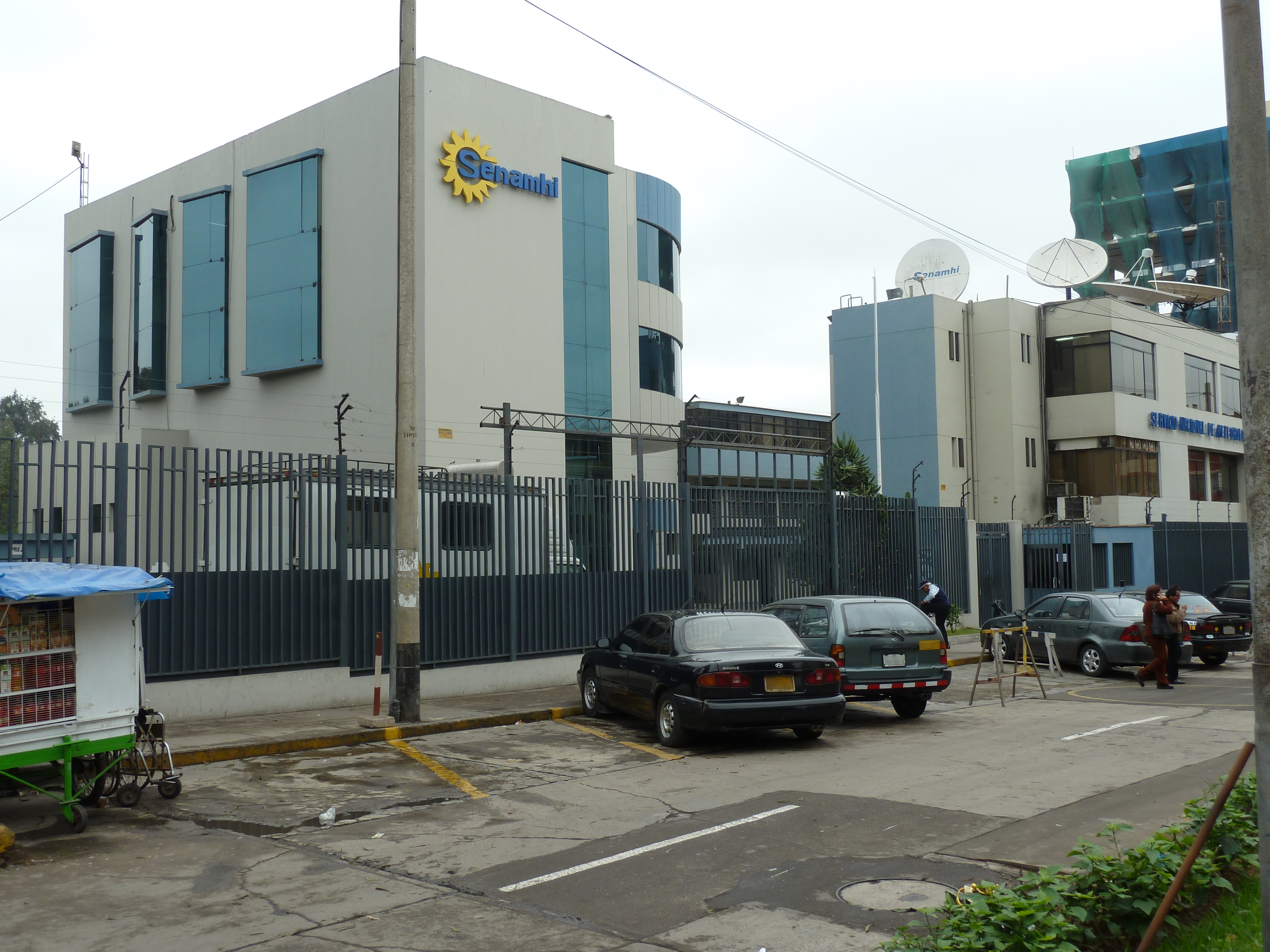
SENAMHI is responsible for the generation of hydro-meteorological information

The institutional framework for water resources management at national and river basin level is fragmented. The newly created National Water Authority (Autoridad Nacional del Agua – ANA) was established in December 2006 replacing the Water Resources Intendancy (Intendencia de Recursos Hídricos – IRH) and is responsible for the design and implementation of sustainable water resources policies and irrigation nationally. The creation of ANA improves the prospects for sound WRM, because it has a clear mandate for integrated, participative, basin-scale WRM, enjoys financial and administrative autonomy, is able to issue sanctions and will have local offices in river basins. Some of the modifications included are (i) ANA is the new water authority, however, it is still under the Ministry of Agriculture, which could hinder the impartiality required for sound WRM; (ii) ANA will have River Basin Authorities (Autoridades Administrativas del Agua—AAA), in each of Peru's 14 hydrographic regions and Local Water Authorities (Autoridades Locales de Agua—ALA) in selected river basins; and (iii) ANA is now also responsible for water quality.

However, a number of ministries have sectoral inputs on water resources management: Agriculture for Irrigation, Housing and Sanitation for domestic water use, Trade and Tourism for hot springs and mineral water, Energy and Mining for hydropower and mining operations, and the Council of Ministries for environmental policy and energy and water tariff and services regulation. In addition, the Ministry of Environment (MINAM) created in 2008 is responsible, among others, for the generation of hydro-meteorological information through its Meteorological and Hydrological National Service (Servicio Nacional de Meteorología e Hidrologia – SENAMHI).

The regional governments are responsible for the operation and maintenance (O&M) of major public hydraulic infrastructure (i.e., headwork such as dams and inter-basin transfers transferred to them as part of the decentralization process) and have some responsibilities for water quality. The regional government responsibilities poses a challenge for IWRM, since the administrative boundaries of the region do not coincide with those of the river basins. An additional challenge is that the regions are young and lack fundamental technical capacity and human resources to undertake IWRM.

Finally, the roles of other actors traditionally involved in WRM at the local level—some of them yet to be defined in the new institutionality—include (i) eight local offices of the Environmental Health General Department (Direccion General de Salud Ambiental—DIGESA), and (ii) Water User Boards (WUBs) responsible for operation and maintenance (O&M) of minor irrigation infrastructure.

=== Government strategy ===
In 2004, the Peruvian government proposed a National Water Resources Management Strategy, which is currently being discussed and is pending approval. The main objectives are:

- Institutional renovation and a clear legal framework to include (i) a resolution of current disparities between the Water Law and the Natural Resources Law, and transfer of irrigation system operation and maintenance to River Basin Authorities, promoting public participation in decision-making processes; and (ii) institutional development strategies that formalize water and pollution rights and establish a comprehensive tariff system to cover O&M activities.
- Integrated Management of Water Resources addressing both water supply and demand, taking into consideration environmental, social and economic factors. It includes a plan to modernize Peru's existing irrigation infrastructure with the goal of increasing the overall efficiency of irrigation systems from 35% to 45–50%.
- Increased Quality of Water Resources with a conservation initiative for upstream water resources aimed at decreasing sedimentation; it creates a pollution control authority to monitor agricultural and industrial discharges, promotes water recycling, and improves coastal drainage and salinity problems.
- Disaster Management and Mitigation including consistent weather monitoring, reforestation in strategic upstream areas, water channelling, and improved urban planning preventing settlements in high-risk areas.
- Capacity Building and Water Culture, and education program for preschool to college level students about the economic, social, and environmental value of water resources.
- Water Resources Information System strengthening of networks that monitor water quality and quantity; making accurate information publicly available. (See National Water Resources Management Strategy)

=== International agreements ===
The Amazon Cooperation Treaty, signed in 1978 by Bolivia, Brazil, Colombia, Ecuador, Guyana, Peru, Suriname and Venezuela, aims at promoting sustainable use of natural resources, including water, in the Amazon Basin

On 25 June 2005, after the approval of a US$700,000 grant by the Global Environment Fund the Amazon Cooperation Treaty Organization, the General Secretariat of the Organization of American States and the United Nations Development Program agreed to sign the Integrated and Sustainable Management of Transboundary Water Resources in the Amazon River Basin Considering Climate Variability and Change Project. The project aims to strengthen the institutional framework for planning and executing, in a coordinated and coherent manner, activities for the protection and sustainable management of water resources in the Amazon Basin in the face of impacts caused by human action and ongoing climatic changes being experienced in the Basin.

== Water pricing ==
Water pricing in Peru follows a complex system set out in the water law of 2009, which defines three types of fees and two types of tariffs: (i) fees paid for water abstraction from the environment (Retribuciones economicas por el uso del agua); (ii) fees paid for wastewater discharge to the environment (Retribuciones económicas por vertimiento de uso de agua residual tratada); (iii) tariffs for the use of water infrastructure; (iv) tariffs for water monitoring; and (v) tariffs for sectoral water distribution.

Tariffs for water distribution include irrigation tariffs and drinking water tariffs. These are historically the most important types of tariffs. Drinking water tariffs levied by utilities are approved by the national superintendency for water supply and sanitation, SUNASS. Tariffs are low compared to some neighboring countries, such as Brazil and Chile. Water bills are often not paid. (See water supply and sanitation in Peru). Irrigation tariffs are collected by water user boards. Water is rarely metered and therefore fees are mostly based on area and crop types rather than on volume of water used. Tariffs vary between US$2.2 per ha and US$25.55 per ha, and collection rates vary from 10% in the Amazon and 68% in the Costa region. Farmers contribute in cash through payment of the water tariff and in kind, through labor and materials, following ancestral practices.(See Irrigation in Peru)

All other fees and tariffs have to be approved by the National Water Agency as well as, in the case of abstraction and discharge fees, by the Ministry of Agriculture. The proceeds are to be used for environmental monitoring, prevention, control and remediation; water resources planning; and the operation and maintenance of infrastructure. The level of fees is to be differentiated depending on the type of use, taking into account social, economic and environmental factors. As of 2010, these new fees and tariffs were not yet being collected pending the setting of these fees through subsidiary legislation.

== Water related risks ==
The Peruvian piedmont and coastline are prone to devastating floods and mudslides, mainly due to heavy precipitation on degraded upper basins, whereas the southern part of the country is particularly prone to droughts. Aside from natural causes, such as El Niño Southern Oscillation, the effects of droughts and floods have been exacerbated by manmade interventions including soil erosion stemming from poor cropping and grazing practices, deforestation, and poor land use-practices. El Niño hits Peru approximately once every seven years and consists of heavy winds and rainfall associated with devastating floods and landslides. In 1997–1998 the costs of damages reached US$2 billion. Droughts severely affect the southern coast, producing agricultural losses as well as limitations on human water consumption. Preventive laws and measures (related to zoning, deforestation, and so forth) are not enforced and there is no reliable early warning system. The consequence is increasing negative impacts from droughts and floods on the different regions, with an increasing impact on Peru's economy.

== Potential climate change effects ==
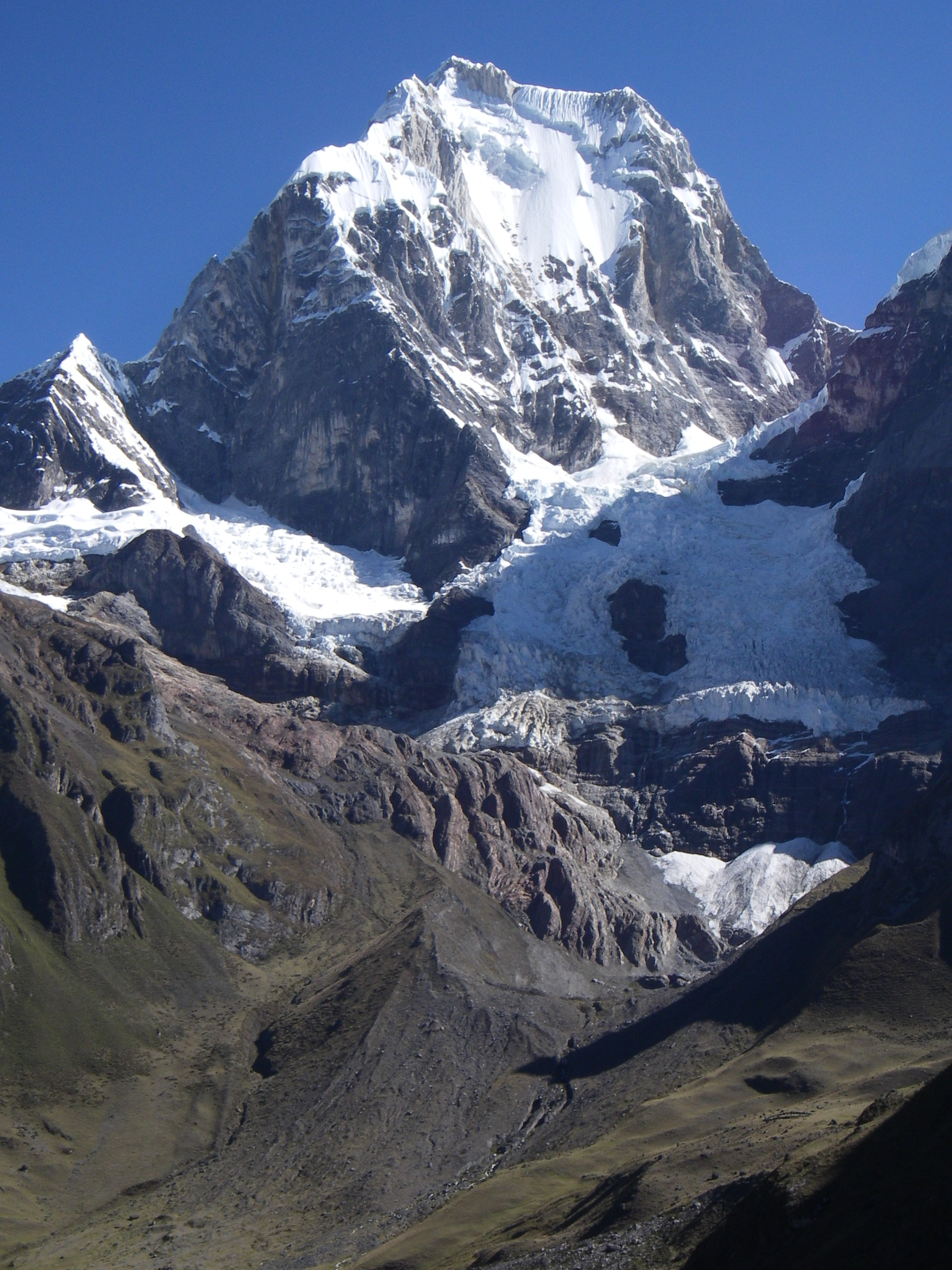
Yerupaja

Although a thorough assessment of the net impacts on Peru's water resources is still lacking, some trends are discernible. The effects of climate change in Peru include more extreme weather conditions such as droughts and floods, El Niño Southern Oscillation, increased likelihood of flash fires, changes in the ability of ecosystems to store water, and the retreat of Andean glaciers. The effects of glacier retreat are different at the initial and final stages of glacier retreat—initially more water is available during the dry season, while flow declines below the initial level once the glacier has melted. (See Impacts of Glacier Retreat in the Andes:Documentary). High mountain ecosystems, including páramos (unique wetlands of the Northern Andes) and snowcapped terrains are among the environments most sensitive to climate change. These ecosystems have unique endemic flora and provide numerous valuable environmental goods and services. Data recently made available suggest that climate impacts have already altered the circulation patterns responsible for producing and moving water vapor to the region. These changes have likely contributed to the disappearance of high-altitude water bodies, as well as to the increased occurrence of natural and human-induced mountain fires.

The Program for Strengthening of National Capacities to Manage the Impact of Climate Change and Air Pollution (PROCLIM) together with the Ministry of Environment and the Netherlands Cooperation Agency published a model for adaptation that estimated the impacts of climate change climate for several river basins. For instance, in the Mantaro River Basin one scenario presents a possible increase (greater than 50%) in precipitation along the entire basin, particularly over the west central mountain range and the Chinchaycocha plateau. According to a second scenario, precipitations in the west central range could increase in more than 100% while in the eastern region they could be reduced by 20%. In the Piura River Basin there is a (i) tendency towards increase of the minimum temperature peaks and the average sea level; (ii) greater probability that the intensity of future El Nino Events will increase; (iii) there will be an occurrence of an El Nino Phenomena during the 2009–2015 period similar to the one of 1982–1983; (iv) a deficit in the balance of water is foreseen during the period 2005–2035; and (v) tendency towards lengthier and more frequent drought periods is noticeable. In the Cordillera Blanca, Santa River Basin precipitations will become the main water resource in view of the severe retreat of the area's tropical glaciers. Because of the tendencies towards temperature increase, it is expected that the runoff levels will increase until they reach a peak in the first half of the century, to then exhibit a sustained decline in water resources.

== Public perceptions related to water and climate change ==
According to a 2008 survey of Radio RPP, only 37% of respondents think that water is scarce in Peru. Only 27% of respondents living in Lima—a city in the middle of a desert—believe water to be scarce in Lima. 72% of respondents throughout the country believe that Peru is affected by climate change. However, only 8% of respondents think that water scarcity is a consequence of Climate Change.

== Ongoing programs and initiatives ==
The government is currently looking into seawater desalination as a national priority to adapting to decreasing water availability. Peru's Government in planning a US$1.5 billion investment to build two desalination plants on Lima's coast to supply water to 1.5 million people.

The World Bank is collaborating with the Government of Peru through the National Water Resources Management Modernization Project (US$10 million). This project aims at strengthening the institutional capacity for integrated water resources management at the national level and in three river basins namely, Chancay-Lambayeque, Ica-Alto Pampas and Chili. The World Bank is also contributing US$85 million, out of a total of US$172.4 million, to a Subsectoral Irrigation Project (Programa Subsectorial de Irrigacion). Also, the Agricultural Research and Extension Adaptable Program Loan Phase 2 (US$69 million) aims to promote the adoption of sustainable agricultural practices in glacier-dependent watersheds.

In June 2007, the Global Environmental Facility approved the Regional Adaptation to the Impacts of Rapid Glacier Retreat in the Tropical Andes (Bolivia, Ecuador and Peru) Project. This project aims at implementing adaptation measures to meet the anticipated consequences of glacier retreat induced by climate change.

The Inter-American Development Bank (IDB) contributes US$10 million to a Water Resources Management Modernization Project focused on three pilot river basins namely, Santa, Chira-Piura and Tacna. This project does not include any intervention at the national level. In June 2007, the IDB approved US$200 million for a Water Resources Reform Program (WRRP) that would include hydraulic structures, and institutional and legal reforms. In August 2007, the IDB approved an additional US$5 million to support capacity building efforts contained in the WRRP. The IDB is also implementing a water resources management plan for Peru's Maschón and Chonta watersheds. The objective of this US$1.2 million grant is to define the appropriate measures for improving integrated water resources management.

== See also ==
- Electricity sector in Peru
- Irrigation in Peru
- Water supply and sanitation in Peru
- Water pollution in Peru
- Impacts of Glacier Retreat in the Andes:Documentary
