= Irrigation in Peru =

- Land area: 1,285,216 km^{2}
- Agricultural land: 17%
- Cultivated area equipped for irrigation: 27.7%
- Irrigated area: 12,000 km^{2}
- Systems: Surface irrigation: 11,000 km^{2}; Sprinkler irrigation: 1,200 km^{2}; Localized irrigation: 700 km^{2}
- Efficiency: 35%
- Water sources for irrigation: Surface water
- Tariff: 2.2–25.6 USD/ha

Water resources and irrigation infrastructure in Peru vary throughout the country. The coastal region, an arid but fertile land, has about two-thirds of Peru's irrigation infrastructure due to private and public investment aimed at increasing agricultural exports. The Highlands and Amazon regions, with abundant water resources but rudimentary irrigation systems, are home to the majority of Peru's poor, many of whom rely on subsistence or small-scale farming.

The Peruvian Government is undertaking several programs aimed at addressing key challenges in the irrigation sector like increasing water stress, competing interests, deteriorating water quality, poor efficiency of irrigation, drainage systems (including low technology systems and underutilization of existing infrastructure), weak institutional and legal frameworks, low cost recovery (i.e., operation and maintenance costs above actual collections), and vulnerability to climate variability and change, including extreme weather conditions and glacier retreat.

== History of the irrigation sector ==
=== Agricultural land under irrigation/past and present trends ===
Agriculture in Peru dates back more than 5,000 years when the Chavin culture built simple irrigation systems and canal networks north of Lima. By the 15th and 16th centuries, the Inca Empire boasted an advanced irrigation systems, supplying water to 700,000 hectares of diverse crops in the fertile coastal zone. For the next 300 years, Spanish colonialists shifted the country's focus to mining, which caused a reduction in agricultural production to 300,000 hectares in the coast.

The 20th Century represented a period of agricultural stagnation especially during the 1970s and 1980s. In the past 30 years, the Peruvian Government has invested about US$5 billion to improve hydraulic infrastructure, including dams, and irrigation and drainage systems, producing an increase of the land under irrigation mostly in the coastal region.

Today, approximately 1.7 million hectares of Peru's cultivated hectares have some irrigation infrastructure available. However, only 1.2 million hectares are actually irrigated each year due to poor performance of irrigation systems.

=== Institutional development ===
The 20th century began with an important institutional development in Peru's irrigation sector with the creation of the Mining and Water Engineering Body (1904) and the Hydrological Service (1911). However, it was not until the 1920s that the first large-scale State irrigation projects were launched. Public investment in irrigation in 1905 accounted for 8.7% of the total, reaching 18.62% in 1912, a trend that continued in the 1920s and 1930s.

From 1945 to 1948, the Government approved a National Plan for Improving Irrigation. Between 1945 and 1956, public investment reached unprecedented levels with up to 50% of total investment. Examples of the projects implemented at this time and during the 1960s are the water transfers from the Quinoz River to the intermittent Piura River in the Piura Region and from the Chotano River to Chancay-Lambayeque River in the Lambayeque Region, both located in the northern part of the coastal plain. Between 1950 and 1980, 90% of irrigation investment was directed to the coastal region and only 10% to the highlands.

The 1969 agrarian reform expropriated all estates above a certain size, usually 100 hectares. Most Peruvian peasants were independent smallholders and thus continued to farm their land individually after the reforms. The agrarian reform and political instability contributed to the poor performance of agriculture, since they profoundly changed the relationships of production in the countryside, disrupted the organization of productive systems on the best agricultural lands, and forced out part of the entrepreneurial capacity. The agrarian reform and the General Water Law (1969) made the existing informal water users organizations official and part of an organizational model promoted by the state. In 1989, the decree 037-89-AG (Decreto Supremo) decentralized operational, maintenance, and management of irrigation systems to water user boards (Juntas de Usuarios-WUBs). The decree aimed to incorporate private investment and spur independence and financial sustainability within water user organizations by establishing water tariffs to cover operational and maintenance costs (O&M). However, low tariffs and collection capacity produced insufficient financial support for WUBs to maintain and develop irrigation systems. The Peruvian Government continued to be the major actor in irrigation development which focused on the coastal region. Some 76% of investment in the coastal region between 1978 and 1982 was concentrated in three major irrigation projects at Majes (Arequipa Region), Chira-Piura (Piura Region) and Tinajones (Lambayeque Region). This trend was maintained in the 1990s.

In 1996 the government created the Subsectoral Irrigation Program (Programa Subsectorial de Irrigacion – PSI), aiming to develop some WUBs' capacities, reduce the role of the public sector in irrigation, improve sustainability through increased cost recovery, and increase investment in technical improvement of irrigation systems. The project, considered a big success, expanded to all WUBs in the Costa and is in the process of being expanded to the Sierra.

== Relevance of irrigation for agriculture and rural development ==
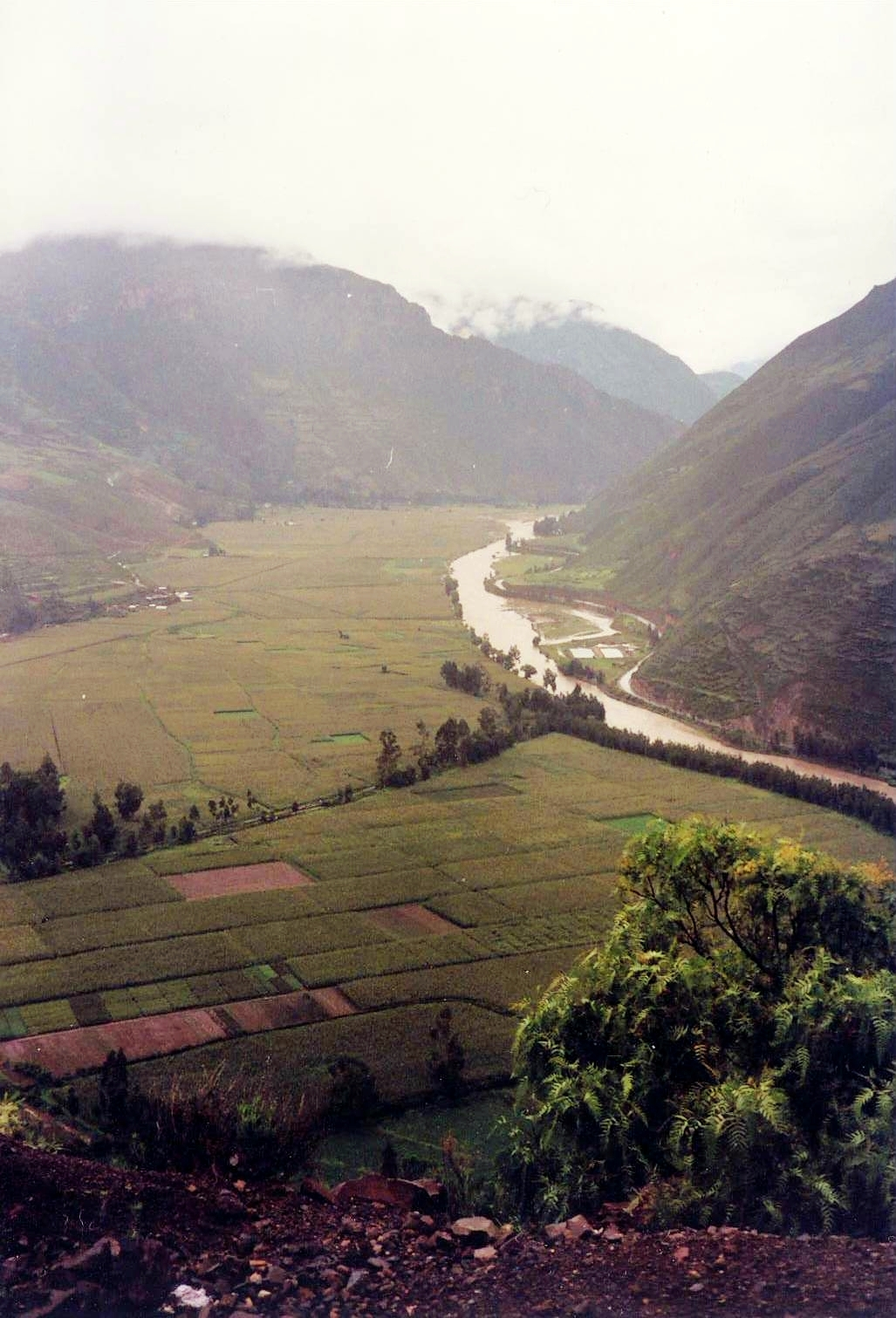
Irrigation on the Urubamba River (December 1999)

According to The Economist, Peru is South America's fastest-growing economy. That performance owes much to record prices for mineral exports. However, newer export products, such as mangoes and artichokes, are also flourishing. Irrigated agriculture has become increasingly important in Peru's development and growth, especially after a period of stagnation and limited development in the 1970s and 1980s. The agriculture sector employs 30% of Peru's population and accounts for 13% of GDP and more than 10% of total exports (US$1.6 billion in 2005).. Two-thirds of agricultural GDP is produced on the Pacific coastal strip, a region totally dependent on irrigation due to low rainfall. High-value crops and irrigation technology have had a major impact on the coast's rural development. In 2001, rural poverty in the region was 5.2%. Poverty has fallen only slowly in the Andean region, where poverty reaches 70 percent of the population. Many Andean Indigenous remain trapped in subsistence farming on small plots and rudimentary irrigation systems. The region produces only one-third of the country's agricultural GDP.

Irrigation plays a fundamental role in increasing agricultural production and diversification, rural employment, and food security. President Alan Garcia has set an ambitious target of cutting poverty to 30 percent by the end of his term, in 2011. For the first time in three decades the state has money to invest and —with the help of the World Bank-the government has drawn up a new anti-poverty strategy which includes ramping up social spending and agricultural development while trying to target more closely on the poorest areas, most of them in the southern Andes.

Rural and Urban Poverty by Natural Regions in Peru (%)

Poverty	Urban	Rural	Costa	Sierra	Selva	Total
Extreme Poverty	9.9	51.3	5.8	45.6	39.7	24.4
Poverty	32.1	27.1	33.5	26.4	29.0	30.4
Total Poverty	42.0	78.4	39.3	72.0	68.7	54.8
Total	65.0	35.0	51.3	35.5	13.2	100.0

Source: INEI 2001

== Irrigation development ==
=== Irrigation infrastructure ===
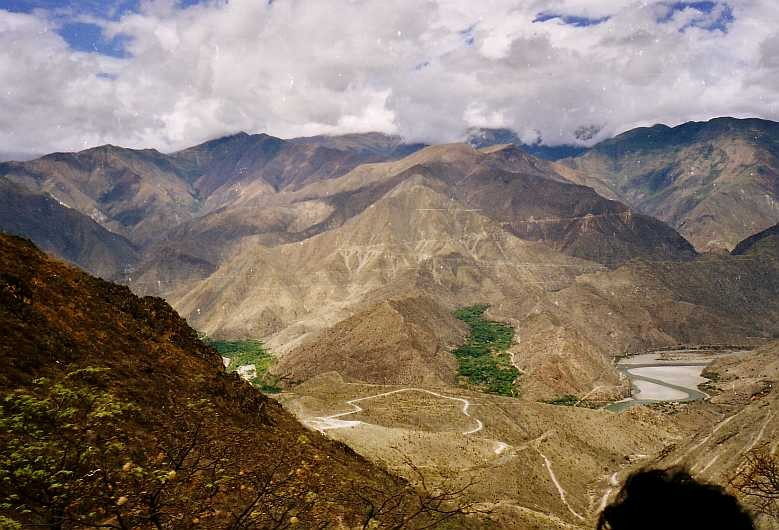
Irrigation in the Marañón Valley between Chachapoyas (Amazonas Region) and Celendín in Northern Peru

Peru's agricultural land is only 4.3% of its territory, with 5.5 million ha in use, of which 3.75 million ha is under rainfed agriculture and 1.75 million ha with irrigation infrastructure. The following chart reflects irrigation infrastructure allocation in Peru.

Area with Irrigation Infrastructure and irrigated areas (In thousands of hectares)

Region	Infrastructure (a)	%	Irrigated (b)	%	(b/a)
Costa	1,190	68	736	66	61
Sierra	453	26	289	26	63
Selva	109	6	84	8	77
Total	1,752	100	1,109	100	

Source: Portal Agrario (1994)

About 80% of all water withdrawal in Peru is used for irrigation, yet much of this water (65%) is lost due to reliance on inefficient irrigation systems. Overall efficiency of water use in irrigation systems is estimated at 35%, which is considered poor performance and is due mainly to leaky distribution systems and the wide use of unimproved gravity and flooding irrigation methods with an overall estimated efficiency of 50%.

Water is rarely metered and fees are mostly based on hectarage rather than on the volume of water used. Inadequate irrigation management together with inefficient irrigation systems lead to pervasive irrigation practices, with farmers applying water in excess of crop requirements and water availability.

The coastal region, due to climatic conditions, depends on the water supplied by rivers (surface water) of the Andean Chain channeled through irrigation systems. In 1997, surface water supplied 97% of the fields by gravity irrigation (822473 ha) and 3% by pressurized irrigation (19680 ha). In the Costa landholdings are relatively large and agriculture is mostly commercialized and devoted to exports.

In the Sierra and Selva, with 97% of Peru's water availability, surface water supplies agricultural fields by furrow irrigation. Irrigation systems consist of an open canal network, generally unlined, with rudimentary water intakes and distribution systems supplying small plots devoted mostly to subsistence agriculture. Less than 5% of irrigated land is equipped with improved on-farm irrigation systems.

=== Linkages with water resources ===
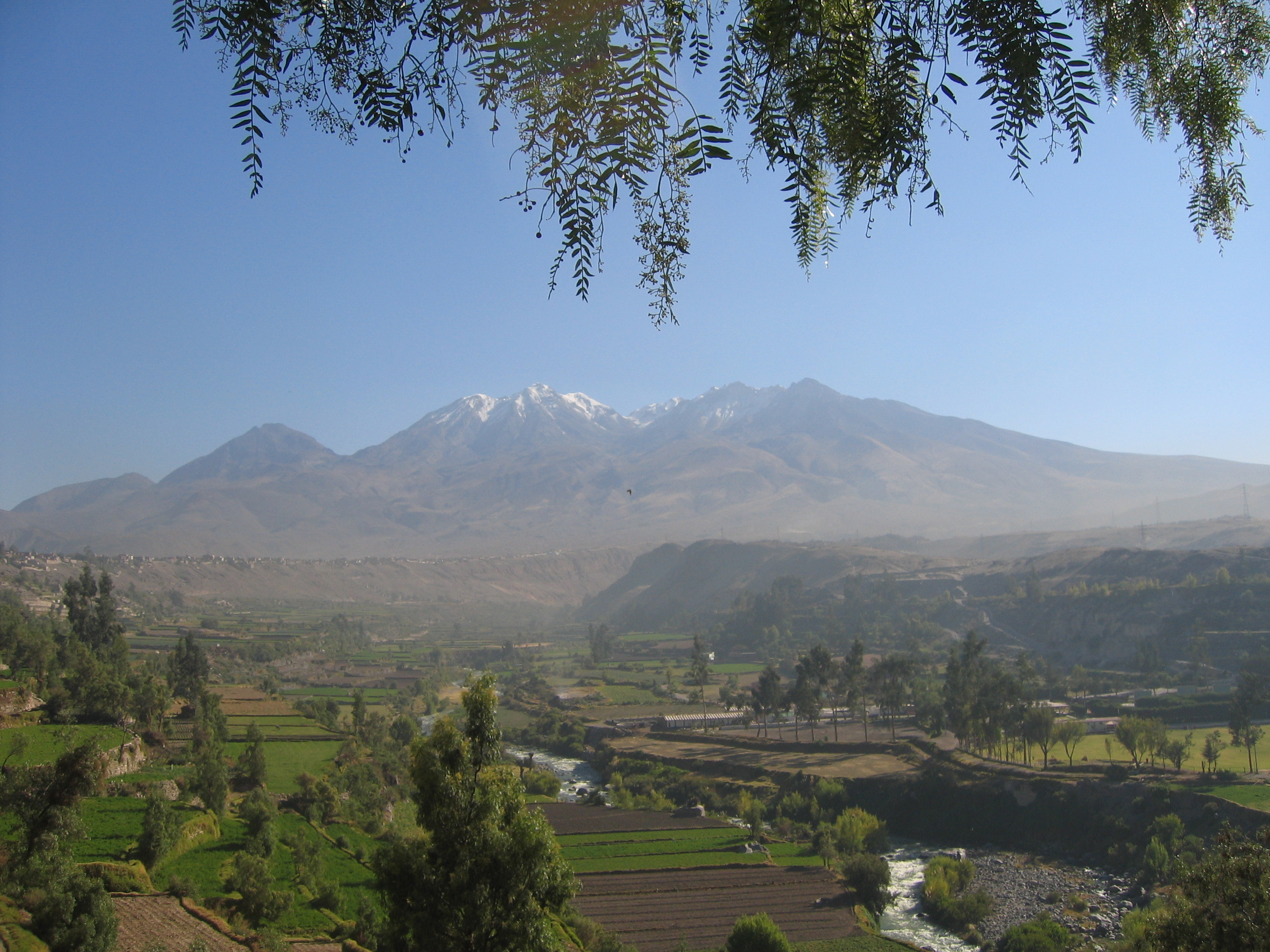
Irrigation in the Chili Valley in the Arequipa Region

Peru has a high availability of water resources with about 106 river basins, and a per capita availability of 77,600 m3—the highest in Latin America. The Andes divide Peru into three natural drainage basins: (i) Pacific basin, with 53 rivers, (ii) Atlantic basin, with 32 rivers, and (iii) Titicaca basin, with 13 rivers.

The dry Pacific basin, with 37 million cubic meters (m3) available per year, contains just 1.8% of Peru's water resources. Some 53 rivers, flowing west from the Andes to the coast, supply the bulk of the water used for irrigation. Of these rivers, only about 30% are perennial. Year-round irrigation water supply for about 40% of the irrigated area is unreliable, without some form of regulatory storage. The Atlantic basin holds 97% of all available water and receives almost 2 billion cubic meters annually. The Lake Titicaca area receives 10 million cubic meters annually. The majority of the rainfall occurs between November and May; the rest of the year irrigation depends on low-tech systems.

River Basin	Surface Area (1000 km2)	Water Availability (Annual thousand m3)	Water Availability (m3 per capita/year)	Number of Rivers
Pacific	279.7	37,363.0	2,027.0	53.0
Atlantic	958.5	1,998,405.0	291,703.0	32.0
Titicaca	47.0	10,172.0	9,715.0	13.0
Total	1285.2	245,940.0	77,534.0	98.0

Source: INEI (2007)

=== Environmental impacts of irrigation ===
Environmental effects of irrigation concern:

- in the irrigation project: waterlogging, soil salination, pollution of drainage water, loss of natural habitats of flora and fauna
- downstream of the project: reduced surface water availability, increased groundwater inflow, water logging, polluted incoming water
- see also: Environmental impact of irrigation

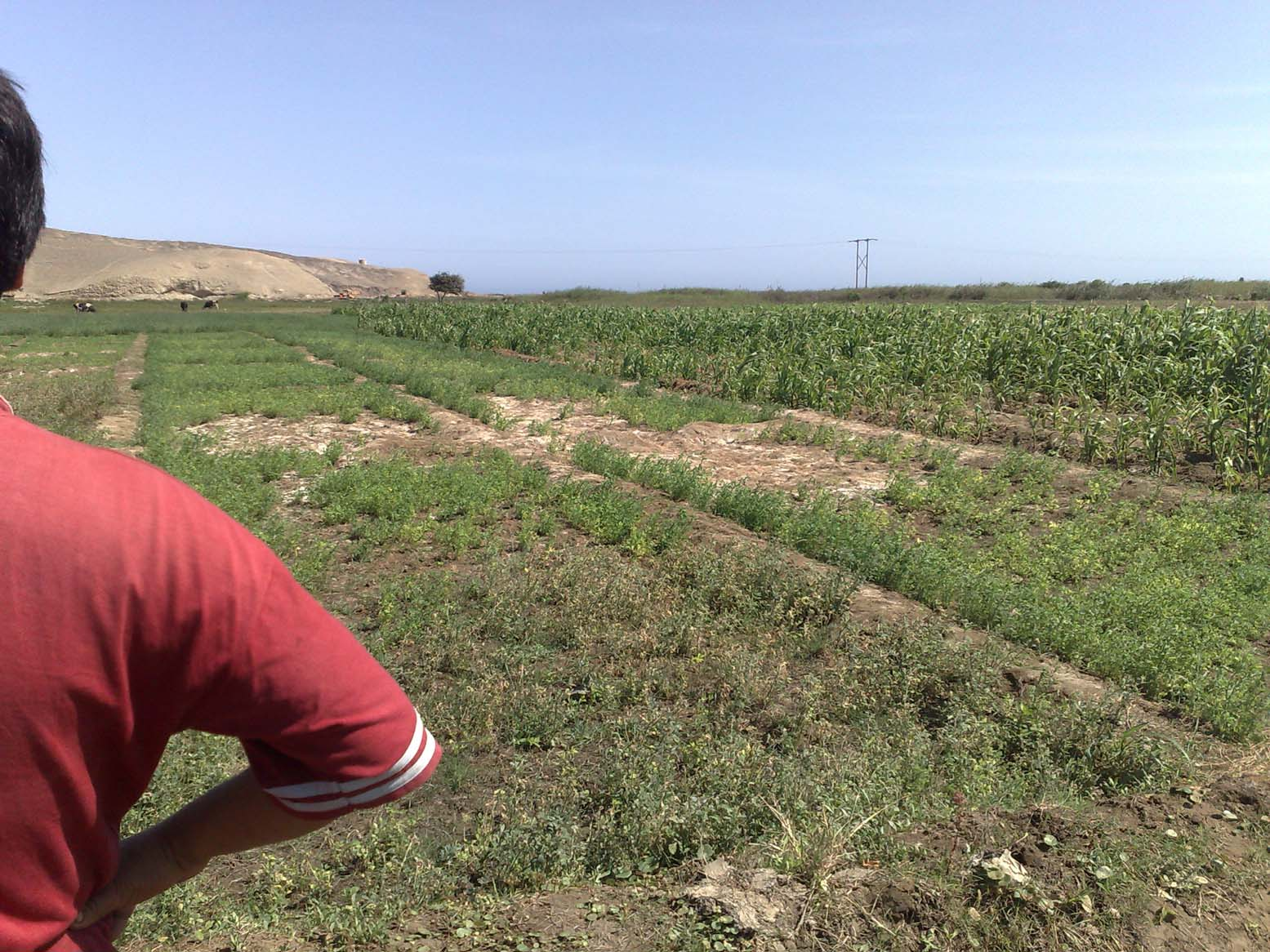
Looking over the shoulder of a tail-end farmer in Huarmey delta at irrigated saline land with poor crop stand.

The environmental effects often impoverish tail-end farmers.

Loss of habitat, water pollution and downstream effects have been scarcely looked at, because insufficient economic resources have limited the involvement of institutions responsible for environmental preservation.

The most encompassing survey of soil salinity problems was realized in the period of 1971 to 1975 by ONERN with collaboration of CENDRET, later SUDRET.

The following table shows irrigation developments, cultivated and degraded areas in particular years from 1964 to 2000 in the coastal zone. It shows the fast development of irrigation water resources and irrigable land, the lagging behind of the actually cultivated land and the fast increase of degraded land. Up to 1984 there was also a considerable increase of the amount of water applied per ha of irrigated land that shows the possibility of using excessive irrigation.

Year	Irrigable area (ha)	Irrigated area^{1)} (ha)	Irrigation water used (MCM)	Irrigation water used (m^{3}/ha)	Degraded area^{2)} (ha)
1964	500 000	580 000	8 000	13 800	150 000
1969	620 000	620 000	9000	14 500	200 000
1976	770 000	620 000	9700	15 200	225 000
1984	935 000	500 000	11 300	22 600	252 000
2000	1 050 000	660 000	14 300	21 700	296 000

^{1)} Including double cropping in a year ^{2)} due to waterlogging and salinity
Sources: (1) CENDRET, 1974 ”Evaluación de los problemas de drenaje y salinidad en la costa Peruana”, (2) IPROGA, 1988 ”Gestión del Agua y Crisis Institucional”, (3) INADE, 2002 “Plan de Gestión de la Oferta de Agua de los proyectos Hidráulicos de costa“.

Drainage problems are also affecting 150,000 hectares in the Selva.

Agricultural runoff, together with mining and industrial waste water, is also having an impact on water quality. Of the 53 rivers in the coastal area, 16 are partly polluted by lead, manganese and iron. Excessive deforestation in upper river basins due to nomadic agricultural practices is causing erosion problems in the Sierra, where 55-60% of the land is affected, and is increasing the amount of soil transported downstream.

== Legal and institutional framework ==
=== Legal framework ===
Peru's Constitutional framework establishes sole ownership and managerial responsibility of water resources by the national government. The government allows water use under special conditions and appropriate payment of a water tariff, while maintaining ownership and ultimate control.

The General Water Law 17752 (Ley General de Aguas, 1969) considers water as an agricultural commodity. The 1997 Natural Resources Law 26821 allows the transfer of water rights, including irrigation, from one party to another, which is incompatible with the General Water Law, and presents significant obstacles to the establishment and management of water property rights.

In 2003 the government approved a 10-year National Irrigation Strategy (Ministerial Resolution 0498-2003-AG) aims at improving irrigation and drainage system technologies by creating a framework for national, regional, and local cooperation in the planning and implementation of irrigation projects (see below). Also, the Technical Irrigation Program (Programa de Riego Tecnificado-PRT-Law 28585 and its Regulation DS 004-2006-AG), approved in 2006, aims to repair, develop, and improve irrigation systems throughout Peru.

A draft National Water Resources Management Initiative, currently under revision by the Agrarian Committee, (see Water resources management in Peru) will recognize water's multisectoral nature and modify the previous institutional and legal framework, including irrigation, to carry out integrated water resources management.

=== Institutional framework ===
The institutional reforms of the past decade reduced the technical tasks under the responsibility of the Ministry of Agriculture (MINAG) and created numerous semi-autonomous executive units and special programs at the national, regional, and local levels. PSI (Programa Subsectorial Irrigacion), is the institution carrying out the PSI programs aimed at improving the WUBs' managerial and technical capacities. The National Watershed Management and Conservation Soils Project (Programa Nacional de Manejo de Cuencas Hidrograficas y Conservacion del Suelo-PRONAMACHCS), promotes integrated water resources management and conservation in river basins, with emphasis on the highlands. The National Meteorological and Water Resources Service (Servicio Nacional de Meteorologia e Hidrologia-SENAMHI) studies and disclosures information regarding climate events and their impacts on water resources.

In 2008, Peru's government created a National Water Authority (Autoridad Nacional del Agua, ANA), under MINAG, replacing the Intendancy of Water Resources. ANA is responsible for designing and implementing sustainable water resources policies and irrigation nationally. ANA has local offices at each of Peru's 14 hydrographic regions, the Autoridades Administrativas del Agua (AAA); and Autoridad Local del Agua (ALA) at the local level—replacing the former Technical Administration of Irrigation Districts (Administración Técnica del Distrito de Riego, ATDR).

The national government continues to transfer duties to the regional and local governments, especially after the Decentralization Law and the 2003 law establishing regional governments. One of the newest responsibilities of these bodies consists of the implementation of the Technical Irrigation Program and the operation and maintenance (O&M) of major public hydraulic infrastructure (i.e. headwork such as dams and inter-basin transfers transferred to them as part of the decentralization process). Water User Boards (WUBs) responsible for operation and maintenance (O&M) of minor irrigation infrastructure. Finally, the newly approved Water Resources Law (Ley de Recursos Hídricos – LRH, published March 31, 2009) includes River Basin Councils (Consejos de Recursos Hidricos de las Cuencas, CC) as part of the National Water Resources System. The CCs will be in charge of elaborating River Basin Plans including allocation of water to different users and planning of new infrastructure which will impact irrigation.

=== Key Legal Issues that Arise in Irrigation PPPs ===
There are a number of legal and commercial issues that will affect how these projects move forward and are structured. Whilst some of the legal issues are not confined to irrigation PPPs they can take on a new dimension and complexity when applied to irrigation: Land ownership; water extraction; public sector counterpart. These will be key issues in a PPP as the private provider will want to ensure a steady revenue stream.

There are also the usual legal considerations that need to be checked when developing PPPs in any sector, such as legal restrictions on the type of PPP arrangement that can be entered into, relevant procurement rules for entering into PPPs, existence of restrictions on foreign investment, taxation and potential for tax holidays and the ability to assign rights such as security and step in rights to lenders.

=== Farmers/organizations and on-farm water management ===
There are 112 WUBs in Peru comprising about 1,500 Irrigation Commissions (Comisiones de Regantes–CIs). Most of the irrigation infrastructure in coastal areas is managed by 64 WUBs, comprising about 300,000 water users. WUBs are less developed in the Andes and the Amazon, where water for irrigation is managed by more traditional organizations, Irrigation Committees (Comites de Regantes).

WUBs are private, nonprofit, and collectively owned organizations responsible for the O&M of collective irrigation infrastructure and the administration of water tariffs in one particular irrigation district. WUBs consist of representatives of Irrigation Commissions (Comisiones de Regantes) and non-agricultural water users groups which are responsible for water distribution in their irrigation subsectors and must participate financially in the planning and maintenance of the collective irrigation infrastructure. WUBs elect a board of directors to administer financial resources and implement WUB agreements and dispositions.

WUBs face several challenges: (i) increased pressure of water resources due to competing demands, (ii) deteriorating irrigation infrastructure, (iii) lack of financial sustainability, (iv) lack of technical capacity to manage irrigation, and (v) ambiguous role of Juntas, Commission, and Committees among themselves and with the Government.

== National irrigation strategy ==
In 2003, the Peruvian Government approved a National Irrigation Strategy (Politicas y Estrategia Nacional de Riego en el Peru) Resolucion Ministerial N 0498-2003-AG. The strategy had been prepared by a multisectorial technical commission consisting of representatives from the Ministries of Agriculture; Housing, Construction and Sanitation; Economy and Finance; and the National Association of Users of Irrigation Districts.

The Strategy aims at increasing the profitability and competitiveness of irrigated agriculture through sustainable use of land and efficient water use. The strategy aims at increasing water use efficiency through the rehabilitation and modernization of irrigation infrastructure and the improvement of its O&M; promoting equitable and sustainable water use through the technical improvement of irrigation and drainage infrastructures; developing technically and financially self-sufficient WUBs responsible for the O&M of irrigation infrastructure; and enhancing farmer investment in irrigation infrastructure by regularizing water rights, taking into account water availability and water use efficiency. The ultimate goal is promoting an integrated water management system aimed at considering multisectoral use of water, river basin conservation, and disaster reduction.

== Economics ==
=== Water tariff and cost recovery ===
WUBs are in charge of collecting water tariffs. Only 50% of WUBs are financially and technically independent. The remaining WUBs are in the process or in need of assistance to achieve financial and technical sustainability. Tariffs fluctuate from US$20–30 per ha, and collection rates vary from 10% in the Amazon to 68% in the Costa region.

The majority (83%) of the tariff revenues fund WUB activities. The remaining returns are allocated to cover O&M costs (8%) and to support the regional water authority, ATDR (8%). In 2006, the Peruvian Government approved DS 054-2006-AG, by which 2% of the water tariff component aimed at funding WUBs (86% of the total tariff), will now fund the recently created Fondo Nacional de Agua (FONAGUA). FONAGUA, a multisectoral body, aims to promote integrated water use management in Peru.

=== Investment and financing ===
According to MINAG, the cost of minor and major irrigation infrastructure in Peru is 11% and 48% higher, respectively, than the world average. Decentralization, together with the development of water resources management and irrigation institutions, created a multitude of entities responsible for irrigation investments at the national, regional, and local levels. The National Government has been investing in major irrigation infrastructure, mostly located in the coastal region although it plans to extend its efforts to the highlands as well. According to 2000 data, the National Government invested US$3.468 million to develop irrigation schemes in ten coastal projects.

Minor irrigation infrastructure is financed by the National Government in collaboration with the beneficiaries through a cost-sharing system. Since the creation of the Technical Irrigation Program (under PSI), financially sustainable WUBs have improved 5,282 ha of irrigation infrastructure, benefiting 1,085 producers, by raising US$5.5 million of a US$13.6 million project. NGOs, Municipal Savings and Loan Banks, and Savings and Loan Cooperatives operating in almost all departments of the country are also providing products specifically designed to serve agricultural producers in Peru, including loans for agricultural micro-enterprises and irrigation improvement.

=== External cooperation ===
In 1997, the World Bank contributed US$85 million, out of a total of US$172.4 million, to a Subsectoral Irrigation Project (Proyecto Subsectorial de Irrigacion). The aims of the PSI were (i) increasing water use efficiency through the rehabilitation and modernization of irrigation infrastructure, (ii) institutional strengthening of selected WUBs, and (iii) improving technical irrigation systems. In 2005, the World Bank increased its involvement with PSI II, by investing US$10.26 million of a US$22 million project, aimed at extending improved irrigation systems and WUBs capacity building to all the coastal region. Currently the World Bank is collaborating with Peru's Government to extend PSI's technical and financial support to the Sierra.

In June 2007, the Inter-American Development Bank (IDB) approved US$200 million for a water resources reform program (WRRP) that would include irrigation structures and institutional and legal reform. In August 2007, the IDB approved an additional US$5 million to support capacity building efforts contained in the WRRP. The IDB is also implementing a water resources management plan for Peru's Maschón and Chonta watersheds. The objective of this US$1.2 million grant is to define the appropriate measures for improving integrated water resources management.

== Possible climate change impacts on irrigated agriculture ==
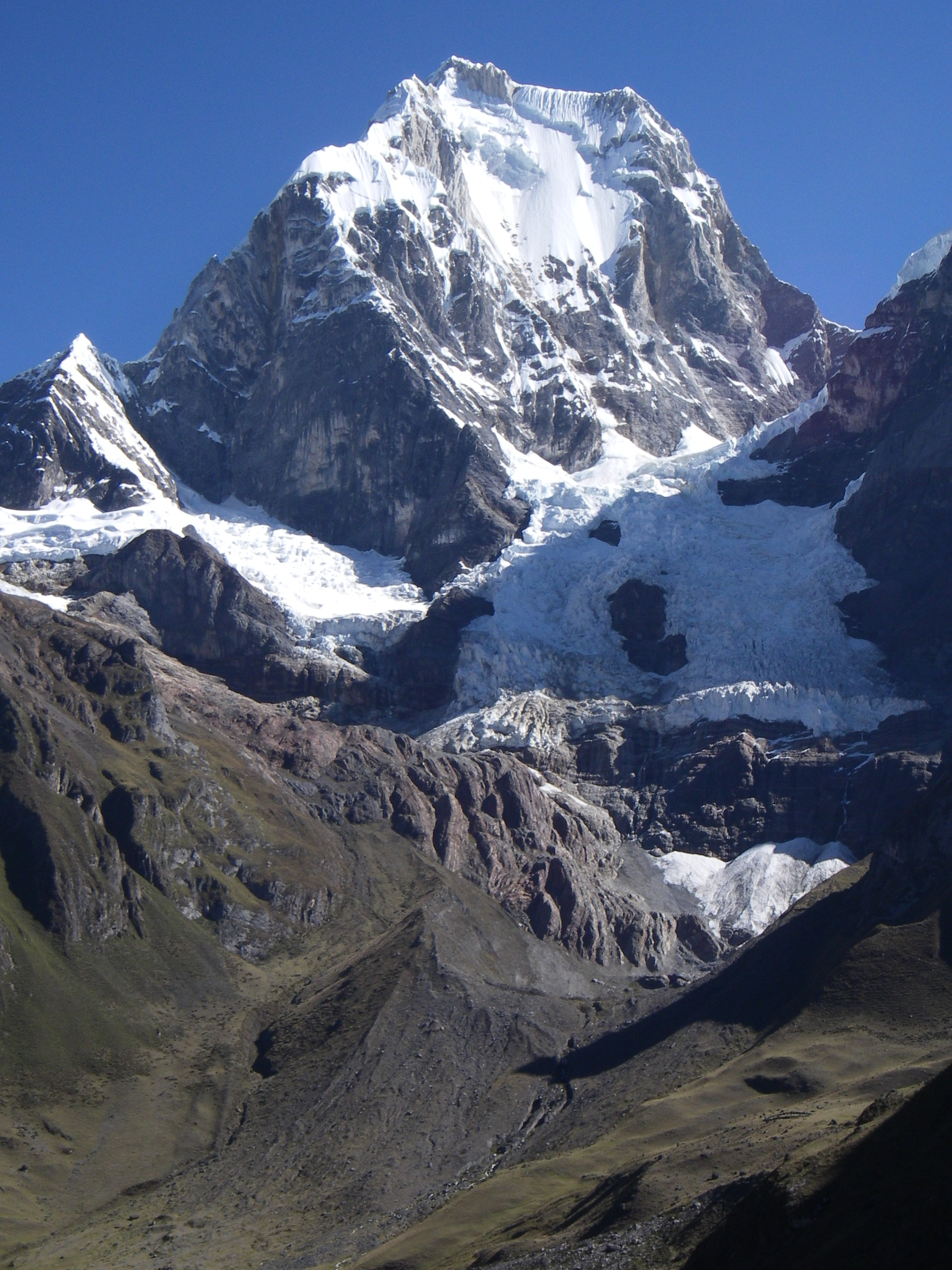
Yerupaja

The effects of climate change in Peru can be seen in more extreme weather conditions and El Niño Southern Oscillation causing droughts and floods, and the retreat of Andean glaciers. The combined impacts of global warming and extreme weather are likely to severely impact hydrology, decreasing the water flow available for irrigation downstream in the coastal region and altering crop productivity. The Andean Community (CAN) estimates that climate change will cause US$30,000 million in losses or 4,5% of the GDP annually starting in 2025.

El Niño hits Peru approximately every seven years, producing economic and environmental damages and loss of life. In 1997-1998 El Niño caused US$2 billion in damages. Climate change is increasing the severity of this and other storms, increasing the vulnerability of Peru's poor, and damaging low technology irrigation infrastructures and agricultural crops. In the mountains, deforestation and slash-and-burn agriculture increase erosion and the risk of landslides. These effects are felt both at their source and further downstream and include damage to crops, water resources, and irrigation.

Peru contains roughly 71% of the world's tropical glaciers. Some of Peru's perennial rivers are fed by glaciers that are rapidly disappearing due to climate change. Since 1980 Peruvian glaciers have lost 22% of their surface area (500 km2), equivalent to 7,000 million cubic meters of water (about ten years of water supply for Lima). Glacier retreat in the Andes has important repercussions on Peru's water resources, including irrigation production and hydropower generation. This trend will continue, and it is believed that the increased runoff will cause Peru to suffer from severe water stress over the next 20 years. Peru's water supply is predicted to then decrease dramatically between 2030 and 2050.

== Lessons learned from the Peruvian model ==
PSI (Proyecto Subsectorial de Irrigacion) is delivering positive results on the Peruvian coast, combining financial support and capacity building with regularization of water rights. The model's success in the coast has led to its current expansion in the Andean region.

Part of the success comes from the Government and WUBs sharing investment responsibilities for irrigation infrastructure improvements through a cost-sharing system. The cost sharing system encourages WUBs to increase tariffs and collection rates in order to raise a percentage of the total investment (15% for large investments and 35% for on-farm investments) which would then qualify for the Government to fund the rest of the project. Since its implementation, 63,730 producers belonging to 19 WUB have improved the irrigation infrastructure of 197,150 ha along the coast, contributing 14% of the total investment. WUBs have also technically improved 5,282 ha of irrigation infrastructure on the land benefiting 1,085 producers by raising US$5.5 million of the US$13.6 million.

Infrastructure rehabilitation and modernization is complemented by improving the management of irrigation schemes to ensure effective and sustainable use of irrigation systems. The capacity-building aspect of the Peruvian model includes strengthening the operation and maintenance requirements of the systems, and improvement of financial performance through increased volumetric metering, water tariff structure, and collection rate. Improving financial performance of the WUBs is linked to increasing farm incomes and therefore farmers' capacity to contribute to O&M costs as well as irrigation improvement investments.

In addition, MINAG began a Special Program for Land Titling (Proyecto Especial de Titulacion de Tierras y Catastro Rural-PETTCR) in 1992 to combat the uncertainty of property rights and the atomization of the agrarian structure. The implementation of PETTCR has increased the number of registered agricultural lands from 7% to 81% in 2005. PETTCR includes a proactive regularization of water rights based on water availability. Water security provided by formalized water rights is likely to encourage farmers to invest in their farming systems: for example, in improved on-farm irrigation technologies or conversion to higher value crops.

== Gender in Irrigation ==
In spite of their many functions, WUB have in many cases limited capacity. PSI carried out a study of their capacity during the first phase, in the coast, where the state of the art irrigation practices are found. The study established that only 65% of them have acceptable water management. As a result, PSI held training and capacity building programs and found that the majority of participants were male. However, women do most of the agriculture work in rural areas as a result of male migration to the cities. Nevertheless, their representation in WUB is limited. Furthermore, in the board, most times they hold non relevant positions or their presence is nominal.

The PSI encouraged women to participate and water management in trainings through some pilots held in the Highland municipalities of Cajamarca, Junín and Arequipa with the support of the World Bank (a US$30,000 donation from the Gender Action Plan). The pilots did a diagnosis on the audience; established the baseline, objectives, and indicators; developed a program for male and community sensitization; and obtained quantitative and qualitative results on women participation and leadership. For the future, PSI intends to mainstream all gender issues in projects, thus helping increase gender equity and therefore democracy in water management.

- There is a video on the pilots Here

== See also ==
- Water resources management in Peru
- Water supply and sanitation in Peru
- Electricity sector in Peru
