= Water supply and sanitation in Peru =

Data
- Access to an improved water source: 85%
- Access to improved sanitation: 71%
- Share of collected wastewater treated: 22% (2004)
- Continuity of supply: 71%
- Average urban water use (L/person/day): 259
- Average urban water and sanitation tariff (US$/m^{3}): 0.38
- Share of household metering: 50%
- Annual investment in WSS: US$6/capita
- Share of self-financing by utilities: very low
- Share of tax-financing: n/a
- Share of external financing: n/a

Institutions
- Decentralization to municipalities: Full, since 1990
- National water and sanitation company: None
- Water and sanitation regulator: Yes
- Responsibility for policy setting: Ministry of Housing, Construction and Sanitation
- Sector law: Yes (1994 and amended subsequently)
- No. of urban service providers: 50 companies and 490 municipalities
- No. of rural service providers: 11,800

The water and sanitation sector in Peru has made important advances in the last two decades, including the increase of water coverage from 30% to 85% between 1980 and 2010. Sanitation coverage has also increased from 9% to 37% from 1985 to 2010 in rural areas. Advances have also been achieved concerning the disinfection of drinking water and in sewage treatment. Nevertheless, many challenges remain, such as:

- Insufficient service coverage;
- Poor service quality which puts the population's health at risk;
- Deficient sustainability of built systems;
- Tariffs that do not cover the investment and operational costs, as well as the maintenance of services;
- Institutional and financial weakness; and,
- Excess of human resources, poorly qualified, and high staff turnover.

== Access ==
Access to water and sanitation increased during the last decades. Political efforts to increase access include the program Agua para todos which started in 2006 under President Alan García (see below).

=== Joint Monitoring Program ===
According to the Joint Monitoring Program (JMP) by WHO and UNICEF the coverage of improved drinking water service was 85% and 71% had access to improved sanitation in 2010. Access increased from 75% concerning water and 54% concerning sanitation in 1990. In 2010, urban coverage was 91% for water and 81% for sanitation. In rural areas coverage of drinking water was 65% and sanitation 37%.

Access to Water and Sanitation in Peru (2010)
		Urban (77% of the population)	Rural (23% of the population)	Total
Water	Total Improved	91%	65%	85%
Water	Piped on premises	83%	46%	74%
Sanitation	Improved sanitation	81%	37%	71%
Sanitation	Shared	9%	3%	8%
Sanitation	Open defecation	1%	28%	7%

=== National figures ===
According to the Peruvian National Statistics and Informatic Institute (Instituto Nacional de Estadística e Informática - INEI), about 73% of the population had access to drinking water supply in 2009, while about 57% had access to sewerage. In the framework of the development plan Plan Bicentenario it is envisaged to increase water supply coverage to 85% and access to sewerage to 79% by 2021.

=== Social access ===
Parts of Peru are located in vast deserts, limiting water accessibility. While there has been an emphasis within the country on improving infrastructure to increase water access and restore watersheds, much of Peru still remains under-served, with over 1.5 million people estimated to have no running water in their homes. A 2015 UN Water Global Analysis and Assessment of Sanitation and Drinking Water report stated that Peru has made significant improvements within the last fifteen years to promote sanitation and improve access to water. Water access, however, is still unequal; some Peruvians pay 1.3 sols (.40 USD) for one cubic meter of running water, while poorer citizens who rely on water delivery trucks to bring them their resources pay around 20 sols ($6 USD) for one cubic meter of running water, an over 1500% increase. Water delivered in Peru tends to be unsanitary and non-potable. However, wealthier citizens are more easily able to treat water in their homes, while poorer citizens often lack the resources to properly treat their water.

== Service quality ==
In a national survey conducted in 2008, 64% of respondents indicated that they were satisfied with the quality of the water they received. Those who were not satisfied complained about turbidity, high levels of chlorine, bad taste and bad smell. This figure apparently does not include the level of satisfaction related to the continuity or pressure of water supply.

=== Continuity of water service ===
Urban areas received water service for an average of 17 hours per day in 2005. Only one Peruvian service company has continuous service, the company EMSAP in the Amazon region.

Back in 1997, the total continuity average was at 12 hours per day, 5 hours less than in 2005. Rural areas averaged 18 hours, while in urban areas, service was provided on average for 12 hours. Service averaged 8 hours on the coast, 18 hours in forested and mountainous regions, and 10 hours in metropolitan Lima.

=== Disinfection ===
In 2000, 80% of urban water supply systems used disinfection measures. In urban areas, 43 companies that provided information to the regulator complied with the norms for residual chlorine in the network.

In rural areas, however, in a sample consisting of 1,630 analyzed systems, 59% do not disinfect the water because of lacking the necessary facilities or the lack of chlorine. Considering that locations with less than 2,000 inhabitants have around 11,800 systems, it can be estimated that around 7,000 rural water systems provide water without disinfection.

=== Wastewater treatment ===
The share of treated wastewater in 2004 was estimated at 22%. This is to say that more than three fourths of the wastewater generated did not receive any type of treatment prior to its final discharge, which poses a serious threat to the environment. Back in 1997, the coverage of wastewater treatment had only been 13%. In 2005, only two companies treated all of their sewage, one of them being from the Provincia de Marañón.

The great majority of sewage of the Lima-Callao metropolitan area is discharged without treatment into the ocean, resulting in serious contamination of the surrounding beaches. The Japanese Bank of International Cooperation (JBIC) provided a loan for the sanitation of the Lima-Callao area in 1997. However, the project was not implemented.

In 2013 the Taboada wastewater treatment plant was commissioned in Lima. With a capacity of 1,8 million cubic meters/day it is the largest wastewater treatment plant in South America. It was privately financed as a Build-Operate-Transfer (BOT) project by the Spanish firm Técnicas de Desalinización de Aguas (Tedagua). It is envisaged that some of the treated water will be used for the irrigation of urban parks. Financing for another wastewater treatment plant in La Atarjea has been secured in February 2014 through a 48,66 million Euro loan from the German development bank KfW. The treated waster will be reused for irrigation after being discharged into an existing irrigation canal.

== Water resources and impact of climate change ==
On average, surface water in Peru is abundant. Nevertheless, it is unequally distributed in space and time. Especially the coastal area, where the country's major cities are located and two thirds of the population live, is very dry. Lima with 8 million people, is the world's second largest city located on a desert (after Cairo).

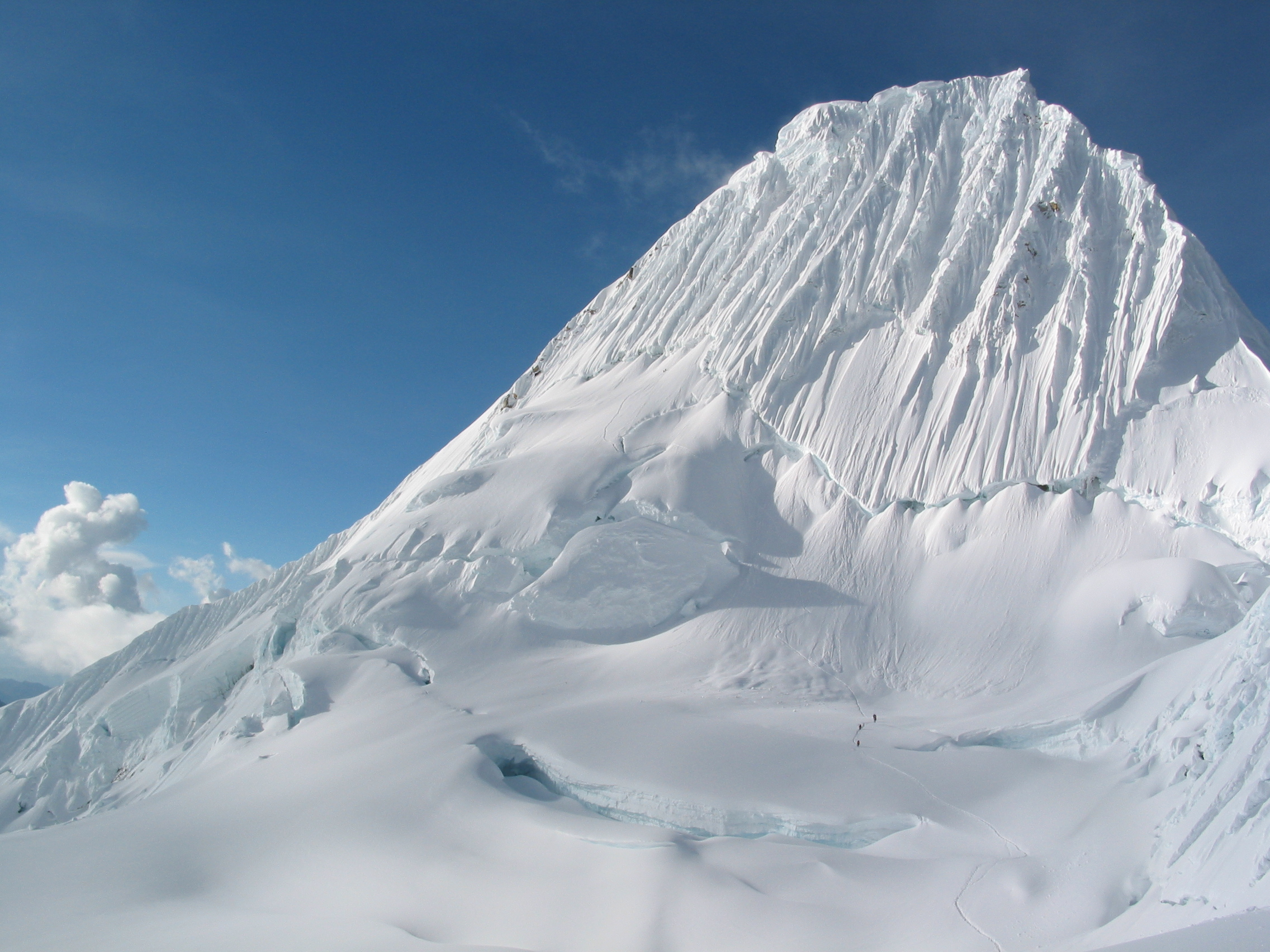
The peaks of the Andes are the source of many Peruvian rivers.

Peru contains over two-thirds of all tropical glaciers which provide important water sources for the dry western half of the country. These glaciers are rapidly melting as a result of climate change, making the flow of rivers more irregular, leading to more droughts and floods. A report by a team from the World Bank published in June 2007 in the bulletin of the American Geophysical Union (AGU) predicts that many of the lower glaciers in the Andes will be gone in the next decade or so, and that glacial runoff may dry up altogether within 20 years. The last comprehensive satellite survey by Peru's National Environmental Council, carried out in 1997, found that the area covered by glaciers had shrunk by 22% since the early 1960s. Partial surveys by geologists suggest that the rate at which the glaciers are melting has sped up over the past decade. Additionally, as these glaciers rapidly melt, they also expose the water to contaminants in the glaciers, such as lead and cadmium, making it unsafe to consume,

For example, the Quelccaya Ice Cap is the second largest in the Peruvian Andes and has shrunk by 30% in the last 33 years. Streams fed by glaciers and rainwater provide water further downstream.

Parts of Peru are in arid, dry desert-like conditions, which in turn have created a drought-like situation. As global temperatures increase, these areas are at higher risk of not obtaining steady access to water in already limited amounts. This is seen in Peru in the primarily Northern part of the country where there is much more desert-like conditions,

=== Sustainability ===
Discussed in Treehugger magazine, there is a sustainability sweet spot, in which a nation has a high level of human development cross-checked with ecologically sustainable use of resources. Peru is one of the very few countries falling into this sweet spot. The sustainability methods of Peru is a relatively modern ideology that has not been thought about in the grand scheme of time. Peru is able to pursue a method of sustainability since it has a large amount of readily available natural resources, as opposed to other countries that rely heavily on imports for mass amounts of natural resources. It is also important to understand how sustainable Peru's future water resources will remain as climate change progresses and rapidly affects the water supply. For example, the Rimac, Chillon, and Lurin River are all central to Peru's water supply, and are not equipped to handle the growing population. As it stands, there are no current plans by the government to deal with this issue.

Sustainability generally refers to the capacity for earth's biosphere and human civilization to coexist. Sustainability is a vital aspect of the WASH sector in development because it conserves the environment, is cost friendly, and promotes healthier development practices. The National Environmental Policy Act of 1969 committed the United States to sustainability, declaring it a national policy "to create and maintain conditions under which humans and nature can exist in productive harmony, that permit fulfilling the social, economic, and other requirements of present and future generations". Institutional sustainability in the WASH sector means that WASH systems, institutions, policies, and procedures at the local level are functional and meet the demand of users of WASH services. The element of environmental sustainability implies placing WASH interventions in the wider context of the natural environment and implementing an approach of integrated and sustainable management of water and waste(-water) flows and resources.

== Water use ==
In 2005, an average of 259 liters/person/day of water were produced in urban areas. Actual water consumption is much lower than this level due to distribution losses estimated around 45%. Per capita water production has decreased by 26% since 1997 when production was at 352 liters/person/day. This decrease may be partly due to an increase in the share of metered users from 24% to 47% (1997–2005). According to the National Sanitation Plan, it is inadmissible that with such high levels of production water supply remains intermittent in many cities.

In rural areas, water use is much lower than in urban areas.

According to a 2008 national survey by the radio station RPP and the World Bank's Water and Sanitation Program (WSP), 38% of respondents indicate that they "take great care" of water in the household. 89% of respondents indicated that they treat tap water before drinking it, primarily by boiling it, and 48% store water in their house because of intermittent supply or because they have no access to piped drinking water.

== History ==
=== Pre-colonial and colonial water infrastructure ===
Prior to Spanish colonization, the indigenous people of Peru managed their water using surface catchments and artesian wells, as well as subterranean aqueducts (puquios) and sewer systems. Roughly 1,700 years old, some of these aqueducts are still in use in the Nazca region; as of 2019 they were under consideration as a World Heritage Site.

The arrival of Spanish conquistadors in the mid-1500s left existing systems largely unchanged, as the Spanish themselves made use of the indigenous systems. However, indigenous infrastructure was put under strain as population centers grew along the dry western coast of Peru; additionally, under colonial policy surplus water withdrawals were encouraged to aid gold and silver mining (as opposed to agriculture). This marked the beginning of the mining industry’s heavy water consumption in Peru, which continues to be a point of high contention in the modern nation’s water sector.

Over the course of the following centuries, rural areas preserved a mix of colonial and indigenous water practices while urban centers like Lima continued to develop along the European model. After the establishment of the independent Peruvian state in 1821, conveyance pipes for drinking water began to be installed throughout Peru, slowly displacing the manual water porter and self-dug wells; the first potable water disinfection plant was installed in Lima in 1917. However waste was still collected in open ditches, and the investments in infrastructure were not organized.

=== The 20th and 21st centuries ===
The institutional framework for the water and sanitation sector has undergone many successive changes, including some reforms that were never implemented and some that considerably changed the responsibilities in the sector. Two reforms that had a lasting impact were the transfer of the responsibility for water supply and sanitation from municipalities to the national government in the late 1960s and the creation of a national water holding company in 1981 consisting of utilities in the large cities. In 1990, the government gave service responsibility in urban areas back to the municipalities. The new government of Fujimori introduced a policy of promoting the private sector and of commercializing the municipal utilities. In 1994 an autonomous regulatory agency was created at the national level. In the meantime the program to promote the private sector stalled: Only in 2005 the first and so far only water concession in Peru was awarded in the city of Tumbes.

==== From municipal service provision to a national holding company ====
In the beginning of the 1960s, the municipalities had the responsibility of providing water and sanitation services. However, this responsibility was transferred to the Ministry of Housing and Construction in most urban areas towards the end of the decade. In rural areas, investments were realized through the Ministry of Public Health. The systems, once built, were handed over to community-based organizations for operation and maintenance. In the 1970s, the large cities of Lima, Arequipa and Trujillo created their own Water and Sanitation Companies.

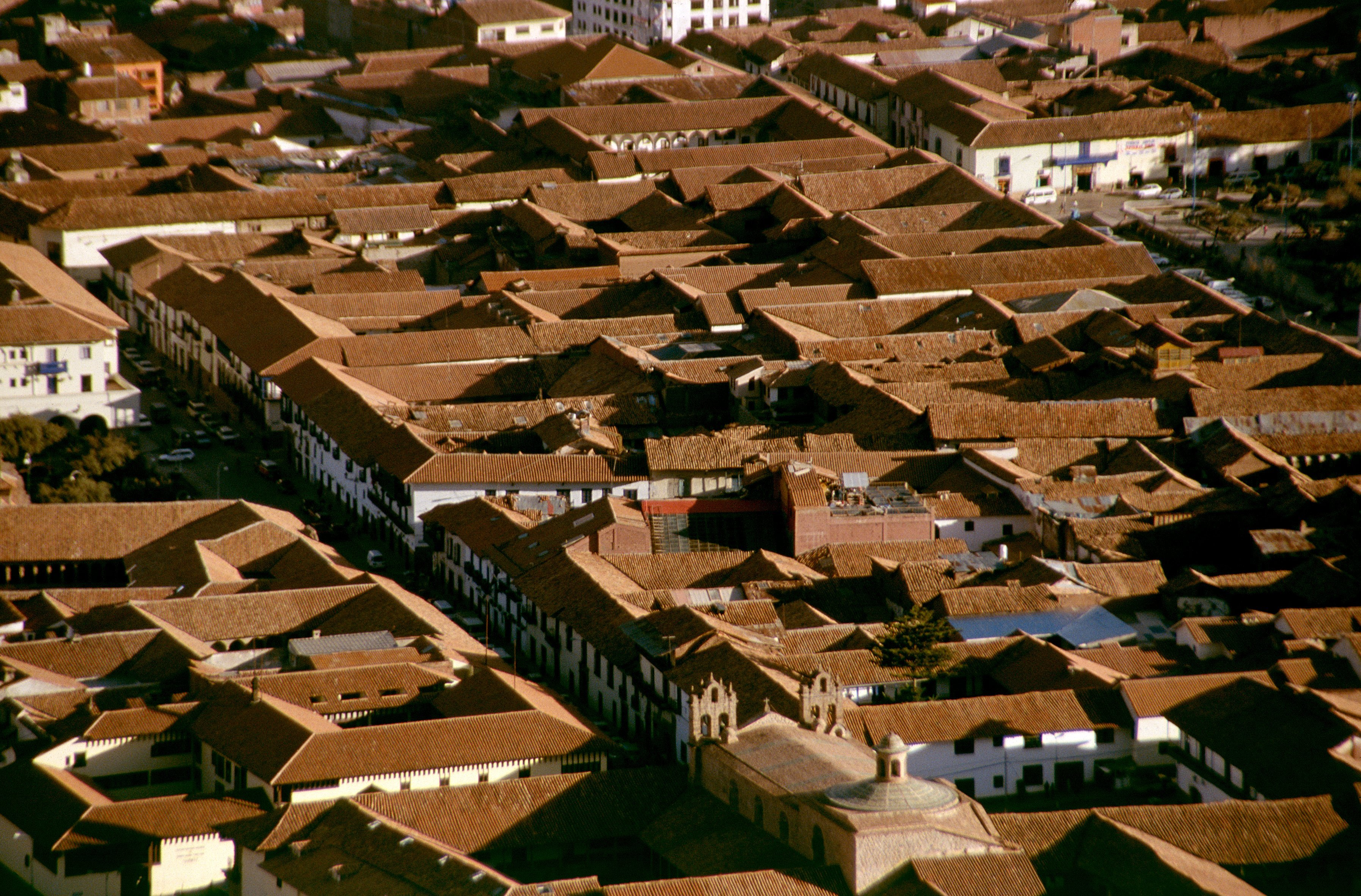
Cusco

In 1981, the government of Fernando Belaúnde Terry merged the three Sanitation Companies of Lima, Arequipa, and Trujillo and the General Directorate for Water and Sanitation of the Ministry of Housing and Construction in a single national state holding company, the National Service of Water and Sewage Supply (SENAPA). SENAPA was composed of 15 constituent companies and 10 operational units. SEDAPAL in Lima was the largest one. 200 cities (20%) were left out of SENAPA and administered their own services.

The Government of Alan García (1985–1990) passed a law that transferred the functions related to rural water and sanitation construction and technical assistance to regional governments. With the change in government in 1990, these changes did not materialize, as the regionalization stalled.

==== Decentralization and commercialization ====
During the 1990s, the water and sanitation sector was decentralized again. In May 1990, the outgoing government of Alan García decided to transfer all SENAPA constituent companies and operational units to the municipalities. SENAPA was to be converted into a company in charge of only giving technical assistance to the municipalities, a decision that was never implemented.

The Government of Alberto Fujimori (1990–2000) initiated another restructuring of the sector with the objectives of commercializing and privatizing the service providers. In 1991, the government enacted the Private Investment Promotion Law for water and sanitation. In 1992, the National Water and Sewage Program (PRONAP) was created. SENAPA and SEDAPAL were placed under the direct authority of the President. In 1994, a new law was passed that created the legal figure of the municipal utility (EPS) as an entity that is legally and financially separate of the municipality. More than ten years later, in 2005, the Water and Sanitation Program of the World Bank called the commercialization of municipal water utilities in the interior of the country a "silent reform in the sector".

The General Law of the National Superintendence of Sanitation Services (SUNASS) was passed in 1994. A tariff restructuring with the objective of achieving financial viability of the EPS was carried out in parallel. Despite the government's expectations, no single public-private partnership in water supply and sanitation was put in place during the Fujimori government and all service providers remained public. Only in October 2005 the first water and sanitation concession contract in Peru was signed in the province of Tumbes. The 30-year concession was awarded after open bidding to a Peruvian-Argentine consortium, Latinaguas-Concyssa. The interventions under the concession were to be financed with the support of a loan and grant from the German development bank KfW.

In La Libertad Region the public company for water supply and sanitation is SEDALIB which is formed by shareholders of municipalities of the Region.

==== Reassertion of state ownership ====
In 2009, a new water law reasserted the state's ownership of national water resources, affirming the government's absolute power in deciding where and by whom water is used. This affirmation resulted in a renewed push for centralized infrastructure via public-private partnerships, with corporations building and operating for an initial period before ownership is re-assumed by the state.

== Water policy and regulation ==
=== Policy ===
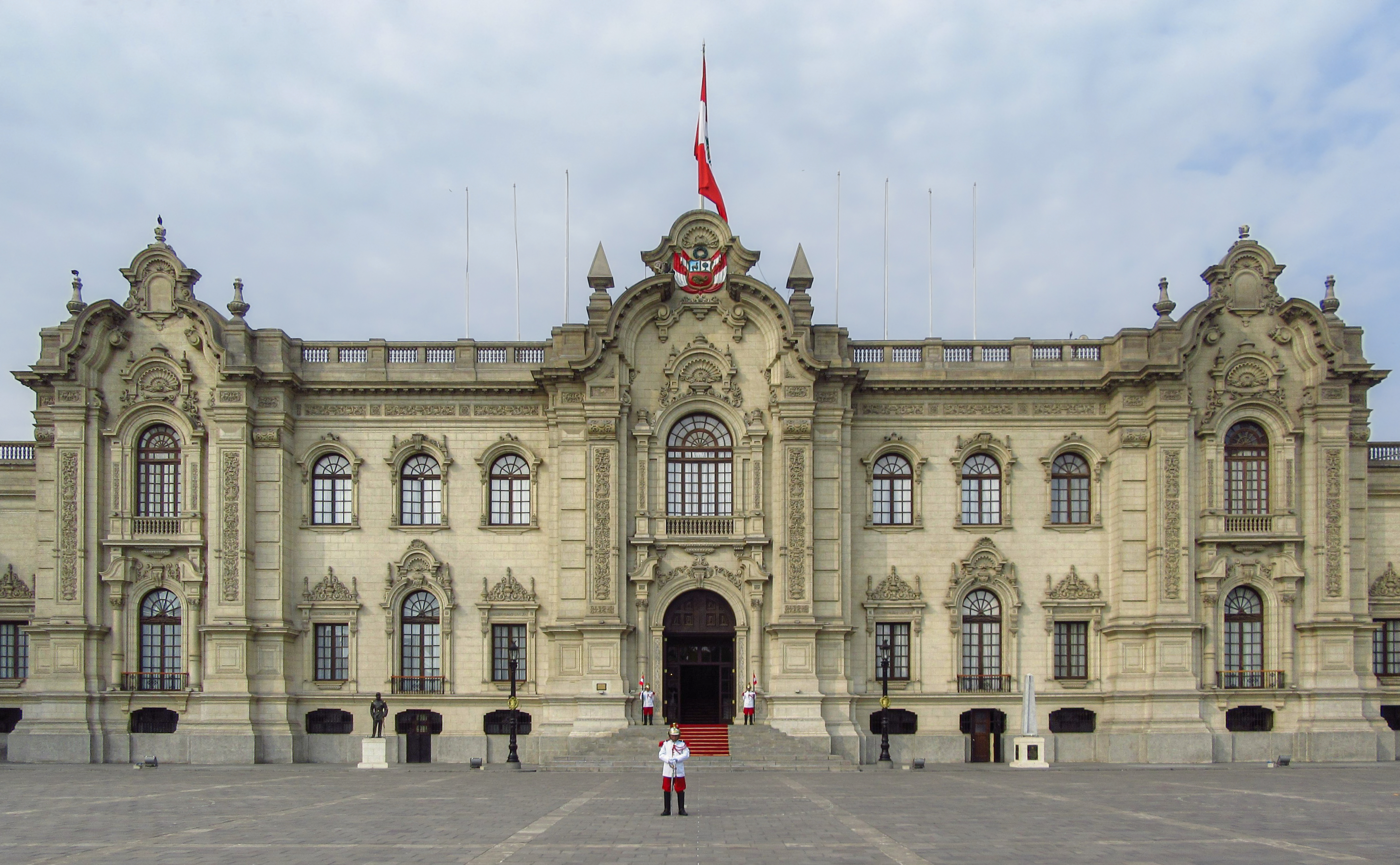
The Government Palace is the official residence of the President.

The Ministry of Housing, Construction, and Sanitation is the sector governing entity through the Vice Ministry of Construction and Sanitation (VMCS) and the National Sanitation Board (DNS). The Ministry formulates, approves, executes and supervises the application of the national water and sanitation policies. The Ministry was created on June 11, 2002, through the Organic Law #27779.

Various drafts of a General Water Law for water resources management have been in discussion for two decades. Nevertheless, no law has been approved up to now.

=== Regulation ===
The sector regulating entity is the National Sanitation Services Supervisory (SUNASS), created by law in 1992. Its functions are to regulate and supervise service providers, approve tariffs, establish norms, impose sanctions for violations of the law, and resolve user controversies and complaints. As part of its supervision activities SUNASS has established a benchmarking system to monitor the performance of service providers.

SUNASS is funded through a 2% surcharge on water bills with an annual budget of approximately US$4 million. According to the law, it enjoys administrative and financial autonomy. Its Board consists of five members nominated as follows:

- 2 by the Prime Minister's Office (including the Board's Chairman)
- 1 by the Ministry of Finance
- 1 by the Ministry of Housing, Construction, Water and Sanitation
- 1 by the Office of Fair Competition (Indecopi)

=== Provision of services ===
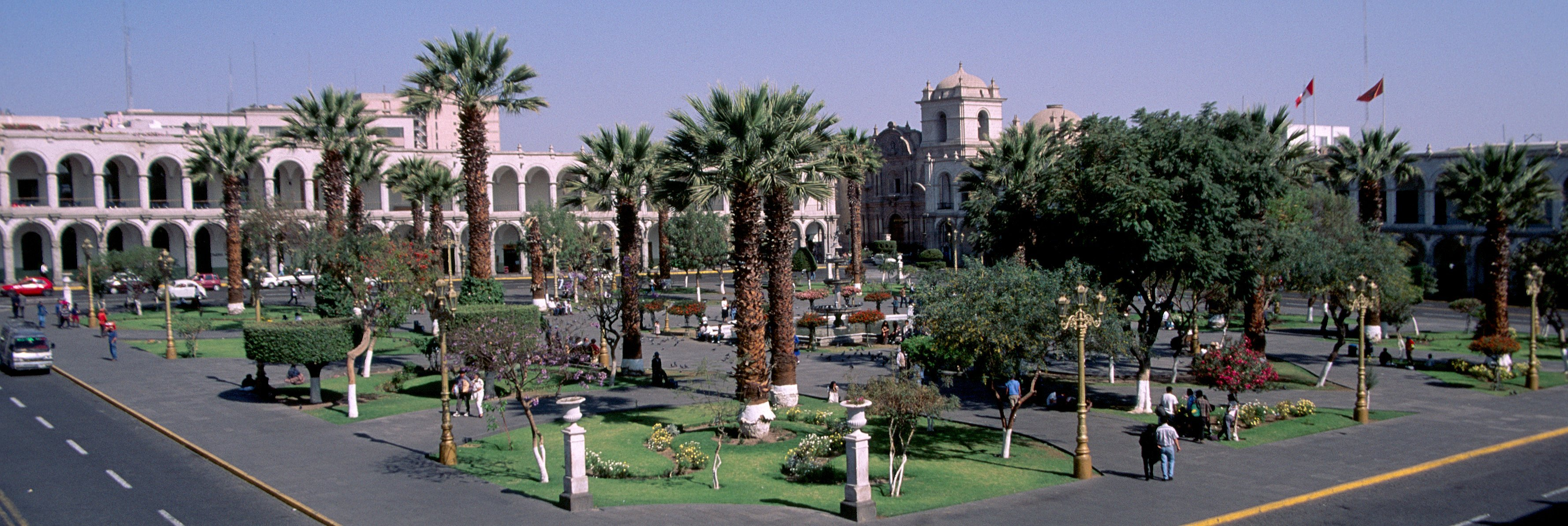
Arequipa

The Peruvian Constitution of 1993 bestows the responsibility of water and sanitation service provision to the city councils. The Ley Orgánica de Municipalidades (Law Nº 27972) states that the function of the provincial municipalities is to directly or by concession administer and regulate the water service, sewage, and drainage. Peru has 194 provincial city councils.

The service providers in the country are:

- Water and Sewer Company (SEDAPAL) in Lima;
- 53 Municipal Service Providers (EPS) in other cities (SEDAPAL and the EPS have 62% of the country's population within their jurisdiction);
- approximately 11,800 Communal Organizations – Sanitation Services Administrative Committees (JASS) – that are responsible for 29% of the population mainly situated in rural areas; and,
- 490 small municipalities that contain 9% of the total population.

When mayors change in Peru this often leads to the removal of the general manager of the municipal service provider (EPS) or of the head of the municipal department in charge of water supply in smaller municipalities that do not have an EPS. In 1999 it was estimated that the EPS changed general managers on the average every 17 months. This happens although the majority of the EPS are made up of several provincial municipalities, which in theory should decrease the influence of city governments and reduce the political interference in the administration of companies.

Nearly all of the country's service providers remain weak in financial and institutional aspects, as well as in human resources, despite attempts to strengthen them.

=== Support to Communal Organizations ===
A key function in the water and sanitation sector that is frequently neglected is the support to communal organizations that provide services, mainly in rural areas. This function can be assigned to municipalities, EPS, or to national entities with departmental filiations.

The WHO observed that in 2000 the municipal participation in assistance to rural services was insufficient to different extents, ranging from its total exclusion to the need for support in the preparation of the technical records and the complete integration in the planning, financing, and construction supervision processes.

The regional governments have technical and financial supporting functions (also see Peru Regulation). The 24 separate Regional Boards of Housing, Construction, and Sanitation – one in each department – support them in this role.

Many interventions in rural areas during the 1990s were made without verifying the community demand and without their contributions to the execution of the projects. This resulted in overly designed systems that the communities did not maintain thus leading to loss of public funds.

Since 2002, the PRONASAR project supports the Administrative Assemblies of Sanitation Services (JASS) directly and through NGOs as well as municipalities.

=== Other functions ===
The Ministry of Health (MINSA) is also participating in the sector through the General Director's Office of Environmental Health (DIGESA) and the Executive Director's Office on Basic Sanitation (DESAB), entities which exert functions in the aspects pertaining to sanitary and water quality for human consumption and the protection of a healthy environment.

Other institutions which act and participate in the sector are the Ministry of Economy and Finances (MEF) that specifically interferes in the aspects of economic sectoral and normative planning related to finances; several NGOs and the private sector, among others.

The National Cooperation Fund for Social Development (FONCODES), created in 1991, channels resources to investing in marginalized rural and urban areas in various sectors including potable water and sanitation. Within the framework of the state decentralization process, since October 2003, FONCODES transfers resources to the district city councils verified for social infrastructure projects, offering technical assistance and contributes to the capacity building for the responsible handling of social investments. The FONCODES depends on the Ministry of Women and Social Development (MIMDES). Since the beginning of PRONASAR, FONCODES has retired from water and sanitation activities in rural areas.

Some 46 service providers have formed the National Peruvian Association of Sanitation Service Providers (ANEPPSA) to "promote the excellence in sanitation services management" through training and exchange of experiences.

== Ongoing public-private partnerships ==
In 2006-07 nine small towns (between 5,000 and 25,000 inhabitants) across Peru introduced a new water and sanitation management model, under which the community is being more empowered, including through deciding themselves about a certain level of service quality, such as low-cost technologies, and corresponding tariffs. Subsequently the municipality hires a specialized operator who is being regulated by a Community Supervision Board under a Public-Private-Social Partnership. The specialized operator can be a private or a mixed company. The aim of the new approach was to break with the low-level equilibrium of poor service quality and poor cost recovery that prevails throughout small towns in Peru, under which poor quality water services are provided directly by the municipality. The new approach was supported through the Small Town Pilot Project (STPP) of the Ministry of Housing, with technical support from the World Bank's Water and Sanitation Program (WSP) and financial support of US$6.6 million from the Canadian International Development Agency for limited infrastructure investments and training for both the operator and members of the Community Supervision Boards. After the municipal elections of 2007, 3 new mayors decided to abandon the new approach and to return to the old model of direct municipal management. In the 6 other cities specialized operators continue to operate.

=== "Agua para todos" (2006) ===
In September 2006, the new President Alan García announced an ambitious investment plan for the water and sanitation sector called Agua para todos (that is, water for everyone), promising water access to all Peruvians – mainly to the poorest – by the end of his mandate. However, as of 2020, there have been no further developments on this proposed plan. Currently, water delivery projects by the Peruvian government involve partnerships with NGOs such as the non-profit also called "Water for Everyone".

=== EcoSwell ===
Founded in 2013, the NGO EcoSwell works on water and sanitation projects across Peru (amongst other sectors of work); they are based in the northwestern Lobitos district of the Talara region, an arid coastal area that faces water stress. To combat the challenges of derelict infrastructure and environmental degradation, EcoSwell primarily constructs physical WASH projects with the help of local residents and interns, including bio-remediation for wastewater management, dry toilets, grey water reuse, desalination, and groundwater monitoring. Their bottom-up approach to community mobilization focuses on the long-term sustainability of Peru's ecology, with a commitment to a steady-state economy.

== Economic efficiency ==
It is estimated that 45% of the water produced is not counted due to physical and commercial losses, which is higher than the other 40% average of Water and sanitation in Latin America. This coefficient has not changed a lot during the last 12 years. The highest levels are detected in the provinces of Marañón and Barranca (greater than 70%). Some companies had water levels not accounted for at less than 10%, however, these values do not seem viable given the low level of household metering (50%).

== Financial aspects ==
Water tariffs in Peru are somewhat low compared to other Latin American countries and water bills are often not paid. As a result, according to an estimate, 95% of the country's urban service providers can be considered bankrupt. In many urban areas it is common to spend significant sums to water tanker operators, which are prevalent because of intermittent supply and deficient coverage. In rural areas, tariffs are even lower than the already low tariffs in urban areas, making it impossible to properly maintain water systems.

=== Urban areas ===
Tariffs In 2004, water tariffs in Peru were on average Sol 1.29/m3 (US$0.38/m3) in urban areas. Average urban tariffs increased slightly from Sol 1.04/m3 in 1997 (US$0.40/m3 with 1997 monetary values) to Sol 1.45/m3 in 2000 (US$0.42/m3), however dropped in real terms thereafter. Each provider has its own tariffs, with significant differences between them, ranging from Sol 0.45/m3 in Valle del Mantaro (US$0.14/m3) to Sol 2.60/m3 in Ilo (US$0.79/m3) in 2005.

Users in urban areas that do not have access to piped water pay much higher prices for water from water tankers.

According to a 2008 national survey by Radio RPP, respondents indicated that, on average, they paid 44 Soles (close to US$15) per month and per household for water. 44% of respondents said that they paid "much or too much" for water.

Cost recovery In 1999, water companies billed only 55% of the produced water and of this value only 50% was actually paid. Payment arrears were equivalent to 140 days of billed revenues.

There are significant differences in levels of cost recovery among service providers. For example, SEDAPAL had an operating margin of 35% in 2000, while the EPS had an average operating margin of only 16%. 6 out of 46 EPS had a negative operating margin.

Only five years later in 2005, according to the World Bank's Water and Sanitation Program, no more than 5% of the EPS and of the municipalities had the financial capacity to carry out their functions. The rest are considered financially bankrupt. In the same year, the government decided to apply a new tariff regulation model. The government contracted studies for the elaboration of this model with the support from the Public-Private Infrastructure Advisory Facility (PPIAF), a World Bank trust fund, and later from the IDB.

=== Rural areas ===
In rural areas, the water committees apply fixed monthly tariffs independently of use as the use of water meters is not common in these areas. The tariff is estimated to be the equivalent of US$0.50/month and household. At a consumption of 20 cubic meter per month and household this corresponds to US$0.025 per cubic meter, or about 15 times less than the average tariff in urban areas. Needless to say, the revenues generated are insufficient for the operation and maintenance of the systems.

=== Ability to Pay ===
In 1997, the average the Peruvian household spent 1.8% of their total expenses in water, including water bought from carro-tanques, but without spending in sanitation. In urban areas they spent 1.9% of the expenses for water and only 0.8% in rural areas. The poorest (first decil) spent 2.4% in urban areas and 1.7% in rural areas.

=== Investments and financing ===
As shown in the bar chart below, investment levels increased substantially during much of the 1990s, from US$39 million in 1990 to a peak of US$422 million in 1997. Since then investments have declined again to US$106 million in 2004 and US$190 million in 2005. Total investment between 1990 and 2005 was at US$43.3 billion, the average being at US$205m p.a. Investments are financed through programs providing subsidies to municipal utilities, as well as to a limited extent by internal cash generation and debt.

==== In the 1990s ====
Between 1990 and 1998, an annual average of US$228.9 million was invested for water and sanitation infrastructure, equivalent to 0.5% of the GDP. In this period the investments in the sector increased from US$1.1/per capita in 1990 to US$15/per capita in 1998, the latter being an unusually high investment level compared to other Latin American countries. These investments were financed as follows:

- 26% by SEDAPAL, financed by internal cash generation and debt;
- 17% by grants from the central government through the Social Fund FONCODES, destined primarily at rural areas,
- 10% by grants through the Program for the Support of Water Sector Reform (PARSSA), destined primarily at provincial cities;
- 22% by municipal companies, municipalities and NGOs;
- 23% by debt from the National Housing Fund FONAVI; and
- 2% by the Southern Zone Lima Metropolitan Sewer System Improvement Project (MESIAS), a project to improve the sanitary conditions of southern Lima, reducing the coastal contamination from wastewater.

In 2000 total debt contracted by service providers stood at US$1.15 billion, equivalent to the operating margin of all service providers over 9 years. 46% of this debt contributed to reimbursable contributions by the National Housing Fund FONAVI.

==== 2000-2005 ====
The period between 2000 and 2005 witnessed investments of US$833.1 million (US$166.6 million/year) in the sector, carried out by the following entities:

Program	Share of investment
SEDAPAL	45%
PARSSA	14%
MESIAS	12%
EPS	10%
Municipalities	7%
FONCODES	7%
Others	5%
Total	100%

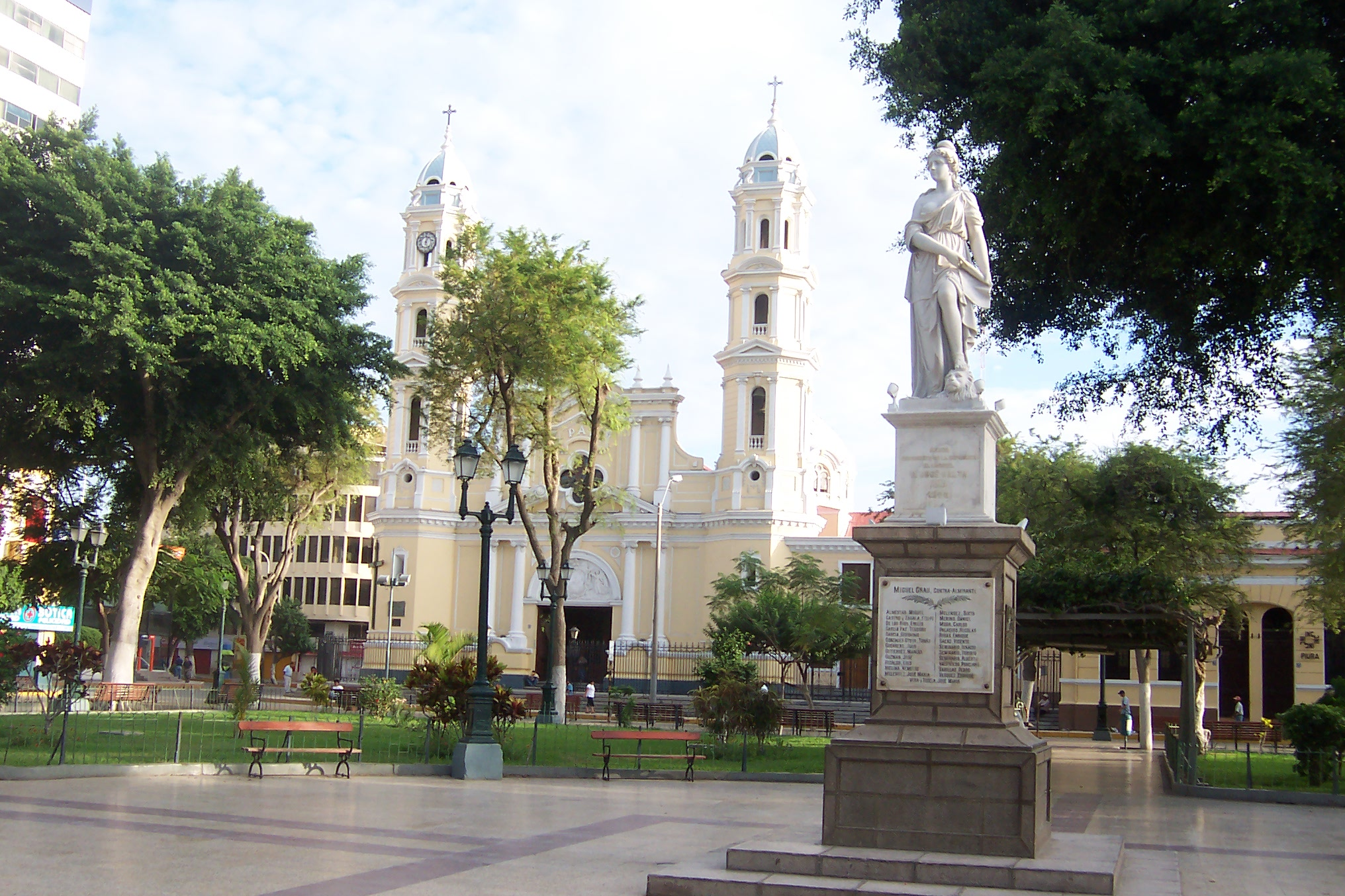
Plaza de Armas in the city of Piura

==== Future investments ====
The government's draft National Sanitation Plan considers that investments of US$4,789 million would be needed in 2005-2015 (US$497 million/year) to achieve the Millennium Development Goals in the sector.

However, billions more would be needed to divert water along tunnels beneath the Andes if glacial melting accelerates.

== External cooperation ==
Multilateral financial institutions including the World Bank, the Inter-American Development Bank, and the Andean Development Corporation (CAF) as well as bilateral cooperation agencies (the German KfW and GTZ, the Canadian CIDA, and the Japanese JICA (ex-JBIC), among others) play an important role in investment financing and in technical assistance in the sector.

Assistance to segments of the sector, differentiated by the size of localities, is provided by different donors:

- The World Bank provides support to rural areas as well as to small towns with populations less than 30,000 through the PRONASAR (see above).
- Larger towns and small cities — such as Ayacucho, Cajamarca or Puno — receive support from KfW.
- Larger cities — such as Tumbes, Piura or Cusco — receive support from KfW, IDB and JICA.
- The CAF, the World Bank, and the JICA support SEDAPAL in Lima and Callao.

An example of this support is the agreement signed in September 2009 by the Japan International Cooperation Agency (JICA) to provide a loan for up to $60 million for the North Lima Metropolitan Area Water Supply and Sewerage Optimization Project. The purpose of the project is to improve the quality of water and sanitation services by renovating the water supply network and improving its operation and management. It aims at reducing non-revenue water and increasing the continuity of water supply. The project complements another JICA-supported project to build a water treatment plant, water distribution systems, and sewerage systems in marginal areas of the same place.

== See also ==
- Electricity sector in Peru
- Irrigation in Peru
- Water resources management in Peru
- Water supply and sanitation in Latin America

== Sources ==
- Ministry of Housing, Construction, and Sanitation: National Housing and Water Plan 2006-2015
- (in Spanish) Ing. Scott A. Muller: Agua, Energia y el Cambio Climático en Lima Metropolitana, 2010
- Dr. Julio Calderón Cockburn: Water and Sanitation – The case of rural Peru, 2004
- (in Spanish) The Inter-American Platform of Human Rights, Democracy, and Development (PIDHDD), a Mercosur Initiative, Peru Water 2006
- USAID/Environmental Health Project/WSP/PAHO: Evaluation of Peru's Sanitation Policies, 2004
- (in Spanish) WHO/PAHO: Desigualdades en el acceso, uso y gasto con el agua potable en América Latina y el Caribe, 2001
- (in Spanish) WHO/PAHO/CEPIS 2000: Water and Sanitation Evaluation Peru, 2000
