= Water supply and sanitation in Mozambique =

Data
- Water coverage (broad definition): 47% (2015)
- Sanitation coverage (broad definition): 24% (2015)
- Continuity of supply: 12–14 hours (Maputo in 2007), 22–24 hours (Beira, Quelimane, Nampula, Pemba in 2007)
- Average urban water use (L/person/day): n/a
- Average urban water and sanitation tariff (US$/m^{3}): 12,500 Meticais/m3 (US$0.54/m3) in Maputo and between 10,200 and 11,200 Meticais/m3 (0.44–0.49/m3) in Beira, Quelimane, Nampula and Pemba (2005)
- Share of household metering: Low
- Annual investment in WSS: n/a
- Share of external financing: 85% external financing (2006–2008)

Institutions
- Decentralization to municipalities: Yes
- National water and sanitation company: Two asset-holding companies: FIPAG for water in large cities; AIAS for sanitation in large cities and water supply in small towns
- Water and sanitation regulator: CRA
- Responsibility for policy setting: Ministry of Public Works and Housing
- Sector law: No
- No. of urban service providers: n/a
- No. of rural service providers: n/a

Water supply and sanitation in Mozambique is characterized by low levels of access to at least basic water sources (estimated to be 47% in 2015), low levels of access to at least basic sanitation (estimated to be 24% in 2015) and mostly poor service quality. In 2007 the government has defined a strategy for water supply and sanitation in rural areas, where 62% of the population lives. In urban areas, water is supplied by informal small-scale providers and by formal providers.

Beginning in 1998, Mozambique has reformed the formal part of the urban water supply sector through the creation of an independent regulatory agency called CRA, an asset-holding company called FIPAG and a public-private partnership (PPP) with a company called Aguas de Moçambique. The PPP covered those areas of the capital and of four other cities that had access to formal water supply systems. However, the PPP ended when the management contracts for four cities expired in 2008 and when the foreign partner of the company that served the capital under a lease contract withdrew in 2010, claiming heavy losses.

While urban water supply has received considerable policy attention, the government has no strategy for urban sanitation yet. External donors finance about 85% of all public investments in the sector. The main donors in the water sector are the World Bank, the African Development Bank, Canada, the Netherlands, Sweden, Switzerland and the United States.

== Access ==
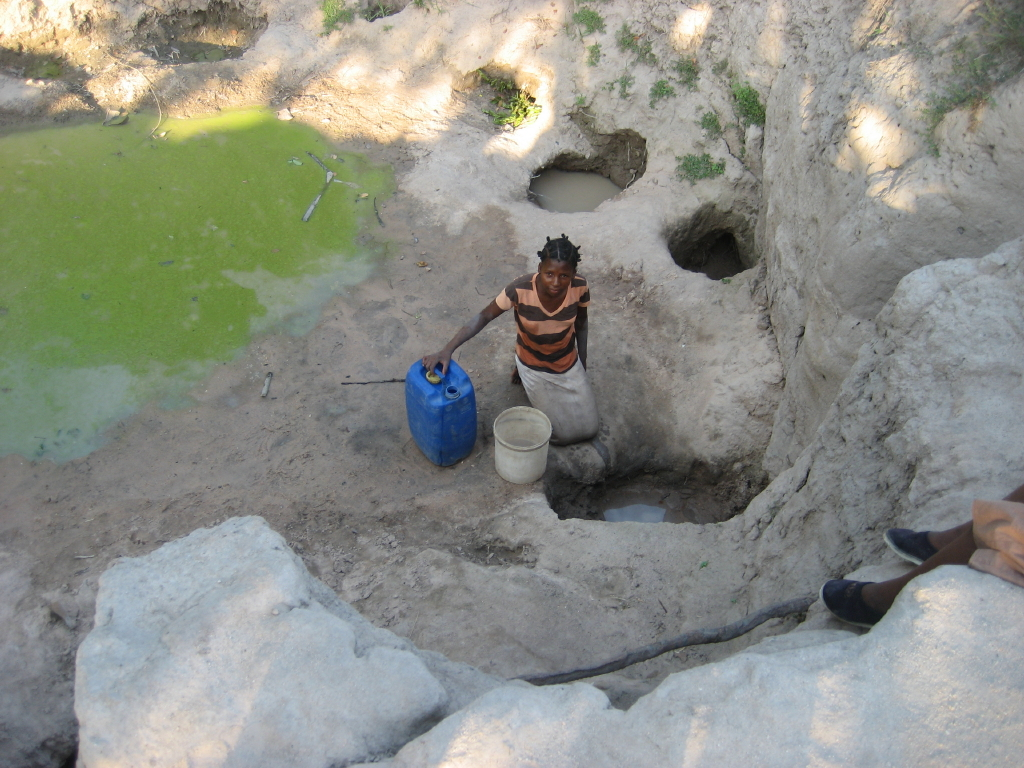
Woman fetching water during the dry season from a polluted source in Machaze District of the Central Manica Province.

Only about 47% of the Mozambican population has access to an at least basic water source, and only 24% has access to at least basic sanitation. Consequences on living conditions are multiple, ranging from poor health to lower productivity due to the time needed to fetch water.

Figures on access are controversial. For example, the WHO/UNICEF Joint Monitoring Program for Water Supply and Sanitation estimates access to an at least basic source of water supply at 79% in urban areas and 32% in rural areas as of 2015. However, the Ministry of Public Works uses the water access figures of 38% in urban areas and 40% in rural areas. The numbers for rural access are derived from the number of boreholes and an estimated average number of households using a borehole.

		Urban (38% of the population)	Rural (62% of the population)	Total
Water	'At least basic' definition	79%	32%	47%
Water	House connections	not available	not available	not available
Sanitation	'At least basic' definition	47%	12%	24%
Sanitation	Sewerage	not available	not available	not available

Source: Joint Monitoring Program for Water Supply and Sanitation of WHO and UNICEF

There are also conflicting figures about what are the target figures to meet the MDGs for water and sanitation by 2015. According to a World Bank document it means urban access to water increasing to 78% and rural access increasing to 56%. However, according to a MDG status report it means increasing access to 70% in both urban and rural areas.

== Service quality ==
There are few published reliable data on water and sanitation service quality in Mozambique. Many water systems provide water intermittently. However, four cities – Beira, Pemba, Quelimane and Nampula – have achieved continuous or almost continuous water supply as a result of private sector participation, increasing the hours of water supply per day from 9 hours (Beira and Quelimane) and 17 hours (Nampula and Pemba) in 2002 to 22–24 hours in 2007. Water supply in Maputo remains intermittent, increasing only slightly from 12 to 14 hours.

== History ==
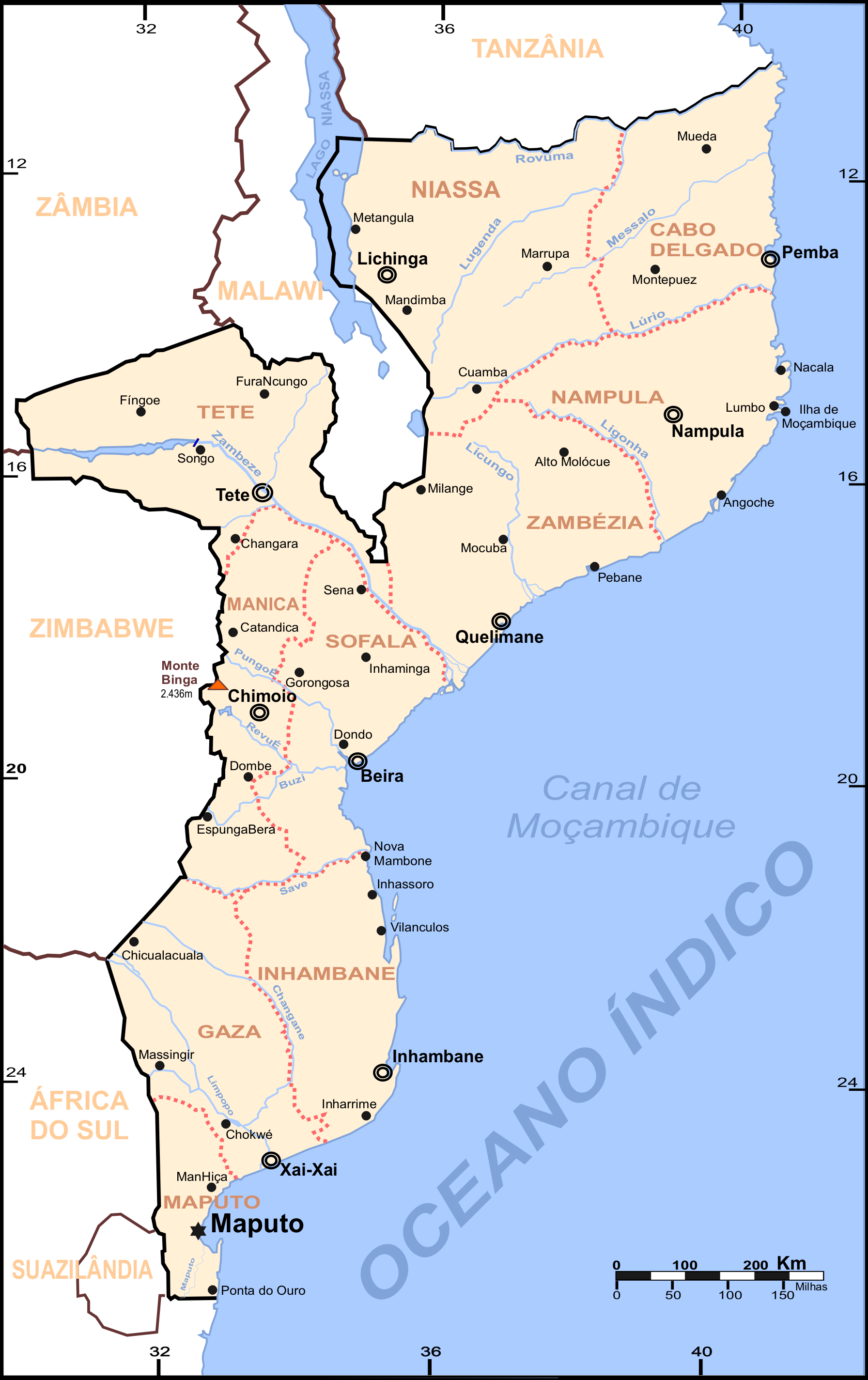
A map of Mozambique showing, among others, cities with private sector participation in water supply.

=== National Water Policy of 1995 and institutional reforms ===
In 1995, Mozambique approved a National Water Policy that emphasizes community participation and, for urban water supply, private sector participation. In 1998 the World Bank approved its First National Water Development Project in support of the National Water Policy. Other donors provided co-financing for the project.

In 1998 two key institutions were created to implement the National Water Policy: The regulatory agency CRA and the Asset Holding Company FIPAG. The government also approved a water tariff policy aiming at cost recovery.

=== Private sector participation (1999–2012) ===
In 1999 the government competitively awarded a hybrid lease/management contract for seven cities to an international consortium called Aguas de Moçambique (AdeM), which was led by the French firm SAUR (35%) and included Aguas de Portugal (32%). For Maputo and Matola the contract consisted of a 15-year lease and for the other cities of a 5-year management contract. AdEM also included a 30%-shareholding by a Mozambican holding company called Mazi of Mozambique consisting of six local shareholders. AdeM's financial bid was substantially lower than that of the closest competitor. According to a World Bank study, it ultimately proved to be unrealistically low.

By 2001 AdeM had encountered serious financial difficulties, exacerbated by the impact of the disastrous 2000 Mozambique flood. When an independent review denied tariff increases to compensate for the flood damages, SAUR withdrew from the contract in October 2001. In December it sold its shares for a nominal amount to Águas de Portugal. Subsequently, FIPAG and AdeM renegotiated the contracts, obtaining higher fees and improvements in the specification of service obligations and procedures.

In 1999 the World Bank approved the Second National Water Development Project In 2004 the five-year management contract for the smaller cities was extended by three years. The contract was subsequently extended by another year and ended in March 2008, so that only Maputo remained under private management. The World Bank's 2006 completion report of the first project "rated the outcome for the project satisfactory, its sustainability likely and its institutional development impact substantial".

In December 2010 the government, through FIPAG, bought the 73 percent of the shares in AdeM held by Águas de Portugal, thus effectively and unspectacularly ending the era of private sector participation in urban water supply in Mozambique four years before the end of the lease contract in 2014. Águas de Portugal said it had made losses of 10 million Euros. The sales price had been determined by the International Finance Corporation and was set at 2.6 million Euros. In August 2011 AdeM changed its name to Águas da Região de Maputo (Waters of the Maputo Region), reflecting in its name the reduction of its service area that had occurred in 2008.

In 2004, FIPAG entered into a three-year contract with the Dutch company Vitens under which the latter provided management support services and training in four small southern cities – Xai-Xai, Chokwe, Inhambane and Maxixe. Another contract between FIPAG and Vitens was signed in 2006 for services in five additional small cities in central Mozambique – Tete, Moatize, Chimoio, Manica and Gondola. At the time, these contracts were considered transitional arrangements to prepare the services for more conventional delegated management.

While Vitens' obligations under the first contract were similar to those in AdeM's management contract, its services were provided free of charge and its staffing arrangements were quite different. While AdEM management changed constantly and its expatriate-only team was based in Maputo only, according to a World Bank study, Vitens used a staffing model with only the team leader residing in Mozambique, assisted by short-term experts from the Netherlands. The Dutch team developed a close working relationship with Mozambican team members, thus strengthening local capacity.

=== National Rural Water Supply and Sanitation Program (2007 onwards) ===
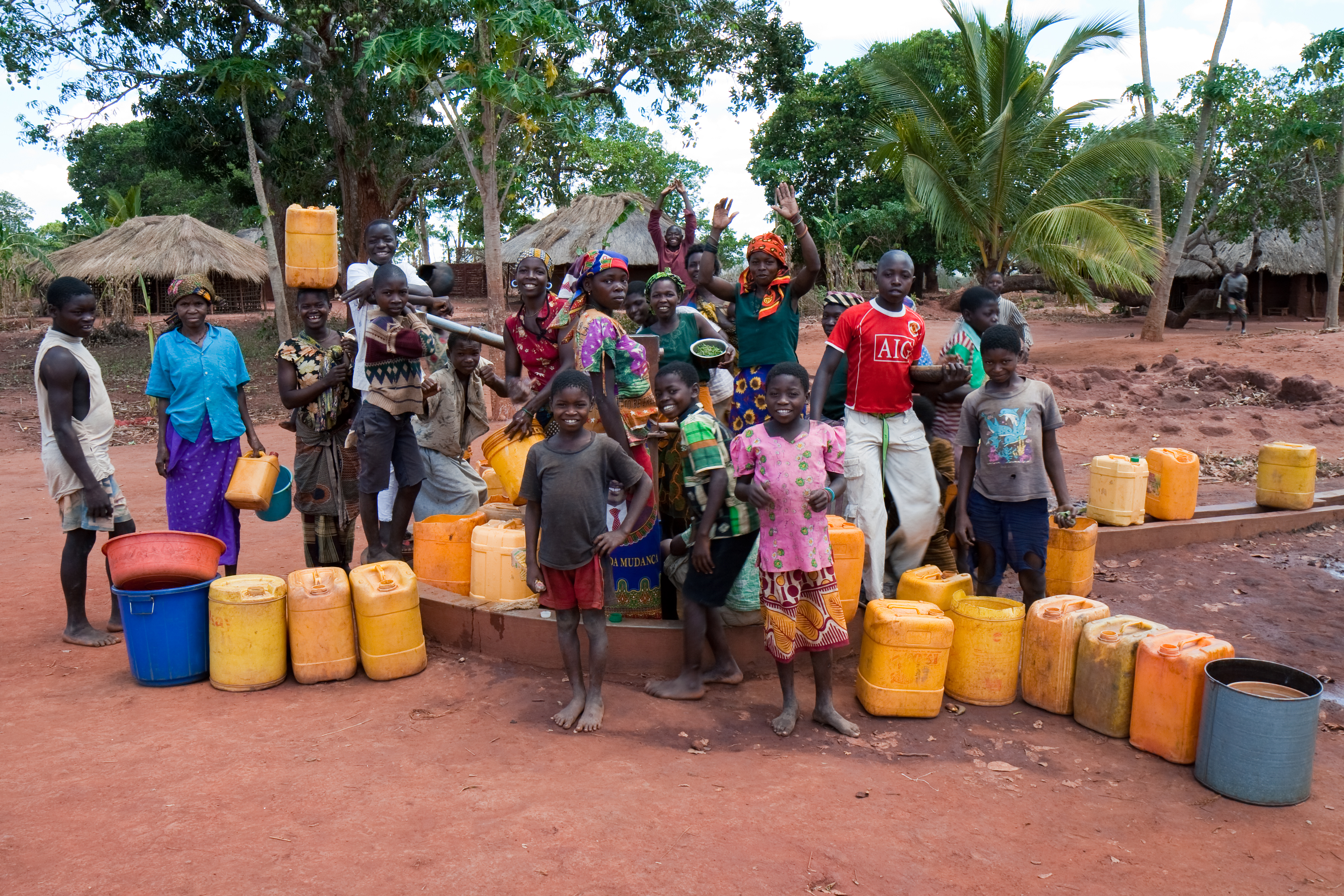
Women and children at a handpump on a tubewell in Nivali, Nampula Province.

Through the Decentralization Law of 1997, which created municipal governments with elected leaders, and the Law of Local State Organs of 2003 the 129 district and 11 provincial governments of Mozambique are supposed to gradually take over more responsibilities in various fields including water supply. Decisions about investments are expected to be taken at the local level. However, the district and provincial governments often still lack the financial and human resources to carry out their responsibilities. In 2007 a National Rural Water and Sanitation Strategic Plan has been adopted, which led to the decision to create Provincial Water and Sanitation Services (SPAS) in 2009 and the establishment of a common fund for rural water supply and sanitation (PRONASAR) in 2010.

Canada, the Netherlands, UNICEF, Switzerland, the UK and the African Development Bank contributed to the Common Fund. The 129 districts of Mozambique are the focal point for planning and implementing the program. In 2010/11 a baseline water supply and sanitation survey has been carried out covering 2,500 households in 75 districts.

In mid-2011 the director and financial administrator of the central regional office of the Asset Holding Company (FIPAG), José Duarte and Henriques Leonardo, were fired because they were accused of having created a private water supply company, Recta, which competed with FIPAG to supply water to ships in Beira port. A year later they were arrested after the case against them had been compiled. The affair is said to have caused FIPAG losses of 37 million meticais (US$1.23 million).

== Responsibility for water supply and sanitation ==
For urban two public Asset Holding Companies – FIPAG in the 13 largest cities, AIAS in secondary towns – own the water and sewerage assets. Besides them, informal small-scale independent water providers own and operate local piped water systems in urban areas without a formal license. In Maputo alone, there are 450 such operators that provide water to 350,000 people. In rural areas, community-based organizations are in charge of maintenance of water infrastructure.

=== Policy and Asset Holding Companies ===
The National Directorate of Water (DNA) in the Ministry of Public Works and Housing is in charge of policy for water supply. The Water Supply Investment and Asset Fund – the Fundo de Investimento e Patrimonio do Abastecimento de Agua (FIPAG) – is an asset holding company in Maputo and several other cities. It operates under triannual performance contracts with the Ministry of Public Works and Housing. In 2009 a second asset holding company – the Administração de Infraestruturas de Abastecimento de Água e Saneamento (AIAS) – was created for urban sanitation and water supply in secondary towns. The Ministry of Health is in charge of setting and monitoring compliance with drinking water standards.

=== Regulation ===
The urban water supply sector is regulated by the regulatory agency Conselho de Regulacao do Abastecimento de Agua (CRA). Its mission is “to ensure a balance between the quality of the service, the interests of consumers and the financial sustainability of the water supply systems.” It does so by approving tariffs, setting service quality targets, monitoring compliance with the targets, reviewing investment programs and hearing complaints by users and municipalities. CRA does not yet have the mandate to cover urban sanitation service or small-scale independent water providers.

=== Service provision ===
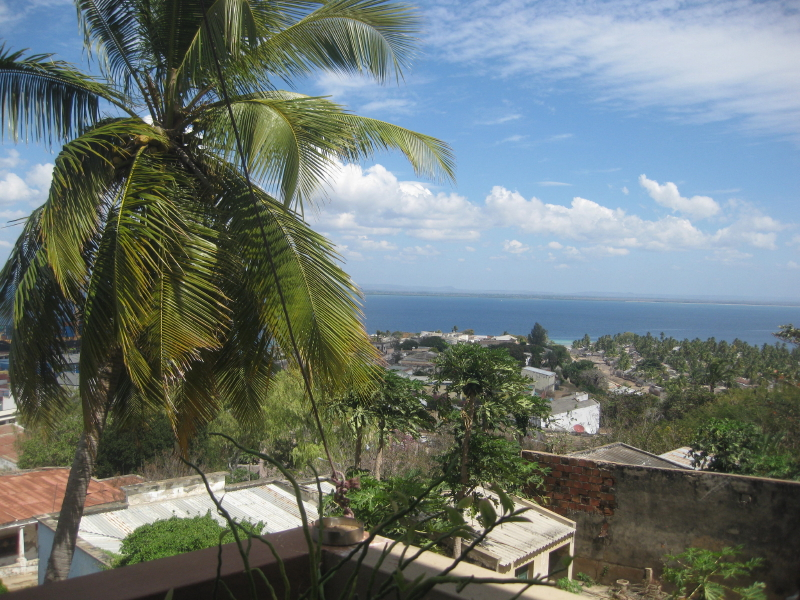
A view of the old town of Pemba, one of the provincial capitals where a private company provides drinking water under a management contract.

FIPAG is the owner of water and sewerage assets in 13 cities. In the Maputo Region the company Águas da Região de Maputo (Waters of the Maputo Region) operates the public water and sewer system under contract with FIPAG. ARM is majority-owned by FIPAG (73%) with a minority owned by the private Mozambican holding company Mazi. In the remaining cities, public municipal water departments operate and maintain the systems. De facto, municipal governments play a very limited role in water supply and sanitation despite their legal responsibilities. Their revenue is so low that they depend on the central government for funding.

=== Rural services ===
Rural water and sanitation services have been falling under the National Directorate of Water – Direcção Nacional das Águas (DNA) under the department Water and Sanitation (Departemento Água e Saneamento) until December 2015. Then DNA was split into two separate Directorates – and drinking water and sanitation came under Director Nacional Abastecimento de Agua e Saneamento (DNAAS).

The PRONASAR report of 2012 highlighted that capacity of district staff is still a blockage. In total 274 people are on water and sanitation positions in the 128 districts.

== Financial aspects ==
=== Tariffs ===
No detailed and up-to-date data on water tariffs in Mozambique are available. Tariffs follow an increasing-block structure. In 2005 average water tariffs in Maputo were 12,500 Meticais (US$0.54/m3) and between 10,200 and 11,200 Meticais per cubic meter (0.44–0.49/m3) in Beira, Quelimane, Nampula and Pemba.

CRA approved real average tariff increases of 5 to 10 percent per year in the service areas of the private company AdeM over the period 2002–07, applying a tariff indexation formula. However, after adjustment for inflation tariffs barely increased. Due to the contract structure, the limited inflation-adjusted increases benefited the public asset holding company FIPAG, not the private operator. FIPAG's financial performance improved steadily as a result of the tariff increases. The water company for Maputo has to pay a regulatory fee to CRA, and all licensed water companies have to pay water abstraction charges to the central government for pumping water from rivers or the ground. These fees and charges are added to the water tariff.

=== Cost recovery ===
The government aims to gradually achieve full cost recovery for water supply, as stated in its 1998 water tariff policy. According to the World Bank, the urban asset holding company FIPAG is "achieving full cost recovery and can graduate from government subsidies". On the other hand, the Mozambique MDG status report for water and sanitation notes that the sector as a whole still strongly depends on donor financing. In rural areas revenues are by far insufficient to recover operation and maintenance costs.

=== Investment ===
There are no reliable data on actual investments in the sector. It has been estimated in 2006 that the water sector requires annual public investments of US$82 million to reach the MDGs, compared to US$67 million annually that have been "planned". According to the World Bank, in 2007 Mozambique's delegated private sector management approach has attracted about US$350 million to urban water over the previous six years.

=== Financing ===
About 85 percent of investments in water supply were financed by aid in 2006–08. External financing has increased by 150 percent as compared to 2003–05, from US$46 million to US$116 million. Funding channeled through the national budget has been disbursed at a rate of 82 percent, while donor-managed projects disbursed only at an average rate of 58 percent.

=== Planning and Monitoring ===
A 2009 Water Sector Public Expenditure Review by the World Bank found that there are numerous planning documents, but still no comprehensive planning. Donors are not well coordinated and the Ministry of Finance changes budget allocations in mid-year. While there are many reports on outputs and on disbursements, the two are not linked to each other so that it is impossible to estimate value for money.

== Efficiency of utilities ==
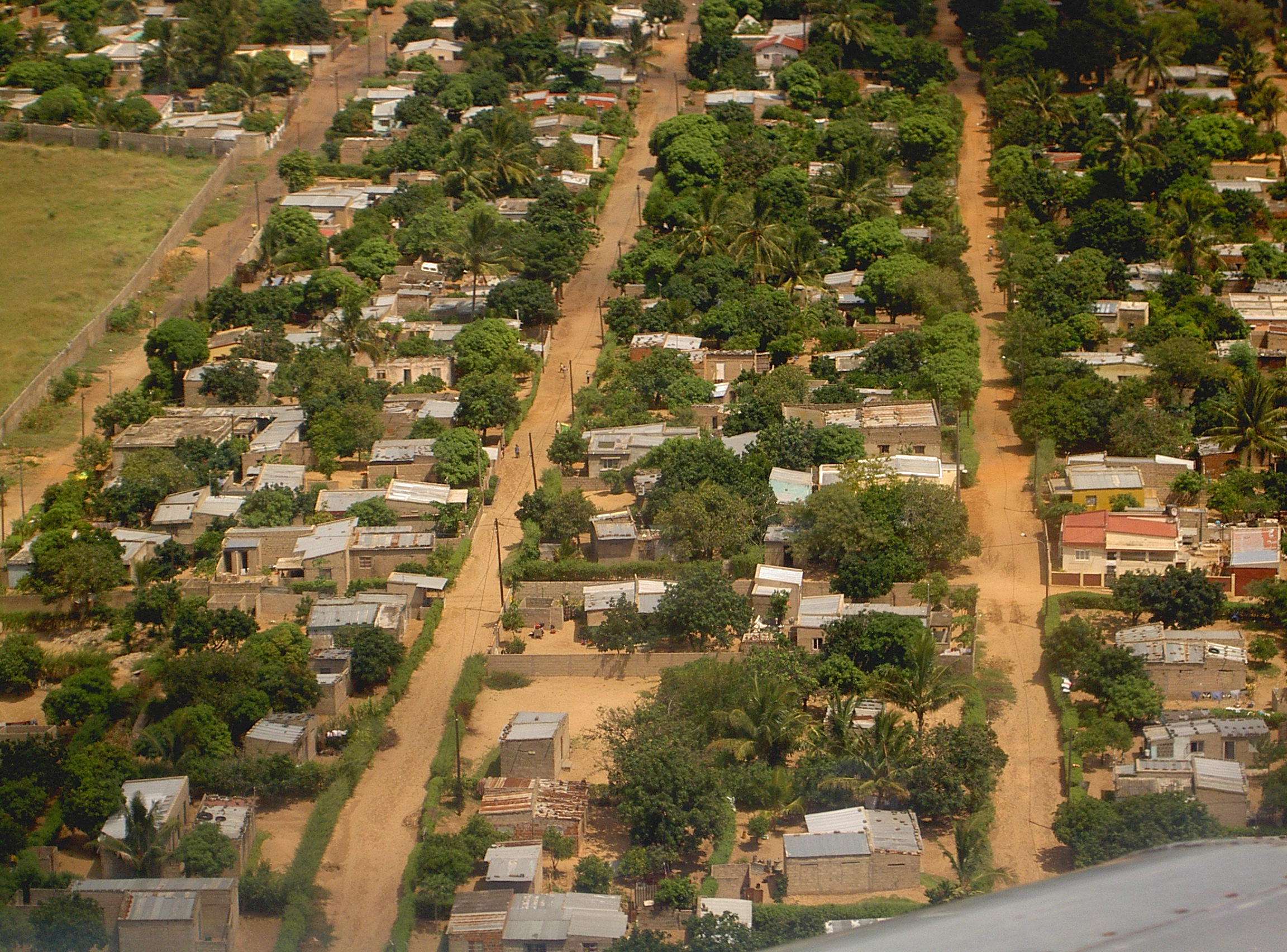
Houses in the outskirts of Maputo.

Because of the poor condition of the networks, illegal connections and vandalism of meters, unaccounted-for water (UfW) was over 50 percent in most areas in 2007. In Maputo, unaccounted-for water apparently increased substantially during the lease contract with AdeM from an estimated 38 percent in 2002 to 62 percent in 2005.

Collection efficiency, the share of bills actually paid, reached only 64% in 2004, up from about 30 percent before the lease contract, but far short from the contractual target of 87 percent for 2004. However, these figures are far from precise, and other estimates speak 60 percent UfW and 60 percent collection efficiency before in the late 1990s before the lease contract for Maputo.

According to a World Bank study, staff productivity in Maputo (5.4 employees per 1000 connections) compared favorably with large water companies in the Africa region. Staffing ratios were still high in the other areas, but were improving as the number of connections increased. In 1998 the number of staff per 1000 connections ranged from 10 in Maputo to up to 34 in some towns.

== External cooperation ==
The main donors in the water and sanitation sector are the African Development Bank, Switzerland, the Netherlands, UNICEF and the United States. Switzerland and the United States are focused on the Northern Provinces. Other donors in the water and sanitation sector include Austria, Canada, the European Commission, France, Ireland, Italy, Japan and the UK. The World Bank and Sweden are active in water resources management. Overall, about 15 donors are engaged in water supply and sanitation in Mozambique. Donor coordination is most advanced in rural areas, where Canada, the Netherlands, UNICEF, Switzerland, the UK and the African Development Bank together with the government pooled their financial resources in a Common Fund.

=== African Development Bank ===
The African Development Bank (AfDB) supported the water and sanitation sector with four investments projects since 1981. It provided US$19.6M of co-financing for the World Bank-led second national water supply project. In April 2009 it approved the Niassa Provincial Towns Water and Sanitation Project in Cuamba and Lichinga towns, supported by a US$27 million loan.

In 2010 it approved a 28m Euro combined grant and loan to support rural water supply and sanitation in Nampula and Zambezia Province. Parts of the funds are channeled through the common fund established by the government for rural water supply and sanitation, while another part is channeled outside of the common fund.

=== Canada ===
Since 2000 Canadian CIDA supports the Inhambane Rural Water Development Program (IRWDP).

=== The Netherlands ===
The Netherlands has committed a total of 17 water projects for Mozambique in the period 2005–11. The largest commitment was 18.6m Euro for a Maputo water project in joint funding with the EIB, the EU water facility and the French Development Agency in 2007. The second-largest commitment was 15m Euro for a water project in the city of Chimoio in Manica Province in 2009. More than 8m Euro were approved in 2008 to support the activities of the public Dutch water company Vitens in four cities (see further above under history). The Netherlands also provided US$10m of co-financing for the World Bank-led second national water supply project.

=== Switzerland ===
Since 1979, Switzerland is backing governmental efforts in the fields of rural water supply in the Northern provinces, training (training institutions, scholarships, human resource department) and institutional support to central and provincial authorities. The Swiss program was revised in 2003 to focus more on promoting, documenting and disseminating innovative experiences and bring them to the national debate in partnership with other donors such as the World Bank and the European Union. The main focus will remain the rural population of Northern Mozambique. Swiss aid is partially channeled through NGOs such as Helvetas in Cabo Delgado Province, CARE in Nampula and Cabo Delgado provinces, and WaterAid in Niassa and Zambezia provinces. The Swiss aid budget for water and in Mozambique is about US$3M per year.

=== UNICEF ===
UNICEF carried out a 40 million Euro Water Supply, Sanitation and Hygiene (WASH) program from 2007–2011 in the provinces Gaza, Zambezia, Manica, Sofala and Tete. The program had four components. The policy and planning component supported the establishment of strategic plans at the provincial, district and municipal level in four provinces as well as the creation of data banks for water and sanitation, as well as capacity building in seven (unnamed) "model districts".

The rural component aimed to provide at least 500,000 new users in rural areas with access to "safe drinking water facilities" and "440,000 new users with access to improved latrines". The urban component was supposed to "develop the capacity of local stakeholders for adequate planning and implementation of decentralised WASH interventions", as well as "stimulation of demand for improved WASH services" and hygiene promotion, providing "at least 100,000 new users in poor urban and peri-urban with access to safe drinking water facilities in six targeted municipalities" and "100,000 new users with access to improved latrines".

The school component provided "technical and financial assistance for the provision of child-friendly water, sanitation (separate for girls and boys) and hand washing facilities in 220 schools." A 45 million Euro follow-up project continued to support activities in the provinces Gaza, Manica, Sofala and Zambézia, with new activities in the provinces Cabo Delgado and Nampula.

=== The United States ===
In 2007 the Millennium Challenge Corporation approved a US$203.6 mn Water Supply and Sanitation Project for six cities, two mid-sized towns and 600 villages. The project is part of a larger programme covering the three Northern Provinces Zambézia, Nampula and Cabo Delgado. The program also includes road construction, farmer income support and land tenure services.

=== The World Bank ===
In 2012 the World Bank approved a US$50m loan to "strengthen the management of national water resources and increase the yield from Corumana dam to augment water supply for the Greater Maputo Metropolitan Area."

The Water Services and Institutional Support Project, a US$30M project approved in 2007, aims to increase water service coverage in the cities of Beira, Nampula, Quelimane, and Pemba and to establish an institutional and regulatory framework for water supply in smaller cities and towns. The World Bank was closely involved in the promotion of private sector participation in urban water supply through two projects. The first project (1998–2006) supported building capacity, rural water supply, water resources management, and the preparation of a new urban water supply strategy through a US$36m credit. This strategy, implemented during the second water project (2004–2009), supported large-scale civil works for urban water supply systems in five cities – Maputo (the capital), Beira, Quelimane, Nampula and Pemba through a US$75m credit.

The Mozambique Water Private Sector Contracts project is an Output based aid project supported by a US$6m grant approved in 2007. It aims to provide subsidized water connections for domestic consumers in Maputo, Beira, Nampula, Quelimane, and Pemba. The project is implemented by FIPAG and expects to subsidize the construction of more than 30,000 shared yard taps which would impact approximately 468,000 people.

Green Climate Fund

Climate resilient coastal communities

=== Other donors ===
- The Nordic Development Fund provided co-financing for the first World Bank project.
