= Dirk Ahrens =

German biologist and taxonomist

- Dirk Ahrens
- Born: 1971 (age 54–55); Neubrandenburg, East Germany
- Education: University of Greifswald; Free University of Berlin
- Known for: Research on scarab beetles; description of new species
- Scientific career
- Fields: Biology, taxonomy, entomology
- Workplaces: Museum Koenig

Dirk Ahrens (born 1971) is a German biologist and taxonomist at the Museum Koenig (Zoological Research Museum Alexander Koenig) in Bonn, Germany. He specializes in scarab beetles (Scarabaeidae) and became curator of the museum's Coleoptera section on 1 May 2010.

== Biography ==
Ahrens studied biology at the University of Greifswald, specializing in zoology and ecology. He graduated with a diploma in 1997 and subsequently worked as a research associate at the State Museum of Zoology in Dresden.

From 2001 to 2004, he pursued doctoral research at the German Entomological Institute in Eberswalde, receiving his doctoral degree from the Free University of Berlin. In 2005, he worked for Helvetas, a Swiss development cooperation organization. From 2006 to 2008, he was a postdoctoral researcher at the Natural History Museum in Munich. In 2010, he joined the Zoological Research Museum Alexander Koenig in Bonn.

His research interests include the molecular systematics of beetles, evolutionary biology, and integrative taxonomy. According to the museum's 2010 annual report, his scientific publications had described nearly 500 new species.

== Selected publications ==
Ahrens has published monographs, book chapters, and scientific journal articles. A publication list is available on the museum's website.

- Timmermans, M. J. T. N.; Dodsworth, S.; Culverwell, C. L.; Bocak, L.; Ahrens, D.; Littlewood, D. T. J.; Pons, J.; Vogler, A. P. (2010). "Why barcode? High-throughput multiplex sequencing of mitochondrial genomes for molecular systematics". Nucleic Acids Research, pp. 1–14.
- Keith, D.; Rössner, E.; Ahrens, D. (2010). "Zur Identität von Triodontella alni (Blanchard, 1850) und Serica luteipes Fairmaire, 1881 (Coleoptera: Scarabaeidae, Sericini)". Entomologische Zeitschrift, 120, pp. 103–107.
- Rössner, E.; Scheuern, J.; Ahrens, D. (2010). "Onthophagus (Palaeonthophagus) medius (Kugelann, 1792)—a good western Palaearctic species in the Onthophagus vacca complex (Coleoptera: Scarabaeidae: Scarabaeinae: Onthophagini)". Zootaxa, 2629, pp. 1–28.
- Ahrens, D.; Gc, Y. D.; Lago, P. K.; Nagel, P. (2009). "Seasonal fluctuation, phenology and turnover of chafer assemblages—insight into the structural plasticity of insect communities in tropical farmland (Coleoptera: Scarabaeidae)". Agricultural and Forest Entomology, 11, pp. 265–274.
- Ahrens, D.; Fabrizi, S. (2009). "New species of Sericini from the Eastern Himalaya and Tibet (Coleoptera, Scarabaeidae)". In: Hartmann, M.; Weipert, M. (eds.), Biodiversity and Natural Heritage of the Himalaya III. Verein der Freunde und Förderer des Naturkundemuseums Erfurt e.V., Erfurt, pp. 249–284.
- Ahrens, D. (2006). "Sericinae". In: Löbl, I.; Smetana, A. (eds.), Catalogue of the Palaearctic Coleoptera. Apollo Books, pp. 229–248.
- Ahrens, D. (2005). A taxonomic review on the Serica (s. str.) MacLeay, 1819 species of Asiatic mainland (Coleoptera, Scarabaeidae, Sericini). Nova Supplementa Entomologica, 18, pp. 1–163.
- Rössner, E.; Ahrens, D. (2004). Taxonomie und Chorologie der Gattung Omaloplia, Schoenherr, 1817 (Insecta, Coleoptera, Melolonthidae, Sericini). dissertation.de, Berlin.
- Ahrens, D.; Assing, V.; Bellmann, A.; Bellstedt, R.; Eisinger, D.; Esser, J.; Frank, J.; Geider, R.; Gürlich, S.; Hartmann, M.; Klausnitzer, B.; Klinger, R.; Köhler, F.; Konzelmann, E.; Möller, G.; Schmidt, L.; Schnitter, P.; Spitzenberg, D.; Sprick, P.; Terlutter, H. (1998). Verzeichnis der Käfer Deutschlands – Entomofauna Germanica. Entomologische Nachrichten und Berichte, Supplement 4, Dresden.
