= Triodontella lajonquierei =

Scientific classification
- Kingdom: Animalia
- Phylum: Arthropoda
- Clade: Pancrustacea
- Class: Insecta
- Order: Coleoptera
- Suborder: Polyphaga
- Infraorder: Scarabaeiformia
- Family: Scarabaeidae
- Genus: Triodontella
- Species: T. lajonquierei

Binomial name
- Triodontella lajonquierei (Baraud, 1961)

Synonyms
- Triodonta lajonquierei Baraud, 1961

Species of beetle

Triodontella lajonquierei is a species of beetle of the family Scarabaeidae. It is found in France, Portugal and Spain.

== Description ==
They are very similar to similar to Triodontella aquila. The head is densely punctured, but more indistinctly than in T. aquila and the pronotum has a very characteristic shape. The sides are rounded in the anterior third, but perfectly straight, not sinute, and parallel in the posterior half. The elytra have stronger punctation than T. aquila.
