= Triodontella nyssana =

Scientific classification
- Kingdom: Animalia
- Phylum: Arthropoda
- Clade: Pancrustacea
- Class: Insecta
- Order: Coleoptera
- Suborder: Polyphaga
- Infraorder: Scarabaeiformia
- Family: Scarabaeidae
- Genus: Triodontella
- Species: T. nyssana

Binomial name
- Triodontella nyssana (Brenske, 1901)

Synonyms
- Triodonta nyssana Brenske, 1901

Species of beetle

Triodontella nyssana is a species of beetle of the family Scarabaeidae. It is found in Malawi.

== Description ==
Adults reach a length of about 6 mm. The frons is strongly punctate and covered with appressed pubescence. The pronotum is similar to that of Triodontella ikuthana, but uniformly yellowish. The elytra are uniformly densely punctate, with short, appressed pubescence. The suture and three ribs are less prominent.
