= Triodontella rhodesiana =

Scientific classification
- Kingdom: Animalia
- Phylum: Arthropoda
- Clade: Pancrustacea
- Class: Insecta
- Order: Coleoptera
- Suborder: Polyphaga
- Infraorder: Scarabaeiformia
- Family: Scarabaeidae
- Genus: Triodontella
- Species: T. rhodesiana

Binomial name
- Triodontella rhodesiana (Péringuey, 1904)

Synonyms
- Euronycha rhodesiana Péringuey, 1904

Species of beetle

Triodontella rhodesiana is a species of beetle of the family Scarabaeidae. It is found in Zimbabwe.

== Description ==
Adults reach a length of about 4-4.75 mm. They are slightly smaller than Triodontella sericans, but the shape is the same, the appressed pubescence however, is still more silky, and the head and abdomen are infuscate.
