= Triodontella abyssinica =

Scientific classification
- Kingdom: Animalia
- Phylum: Arthropoda
- Clade: Pancrustacea
- Class: Insecta
- Order: Coleoptera
- Suborder: Polyphaga
- Infraorder: Scarabaeiformia
- Family: Scarabaeidae
- Genus: Triodontella
- Species: T. abyssinica

Binomial name
- Triodontella abyssinica (Brenske, 1901)

Synonyms
- Triodonta abyssinica Brenske, 1901

Species of beetle

Triodontella abyssinica is a species of beetle of the family Scarabaeidae. It is found in Ethiopia.

== Description ==
Adults reach a length of about 5.5 mm. They are small, shiny and yellow. They are very similar to Triodontella brevis, but differing in its more extensive punctation and associated thinner pubescence. The elytra are granularly punctate with very faint striae.
