= Triodontella castiliana =

Scientific classification
- Kingdom: Animalia
- Phylum: Arthropoda
- Clade: Pancrustacea
- Class: Insecta
- Order: Coleoptera
- Suborder: Polyphaga
- Infraorder: Scarabaeiformia
- Family: Scarabaeidae
- Genus: Triodontella
- Species: T. castiliana

Binomial name
- Triodontella castiliana (Baraud, 1961)

Synonyms
- Triodonta castiliana Baraud, 1961

Species of beetle

Triodontella castiliana is a species of beetle of the family Scarabaeidae. It is found in Portugal and Spain.

== Description ==
Adults reach a length of about 8–10 mm. The body is entirely brown, somewhat dark, not very shiny and covered with a light, fine pubescence. The head is identical to that of Triodontella aquila, but the punctation is coarse and more widely spaced in places. The pronotum is covered with larger and denser punctation than in T. aquila. The punctation on the elytra is slightly finer than that of the pronotum and the striae and interstriae are barely visible.
