= Triodontella sansibarica =

Scientific classification
- Kingdom: Animalia
- Phylum: Arthropoda
- Clade: Pancrustacea
- Class: Insecta
- Order: Coleoptera
- Suborder: Polyphaga
- Infraorder: Scarabaeiformia
- Family: Scarabaeidae
- Genus: Triodontella
- Species: T. sansibarica

Binomial name
- Triodontella sansibarica (Brenske, 1896)

Synonyms
- Triodonta sansibarica Brenske, 1896

Species of beetle

Triodontella sansibarica is a species of beetle of the family Scarabaeidae. It is found in Tanzania.

== Description ==
Adults reach a length of about 5 mm. They are similar to Triodontella nitidula, but overall more sparsely pubescent. They are yellowish, with the abdomen and lateral margins of the elytra somewhat darker. The clypeus is tapered, distinctly emarginate anteriorly, densely, finely wrinkled-punctate. The frons is granularly punctate and sparsely covered with greyish pubescence. The pronotum is very finely punctate and sparsely pubescent. The elytra are also sparsely pubescent. The pygidium is somewhat convex and the hairs are more robust.
