= Triodontella mimula =

Scientific classification
- Kingdom: Animalia
- Phylum: Arthropoda
- Clade: Pancrustacea
- Class: Insecta
- Order: Coleoptera
- Suborder: Polyphaga
- Infraorder: Scarabaeiformia
- Family: Scarabaeidae
- Genus: Triodontella
- Species: T. mimula

Binomial name
- Triodontella mimula Leo & Fancello, 2007

Species of beetle

Triodontella mimula is a species of beetle of the family Scarabaeidae. It is found in Italy (Sardinia).

== Description ==
Adults reach a length of about 6.5–9.5 mm. They are uniformly reddish, covered with fine yellowish-white hairs.

== Etymology ==
The name of the species is derived from Latin mima-ae (meaning little mime or little comedian) and refers to the remarkable correspondence of the external morphological characteristics with the related species Triodontella raymondi.
