= Triodontella sardoa =

Scientific classification
- Kingdom: Animalia
- Phylum: Arthropoda
- Clade: Pancrustacea
- Class: Insecta
- Order: Coleoptera
- Suborder: Polyphaga
- Infraorder: Scarabaeiformia
- Family: Scarabaeidae
- Genus: Triodontella
- Species: T. sardoa

Binomial name
- Triodontella sardoa (Baraud, 1962)

Synonyms
- Triodonta sardoa Baraud, 1962

Species of beetle

Triodontella sardoa is a species of beetle of the family Scarabaeidae. It is found in Italy (Sardinia).

== Description ==
Adults reach a length of about 8.5 mm. The body is entirely brown, not very shiny and covered with fine, light, short pubescence. The head is similar to that of Triodontella cribellata, but the pronotum is more finely and densely punctate. The elytra are also similar to those of T. cribellata.
