= Triodontella ferruginea =

Scientific classification
- Kingdom: Animalia
- Phylum: Arthropoda
- Clade: Pancrustacea
- Class: Insecta
- Order: Coleoptera
- Suborder: Polyphaga
- Infraorder: Scarabaeiformia
- Family: Scarabaeidae
- Genus: Triodontella
- Species: T. ferruginea

Binomial name
- Triodontella ferruginea (Moser, 1924)

Synonyms
- Triodonta ferruginea Moser, 1924

Species of beetle

Triodontella ferruginea is a species of beetle of the family Scarabaeidae. It is found in Tanzania.

== Description ==
Adults reach a length of about 5.5 mm. They are ferruginous and shiny, with yellow hairs. The antennae are tawny.
