= Triodontella tunisia =

Scientific classification
- Kingdom: Animalia
- Phylum: Arthropoda
- Clade: Pancrustacea
- Class: Insecta
- Order: Coleoptera
- Suborder: Polyphaga
- Infraorder: Scarabaeiformia
- Family: Scarabaeidae
- Genus: Triodontella
- Species: T. tunisia

Binomial name
- Triodontella tunisia (Brenske, 1890)

Synonyms
- Triodonta tunisia Brenske, 1890

Species of beetle

Triodontella tunisia is a species of beetle of the family Scarabaeidae. It is found in Tunisia.

== Description ==
Adults reach a length of about 5 mm. The elytra lack long cilia at the sutural angle. The elytra are weakly striated, with raised, alternate interstriae. The lateral margin of the pronotum is weakly sinuate before the base.
