= Triodontella =

Scientific classification
- Kingdom: Animalia
- Phylum: Arthropoda
- Clade: Pancrustacea
- Class: Insecta
- Order: Coleoptera
- Suborder: Polyphaga
- Infraorder: Scarabaeiformia
- Family: Scarabaeidae
- Subfamily: Sericinae
- Tribe: Sericini
- Genus: Triodontella; Reitter, 1919

Synonyms
- Euronycha Péringuey, 1904; Triodonta Mulsant, 1842

Genus of leaf beetles

Triodontella is a genus of beetles belonging to the family Scarabaeidae.

== Species ==
- Triodontella aberrans (Gerstaecker, 1867)
- Triodontella abyssinica (Brenske, 1901)
- Triodontella alni (Blanchard, 1850)
- Triodontella alternata (Arrow, 1925)
- Triodontella angusticrus (Moser, 1917)
- Triodontella aquila (Laporte, 1840)
- Triodontella asiatica (Brenske, 1890)
- Triodontella boromensis (Brancsik, 1897)
- Triodontella brevis (Brenske, 1890)
- Triodontella brunneipennis (Sahlberg, 1908)
- Triodontella bucculenta (Baraud, 1962)
- Triodontella burgeoni (Moser, 1926)
- Triodontella calva (Burgeon, 1947)
- Triodontella castiliana (Baraud, 1961)
- Triodontella colini (Moser, 1917)
- Triodontella congoana (Moser, 1924)
- Triodontella corsica (Baraud & Schaefer, 1959)
- Triodontella costipennis (Fairmaire, 1901)
- Triodontella cribellata (Fairmaire, 1859)
- Triodontella dalmatica (Baraud, 1962)
- Triodontella demelti (Petrovitz, 1963)
- Triodontella difformipes (Fairmaire, 1892)
- Triodontella dispar (Fairmaire, 1892)
- Triodontella dorsalis (Arrow, 1925)
- Triodontella eggeri (Rey, 1999)
- Triodontella ferruginea (Moser, 1924)
- Triodontella flavimana (Burmeister, 1855)
- Triodontella flavipennis (Moser, 1924)
- Triodontella flavofusca (Kolbe, 1891)
- Triodontella gerardi (Burgeon, 1947)
- Triodontella hovana (Fairmaire, 1897)
- Triodontella ikuthana (Brenske, 1901)
- Triodontella judaica (Blanchard, 1850)
- Triodontella lajonquierei (Baraud, 1961)
- Triodontella lateristria (Reitter, 1889)
- Triodontella leonina (Arrow, 1925)
- Triodontella lineolata (Brancsik, 1897)
- Triodontella lujai (Moser, 1917)
- Triodontella luluensis (Burgeon, 1947)
- Triodontella massarti (Burgeon, 1947)
- Triodontella meruana (Kolbe, 1910)
- Triodontella mimula Leo & Fancello, 2007
- Triodontella modesta (Péringuey, 1892)
- Triodontella murina (Moser, 1924)
- Triodontella nigripennis (Moser, 1926)
- Triodontella nitidula (Rossi, 1790)
- Triodontella nyssana (Brenske, 1901)
- Triodontella overlaeti (Burgeon, 1947)
- Triodontella preissi Keith, 2001
- Triodontella procera (Lansberge, 1886)
- Triodontella raymondi (Perris, 1869)
- Triodontella reitteri (Brenske, 1890)
- Triodontella rhodesiana (Péringuey, 1904)
- Triodontella robusta (Arrow, 1925)
- Triodontella rufina (Kolbe, 1897)
- Triodontella ruizi (Pérez-López & Hernández-Ruiz, 1994)
- Triodontella sansibarica (Brenske, 1896)
- Triodontella sardoa (Baraud, 1962)
- Triodontella schoutedeni (Burgeon, 1947)
- Triodontella sebakuana (Péringuey, 1904)
- Triodontella sericans (Fåhraeus, 1857)
- Triodontella seydeli (Burgeon, 1947)
- Triodontella signaticollis (Moser, 1924)
- Triodontella tarsalis (Blanchard, 1850)
- Triodontella tinanti (Burgeon, 1947)
- Triodontella truncata (Blanchard, 1850)
- Triodontella tunisia (Brenske, 1890)
- Triodontella uhana (Moser, 1924)
- Triodontella zuzartei (Branco, 1978)
