= Triodontella eggeri =

Scientific classification
- Kingdom: Animalia
- Phylum: Arthropoda
- Clade: Pancrustacea
- Class: Insecta
- Order: Coleoptera
- Suborder: Polyphaga
- Infraorder: Scarabaeiformia
- Family: Scarabaeidae
- Genus: Triodontella
- Species: T. eggeri

Binomial name
- Triodontella eggeri (Rey, 1999)

Synonyms
- Triodonta eggeri Rey, 1999

Species of beetle

Triodontella eggeri is a species of beetle of the family Scarabaeidae. It is found in south-western Turkey.

== Description ==
Adults reach a length of about 6.2–6.5 mm. They are brown-testaceous. The pronotum is almost rectangular, with the anterior and posterior margins sinuated at the sides and covered with long hairs. The elytra are without distinct transverse striae and are uniformly covered with short yellow hairs.
