= Triodontella aberrans =

Scientific classification
- Kingdom: Animalia
- Phylum: Arthropoda
- Clade: Pancrustacea
- Class: Insecta
- Order: Coleoptera
- Suborder: Polyphaga
- Infraorder: Scarabaeiformia
- Family: Scarabaeidae
- Genus: Triodontella
- Species: T. aberrans

Binomial name
- Triodontella aberrans (Gerstaecker, 1867)

Synonyms
- Serica aberrans Gerstaecker, 1867

Species of beetle

Triodontella aberrans is a species of beetle of the family Scarabaeidae. It is found in Tanzania.
