= Triodontella flavofusca =

Scientific classification
- Kingdom: Animalia
- Phylum: Arthropoda
- Clade: Pancrustacea
- Class: Insecta
- Order: Coleoptera
- Suborder: Polyphaga
- Infraorder: Scarabaeiformia
- Family: Scarabaeidae
- Genus: Triodontella
- Species: T. flavofusca

Binomial name
- Triodontella flavofusca (Kolbe, 1891)

Synonyms
- Homaloplia flavofusca Kolbe, 1891

Species of beetle

Triodontella flavofusca is a species of beetle of the family Scarabaeidae. It is found in Tanzania.

== Description ==
Adults reach a length of about 4.5 mm (0.18 in). They are yellowish-brown, with greyish hairs. The antennae are black-brown, while the club is testaceous-yellow.
