= Triodontella reitteri =

Scientific classification
- Kingdom: Animalia
- Phylum: Arthropoda
- Clade: Pancrustacea
- Class: Insecta
- Order: Coleoptera
- Suborder: Polyphaga
- Infraorder: Scarabaeiformia
- Family: Scarabaeidae
- Genus: Triodontella
- Species: T. reitteri

Binomial name
- Triodontella reitteri (Brenske, 1890)

Synonyms
- Triodonta reitteri Brenske, 1890

Species of beetle

Triodontella reitteri is a species of beetle of the family Scarabaeidae. It is found in Algeria.

== Description ==
Adults reach a length of about 5–6 mm. They are brown, with a reddish-brown clypeus, a black pronotal disc and a black frons. The pubescence is fine and pale. The head has very strong and dense punctation. The pronotum has strong, fairly dense punctation. The pubescence is light and short, with a few long cilia on the lateral and anterior margins. The punctation on the elytra is strong and rough, converging into transverse ridges. The striae and interstriae are rather strong and distinct.
