= Triodontella lateristria =

Scientific classification
- Kingdom: Animalia
- Phylum: Arthropoda
- Clade: Pancrustacea
- Class: Insecta
- Order: Coleoptera
- Suborder: Polyphaga
- Infraorder: Scarabaeiformia
- Family: Scarabaeidae
- Genus: Triodontella
- Species: T. lateristria

Binomial name
- Triodontella lateristria (Reitter, 1889)

Synonyms
- Triodonta lateristria Reitter, 1889

Species of beetle

Triodontella lateristria is a species of beetle of the family Scarabaeidae. It is found in Turkey.

== Description ==
Adults reach a length of about 5.5–7 mm. They are yellowish-brown with a black frons. The clypeus has a reddish edge and the legs are pale. They are covered with fine, pale pubescence.
