= Triodontella brunneipennis =

Scientific classification
- Kingdom: Animalia
- Phylum: Arthropoda
- Clade: Pancrustacea
- Class: Insecta
- Order: Coleoptera
- Suborder: Polyphaga
- Infraorder: Scarabaeiformia
- Family: Scarabaeidae
- Genus: Triodontella
- Species: T. brunneipennis

Binomial name
- Triodontella brunneipennis (Sahlberg, 1908)

Synonyms
- Triodonta brunneipennis Sahlberg, 1908

Species of beetle

Triodontella brunneipennis is a species of beetle of the family Scarabaeidae. It is found in Turkey.

== Description ==
Adults reach a length of about 9–10 mm. They have an elongate, pitch-black, almost opaque body, with short, fairly dense yellow pubescence. The punctation is close and quite strong. The antennae and legs are reddish-brown, and the elytra are brown and distinctly striated, with longer yellow cilia on the sides.
