= Triodontella bucculenta =

Scientific classification
- Kingdom: Animalia
- Phylum: Arthropoda
- Clade: Pancrustacea
- Class: Insecta
- Order: Coleoptera
- Suborder: Polyphaga
- Infraorder: Scarabaeiformia
- Family: Scarabaeidae
- Genus: Triodontella
- Species: T. bucculenta

Binomial name
- Triodontella bucculenta (Baraud, 1962)

Synonyms
- Triodonta bucculenta Baraud, 1962

Species of beetle

Triodontella bucculenta is a species of beetle of the family Scarabaeidae. It is found in France, Italy and Switzerland.

== Description ==
Adults reach a length of about 6.5–8 mm. The body is entirely light brown, glossy and covered with a fine, light pubescence. The head has large, close punctures. The pronotum has moderately dense, fine punctation and the sides and anterior margin have long, erect cilia. The elytra are covered with fine punctation.
