= Triodontella hovana =

Scientific classification
- Kingdom: Animalia
- Phylum: Arthropoda
- Clade: Pancrustacea
- Class: Insecta
- Order: Coleoptera
- Suborder: Polyphaga
- Infraorder: Scarabaeiformia
- Family: Scarabaeidae
- Genus: Triodontella
- Species: T. hovana

Binomial name
- Triodontella hovana (Fairmaire, 1897)

Synonyms
- Triodonta hovana Fairmaire, 1897

Species of beetle

Triodontella hovana is a species of beetle of the family Scarabaeidae. It is found in Madagascar.

== Description ==
Adults reach a length of about 5 mm. They are black and shiny, with the head densely punctate.
