= Triodontella colini =

Scientific classification
- Kingdom: Animalia
- Phylum: Arthropoda
- Clade: Pancrustacea
- Class: Insecta
- Order: Coleoptera
- Suborder: Polyphaga
- Infraorder: Scarabaeiformia
- Family: Scarabaeidae
- Genus: Triodontella
- Species: T. colini

Binomial name
- Triodontella colini (Moser, 1917)

Synonyms
- Triodonta colini Moser, 1917

Species of beetle

Triodontella colini is a species of beetle of the family Scarabaeidae. It is found in Cameroon.

== Description ==
Adults reach a length of about 7 mm. They are lighter or darker brown, with the pronotum more or less darkened in the middle, as is the posterior part of the frons, while the anterior part of the frons and the clypeus are red. The head is punctate and the frons is pubescent. The antennae are yellow. The pronotum is densely punctate and the elytra have rows of punctures, the intervals densely covered with punctures.
