= Triodontella difformipes =

Scientific classification
- Kingdom: Animalia
- Phylum: Arthropoda
- Clade: Pancrustacea
- Class: Insecta
- Order: Coleoptera
- Suborder: Polyphaga
- Infraorder: Scarabaeiformia
- Family: Scarabaeidae
- Genus: Triodontella
- Species: T. difformipes

Binomial name
- Triodontella difformipes (Fairmaire, 1892)

Synonyms
- Triodonta difformipes Fairmaire, 1892; Triodonta brignolii Sabatinelli, 1977

Species of beetle

Triodontella difformipes is a species of beetle of the family Scarabaeidae. It is found in Syria and Turkey.

== Description ==
Adults reach a length of about 6.2 mm. The prothorax and elytra are light brown, while the head is black. The integuments are covered with fine, short yellow hairs. The internal sutural angle of the elytra is covered with long hairs, similar to those on the epipleural margin.
