= Triodontella flavimana =

Scientific classification
- Kingdom: Animalia
- Phylum: Arthropoda
- Clade: Pancrustacea
- Class: Insecta
- Order: Coleoptera
- Suborder: Polyphaga
- Infraorder: Scarabaeiformia
- Family: Scarabaeidae
- Genus: Triodontella
- Species: T. flavimana

Binomial name
- Triodontella flavimana (Burmeister, 1855)

Synonyms
- Triodonta flavimana Burmeister, 1855; Triodonta flavimana melanoptera Baraud, 1962; Triodonta sieversi Reitter, 1889

Species of beetle

Triodontella flavimana is a species of beetle of the family Scarabaeidae. It is found in Georgia, Turkey and Syria.

== Description ==
Adults reach a length of about 6–7.5 mm. The head, pronotum, scutellum, pygidium and underside are black, while the antennae are pale testaceous. The elytra are yellowish-brown, with the suture and outer margin black. The pubescence is pale and fine. Sometimes the pronotum is lightened on the sides.
