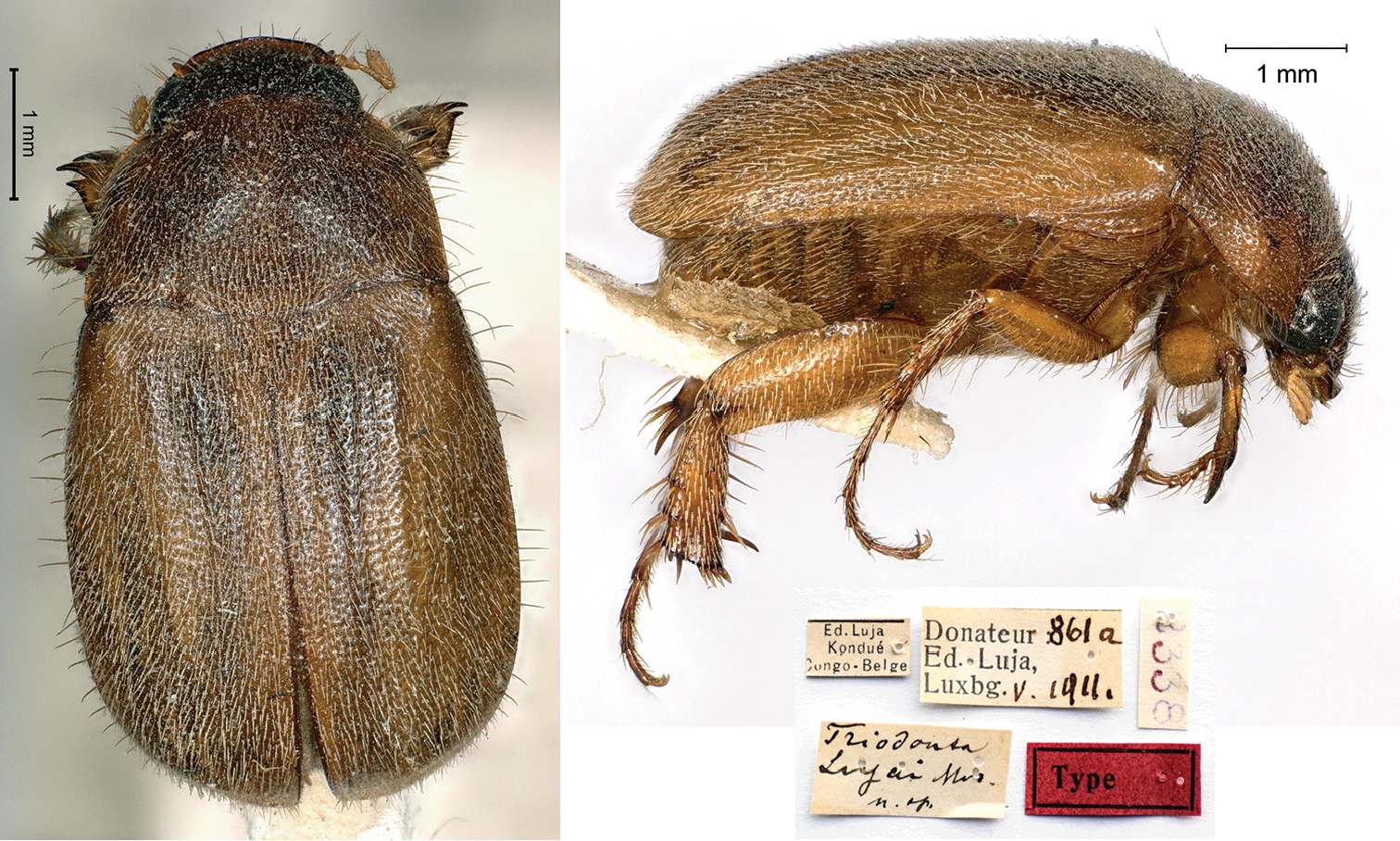

Scientific classification
- Kingdom: Animalia
- Phylum: Arthropoda
- Clade: Pancrustacea
- Class: Insecta
- Order: Coleoptera
- Suborder: Polyphaga
- Infraorder: Scarabaeiformia
- Family: Scarabaeidae
- Genus: Triodontella
- Species: T. lujai

Binomial name
- Triodontella lujai (Moser, 1917)

Synonyms
- Triodonta lujai Moser, 1917

= Triodontella lujai =

Species of beetle

Triodontella lujai is a species of beetle of the family Scarabaeidae. It is found in the Democratic Republic of the Congo.

== Description ==
Adults reach a length of about 5.5–7 mm. They are yellowish-brown, with yellowish hairs. The pronotum is darkened except for the lateral margins and the head is punctured with setae. The antennae are brown. The pronotum is densely punctate and the elytra have rows of punctures. The elytral intervals, the pygidium, and the underside are densely punctate.
