= Triodontella lineolata =

Scientific classification
- Kingdom: Animalia
- Phylum: Arthropoda
- Clade: Pancrustacea
- Class: Insecta
- Order: Coleoptera
- Suborder: Polyphaga
- Infraorder: Scarabaeiformia
- Family: Scarabaeidae
- Genus: Triodontella
- Species: T. lineolata

Binomial name
- Triodontella lineolata (Brancsik, 1897)

Synonyms
- Triodonta lineolata Brancsik, 1897

Species of beetle

Triodontella lineolata is a species of beetle of the family Scarabaeidae. It is found in Africa, where it was recorded from Boroma, on the Zambesi River.

== Description ==
Adults reach a length of about 5.5–6 mm. They have a rufo-testaceous, closely punctate, pubescent, ovate body. The pubescence is slightly ochraceous and greyish.
