= Triodontella boromensis =

Scientific classification
- Kingdom: Animalia
- Phylum: Arthropoda
- Clade: Pancrustacea
- Class: Insecta
- Order: Coleoptera
- Suborder: Polyphaga
- Infraorder: Scarabaeiformia
- Family: Scarabaeidae
- Genus: Triodontella
- Species: T. boromensis

Binomial name
- Triodontella boromensis (Brancsik, 1897)

Synonyms
- Triodonta boromensis Brancsik, 1897

Species of beetle

Triodontella boromensis is a species of beetle of the family Scarabaeidae. It is found in Africa, where it was recorded from Boroma, on the Zambesi River.

== Description ==
Adults reach a length of about 6.5–7.5 mm. They have a rufo-testaceous, closely punctate, elongated body. They are clothed all over with a thin greyish-ochraceous pubescence and the margin of the thorax and elytra is ciliate. The antennae are testaceous.
