= Triodontella sebakuana =

Scientific classification
- Kingdom: Animalia
- Phylum: Arthropoda
- Clade: Pancrustacea
- Class: Insecta
- Order: Coleoptera
- Suborder: Polyphaga
- Infraorder: Scarabaeiformia
- Family: Scarabaeidae
- Genus: Triodontella
- Species: T. sebakuana

Binomial name
- Triodontella sebakuana (Péringuey, 1904)

Synonyms
- Euronycha sebakuana Péringuey, 1904

Species of beetle

Triodontella sebakuana is a species of beetle of the family Scarabaeidae. It is found in Zimbabwe.

== Description ==
Adults reach a length of about 6-6.5 mm. They are fuscous brown or light chestnut-red.
