= Triodontella burgeoni =

Scientific classification
- Kingdom: Animalia
- Phylum: Arthropoda
- Clade: Pancrustacea
- Class: Insecta
- Order: Coleoptera
- Suborder: Polyphaga
- Infraorder: Scarabaeiformia
- Family: Scarabaeidae
- Genus: Triodontella
- Species: T. burgeoni

Binomial name
- Triodontella burgeoni (Moser, 1926)

Synonyms
- Triodonta burgeoni Moser, 1926

Species of beetle

Triodontella burgeoni is a species of beetle of the family Scarabaeidae. It is found in the Democratic Republic of the Congo.

== Description ==
Adults reach a length of about 5 mm. They are black, densely covered with narrow grey scales, and more or less black-marked above. The legs are tawny. The head is densely punctate, the frons with scaly punctures. The antennae are reddish-yellow. The pronotum has four longitudinal black bands, sometimes interrupted. The elytra are grey or black.
