= Triodontella corsica =

Scientific classification
- Kingdom: Animalia
- Phylum: Arthropoda
- Clade: Pancrustacea
- Class: Insecta
- Order: Coleoptera
- Suborder: Polyphaga
- Infraorder: Scarabaeiformia
- Family: Scarabaeidae
- Genus: Triodontella
- Species: T. corsica

Binomial name
- Triodontella corsica (Baraud & Schaefer, 1959)

Synonyms
- Triodonta corsica Baraud & Schaefer, 1959

Species of beetle

Triodontella corsica is a species of beetle of the family Scarabaeidae. It is found in France (Corsica).

== Description ==
Adults reach a length of about 5–6.5 mm. They are light brown, with only the frons, the sutural and marginal regions of the elytra darkened. The pronotum, scutellum, elytra, and pygidium are covered with fine, light, short pubescence.
