= Triodontella zuzartei =

Scientific classification
- Kingdom: Animalia
- Phylum: Arthropoda
- Clade: Pancrustacea
- Class: Insecta
- Order: Coleoptera
- Suborder: Polyphaga
- Infraorder: Scarabaeiformia
- Family: Scarabaeidae
- Genus: Triodontella
- Species: T. zuzartei

Binomial name
- Triodontella zuzartei (Branco, 1978)

Synonyms
- Triodonta zuzartei Branco, 1978

Species of beetle

Triodontella zuzartei is a species of beetle of the family Scarabaeidae. It is found in the southern part of the Iberian Peninsula (Portugal and Spain).
