= Triodontella murina =

Scientific classification
- Kingdom: Animalia
- Phylum: Arthropoda
- Clade: Pancrustacea
- Class: Insecta
- Order: Coleoptera
- Suborder: Polyphaga
- Infraorder: Scarabaeiformia
- Family: Scarabaeidae
- Genus: Triodontella
- Species: T. murina

Binomial name
- Triodontella murina (Moser, 1924)

Synonyms
- Triodonta murina Moser, 1924

Species of beetle

Triodontella murina is a species of beetle of the family Scarabaeidae. It is found in the Democratic Republic of the Congo.

== Description ==
Adults reach a length of about 4.5 mm (0.18 in). They have an elongate, black, densely punctate body, covered in grey hairs and with the legs more or less dark brown. The antennae are reddish-yellow.
