= Triodontella flavipennis =

Scientific classification
- Kingdom: Animalia
- Phylum: Arthropoda
- Clade: Pancrustacea
- Class: Insecta
- Order: Coleoptera
- Suborder: Polyphaga
- Infraorder: Scarabaeiformia
- Family: Scarabaeidae
- Genus: Triodontella
- Species: T. flavipennis

Binomial name
- Triodontella flavipennis (Moser, 1924)

Synonyms
- Triodonta flavipennis Moser, 1924

Species of beetle

Triodontella flavipennis is a species of beetle of the family Scarabaeidae. It is found in Tanzania.

== Description ==
Adults reach a length of about 7 mm. They are yellow and shiny, with yellowish hairs and with the head, pronotum and scutellum dark. The antennae are yellow.
