= Triodontella signaticollis =

Scientific classification
- Kingdom: Animalia
- Phylum: Arthropoda
- Clade: Pancrustacea
- Class: Insecta
- Order: Coleoptera
- Suborder: Polyphaga
- Infraorder: Scarabaeiformia
- Family: Scarabaeidae
- Genus: Triodontella
- Species: T. signaticollis

Binomial name
- Triodontella signaticollis (Moser, 1924)

Synonyms
- Triodonta signaticollis Moser, 1924

Species of beetle

Triodontella signaticollis is a species of beetle of the family Scarabaeidae. It is found in Kenya and Tanzania.

== Description ==
Adults reach a length of about 4 mm. They are yellow with yellowish hairs and a dark spot in the middle of the pronotum. The antennae are yellow.
