= Triodontella congoana =

Scientific classification
- Kingdom: Animalia
- Phylum: Arthropoda
- Clade: Pancrustacea
- Class: Insecta
- Order: Coleoptera
- Suborder: Polyphaga
- Infraorder: Scarabaeiformia
- Family: Scarabaeidae
- Genus: Triodontella
- Species: T. congoana

Binomial name
- Triodontella congoana (Moser, 1924)

Synonyms
- Triodonta congoana Moser, 1924

Species of beetle

Triodontella congoana is a species of beetle of the family Scarabaeidae. It is found in the Democratic Republic of the Congo.

== Description ==
Adults reach a length of about 9 mm (0.35 in). They have an oblong body. They are blackish-brown above, and brown below. They are densely and finely punctate and clothed with greyish hairs. The antennae are reddish-yellow.
