= Triodontella rufina =

Scientific classification
- Kingdom: Animalia
- Phylum: Arthropoda
- Clade: Pancrustacea
- Class: Insecta
- Order: Coleoptera
- Suborder: Polyphaga
- Infraorder: Scarabaeiformia
- Family: Scarabaeidae
- Genus: Triodontella
- Species: T. rufina

Binomial name
- Triodontella rufina (Kolbe, 1897)

Synonyms
- Triodonta rufina Kolbe, 1897

Species of beetle

Triodontella rufina is a species of beetle of the family Scarabaeidae. It is found in Mozambique.

== Description ==
Adults reach a length of about 8 mm. They are reddish-testaceous, with whitish-grey hairs. The head is dark and the pronotum pale red. The abdomen and legs are brownish.
