= Triodontella nigripennis =

Scientific classification
- Kingdom: Animalia
- Phylum: Arthropoda
- Clade: Pancrustacea
- Class: Insecta
- Order: Coleoptera
- Suborder: Polyphaga
- Infraorder: Scarabaeiformia
- Family: Scarabaeidae
- Genus: Triodontella
- Species: T. nigripennis

Binomial name
- Triodontella nigripennis (Moser, 1926)

Synonyms
- Triodonta nigripennis Moser, 1926

Species of beetle

Triodontella nigripennis is a species of beetle of the family Scarabaeidae. It is found in the Democratic Republic of the Congo.

== Description ==
Adults reach a length of about 5 mm. They have an oblong-oval, yellow-red, shiny body, with black elytra. The head is densely punctate. The pronotum is moderately densely punctate and the elytra are seriate-punctate, with the interstices slightly convex and punctate.
