= Triodontella angusticrus =

Scientific classification
- Kingdom: Animalia
- Phylum: Arthropoda
- Clade: Pancrustacea
- Class: Insecta
- Order: Coleoptera
- Suborder: Polyphaga
- Infraorder: Scarabaeiformia
- Family: Scarabaeidae
- Genus: Triodontella
- Species: T. angusticrus

Binomial name
- Triodontella angusticrus (Moser, 1917)

Synonyms
- Triodonta angusticrus Moser, 1917

Species of beetle

Triodontella angusticrus is a species of beetle of the family Scarabaeidae. It is found in Tanzania.

== Description ==
Adults reach a length of about 5.5 mm. They are yellow, with yellowish hairs. The head, pronotum and scutellum are more or less reddish. The head is punctate. The frons is hairy and the antennae are yellow. The pronotum is densely punctate and the elytra have rows of punctures, the intervals covered with punctures.
