= Triodontella dispar =

Scientific classification
- Kingdom: Animalia
- Phylum: Arthropoda
- Clade: Pancrustacea
- Class: Insecta
- Order: Coleoptera
- Suborder: Polyphaga
- Infraorder: Scarabaeiformia
- Family: Scarabaeidae
- Genus: Triodontella
- Species: T. dispar

Binomial name
- Triodontella dispar (Fairmaire, 1892)

Synonyms
- Triodonta dispar Fairmaire, 1892; Triodonta difformipes delagrangei Pic, 1898

Species of beetle

Triodontella dispar is a species of beetle of the family Scarabaeidae. It is found in Syria.

== Description ==
Adults reach a length of about 5-5.5 mm. The males have an elongate-oval, black, glossy body, with small ash-yellow setae and with yellow cilia at the sides. Females are larger, with reddish-brown elytra with yellow setae. The head is black and the legs are reddish-brown.
