= Triodontella asiatica =

Scientific classification
- Kingdom: Animalia
- Phylum: Arthropoda
- Clade: Pancrustacea
- Class: Insecta
- Order: Coleoptera
- Suborder: Polyphaga
- Infraorder: Scarabaeiformia
- Family: Scarabaeidae
- Genus: Triodontella
- Species: T. asiatica

Binomial name
- Triodontella asiatica (Brenske, 1890)

Synonyms
- Triodonta asiatica Brenske, 1890

Species of beetle

Triodontella asiatica is a species of beetle of the family Scarabaeidae. It is found in Turkey.

== Description ==
Adults reach a length of about 6 mm. The elytra are yellowish-brown and striated, with the alternate interstriae raised.
