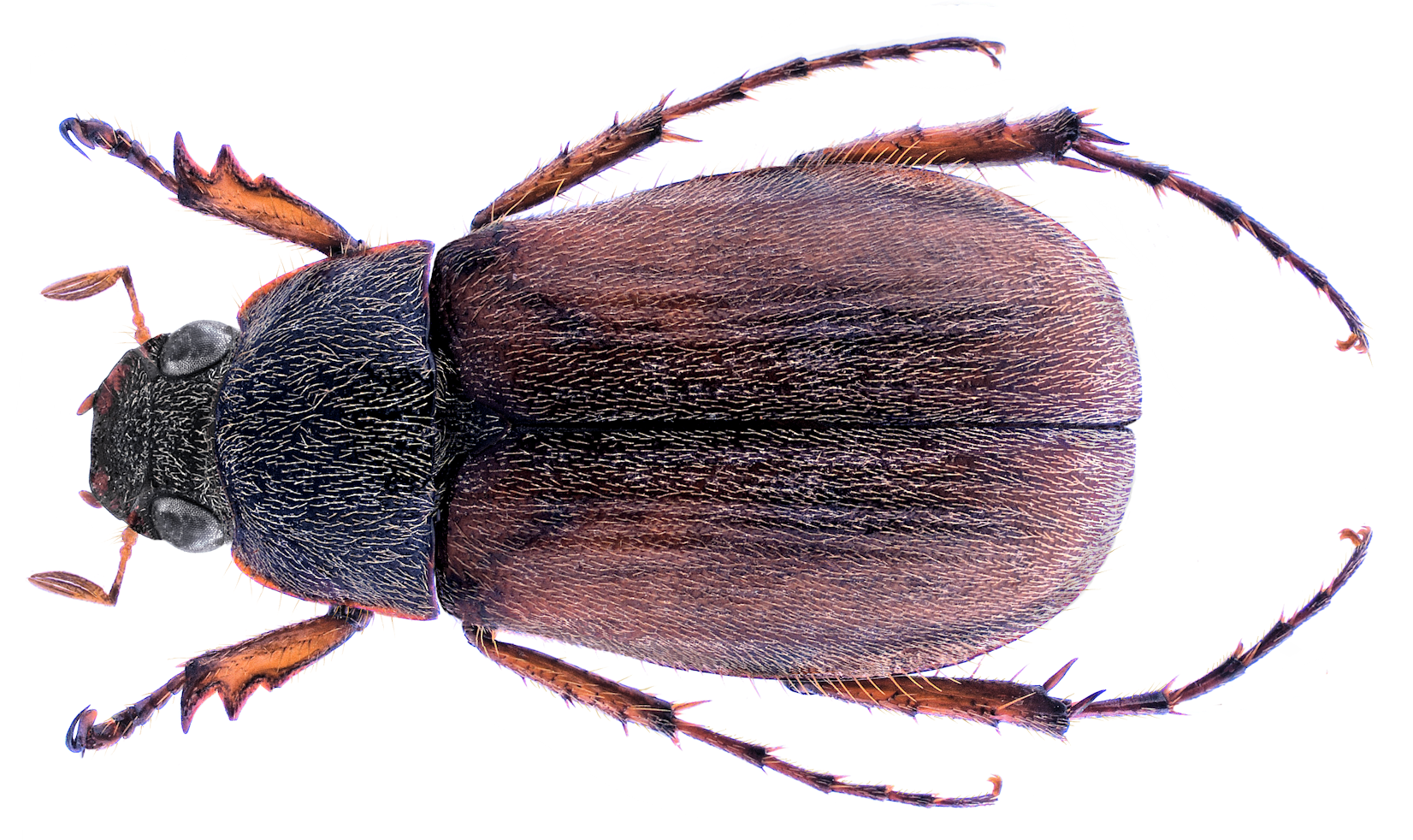

Scientific classification
- Kingdom: Animalia
- Phylum: Arthropoda
- Clade: Pancrustacea
- Class: Insecta
- Order: Coleoptera
- Suborder: Polyphaga
- Infraorder: Scarabaeiformia
- Family: Scarabaeidae
- Genus: Triodontella
- Species: T. dalmatica

Binomial name
- Triodontella dalmatica (Baraud, 1962)

Synonyms
- Triodonta dalmatica Baraud, 1962; Triodontella bulgarica Bunalski, 2001; Triodonta dalmatica bicolora Baraud, 1962; Triodonta dalmatica obscura Baraud, 1962

= Triodontella dalmatica =

Species of beetle

Triodontella dalmatica is a species of beetle of the family Scarabaeidae. It is found in Albania, Bosnia Herzegovina, Bulgaria, Croatia, Greece, Kosovo, North Macedonia, Montenegro, Romania, Serbia and Turkey.

== Description ==
Adults reach a length of about 7.5–8 mm. The body is entirely brown, but slightly darkened on the frons and pronotal disc. The pubescence is light and short. Sometimes, the head and pronotum are black and the elytra yellowish-brown with a darker suture or entirely black, except for the light testaceous antennae, and the underside and legs brownish.
