= Triodontella judaica =

Scientific classification
- Kingdom: Animalia
- Phylum: Arthropoda
- Clade: Pancrustacea
- Class: Insecta
- Order: Coleoptera
- Suborder: Polyphaga
- Infraorder: Scarabaeiformia
- Family: Scarabaeidae
- Genus: Triodontella
- Species: T. judaica

Binomial name
- Triodontella judaica (Blanchard, 1850)

Synonyms
- Omaloplia judaica Blanchard, 1850; Triodonta lusitanica Brenske, 1894

Species of beetle

Triodontella judaica is a species of beetle of the family Scarabaeidae. It is found in Iraq.

== Description ==
Adults reach a length of about 5.5 mm. The forehead and vertex have erect hairs and are less coarsely and less densely punctate than the clypeus. The thorax is very finely and densely punctate, with appressed hairs. The scutellum is elongate, pointed, and triangular, with very finely punctate hairs. The elytra have two distinct stripes with some indistinct ones beside them, evenly and finely punctate, with appressed hairs. The color of the elytra is light brown and dark.
