= Triodontella modesta =

Scientific classification
- Kingdom: Animalia
- Phylum: Arthropoda
- Clade: Pancrustacea
- Class: Insecta
- Order: Coleoptera
- Suborder: Polyphaga
- Infraorder: Scarabaeiformia
- Family: Scarabaeidae
- Genus: Triodontella
- Species: T. modesta

Binomial name
- Triodontella modesta (Péringuey, 1892)

Synonyms
- Euronycha modesta Péringuey, 1892

Species of beetle

Triodontella modesta is a species of beetle of the family Scarabaeidae. It is found in Namibia.

== Description ==
Adults reach a length of about 9 mm. They are testaceous, with the head and prothorax redder, covered with short appressed hairs, not sufficiently dense, however, to impart to it a sericeous appearance.
