= Triodontella raymondi =

Scientific classification
- Kingdom: Animalia
- Phylum: Arthropoda
- Clade: Pancrustacea
- Class: Insecta
- Order: Coleoptera
- Suborder: Polyphaga
- Infraorder: Scarabaeiformia
- Family: Scarabaeidae
- Genus: Triodontella
- Species: T. raymondi

Binomial name
- Triodontella raymondi (Perris, 1869)

Synonyms
- Triodonta raymondi Perris, 1869

Species of beetle

Triodontella raymondi is a species of beetle of the family Scarabaeidae. It is found in France (Corsica) and Italy (Sardinia).

== Description ==
Adults reach a length of about 7–9 mm. The body is entirely light brown, not very shiny and covered with a fine, light, short pubescence. The head has large, close punctation and the antennae are light-coloured. The pronotum is covered with fine, sparse punctures and there are long hairs along the sides and anterior margin. The elytra have fairly dense punctation, fine pubescence and long cilia on the sides.
