= Triodontella brevis =

Scientific classification
- Kingdom: Animalia
- Phylum: Arthropoda
- Clade: Pancrustacea
- Class: Insecta
- Order: Coleoptera
- Suborder: Polyphaga
- Infraorder: Scarabaeiformia
- Family: Scarabaeidae
- Genus: Triodontella
- Species: T. brevis

Binomial name
- Triodontella brevis (Brenske, 1890)

Synonyms
- Triodonta brevis Brenske, 1890

Species of beetle

Triodontella brevis is a species of beetle of the family Scarabaeidae. It is found in Senegal.

== Description ==
Adults reach a length of about 5 mm. They have a short body and they are reddish-yellow and glossy, with yellowish-brown pubescence.
