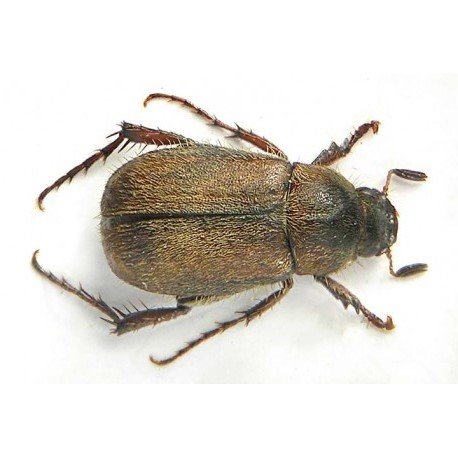

Scientific classification
- Kingdom: Animalia
- Phylum: Arthropoda
- Clade: Pancrustacea
- Class: Insecta
- Order: Coleoptera
- Suborder: Polyphaga
- Infraorder: Scarabaeiformia
- Family: Scarabaeidae
- Genus: Triodontella
- Species: T. nitidula

Binomial name
- Triodontella nitidula (Rossi, 1790)

Synonyms
- Melolontha nitidula Rossi, 1790; Melolontha sericans Gyllenhal, 1817; Melolontha sericea Bonelli, 1812; (preocc.)

= Triodontella nitidula =

Species of beetle

Triodontella nitidula is a species of beetle of the family Scarabaeidae. It is found in Austria, Italy and Slovenia.

== Description ==
Adults reach a length of about 4.5–5 mm. They have an elongated, slightly convex body. The colouration is highly variable. The head is dark brown and the body is light brown, more or less darkened on the disc of the pronotum, the suture and sides of the elytra and on the ventral surface. The legs are mahogany brown. The upper surface is covered with light, short pubescence. The antennae are testaceous with a blackish club.
