= Triodontella alni =

Scientific classification
- Kingdom: Animalia
- Phylum: Arthropoda
- Clade: Pancrustacea
- Class: Insecta
- Order: Coleoptera
- Suborder: Polyphaga
- Infraorder: Scarabaeiformia
- Family: Scarabaeidae
- Genus: Triodontella
- Species: T. alni

Binomial name
- Triodontella alni (Blanchard, 1850)

Synonyms
- Triodonta alni Blanchard, 1850; Serica luteipes Fairmaire, 1881

Species of beetle

Triodontella alni is a species of beetle of the family Scarabaeidae. It is found in Italy (Sardinia).

== Description ==
Adults reach a length of about 5–7 mm. They have a brownish-black, rather shiny body. The antennae and legs are reddish-brown. The sides of the pronotum are lightened, as is the base, in front of the scutellum (the latter is also testaceous). The elytra are brownish-black.

== Subspecies ==
- Triodontella alni alni (Sardinia)
- Triodontella alni luteipes (Fairmaire, 1881) (Sardinia)
