= Triodontella sericans =

Scientific classification
- Kingdom: Animalia
- Phylum: Arthropoda
- Clade: Pancrustacea
- Class: Insecta
- Order: Coleoptera
- Suborder: Polyphaga
- Infraorder: Scarabaeiformia
- Family: Scarabaeidae
- Genus: Triodontella
- Species: T. sericans

Binomial name
- Triodontella sericans (Fåhraeus, 1857)

Synonyms
- Triodonta sericans Fåhraeus, 1857; Euronycha sericans

Species of beetle

Triodontella sericans is a species of beetle of the family Scarabaeidae. It is found in South Africa (KwaZulu-Natal, Gariep, Cape).

== Description ==
Adults reach a length of about 5–7 mm. They are very pale testaceous, but the clypeus is testaceous. The whole body is covered with a whitish silky appressed pubescence.
