= Triodontella ikuthana =

Scientific classification
- Kingdom: Animalia
- Phylum: Arthropoda
- Clade: Pancrustacea
- Class: Insecta
- Order: Coleoptera
- Suborder: Polyphaga
- Infraorder: Scarabaeiformia
- Family: Scarabaeidae
- Genus: Triodontella
- Species: T. ikuthana

Binomial name
- Triodontella ikuthana (Brenske, 1901)

Synonyms
- Triodonta ikuthana Brenske, 1901

Species of beetle

Triodontella ikuthana is a species of beetle of the family Scarabaeidae. It is found in Kenya.

== Description ==
Adults reach a length of about 5 mm. They have a narrow, strongly punctate frons, which is covered with appressed hairs. The pronotum is somewhat darker in the middle than on the yellowish-brown sides, which are almost straight, scarcely widening posteriorly, the posterior angles sharp, almost slightly projecting, the surface uniformly densely punctate and covered with short, appressed hairs, with a few fine setae at the margins of the anterior angles. The elytra are uniformly densely punctate with short, appressed, uniform hairs. The suture and three ribs are somewhat convex and a stripe next to the lateral margin and before the apex next to the suture is darkened.
