= Triodontella cribellata =

Scientific classification
- Kingdom: Animalia
- Phylum: Arthropoda
- Class: Insecta
- Order: Coleoptera
- Suborder: Polyphaga
- Infraorder: Scarabaeiformia
- Family: Scarabaeidae
- Genus: Triodontella
- Species: T. cribellata

Binomial name
- Triodontella cribellata (Fairmaire, 1859)

Synonyms
- Triodonta cribellata Fairmaire, 1859

Species of beetle

Triodontella cribellata is a species of beetle of the family Scarabaeidae. It is found in France (Corsica).

== Description ==
Adults reach a length of about 7–8.5 mm. The body is entirely brown, somewhat blackish, not very shiny and covered with a fine, short light-coloured pubescence. The head has large punctation. The pronotum is covered with dense punctation anteriorly and laterally, with larger punctures on the disc and towards the base. The sides and anterior margin have long, erect cilia. The elytra are covered with fine, dense punctation and fine pubescence.
