= Vitens-Evides International =

Dutch water treatment company

VEI B.V. supports local water companies in developing and transition countries to improve their operations, become financially healthy and extend their services to the urban poor.

VEI B.V. was founded in 2005 and is powered by the two largest water companies of the Netherlands, Vitens and Evides. Together, both companies serve some 6.5 million customers, i.e. 40% of the Dutch population.
