= Helvetas =

Swiss international development organization

Helvetas Swiss Intercooperation
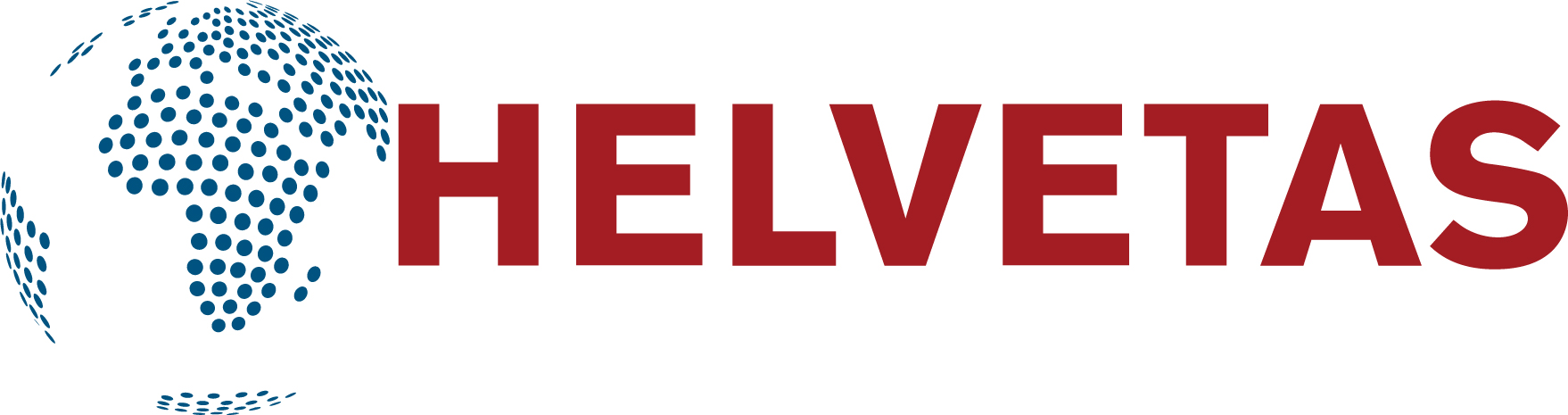
- Abbreviation: Helvetas
- Formation: June 18, 1955; 71 years ago
- Founder: Rodolfo Olgiati, Regina Kägi-Fuchsmann
- Founded at: Zürich, Switzerland
- Merger of: Intercooperation (2011)
- Type: Non-governmental organization
- Legal status: Association
- Purpose: International development cooperation and humanitarian response
- Headquarters: Weinbergstrasse 22A, 8021 Zürich, Switzerland
- Region served: Africa, Asia, Latin America, Eastern Europe
- Fields: Water, sanitation and hygiene (WASH); climate; agriculture; education; vocational skills development; economic development; governance; humanitarian response
- Official language: English, German, French, Italian
- President: Regula Rytz
- Executive Director: Melchior Lengsfeld
- Affiliations: Alliance 2015; Alliance Sud; Klima-Allianz Schweiz
- Revenue: CHF 175 million (2025)
- Funding: Private donations, membership contributions, institutional grants and public-sector contracts
- Employees: 1,800 (2025)
- Website: www.helvetas.org
- Formerly called: Swiss Association for Technical Assistance (1955–1965); Helvetas (1965–2011)

Helvetas Swiss Intercooperation, commonly known as Helvetas, is a Swiss non-governmental organization (NGO) engaged in international development cooperation and humanitarian response. Founded on 18 June 1955 and headquartered in Zürich, Switzerland, it operates as an association under Swiss law.

The organization was established as the Swiss Association for Technical Assistance (German: Schweizerisches Hilfswerk für aussereuropäische Gebiete, SHAG). It adopted the name Helvetas in 1965 and merged with the Swiss development organization Intercooperation in 2011, after which it adopted its current legal name.

As of 2026, Helvetas implements approximately 300 development and humanitarian programmes in 35 countries across Africa, Asia, Latin America and Eastern Europe. Its activities include water, sanitation and hygiene (WASH), agriculture, climate adaptation, education, vocational skills development, governance, economic development and humanitarian assistance. The organization employs approximately 1,800 staff, the majority of whom are based in programme countries.

Helvetas is financed through a combination of private donations, membership contributions, institutional grants and public-sector contracts. In 2025, it reported operating income of approximately CHF 175 million. Its programmes are referenced in reports by organizations including the World Bank, the OECD, the Swiss Agency for Development and Cooperation, Reuters, Swissinfo and in peer-reviewed academic publications.

== History ==
Helvetas was founded on 18 June 1955 in Zürich under the name Swiss Association for Technical Assistance (German: Schweizerisches Hilfswerk für aussereuropäische Gebiete, SHAG). The organization was established by a group of Swiss citizens who sought to support economic and social development in countries outside Europe through technical cooperation and long-term partnerships.

Among the key figures behind the organization's creation were Swiss humanitarian Rodolfo Olgiati, who advocated for extending Swiss solidarity beyond post-war Europe, and social worker Regina Kägi-Fuchsmann, both of whom played important roles in shaping its early vision.

In 1965, the organization adopted the name Helvetas, reflecting its growing international engagement. Over the following decades, it expanded its activities from technical assistance to broader development cooperation, including programmes in rural development, water and sanitation, education, governance, climate resilience and economic development.

In 2011, Helvetas merged with the Swiss development organization Intercooperation, which had been founded in 1982. Following the merger, the organization adopted the name Helvetas Swiss Intercooperation, combining the experience and expertise of both organizations while continuing to operate under the Helvetas brand.

== Governance and leadership ==
Helvetas is an association established under Swiss law. Its highest governing body is the General Assembly, in which all members have voting rights. The General Assembly elects the President and the Board of Directors, which is responsible for the organization's strategic direction, oversight and governance. The Board of Directors appoints the Management Board, which is responsible for the operational management of the organization and the implementation of its strategy.

The Management Board is headed by the Executive Director, who is responsible for the day-to-day leadership of Helvetas and the implementation of programmes worldwide. Since 2005, the Executive Director has been Melchior Lengsfeld. The Management Board also includes directors responsible for international programmes, finance and controlling, people and culture, marketing and communications, and advisory services.

As of 2026, the President of the Board of Directors is Regula Rytz, who has served in the role since 2021. The Board comprises members from fields including international development, business, science, public administration and civil society, providing strategic guidance and oversight for the organization.

Helvetas also maintains an Advisory Board composed of experts from a range of professional disciplines who provide independent advice on strategic and thematic issues. The organization's governance framework, bylaws, annual reports and strategic plans are publicly available through its official publications.

== Activities ==
Helvetas implements development cooperation and humanitarian response programmes in low- and middle-income countries across Africa, Asia, Latin America and Eastern Europe. It works primarily through partnerships with local governments, civil society organizations, community groups, academic institutions and private-sector actors. Most of the organization's staff are employed in the countries where programmes are implemented, with technical and strategic support provided by regional specialists and headquarters in Switzerland.

The organization's activities are grouped into several thematic areas:

- Water, sanitation and hygiene (WASH): Improving access to safe drinking water, sanitation facilities and hygiene services through infrastructure development, community management and institutional strengthening.
- Climate, environment and agriculture: Supporting climate change adaptation, sustainable agriculture, natural resource management, biodiversity conservation and food security.
- Education and vocational skills development: Strengthening education systems, vocational training and employment opportunities, particularly for young people and women.
- Economic development: Supporting entrepreneurship, small and medium-sized enterprises, agricultural value chains, financial inclusion and market systems to improve livelihoods and local economic development.
- Governance, inclusion and peace: Promoting democratic governance, public accountability, civic participation, gender equality, social inclusion and conflict prevention.
- Humanitarian response: Providing emergency assistance during armed conflicts, natural disasters and other humanitarian crises while supporting recovery and longer-term community resilience.

Programmes are adapted to local priorities and typically combine technical assistance, institutional capacity development and policy support. According to its 2025 Annual Report, Helvetas supported almost seven million people through its development cooperation and humanitarian programmes during the year.

== Countries of operation ==
As of 2026, Helvetas maintains comprehensive country programmes in 35 countries across Africa, Asia, Latin America, and Eastern and Southeast Europe. These programmes typically comprise multiple projects addressing development cooperation and, where required, humanitarian response.

- Africa: Benin, Burkina Faso, Ethiopia, Madagascar, Mali, Mozambique, Niger, Tanzania
- Asia: Bangladesh, Bhutan, India, Jordan, Kyrgyzstan, Laos, Lebanon, Myanmar, Nepal, Pakistan, Sri Lanka, Tajikistan, Uzbekistan, Vietnam
- Eastern and Southeast Europe: Albania, Bosnia and Herzegovina, Georgia, Kosovo, Moldova, North Macedonia, Serbia, Ukraine
- Latin America: Bolivia, Guatemala, Haiti, Honduras, Peru

In addition to these long-term country programmes, Helvetas also undertakes regional initiatives and time-limited projects in other countries, depending on development priorities, humanitarian needs and donor mandates.

== Memberships ==
Helvetas is a member of several national and international organizations active in international development and humanitarian cooperation. It is a member of Alliance2015, a network of European development organizations, and one of the supporting organizations of Alliance Sud, the joint development policy platform of major Swiss development organizations.

Helvetas is also a member of Klima-Allianz Schweiz, a Swiss network of organizations working on climate policy and sustainable development.

== Approach ==
Helvetas implements development programmes primarily through partnerships with local governments, civil society organizations, community groups and private-sector actors rather than through direct long-term service delivery. Its activities typically combine technical assistance, institutional capacity building, policy support and market systems development, depending on local priorities and donor objectives.

Across its programmes, Helvetas integrates themes such as gender equality, social inclusion, environmental sustainability and climate resilience. In humanitarian settings, the organization combines emergency assistance with longer-term recovery and resilience-building initiatives where appropriate.

== Monitoring and evaluation ==
Helvetas monitors and evaluates its development cooperation and humanitarian programmes through monitoring, evaluation and learning (MEL) systems and commissions independent evaluations for selected donor-funded projects.

The organization publishes annual reports, audited financial statements and strategic documents that provide information on its governance, programme activities and financial performance. It also maintains policies on safeguarding, ethical conduct, anti-corruption and whistleblowing as part of its organizational accountability framework.

== Funding ==
Helvetas finances its activities through a combination of private donations, membership contributions, grants and project contracts. Its income is derived from individual donors, charitable foundations, corporations, multilateral organizations and public-sector development agencies, which support both long-term programmes and project-specific activities.

The Swiss Agency for Development and Cooperation (SDC), part of the Swiss Federal Department of Foreign Affairs, is Helvetas' largest institutional partner. In addition to providing programme contributions, the SDC awards Helvetas mandates to implement development and humanitarian projects through competitive procurement processes.

Helvetas also receives funding from the State Secretariat for Economic Affairs (SECO), other national development agencies, the European Union, United Nations organizations and international financial institutions, as well as from private foundations and philanthropic organizations.

The organization publishes annual reports and audited financial statements detailing its income, expenditure, governance and programme activities. These reports are publicly available on the organization's website and are prepared in accordance with Swiss financial reporting requirements.

As of 2025, Helvetas reported annual income of approximately CHF 175 million, derived from private donations, institutional grants, public-sector development agencies and project contracts.

As of 2025, Helvetas employed approximately 1,800 staff and implemented around 300 programmes in 35 countries.

  1. Relationship with the Swiss Agency for Development and Cooperation

Helvetas has been a long-standing implementing partner of the Swiss Agency for Development and Cooperation (SDC), the international cooperation agency of the Swiss Federal Department of Foreign Affairs. Through competitive mandates, programme contributions and strategic partnerships, Helvetas supports the implementation of Swiss international cooperation objectives in areas including water and sanitation, climate adaptation, sustainable agriculture, governance, economic development, vocational skills development and humanitarian response.

SDC country and regional cooperation programmes identify Helvetas as an implementing partner in a number of countries and regions, including Nepal, the Mekong region (Cambodia and Laos), Central Asia, Bangladesh, Ukraine, Haiti, Kosovo, Bosnia and Herzegovina, Albania and Tunisia. These programmes focus on areas such as democratic governance, climate resilience, sustainable water management, disaster risk reduction, economic development and support for vulnerable communities.

SDC has also highlighted Helvetas' contribution to specific initiatives, including post-earthquake reconstruction in Nepal, climate adaptation in Bangladesh, land rights programmes in Laos, drinking water and education projects in Pakistan, and humanitarian and recovery activities in Ukraine.

== Notable programmes ==
Helvetas has been associated with a number of development cooperation programmes that have been documented by government, multilateral, media and academic sources.

In Nepal, Helvetas has been linked to long-running rural infrastructure and reconstruction work. A book on trail bridge construction in the Himalayas reported that more than 4,000 trail bridges had been built over a period of around 40 years. Reuters also reported on the Skills for Reconstruction programme after the 2015 Nepal earthquake, stating that almost 9,000 people had received construction-skills training and that trainees had contributed to rebuilding more than 3,000 houses.

In Peru, Helvetas has served as implementing partner for SeCompetitivo, a programme supported by the Swiss State Secretariat for Economic Affairs to strengthen competitiveness, value chains and market-oriented skills. In Laos, World Bank project documents identify Helvetas as grant recipient and implementing agency for a public information and legal-awareness project for vulnerable communities.

Helvetas has also had a long engagement in Bhutan. Swissinfo reported that Helvetas was the first international development organization to establish operations in Bhutan in 1975, as part of Switzerland's broader development cooperation with the country.

== Criticism and controversies ==
=== Expulsion of the Laos country director ===
In December 2012, the Lao government ordered the expulsion of Helvetas's country director, Anne-Sophie Gindroz, after she criticized restrictions on civil society and freedom of expression in Laos at an international development forum. The decision drew attention in Switzerland and internationally because Helvetas had been active in Laos for several decades.

According to Swissinfo, Helvetas expressed regret over the decision, sought clarification through the Swiss authorities, and stated that it intended to continue its development programmes in Laos despite the expulsion. At the time, the organization's programme in Laos had an annual budget of approximately CHF 3.4 million.

The incident highlighted the challenges faced by international development organizations operating in countries with restricted civic space and underscored the balance such organizations must strike between development cooperation and advocacy for an enabling environment for civil society.

== Independent assessments ==
Helvetas' programmes have been evaluated and documented by multilateral organizations, international media and academic researchers.

A World Bank restructuring paper on the Public Information and Awareness Services for Vulnerable Communities in Lao PDR reported that, following initial implementation delays, project performance improved substantially during 2024. The mid-term review assessed the implementing agency's performance as satisfactory and concluded that the project's development objectives remained achievable following an extension of the implementation period.

A 2018 Reuters report on post-earthquake reconstruction in Nepal highlighted the results of the Skills for Reconstruction programme, stating that almost 9,000 people had received construction skills training and that programme participants had contributed to rebuilding more than 3,000 houses in earthquake-affected districts.

Academic research has also examined Helvetas-supported programmes. A study published in the Community Development Journal analysed participatory vocational education in Kyrgyzstan and concluded that locally driven curriculum development and community participation strengthened local ownership of training initiatives. A later study in Proceedings of the Institution of Civil Engineers – Transport found that Nepal's trail bridge programme demonstrated a strong commitment to gender-responsive policy, while also identifying shortcomings in implementation and recommending greater participation of women in decision-making and stronger recognition of unpaid care work.

Research published in Environmental Science & Technology documented collaboration between Helvetas Nepal and research institutions in evaluating rural drinking-water systems across 33 communities, illustrating the organization's participation in applied scientific research related to water supply and public health.

Swissinfo has also described Helvetas' long-term role in Bhutan, noting that the organization was the first international development organization to establish operations in the country in 1975 and presenting its decades-long engagement as part of Switzerland's broader development cooperation with Bhutan.

== See also ==
- International development
- Humanitarian aid
- Sustainable Development Goals
- Swiss Agency for Development and Cooperation (SDC)
- Alliance Sud
- Alliance2015
