= Triodontella aquila =

Scientific classification
- Kingdom: Animalia
- Phylum: Arthropoda
- Clade: Pancrustacea
- Class: Insecta
- Order: Coleoptera
- Suborder: Polyphaga
- Infraorder: Scarabaeiformia
- Family: Scarabaeidae
- Genus: Triodontella
- Species: T. aquila

Binomial name
- Triodontella aquila (Laporte, 1840)

Synonyms
- Serica aquila Laporte, 1840; Triodonta aquila noctua Mulsant, 1842

Species of beetle

Triodontella aquila is a species of beetle of the family Scarabaeidae. It is found in France.

== Description ==
Adults reach a length of about 7–8 mm. They have an entirely light brown, faintly glossy body, which is covered with fine, short light-coloured pubescence. The head has large, dense punctation. The pronotum is covered with medium-sized, sparse punctation. The sides and anterior margin have long, erect cilia. The elytra are covered with fine, dense punctation and fine pubescence. There are long cilia.
