= Elf (disambiguation) =

An elf is a mythological creature, originally from Germanic mythology.

Elf or Elves may also refer to:

== Entertainment ==
=== Fictional entities ===
- Christmas elf
- Elves in fiction, of the fantasy genre:
  - Elves in Middle-earth, in JRR Tolkien's work
  - Elves in Discworld, in Terry Pratchett's work inspired by Tolkien's Elves
  - House-elf, a magical creature in Harry Potter

=== Film, television and media ===
- Elf (film), a 2003 American Christmas comedy film
  - Elf (musical), based on the film
- Elf (band), an American band
  - Elf (album), their 1972 album
- Elves (film), a 1989 American horror film
- Lego Elves, a toy line and media franchise that began in 2015
- Elves (TV series), a 2021 Danish television series

=== Games ===
- Elf (video game), published in the 1990s
- Elf (Dungeons & Dragons), a humanoid race in the role-playing game
- Elves (Mayfair Games), a 1983 supplement for role-playing games

== Politics ==
- Earth Liberation Front, an international environmentalist political group
- Environmental Life Force, an American radical environmental group
- Eritrean Liberation Front, a main independence movement in Eritrea
- Essential Living Fund, an English welfare assistance scheme
- European Liberal Forum, a think-tank
- European Liberation Front, a neo-fascist group

== Science and technology ==
- Electron localization function
- Epithelial lining fluid, a type of mucus in the respiratory system, also called airway surface liquid (ASL)
- ELVES, a type of upper atmospheric lightning
- Enceladus Life Finder, a proposed NASA astrobiology mission to Saturn's moon Enceladus
- Extremely low frequency, electromagnetic radiation (radio waves) with frequencies from 3 to 30 Hz
- Eretis, a genus of butterfly
- Microtia elva, a species of butterfly

=== Computing ===
- COSMAC Elf, a single-board computer kit based on the RCA 1802 microprocessor
- Executable and Linkable Format (.elf), a file format for executable files
- Extended Log Format, a text format for web server log files
- Elf, a tablet in the NOVO7 series

== Vehicles ==
- Ekolot JK 01A Elf, a Polish motorglider
- Isuzu Elf, a truck model
- Riley Elf, an automobile
- USS Elf (SP-81), a United States Navy patrol boat
- Elf (yacht), an American racing yacht
- Pesa Elf, a family of Polish electric multiple units
- Elf, a tugboat taken into British Empire service as Empire Belle

== Organisations ==
- Elf Aquitaine, a French oil company
- ELF Corporation, a Japanese eroge game studio
- Elvish Linguistic Fellowship, an organization that studies the invented languages of J. R. R. Tolkien
- Endangered Language Fund, an American linguistic group
- Environmental Law Foundation, a British charity
- Estonian Nature Fund, an environmental organization
- European Lacrosse Federation
- European League of Football, a professional American football league based in Europe
- e.l.f. (acronym of Eyes Lips Face), an international cosmetics brand
- Earth Liberation Front

== Other uses ==
- English as a lingua franca
- Elf Cafe, American restaurant

== See also ==
- ALF (disambiguation)
- Elfin (disambiguation)
- Elph (disambiguation)
