= Social Fund =

The term social fund may refer to:

- Social fund in developing countries which provides financing (usually grants) for small-scale public investments
- The European Social Fund
- the UK's Social Fund, part of the system of Social Security.
- the Russian Social Fund, part of the system of Social Security.
