= ELV =

ELV or ELVs may refer to:

- Elfin Cove Seaplane Base, an airport in Alaska that has IATA code ELV
- End of Life Vehicles Directive, a European Union directive to facilitate recycling and reuse of old automobiles (ELV means "End-of-Life Vehicles")
- Ensemble de Lancement Vega, a launch pad at the Guiana Space Centre
- Ethel Lilian Voynich (1864–1960), known as ELV, Anglo-Irish novelist and musician
- Expendable launch vehicle, a single-use space launch vehicle used in an expendable launch system
- Experimental law variations, the so-called Stellenbosch Laws in rugby union
- Extra-low voltage, an electrical standard designed to protect against electric shock
- Elektronisches Lastschriftverfahren, a form of direct debit transaction popular in Germany, popularly known as Lastschrift or Bankeinzug

== See also ==
- Elf (disambiguation)
