= Canon EF 24-85mm lens =

EF 24–85mm f/3.5–4.5 USM
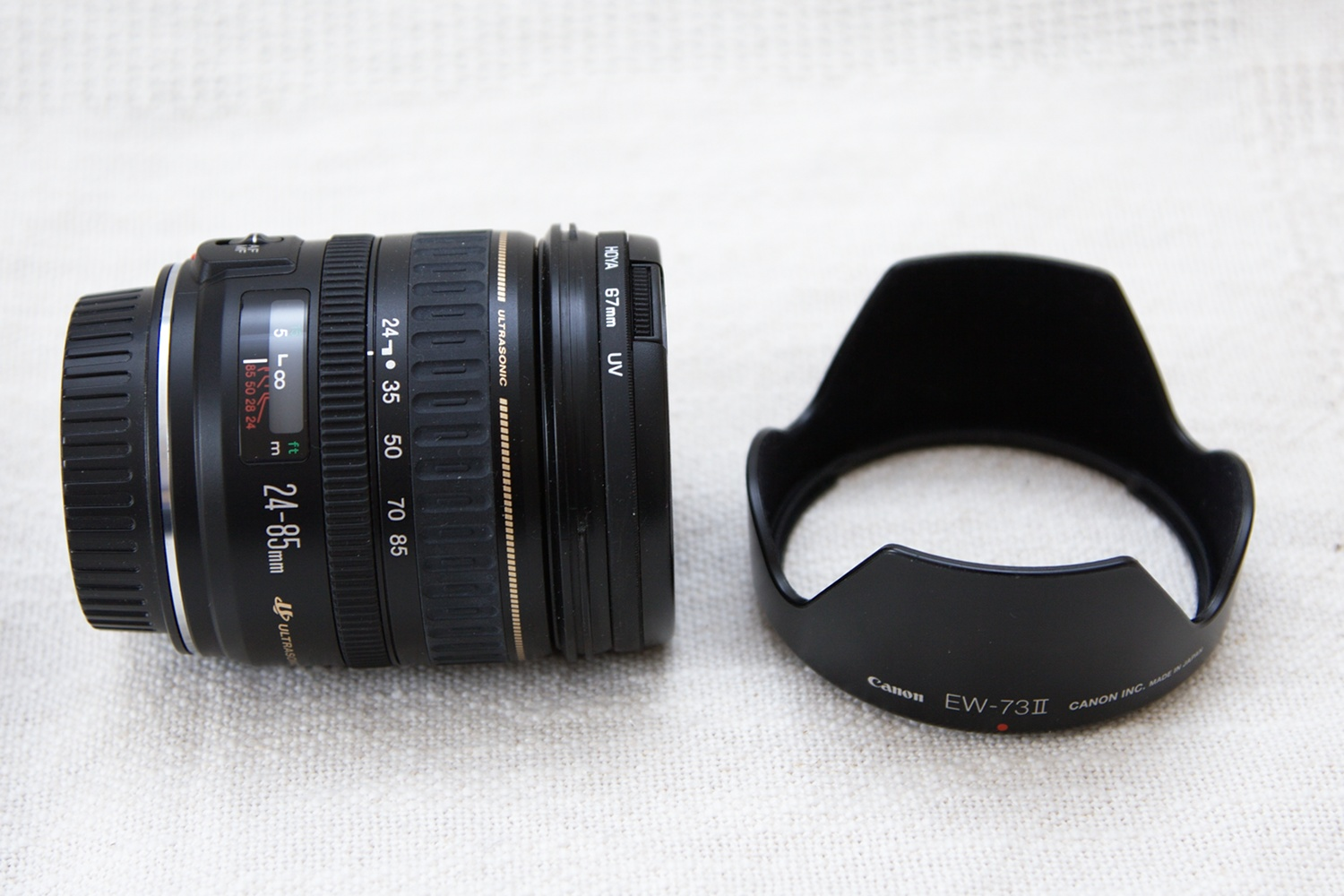
- Maker: Canon

Technical data
- Type: Zoom
- Focus drive: Ultrasonic motor
- Focal length: 24-85 mm
- Crop factor: 1.0
- Aperture (max/min): f/3.5 / f/32
- Close focus distance: 0.5 m
- Max. magnification: 0.16
- Diaphragm blades: 6
- Construction: 15 elements in 12 groups

Features
- Short back focus: No No
- Lens-based stabilization: No No
- Macro capable: No No
- Application: Standard Zoom

Physical
- Max. length: 69.5 mm
- Diameter: 73 mm
- Weight: 380 g
- Filter diameter: 67 mm

Accessories
- Lens hood: EW-73II

History
- Introduction: September 1996

Retail info
- MSRP: 58,000 Yen USD

The EF 24–85mm f/3.5–4.5 USM is an EF mount wide-to-normal zoom lens. It was introduced by Canon in 1996. The lens was originally sold with the Canon EOS IX, an APS film SLR, although it was fully compatible with Canon's 35mm film SLRs. The lens was available in two colour schemes: silver when sold with the EOS IX, and black when sold separately. The lens remained in production during Canon's shift to digital SLRs and was often included in press images of the Canon EOS D30. As of June 2010 it is no longer listed on Canon's North American product page.
