= LWA =

LWA may refer to:

- Leavenworth station in Washington State
- Leawarra railway station, Melbourne
- Lightly wounded in action
- Local welfare assistance scheme, program related to Social Fund
- Long Wavelength Array, radio telescope in New Mexico
- LTE-WLAN Aggregation, a way of combining LTE and Wi-Fi access to improve mobile device throughput
- Little Witch Academia, anime created by Yoh Yoshinari and produced by Trigger

== See also ==
- Lwa, Voodoo (Voudon) spirits
- L_{WA}, sound power level in dB weighted A, dB(A)
