= Essential Living Fund =

English welfare assistance scheme

The Essential Living Fund (ELF) is a local welfare assistance scheme in Essex, England that was introduced in April 2013 following the abolition of the discretionary element of the Social Fund. It replaces two discretionary elements of the Social Fund - crisis loans and community care grants. Under the old system, these payments were administered by the Department for Work and Pensions, but ELFs are now administered by local government. According to Citizens Advice literature, ELFs are "designed to ease exceptional pressure on people and their families". However, these benefits are not in the form of currency and are distributed using indirect methods such as: Use of food vouchers or supermarket vouchers, use of AllPay cards, provision of recycled furniture from reputable charity, and provision of white goods from a reputable local dealer. These indirect methods reduce the control participating individuals have over what they buy.

The scheme can cover fields such as:

- furniture: bed, settee, armchair, wardrobe, table
- furnishings: carpets, curtains, bedding
- white goods : cookers, fridge, washing machines
- household equipment: crockery, cutlery, bedding
- clothing and footwear
- general living expenses: these are day-to-day living expenses such as groceries, nappies, toiletries, cleaning/hygiene products, money for pay as you go fuel meters.

If you are awarded the grant you will not be paid in cash or into a bank account. Instead it will be:

- food or supermarket vouchers
- AllPay cards
- high quality recycled furniture from reputable charity
- white goods from a reputable local dealer.
