= Canon EF 22-55mm lens =

Canon SLR EF-mount zoom lens

Canon EF 22–55mm f/4–5.6 USM
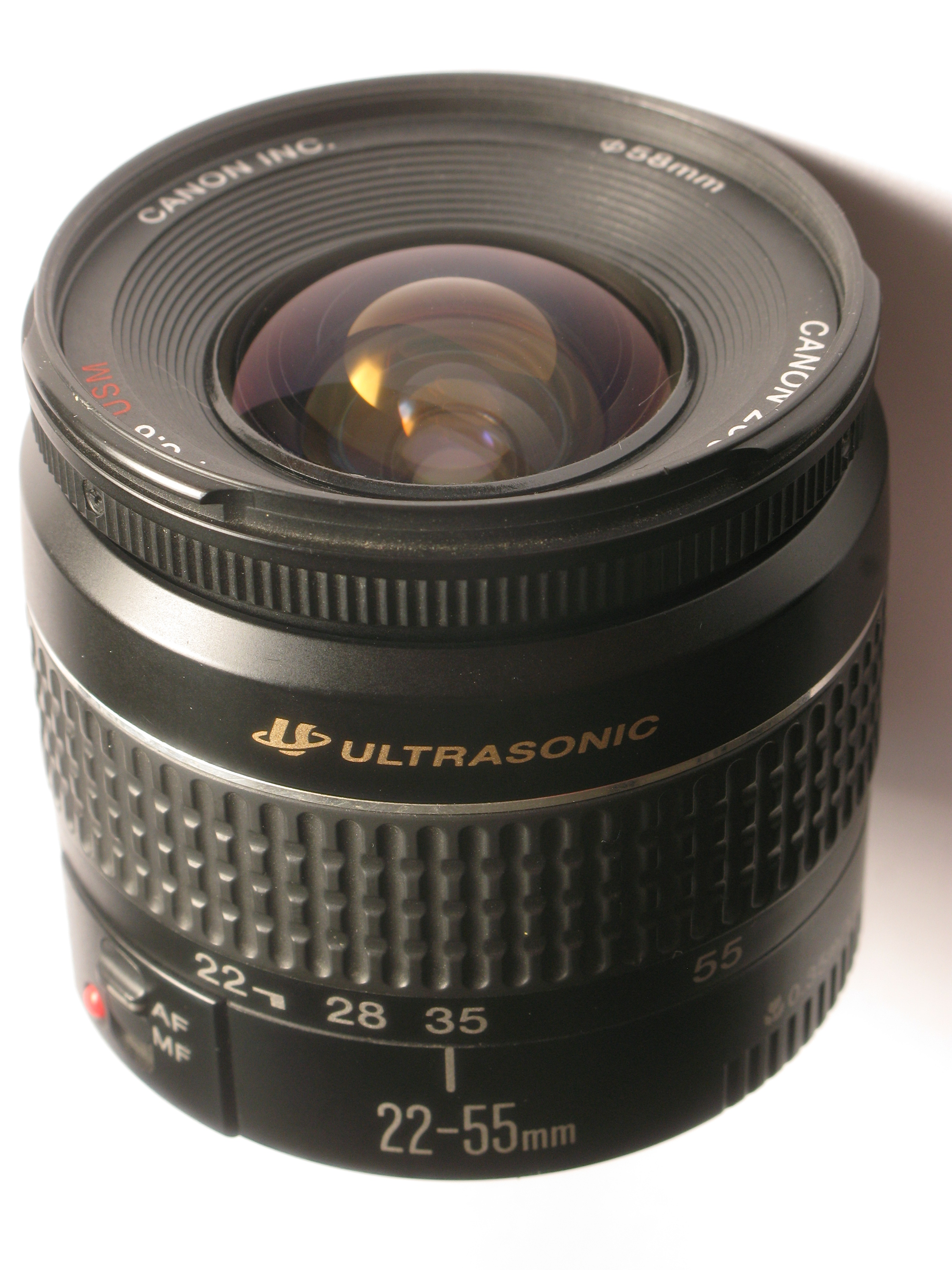
- Maker: Canon

Technical data
- Focus drive: Ultrasonic motor
- Focal length: 22–55mm
- Crop factor: 1
- Aperture (max/min): f/4–5.6 – f/22–32
- Close focus distance: 0.35 m
- Diaphragm blades: 5
- Construction: 9 elements in 9 groups

Features
- Short back focus: No No
- Lens-based stabilization: No No
- Macro capable: Yes Yes
- Application: standard zoom lens

Physical
- Max. length: 59 mm
- Diameter: 69 mm
- Weight: 175 g
- Filter diameter: 58 mm

History
- Introduction: 1998

The Canon EF 22–55mm f/4–5.6 USM lens is a consumer grade lens that has now been discontinued. It was originally released in February 1998, as one of two kit lenses for the Canon EOS IX Lite, an APS-format film SLR, although it is also fully compatible with Canon's 35mm film SLRs, and subsequent APS-C and full-frame DSLRs.

The EF 22–55mm lens starts off at an APS camera wide (35mm – 35 mm equivalent focal length) and ends at short telephoto (88mm – 35 mm equivalent focal length). This lens was designed to complement the EF 55–200mm f/4.5-5.6 USM, also designed for the IX-series SLR's.

This lens, being one of the older lenses, is enjoying a renaissance along with other EF/FD/FL lenses that can be purchased second-hand and used on a mirrorless camera via an adapter. This is a cheaper method for APS-C Cameras of obtaining a 'kit' lens equivalent (35–90mm 35 mm equivalent focal length for digital), offering almost the range of an 18–55mm kit lens.
