= Elph =

Elph or ELPH may refer to:

- Elph (therapsid), an extinct genus of therapsids
- Canon ELPH, a series of cameras
- ELpH, a project of the experimental music band Coil

== See also ==
- Elf (disambiguation)
