= Water supply and sanitation in Senegal =

Data
- Water coverage (broad definition): 75%
- Sanitation coverage (broad definition): 48%
- Share of collected wastewater treated: Low
- Continuity of supply: Yes
- Average urban water use (L/person/day): 62
- Average urban water and sanitation tariff (US$/m^{3}): US$8.50/month (water only) plus US$1/month for sewerage
- Share of household metering: High
- Annual investment in WSS: US$50 million per year (1996–2006 average) or US$4.50/capita
- Share of self-financing by utilities: High
- Share of tax-financing: Zero
- Share of external financing: High
- Non-revenue water: 20%

Institutions
- Decentralization to municipalities: No
- National water and sanitation company: Yes
- Water and sanitation regulator: No
- Responsibility for policy setting: Ministère de l'Urbanisme, de l'Habitat, de l'Hydraulique urbaine, de l'Hygiène publique et de l'Assainissement
- Sector law: No
- No. of urban service providers: Holding company (SONES) and operator (SDE) for water; 1 for sanitation (ONAS)
- No. of rural service providers: 1,400 community-based groups (ASUFOR)

Water supply and sanitation in Senegal is characterized by a relatively-high level of access compared to most of sub-Saharan Africa. A public–private partnership (PPP) has operated in Senegal since 1996, with Senegalaise des Eaux (SDE, a subsidiary of Saur International) the private partner. SDE does not own the water system, but manages it on a 10-year lease from the Senegalese government. Between 1996 and 2014, water sales doubled to 131 million cubic meters per year; the number of household connections increased by 165 percent, to over 638,000. According to the World Bank, "The Senegal case is regarded as a model of public-private partnership in sub-Saharan Africa". A national sanitation company is in charge of sewerage, wastewater treatment and stormwater drainage, which is modeled on the national sanitation company of Tunisia and is unique in sub-Saharan Africa.

== Access ==
In 2015, 75 percent of Senegal's population had access to at least one basic water source and 48 percent had access to basic sanitation. There is a significant difference between water supply in urban areas (91-percent access) and rural areas (63 percent). Sanitation access rates also differ significantly between urban and rural areas, with 66 percent of the urban population having sanitation access and 35 percent of the rural population having access. In urban areas, 75 percent of the population has access to water connections in their house or on their property and 17 percent rely on water kiosks and standpipes. Nineteen percent of the country's urban population are connected to sewers, and 60 percent are served by septic tanks or improved household-level latrines.

2015 access to water and sanitation in Senegal
| | | Urban (50% of the population) | Rural (50% of the population) | Total |
|---|---|---|---|---|
| Water | At least basic | 91% | 63% | 75% |
| Water | House connections | 75% | 17% | 46% |
| Sanitation | At least basic | 66% | 35% | 48% |
| Sanitation | Sewerage | 19% | 2% | 11% |

Source: Joint Monitoring Program for Water and Sanitation of the WHO and UNICEF

A key source for these figures is the Senegalese survey, part of the WHO's 2003 World Health Survey. The figure for access to an improved source of water in urban areas (92 percent) is somewhat lower than the figure reported by the utility SDE and quoted, among others, by the World Bank (98 percent).

== Service ==
Water supply in Dakar and most other cities in Senegal is continuous. In 1994, service was provided for an average of 16 hours per day. Faced with increasing demand from newly-connected users and constraints on water resources, the private operator initially distributed supply interruptions equitably among Dakar's neighborhoods. The average hours of supply per day were increased to 19 in 2001, and a continuous water supply was achieved in 2006; this was facilitated by the 1999 expansion of a water pipeline from Lac de Guiers. In 2004, 97.7 percent of water samples were in conformity with microbiological water norms (up from 96 percent in 1996).

== Water resources ==
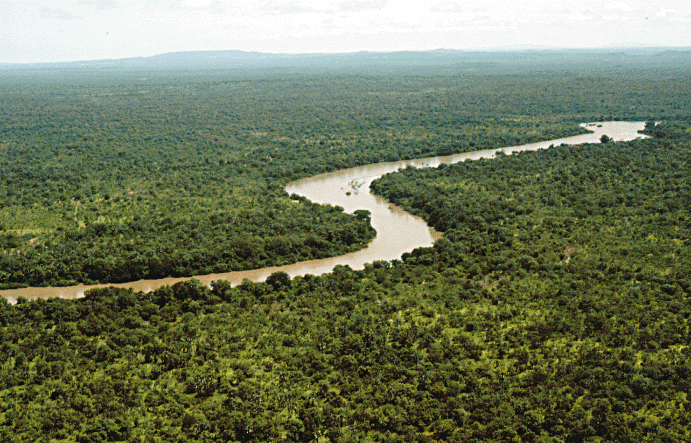
The Gambia River in Senegal's Niokolo-Koba National Park

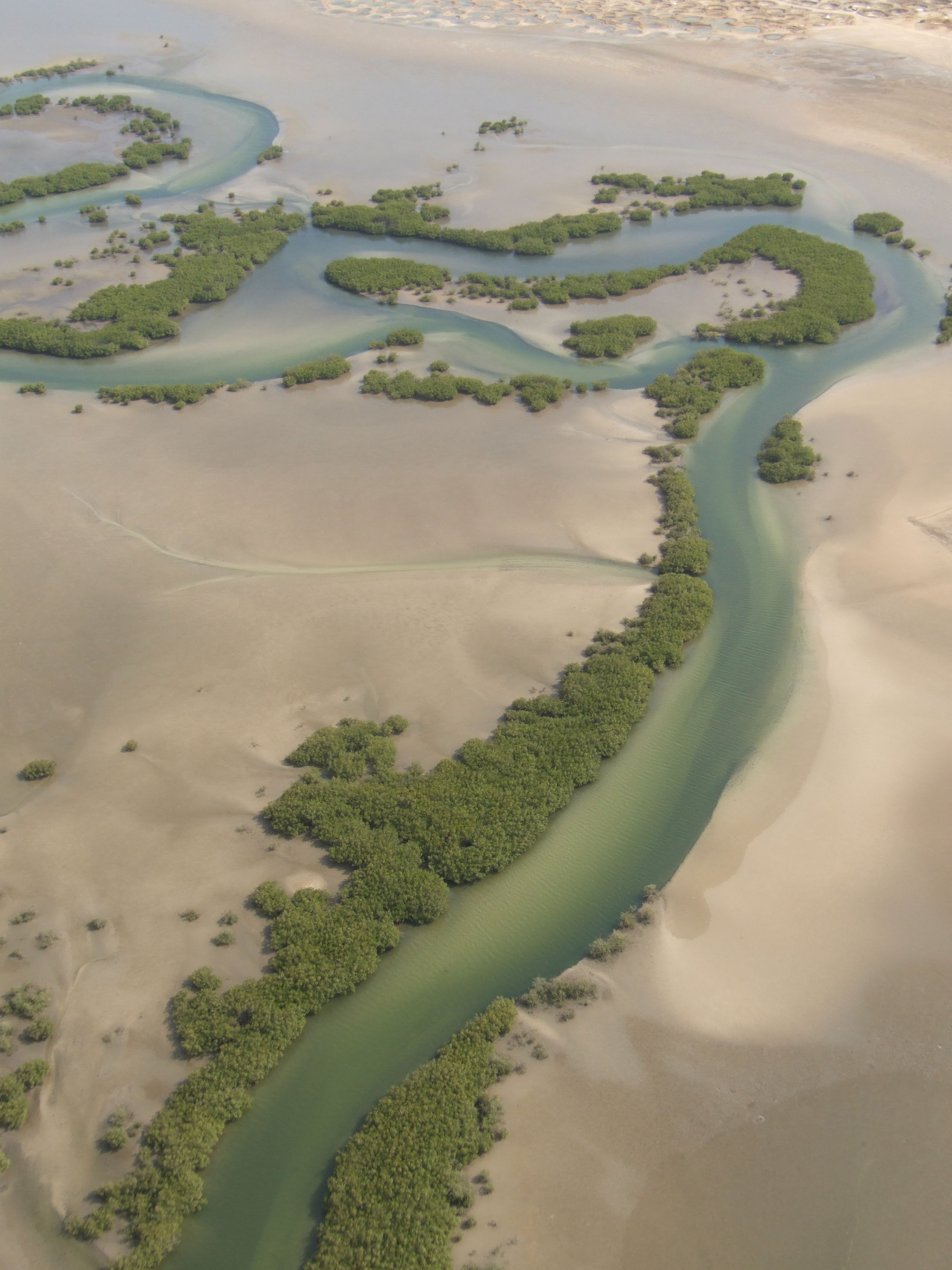
The Saloum River in central Senegal

Senegal's climate is tropical, with well-defined dry and humid seasons. Dakar's annual rainfall of about 600 millimetres (24 in) falls between June and October. The mean annual precipitation ranges from 270 millimetres (11 in) per year in the north to 1,793 millimetres (70.6 in) per year in the south. Interior temperatures are much higher than they are along the coast.

The largest water resource in the country is the Senegal River in the north, which is shared with Mauritania, Mali and Guinea. Its average flow is 37 billion cubic meters per year. The Lac de Guiers is an important water reservoir in the upper delta of the Senegal River, with a storage volume of almost 500 million cubic meters. It is a chief source of fresh water for Dakar, hundreds of kilometers south-west, through underground pipes. Although Senegal River water is abundant, water in most of the rest of the country is scarce. Other major surface water bodies include the Casamance River, the Gambia River, the Saloum River, the Geba River, the Falémé River and the Tamna lagoon near Thiès.

Senegal has about three billion cubic meters of renewable groundwater, excluding groundwater which overlaps surface water. Total water withdrawals in 1987 were 1.4 billion cubic meters, of which 92 percent was for agriculture, three percent for industry and five percent for domestic uses. Groundwater reserves include aquifers up to 20 metres (66 ft) deep in the Casamance and 40–60 metres (130–200 ft) deep in Kaolack and Tamba, and crop-outs near Dakar and Thiès. They also include aquifers at a depth of 200–400 metres (660–1,310 ft). Groundwater stocks are estimated at seven billion cubic meters.

Groundwater overexploitation (overdrafting) is a serious problem in parts of Senegal. Mont Rolland, 70 kilometres (43 mi) from Dakar, was known for its mineral springs; villagers currently need to drill as deep as 80 metres (260 ft) to pump water. The village's groundwater was seriously depleted by over-extraction by the mineral-water company, which is presently closed. Almost 80 percent of Senegalese horticulturalists are located near Mont Rolland.

Dakar is supplied primarily with water drawn from fossil aquifers which may be over-exploited and contaminated with salt water. Some water is being brought in from the Ngnith water-treatment plant on the Lac de Guiers through a pipeline whose capacity was increased in 1999. Because of growing demand and the need to close contaminated boreholes, surface water will have to be brought from the Senegal River, about 240 kilometres (150 mi) away, requiring high investment costs to expand the existing pipeline. The additional Senegal River water is expected to increase from 0.5 m^{3}/s to about 6.0 m^{3}/s in 2030. The requirements are well within Senegal's water rights under agreements with neighboring countries. However, such large quantities of water would have a significant environmental impact on the Lac de Guiers and the Senegal River delta. Future low flow on the Senegal River is difficult to predict due to climate change and uncertainties about the Manantali Dam.

Most of Dakar's wastewater is discharged, without treatment, into the Atlantic Ocean. The Cambérène wastewater-treatment plant, Senegal's largest, treats about 15 percent of the wastewater generated in Dakar. Since 2007, the station has been operated and expanded by the French company SAUR. Some of the treated wastewater is being reused. By 2007, water was being reused for a golf course and was envisaged for the irrigation of trees, green space and vegetable gardens after tertiary treatment.

== Infrastructure ==
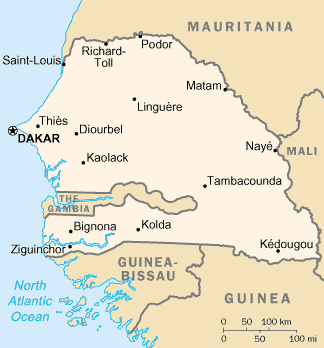
Major cities in Senegal

In 2005, ONAS operated a 773-kilometre (480 mi) sewer network, 57 sewage pumping stations and seven wastewater-treatment plants, and had 70,931 subscribers in Dakar, Saint-Louis, Rufisque, Louga, Thiès, Saly and Kaolack. It also operated 113 kilometres (70 mi) of stormwater drains and seven stormwater pumping stations in Dakar and four towns.

== Responsibility ==
=== Policy ===
The Ministère de l'Urbanisme, de l'Habitat, de l'Hydraulique urbaine, de l'Hygiène publique et de l'Assainissement sets policy for urban water supply and sanitation. The Ministère de l'Hydraulique rurale et du Réseau hydrographique national is in charge of rural water supply. These responsibilities had been under the Ministry of Agriculture.

=== Service provision ===
Responsibility for urban water supply is shared between the Senegalese national water company (Société Nationale des Eaux du Senegal, SONES), a holding company, and Sénégalaise des Eaux (SDE), a private company. The French water company SAUR initially owned a 51-percent share in SDE and the remaining 49 percent was divided between Senegal (five percent), Senegalese individuals (39 percent) and employees (five percent). In 2011, SAUR was not listed as a shareholder on the SDE website. Its shares are held by the West African infrastructure holding company Finagestion, which is majority-owned by the US-based, Africa-focused private equity fund Emerging Capital Partners. The Office National de l'Assainissement du Sénégal (ONAS) is in charge of sanitation.

In rural areas, user associations known as Associations d'usagers de forages ruraux (ASUFOR) manage water systems supplied by tube wells. Senegal obliges them to sign maintenance contracts with private companies to ensure system sustainability, and they can delegate the operation of their systems to third parties.

== Approaches ==
Approaches introduced to the Senegalese water sector include the country-wide lease contract, the public-private-NGO-community partnership for standpipes in Dakar, and the use of small enterprises to maintain rural and small-town water systems with the support of micro-credits.

=== Urban water-supply lease ===
One of the best-known and successful innovative approaches to water supply in Senegal is the lease signed in 1996. According to the Senegalese government, the number of clients of Sénégalaise des eaux (SDE) increased from 241,671 in 1996 to 638,629 in 2014. Out of almost 400,000 new connections, 206,000 served the poorest population, primarily on the outskirts of Dakar.

According to the World Bank, the government reached the poor by establishing a national fund to subsidize the private operator. It aimed to improve services to the poor for a lower price. Social connections were free, and a connection fee was charged for wealthier households. SDE and the Senegalese National Society of Water Usage (SONES) worked through a large NGO to identify the need for social connections, and the private operator set up a decentralized, computerized network of payment booths; this facilitated payments by domestic clients. The operator's remuneration was based on the amount of water produced and sold, providing an incentive to serve as many customers as possible and reduce water losses.

A 2006 study by the Boston Institute for Developing Economies (BIDE) estimated the net benefits of the lease at US$457 million. Customers had better access to more water and to the government, and small benefits ($6 million) accrued to the owners of the water company. Foreign lenders lost $14 million and employees lost $10 million in job losses and lower increases to wages and benefits.

The private operator was selected competitively in a two-stage bidding process. Four bidders, all French, participated in the first stage: Générale des Eaux (now Vivendi Environnement), Lyonnaise des Eaux (now SUEZ), the Société d'Aménagement Urbain et Rural (SAUR), and CISE (later merged with SAUR). Qualified bidders submitted a proposal, which was evaluated at a meeting. SAUR was invited to bid, although the company had advised SONEES since 1980. The World Bank opposed eliminating them from the bidding but SONEES was instructed to finish all contracts, end all contact, and give SAUR no access to their operation four months before the bidding. All four bidders were invited to submit revised technical proposals and financial bids; Lyonnaise des Eaux eliminated for non-compliance. The bid from Générale des Eaux was also eliminated, since they refused to endorse some contract requirements. The two remaining bidders, CISE and SAUR, were invited to present second-stage bids. On October 25, 1995, SAUR was announced as the winner based on price. The company's bid was a water-supply rate of 236 F.CFA per cubic meter, 62 percent of the average tariff at the time.

According to critics such as the Dakar-based regional NGO Aide Transparence, the number of connections has only increased from 203,902 in 1996 to 264,161 in 2002. This contrasts with a 2002 SDE figure of 338,398 connections. The Aide Transparence report cited customer complaints about poorer water quality, increased use of mineral water in Senegal, and cuts in tap water one or more days.

=== Community partnership for standpipes in Dakar ===
Another approach is the community partnership with SONES, SDE, and an international NGO with local roots (Enda Tiers-Monde) to select locations for standpipes, build and operate them. The partnership installs metered standpipes for poor households who had used polluted well water. The program is demand-responsive, instead of relying on supply-side targeting of the poor. The community is involved in planning, construction, and maintenance, leading to strong ownership and nearly-100-percent cost recovery. Households pay the standpipe operator, who pays the utility for the water. The community chooses the operator (or a group of rotating operators) who may work for the community or, occasionally, for themselves for a share. There are two types of standpipe schemes. SONES finances the infrastructure cost in one, and ENDA finances the infrastructure of the other. The latter scheme, known as the "Eau Populaire" program, began in 1995. The SONES scheme has installed about 250 standpipes, and the ENDA scheme about 130. In 2001, An estimated 200,000 people had access to potable water with the Eau Populaire project in 2001, and it has led to a significant drop in waterborne illnesses in children. The project has also created several hundred jobs (standpipe operators who receive 30,000 to 80,000 CFA per month) and funds other local projects with standpipe revenue.

=== Rural water supply ===
In rural areas, the government began supporting the introduction of sustainable management models for piped-water systems using boreholes in 1999 with the pilot project REGEFOR in central Senegal. The project includes the use of metering and volumetric pricing, maintenance contracts with private-sector companies, and microcredit support. The first pilot project covered 80 boreholes. In 2009, a private maintenance company was scheduled to be contracted for 621 boreholes in central Senegal. By January 2010, all of the country's 1,400 boreholes were expected to be covered by private maintenance contracts.

== History and recent developments ==
=== First public-private partnership (1960–1971) ===
1960–1971: The Compagnie Générale des Eaux du Sénégal, a subsidiary of France's Compagnie Générale des Eaux, oversees urban water supply in Senegal under a lease.

=== Public management (1971–mid-1990s) ===
1971: Under President Léopold Senghor, an advocate of African socialism, Senegal nationalizes its water company as Société Nationale d'Exploitation des Eaux du Sénégal (SONEES). In rural areas, water is provided free of charge.

1983: Under President Abdou Diouf (1981-2000), SONEES signs a concession contract with the government. In rural areas, water tariffs are introduced with flat fees per household.

1994: The government begins a year-long process of designing sector reforms, including a series of workshops and advice from the World Bank and an assessment of reforms in other countries.

=== Second public-private partnership (since the mid-1990s) ===
1995: The government decides to delegate urban water service to the private sector under a lease.

1996: SONEES is dissolved, and three new companies are created: Société Nationale des Eaux du Sénégal (SONES, the state asset-holding company), Sénégalaise des Eaux (SDE, a private operating company), and the Office National de l'Assainissement du Sénégal (ONAS, the public sanitation company). SONES owns the assets and is in charge of investments in infrastructure and the regulation of SDE. SDE is responsible for operation, regular maintenance, some investment for system expansion, and billing and collection.

1998: SONES and SDE renegotiate several unattainable targets in the contract without arbitration or litigation.

1998: A Conseil Supérieur de l'Eau, run by the Prime Minister, is created to set policies for water-resource management and water supply.

1999: The pilot project REGEFOR is initiated in central Senegal with the support of the French Development Agency (AFD) to develop new management principles based on the disengagement of the state in favor of users and the private sector: metering, volumetric pricing, trained managers and technicians and clear relationships between the actors.

2000: Change of government after presidential elections won by opposition leader Abdoulaye Wade.

2001: Second letter of development policy and effectiveness of the World Bank-supported Long-Term Water Sector Project. Water and sanitation policies lack major changes.

2002: Sénégalaise Des Eaux is certified according to the ISO 9001 norm (version 2000) by the French association for quality assurance AFAQ. SDE is the first Senegalese company with an ISO certification and the first African company certified according to the ISO 9001 norm based on customer-satisfaction management.

2005: Third letter of development policy. The Water and Sanitation Program for the Millennium (PEPAM) is created. In rural areas, the pilot project REGEFOR is completed successfully and its approach is introduced at the national level.

2006: Lease with SDE is extended for five years. A performance contract is signed with SONES.

2008: The government signs a performance contract with ONAS.

2009: The government commissions a study to assess (among other issues) whether the lease should evolve into a concession agreement under which the private company finances some (or all) of the investments.

2010/11: SAUR sells its share in SDE to the West African infrastructure holding company Finagestion, which is majority-owned by the US-based, Africa-focused private equity fund Emerging Capital Partners.

2011: The lease with SDE is extended by two years.

2012: Macky Sall is elected president, defeating Abdoulaye Wade.

September 2013: Dakar's water supply is interrupted for three weeks after a break in a key transmission pipeline in Keur Momar Sarr Arrondissement.

2014: The lease with SDE is extended by five years.

== Financial aspects and efficiency ==
The sector's financial policy, defined in 1994, is based on the following principles:

- The only support from the state is donor financing; there are no ongoing operating subsidies.
- There will be no excessive increases in water tariffs; tariff increases are gradual, based on a financial model.
- There is a social tariff (the subsidized first block of the tariff for consumption under 10 m^{3} per month) to ensure affordability.

=== Tariffs and cost recovery ===
SDE applies an increasing-block tariff, which includes three blocks:

- A social tariff for low-consumption users with house connections, defined as those using less than 20 cubic meters every 60 days (191 F.CFA/m^{3} in 2008).
- A regular tariff for consumption between 20 and 40 cubic meters (formerly 20-100 cubic meters), 630 F.CFA/m^{3} in 2008.
- A "dissuasive" rate for consumption over 40 cubic meters (formerly 100 cubic meters), 789 F.CFA/m^{3} in 2008.

In Dakar, water is also sold in buckets at standpipes. Guardians of standpipes are small entrepreneurs who buy water from the utility and sell it to customers.

Public Citizen has criticized Senegal's tariff structure because the poorest (who tend to rely on standpipes) pay the highest tariff, "which amounts to 350 percent of the social tariff". Families in low-income areas may share one connection, and consume at the "dissuasive" rate. According to Public Citizen, the poorest families subsidize the water of families who use normal amounts of water and qualify for the "social" tariff.

According to a World Bank study, standpipe users pay more for water but the government sees them as a temporary solution and intends to reach all the poor with private connections. This policy has a "major flaw", however: the criteria that make a household eligible for the subsidy more or less guarantee that it is not poor. Social connection programs are intended for stable neighborhoods where residents have established themselves. To obtain a social connection, an applicant must have title to the land and a house must be located on it. A household that can afford this, and can afford to build a permanent house, is not among the poorest of the poor.

Price increases have been limited to three percent per year under the performance targets (the rate of inflation), keeping tariffs constant in real terms. The average water tariff increased from 350 F.CFA/m^{3} in 1995 ($0.72/m^{3} at the exchange rate of 489 CFA/US$) to 496 F.CFA/m^{3} (US$1.09/m^{3} at the exchange rate of 456 CFA/m^{3}) in 2007.

The financial costs for water supply are recovered, which is unusual for a water utility in sub-Saharan Africa. Interest-free long-term loans by international financial institutions to the Senegalese government are lent to the asset holding company and recovered from users through billing by SDE.

A sanitation surcharge of $0.05/m^{3} is levied by SDE for ONAS on water customers in all cities with a sewer network. The surcharge is six percent of the water bill for households using 50 m^{3} per month of water. Revenue from the surcharge is insufficient to finance ONAS operations and maintain sewer and drainage networks. Achieving financial sustainability for ONAS and finding means to devote resources for on-site sanitation promotion and development remain a challenge.

Although municipalities are not responsible for sanitary or stormwater drainage, they are expected to transfer a portion of the property tax ($500,000) to ONAS through the equipment fund for municipalities to finance the operation and maintenance of drainage facilities. However, these resources were not made available to ONAS.

Tariff collection by SDE reached 98 percent, according to a World Bank source, up from less than 80 percent before the project. According to SDE and another World Bank source, the tariff collection rate averaged 98 percent from 2001 to 2006; it was 96 percent in 1996. According to another source, the 1996 collection rate was 91 percent.

In rural areas, communities contribute 20 percent to initial investment and 80 percent is financed by the government. Operation, maintenance, and replacement costs are recovered through revenue.

=== Investments and financing ===
The Senegalese government said that financing equivalent to 260 billion F.CFA (about $500 million in 2008) was mobilized between 1996 and 2006 through the Projet Sectoriel Eau (PSE) and Projet Eau à Long Terme (PELT). According to other reports, $300 million was invested in Senegal's water partnership. According to the World Bank, the cost of the Senegal Water Project (including sanitation) was $290 million; IDA provided $100 million and another $125 million for the follow-up Long Term Water Sector Project. The PEPAM budget for 2005-2015 was 515 billion F.CFA (about $1 billion): 274 billion F.CFA for rural areas and 241 billion F.CFA for urban areas.

Most investments in the sector are financed by donors with zero-interest loans from the World Bank's International Development Association and the African Development Bank or grants from other donors, complemented by government funds. Investments of $20 million were financed by the private operator over the first ten years of the lease. In 1996, Citibank and the Compagnie Bancaire de l'Afrique Occidentale (CBAO) provided a credit line of $21.4 million (11 billion F.CFA) over six years to assist the asset-holding company SONES with its cash flow.

=== Efficiency ===
Water losses, mostly from leakage, dropped to less than 20 percent in 2006 from 32 percent in 1996. The decline translates into savings equal to the water needs of 930,000 people. Labor productivity was 2.3. employees per 1,000 connections in 2014, up from 6.1 in 1996.

== External cooperation ==
The World Bank, the United States Agency for International Development (USAID), the African Development Bank, the European Investment Bank, the French Development Agency (AFD), Germany, and the West African Development Bank (BOAD) are among the Senegalese water sector's largest donors. In 1995, the World Bank provided a $100 million IDA credit to the government of Senegal to implement its reforms. It was followed by a $125 million long-term water sector project which began in June 2001. In 2006, it approved a $7.7 million output-based aid project to support access to on-site sanitation services in Dakar which was implemented by ONAS, the public works agency AGETIP and an NGO.

The European Investment Bank (EIB) has granted two loans (€15 million in 1995 and €16 million in 2001) to the Senegalese government under the long-term water project to finance water-supply services in Dakar. In November 2007 the EIB signed two additional financing agreements with SONES in support of Senegal's National Drinking Water and Sewerage Programme for the Millennium (PEPAM). A European Development Fund (EDF) subsidy of CFAF 5.7 billion (€8.6 million) and an EIB loan of F.CFA 9.8 billion (€15 million) complete SONES's investment programme of F.CFA 38 billion (€58 million). Under the project, more than 60 urban centres (including Dakar) will benefit from schemes to rehabilitate, upgrade and extend the drinking-water supply network, reaching more than 500,000 people over four years. The planned work includes the creation of 25 new boreholes, construction of a water-treatment plant, extension of the supply network by more than 500 kilometres (310 mi) and installation of 50,000 subsidized connections and 360 standpipes. The four finance providers have harmonized their procedures, implementing commitments made in the Paris Declaration on the harmonization of development aid.

Another €64.5 million European Investment Bank loan, combined with a €5.55 million European Union grant to Senegal, was made in 2023. The funding will provide drinking water to Saint-Louis residents and two communities in central and southern Senegal: Kaolack and Kolda. By the completion of the project, Saint-Louis will benefit from a new drinking-water treatment plant, reservoirs for storage, and enlargement of the distribution network. This is aligned with the African Sustainable Cities Initiative. The €5.55 million European Union fund, mobilized by the European Investment Bank, will assist Senegal's water utility in accelerating its 35,000 subsidised drinking-water connections for 350,000 customers across the country.

== See also ==
- Water supply and sanitation in sub-Saharan Africa
