= Social Security Advisory Committee =

The Social Security Advisory Committee (SSAC) is a statutory body that provides impartial advice to the UK government on social security issues. When the SSAC reports on government proposals for regulations the report must be presented to Parliament together with the regulations and a statement from the Secretary of State for Work and Pensions responding to any recommendations.

== History ==
The committee was formed in November 1980 and is now covered by the Social Security Administration Act 1992. It took over the advisory functions of the former Great Britain and Northern Ireland Supplementary Benefits Commissions and the National Insurance Advisory Committee, and also assumed advisory responsibility for family income supplement and child benefit which had not previously come within the scope of any advisory committee. The Social Security and Housing Benefits Act 1982 extended the committee's responsibilities to cover advice on the new housing benefit scheme, replacing the Advisory Committee on Rent Rebates and Rent Allowances (ACRRRA) from April 1983.

== Notable members ==
=== Chairs ===
- Stephen Brien (2020–present)
- Liz Sayce (2019–2020)
- Professor Sir Ian Diamond (2018–2019)
- Paul Gray (2011–2018 )
- Deep Sagar (2011)
- Sir Richard Tilt (2004–2011)
- Sir Thomas Boyd-Carpenter (1995-2004)
- Sir Michael Bett (1993–1995)
- Sir Peter Barclay (1984–1993)
- Sir Arthur Armitage (1980–1984)

=== Members ===
- Jacob Meagher (2024–2029)
- Professor Olive Stevenson (1982–2002)
- Professor Stephen Hardy (2023–)
