= Richard Tilt =

British public servant (born 1944)

Sir Robin Richard Tilt (born 11 March 1944) is a British public servant. Formerly a prison governor, he served as Director General of Her Majesty's Prison Service (1996–99), Social Fund Commissioner (2000–09), Chairman of the Social Security Advisory Committee (2004–11) and Independent Chair of the Internet Watch Foundation (2012–17). He was appointed a Knight Bachelor in the 1999 Birthday Honours.

== Education ==
Tilt was educated at the King's School, Worcester and the University of Nottingham.

== Career ==
=== Prison Service ===
Tilt first worked within Her Majesty's Prison Service, as an Assistant Governor, in 1966. He served as Governor of HM Prison Bedford and HM Prison Gartree. Following the removal of Derek Lewis, Director General of the Prison Service, Tilt became acting Director General in October 1995, and was formally appointed Director General on 1 April 1996, retiring in 1999.

Tilt was a member of the Sentencing Advisory Panel from 1999 to 2002.

Tilt was a panelist at a conference of individuals involved within the Prison Services, meeting to discuss and vote on issues regarding the Chaucer Unit. The Chaucer unit was created in order to investigate the services of Kent for instances of corruption and serious misconduct, as a consequence of the so-called ATM scam within HM Prison Blantyre House.

Tilt gave evidence to the inquiry into the death of Ulster loyalist Billy Wright, regarding the validity of a decision to house imprisoned individuals of the Loyalist Volunteer Force and the Irish National Liberation Army together within HM Prison Maze, giving this evidence on 10 December 2008.

=== National Health Service and Social Security ===
He served as chairman of the following National Health Service trusts and authorities:

- Kettering General Hospital NHS Trust (1999–2000)
- Northamptonshire Health Authority (2000–02)
- Leicestershire, Northamptonshire and Rutland Strategic Health Authority (2002–06)

Appointed as Social Fund Commissioner for Great Britain and Northern Ireland in December 2000, Tilt served in this part-time post until 2009. He was also elected to chair the Social Security Advisory Committee in 2004, serving two terms, his second term ending on 31 March 2011.

In 2000, Sir Richard Tilt chaired a review (the Tilt Review) of security at the three high-security hospitals in England (Ashworth, Broadmoor and Rampton). The Tilt Review suggested increased security measures, and altogether made 86 recommendations, all of which were subsequently accepted by the government. Following a critique of the Tilt Review by Tim Exworthy and John Gunn in the British Journal of Psychiatry, Tilt published a response in June 2003.

=== Internet Watch Foundation ===
Tilt was appointed Independent Chair of the Internet Watch Foundation in January 2012.

His six-year term as chair ended at the end of December 2017.

== Other responsibilities ==
He was governor of De Montfort University from 2001 to 2010.
