= Social Fund Commissioner =

United Kingdom government office

The Social Fund Commissioner was an office created under United Kingdom social security legislation in 1986 to lead the Social Fund. They were intended to be independent of the government department responsible for social security provision. The office-holder was appointed by the Secretary of State and was the head of the Independent Review Service, located in Birmingham, the headquarters of the Social Fund Inspectors of Great Britain. There was also a small inspectorate in Belfast, Northern Ireland.

== Social Fund Commissioners (1987–2013) ==
There have been four individuals who have held the post of Social Fund Commissioner since the Social Fund scheme was introduced until its abolition in April 2013. Each individual was appointed as the Social Fund Commissioner for both Great Britain and for Northern Ireland.

- Rosalind Mackworth CBE (1987–1995)
- John Scampion CBE (1995–2000)
- Sir Richard Tilt (2000–2009)
- Karamjit Singh CBE (2009–2013)
