= Canon ELPH =

Canon ELPH may refer to:

- Canon Digital IXUS series, sold as the PowerShot Digital ELPH in US and Canada
- Canon ELPH (series), introduced in 1996
