= Social Fund (UK) =

Former UK welfare benefit

The Social Fund in the UK was a form of welfare benefit provision payable for exceptional or intermittent needs, in addition to regular payments such as Jobseeker's Allowance or Income Support.

The United Kingdom coalition government abolished the discretionary social fund with effect from April 2013, by means of legislation contained in the Welfare Reform Act 2012. Community care grants and crisis loans were abolished from April 2013 and instead funding was made available to local authorities in England and to the devolved administrations to provide such assistance in their areas as they saw fit.

== Introduction ==
There were two categories of Social Fund:

1. a ‘discretionary’ social fund intended to respond flexibly to meet exceptional and intermittent needs; and
2. a ‘regulated’ fund intended to cover maternity, funeral, winter fuel and heating expenses.

The social fund schemes were implemented in 1987 to 1988, as part of an overall review of benefits (the Fowler reviews) initiated by Norman Fowler, the Secretary of State for Health and Social Security (1981–1987), replacing the former system of Single Payments of Supplementary Benefit.

There were three payments:

1. ‘Budgeting Loans’ to meet intermittent needs (more automatic and less discretionary since 1998);
2. ‘Crisis loans’ for emergency situations; and
3. ‘Community care grants’ to help vulnerable people live independently rather than enter care institutions (part of a wider strategy to promote care in the community and link ‘cash’ and ‘care’ provision).

The merits of each application were considered taking into account: the nature of the need; the existence of available resources; the possibility there is a more suitable provider; and the budgetary allocation.

The complaints procedure relevant to the discretionary social fund differed from regular appeal arrangements. Reviews carried out by frontline staff could be further reviewed by the Social Fund Inspectors (SFIs) of the Independent Review Service (IRS), which is part of the Department for Work and Pensions, and managed by a Social Fund Commissioner appointed by the Minister. The SFIs' review applies both a merits and judicial review test. The details of the discretionary social fund are set out in ‘directions’, an unusual form of secondary legislation.

== History ==
In the 1980s, the government's policy shifted between a discretionary approach to one based upon more concrete legal entitlement. The means-tested Supplementary Benefits scheme was revised in 1980 to include the provision of 'Single Payments' and 'Additional Requirements' which were disbursed according to detailed criteria contained in complex Regulations made under the primary legislation. These payments replaced previous discretionary payments. However, by the time of the Fowler reviews in 1983 government policy had once again embraced discretion as its main method of delivering means-tested benefit to cover exceptional and intermittent needs that were not accounted for by the mainstream welfare benefits.

A Green Paper published in June 1985 proposed a new Social Fund to be administered by the Department for Health and Social Services (DHSS) on a discretionary basis to give more flexible help to those in need. The new policy was also prompted by the fact that in recent years there had been spiralling expenditure incurred by claims for single payments. The original policy in the Green Paper was to provide a budget-limited Fund to help in four areas of need: community care needs; budgeting expenses; maternity and funeral expenses; and expenses arising from financial crises. A White Paper followed in December 1985. The White Paper proposed a set Social Fund grant to meet maternity needs (replacing the pre-existing £25 maternity grant along with single payments provision for maternity needs). Similarly, there would be a set Social Fund grant to meet funeral needs (replacing the £30 death grant, and these payments would be contingent on three new 'income-related' benefits, i.e. Income Support, Family Credit or Housing Benefit. Social Fund grants for maternity and funeral needs would be based on clear, objective criteria and payments would not be constrained by the budget; they would be paid automatically on satisfying the qualifying conditions. In addition, it proposed Social Fund loans to meet 'intermittent expenses'. These would be determined on a discretionary basis of what was reasonable in all the circumstances and the likelihood of recovery of the loan. It also proposed a loans scheme to cover financial crises, for example, where money/benefits had been lost or stolen, or where there was an urgent need for funds following flood or fire. As regards this form of loan the White Paper confirmed these would not be restricted to those receiving Income Support.

== The introduction of the Social Fund ==
The resulting legislation, the Social Security Act 1986 (c. 50), reflected the policy development described above, subject to a number of changes made during the passage of the 1986 Bill. A phased introduction of the regulated Social Fund in April 1987 and the discretionary Social Fund in April 1988 followed. The latter scheme was particularly controversial at the time. The Council on Tribunals, for example, had issued a highly critical special report in 1986 which challenged the government's intention to dispense with an independent appeal mechanism. Consequently, during the passage of the Bill, the social fund review (originally envisaged as merely a management administrative review) was enhanced by the creation of 'social fund inspectors' (SFIs) who would be given jurisdiction to further review a 'social fund officer's' (SFO's) review of an SFO's original determination. In order to further entrench the independence of the SFIs, a new officer - the Social Fund Commissioner - to be appointed by the Secretary of State, was included in the legislation. There were also criticisms of the plans to provide the details of the discretionary social fund scheme in the form of 'directions' (an unusual form of delegated legislation) and 'guidance'. A draft Social Fund Manual appeared in 1987 and drew further criticism. The Social Security Advisory Committee (SSAC) took the view that the Social Fund Manual put too much emphasis on the consideration that decision-makers would have to make to the budgetary aspects which it argued went beyond the parameters of the legislation.

The discretionary social fund scheme came into force on April 11, 1988. A notable feature was that the rules concerning eligibility, repeat applications, exclusions, qualification, maximum and minimum rules and capital rules, were set out in Social Fund Directions issued by the Secretary of State, whereas the legal provisions controlling the exercise of 'discretion' was retained in primary legislation: see now section 140 of the Social Security Contributions and Benefits Act 1992.

== The regulated Social Fund ==
=== Maternity expenses ===
A Sure Start Maternity Grant is intended to help pay for the immediate needs of a new baby if you are getting a specified benefit or tax credit. See generally, the DWP guidance at: http://www.dwp.gov.uk/publications/specialist-guides/technical-guidance/sb16-a-guide-to-the-social/sure-start-maternity-grants/

A Sure Start Maternity Grant is paid from the Social Fund as a lump sum, and is not repayable. The grant is £500 in respect of each baby for whom an award is made.

== The discretionary Social Fund ==
=== Community care grants ===
Community care grants (CCGs) were primarily intended to help vulnerable people live as independent a life as possible in the community. They were awarded to households receiving means-tested benefits such as Jobseeker's Allowance. The prime objectives were to:

1. help people to establish themselves in the community following a stay in institutional or residential care;
2. help people remain in the community rather than enter institutional or residential care;
3. help with the care of a prisoner or young offender on release on temporary licence;
4. ease exceptional pressures on families e.g. the breakdown of a relationship (especially if involving domestic violence) or onset of a disability, or a calamity such as fire or flooding;
5. help people setting up home as a part of a resettlement programme following e.g. time in a homeless hostel or temporary accommodation; or
6. assist with certain travelling expenses e.g. for funerals of a family member or hospital visiting.

In making a determination on a claim for a CCG the decision-maker (DM) must follow the relevant legislation (including the Social Fund Directions), and must also take account of the national and local guidance, i.e. the Social Fund Guide (SFG) and the appropriate Area Decision Maker's (ADM) guidance. This approach also applies to BLs and CLs (see below).

=== Budgeting loans ===
Budgeting loans (BLs) are intended to help those on means-tested benefits to spread the cost of intermittent expenses over a longer period. It is an interest-free loan. The Social Fund Directions make clear that the purpose of the loan is to help meet intermittent expenses which the applicant has difficulty in budgeting for.

The structure of the BL scheme was subsequently adjusted several times. Buck identifies four periods of policy development. The key development was the move in 1999 to a so-called 'fact-based' approach. The effect of these changes in essence was to severely limit the discretion involved by DMs in making BL determinations. The changes also involved less focus on the scrutiny of the applicant's need for particular items.

=== Crisis loans (CLs) ===
Crisis loans (CLs) were intended to help those who have an urgent financial crisis: for example, in consequence of an emergency or disaster such as a fire or flood. CLs are interest-free loans, but unlike BLs, there is no requirement for an applicant to be in receipt of one of the qualifying benefits. The Social Fund Directions make it clear that the overall purpose of CLs was to help meet expenses in an emergency or disaster where there is no other means to prevent a serious health and safety risk to the applicant or their family.

CLs were to be used not only to cover specific items needed in a financial crisis, but also to cover living expenses, for example, where there has been an interruption to the usual flow of benefit income. Such payments were known as 'alignment' CLs. One significant policy development was to allow applicants to make telephone applications as an alternative to written applications in 2002.

== The Social Fund review ==
One of the reasons for the controversy surrounding the introduction of the discretionary Social Fund had been the initial plan to forego any appeal mechanism in favour of an internal management review of decision-making. During the later stages of the parliamentary passage of the legislation, the Government conceded to the increasing pressure for some kind of external, independent review, albeit one which differed from the tribunal appeal model that had been a hallmark of the British social security system since the 1930s. The Social Security Act 1986 created 'social fund inspectors' (SFIs) to undertake external reviews of the frontline 'decision-makers' (DMs) who made the initial determination on social fund applications.

== Abolition of the discretionary Social Fund ==
The Welfare Reform Act 2012 included changes to the discretionary Social Fund to occur after April 2013. In particular:

1. Community care grants, crisis loans and budgeting loans were abolished.
2. Community care grants, and crisis loans (for items and general living expenses) were replaced by a new localised service, from April 2013. In England this service was to be delivered by local authorities (See Local welfare assistance scheme). Funding was made available to local authorities in England and to the devolved administrations to provide such assistance in their areas as they saw fit The funding was not 'ring-fenced' for any purpose, but the government set out in a 'settlement letter' to local authorities what it expected the funding to be used for, the underlying principles, and expected outcomes.

The arrangements for Scotland and Wales were to be determined by the respective devolved Governments.

1. Crisis loan alignment payments (and interim payments of benefit) were replaced by a single system of short-term advances.
2. Budgeting loans were to continue for people on income-related benefits until they transferred to Universal Credit, and were then to be abolished once Universal Credit had been fully rolled out.
3. Budgeting advances were to be available to eligible recipients of Universal Credit - these would be a payment on account of benefit. This would eventually be replicated in Pension Credit.
4. The role of the Social Fund Commissioner would be abolished at some point after April 2013.

Pressure groups and welfare rights organisations voiced major concerns about the localisation of elements of the Social Fund. As well as concerns about the lack of ring-fencing, there were doubts about whether the funding to be transferred to local authorities would be sufficient to meet the needs of people in their areas.'.

== Disambiguation ==
The Social Fund (UK) should not be confused with social funds in developing countries (sometimes also called Social Investment Fund, Social Fund for Development, Social Action Fund, National Solidarity Fund or Social Development Agency), or with the European Social Fund.
