= Rosalind Mackworth =

British solicitor and public servant (1928–2020)

Rosalind Mackworth CBE
- Born: 10 August 1928
- Died: 19 February 2020 (aged 91)
- Occupations: Solicitor and public servant

Rosalind Jean Mackworth, CBE (10 August 1928 – 19 February 2020) was a British solicitor and public servant. She was chair of the Judicial Commission of the European Union of Women from 1984 to 1987, and served as the first Social Fund Commissioner from 1987 to 1996. Having qualified as a solicitor in 1956, she worked at Gregory Rowcliffe before setting up her own practice in 1967. She amalgamated her practice into Mackworth Rowland in 1982 and that incorporated into Ashley Wilson Solicitors in 2006.

In the 1994 New Year Honours, Mackworth was appointed Commander of the Order of the British Empire (CBE) in recognition of her work as Social Fund Commissioner for Great Britain and for Northern Ireland.
