= Ashworth Hospital =

- Mersey Care NHS Foundation Trust
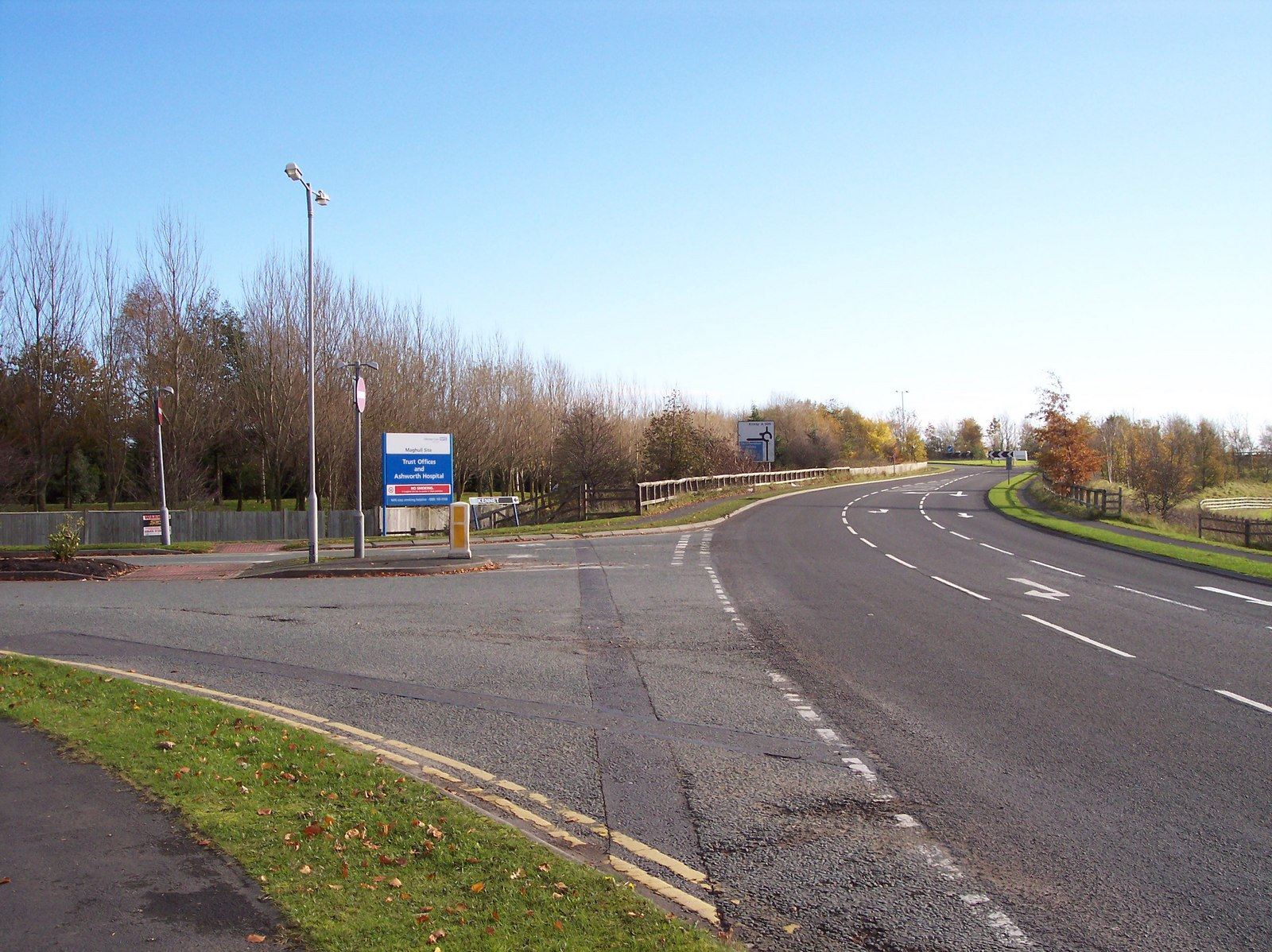
- Entrance to Ashworth Hospital off School Lane

- Location in Merseyside

Geography
- Location: Maghull, England
- Coordinates: 53.52019°N 2.91094°W

Organisation
- Care system: NHS
- Type: Psychiatric

Services
- Emergency department: No

Links
- Website: www.merseycare.nhs.uk/ashworth-hospital

Ashworth Hospital is a high-security psychiatric hospital in Maghull, 10 miles (16 km) northeast of Liverpool. It is a part of Mersey Care NHS Foundation Trust, catering to patients with psychiatric health needs that require treatment in conditions of high security.

The hospital is one of four psychiatric hospitals in the United Kingdom providing psychiatric care within conditions of high security, and one of three in England (alongside Broadmoor Hospital in Crowthorne and Rampton Secure Hospital near Woodbeck). For Scotland and Northern Ireland, the facility meeting the same high security environment is the State Hospital in Carstairs.

== Organisation ==
Ashworth is one of the three high-security psychiatric hospitals in England and Wales, alongside Rampton and Broadmoor, that exist to work with people who require treatment due to their "dangerous, violent or criminal propensities", with the majority experiencing psychotic conditions such as schizophrenia, comorbid or other personality disorders. Ashworth currently has 14 wards. Five locked wards constitute the personality disorder unit. A wide variety of pharmacological, rehabilitative and psychological treatments are available. Rehabilitative and creative activity is supported with patients frequently entering work for the Koestler awards winning 27 prizes in 2011. In collaboration with The Reader Organisation reading groups have been set up in which staff and patients read literature together, promoting confidence and developing communication and other skills.

== History ==
=== Early history ===
The hospital has its origins in Moss Side House, a convalescent home for children from Liverpool's workhouses, which was established on the site in 1878. For the duration of the First World War, it became Moss Side Military Hospital, the first specialist hospital for the treatment of what is now known as post-traumatic stress disorder. Moss Side became a special hospital in 1933. In 1974, overcrowding at Broadmoor led to the construction of Park Lane Special Hospital on land at the facility. In 1989, Moss Side and Park Lane hospitals merged to form Ashworth Hospital. The name "Ashworth Hospital" was chosen by a ballot among patients and staff.

=== Industrial action ===
In 1987, members of the Prison Officers Association, which then represented almost all the nurses were involved in a dispute during which more than 200 patients were locked in their rooms for 23 hours per day for 10 days.

=== Blom-Cooper Inquiry ===
Following a 1988 television documentary which alleged that a patient, Sean Walton, had died after being beaten by staff allegedly with a snooker cue and a series of other serious allegations, a Committee of Inquiry into Complaints about Ashworth Hospital, Merseyside, headed by Sir Louis Blom-Cooper, was set up; it published its findings in 1992. Blom-Cooper was highly critical of the regime, which was felt to be more custodial than therapeutic, describing the regime as a "brutalising, stagnant, closed institution." The inquiry uncovered evidence of physical and psychological abuse of patients. Nurses had used a pig's head to intimidate patients, had placed pictures of brains in the locker of a patient who had undergone brain surgery, and had submerged one patient under water to test his breaking point. Extreme right-wing propaganda had been on prominent display. The inquiry report suggested, only half-jokingly, that international torture monitors should visit the hospital. Seven staff and two managers were relieved of their duties. Prof. Robert Bluglass, who was the medical member of the inquiry, concluded that all the Special Hospitals should be closed.

In 1993, a patients' advocacy service was set up in the hospital. This was the first mental health advocacy service to be introduced in a high security hospital in the United Kingdom.

=== Fallon Inquiry ===
In 1997, a patient absconded from a day rehabilitation trip in protest against his treatment and the management of the Personality Disorder Unit. He made multiple allegations including that pornography, drugs and alcohol were freely available, that patients were running businesses, that a child had been put at risk of abuse at the hands of a number of paedophiles, that security had been compromised, and that a number of staff were corrupt. The Fallon Inquiry was set up and reported in 1999. The inquiry found that Child A had visited the hospital on hundreds of occasions and had spent periods dressed only in her underwear with a patient with a history of violent sexual assaults against young girls. The patient had also visited the child at her home whilst escorted by a nurse. The nurse had taken pictures of the child for the patient, including one of her on her bed and another of her on the lavatory. Child A's father also took the young son of a friend to visit a second patient found guilty of kidnapping, sexual torture, mutilation, and murder of a 13-year-old boy. The inquiry team reported that Dr John Reed, chairman of the Reed Committee on Mentally Disordered Offenders, described a conversation with Prof Pamela Taylor, then head of medical services of the special hospitals, in which the doctors at Ashworth were described as follows: "Doctor 1: moderately capable but with a serious alcohol problem. Doctor 2: moderately capable but feeble. Doctor 3: appalling. Doctor 4: never there. Doctor 5: weak. Doctor 6: made very poor provision for patients on the ward. Doctor 7: lazy. Doctor 8: unstable and not clinically good. There were three competent doctors." The Fallon inquiry recommended that the hospital should close.

As a result of the Fallon Inquiry, a review into security was undertaken by Sir Richard Tilt, who recommended in May 2000 that security be upgraded to that of a Category B prison.

=== The Swann Report ===
Another inquiry, The Swann Report, was also conducted in the 1990s in relation to the overuse of drugs, but the results are unavailable.

=== European Committee for the Prevention of Torture inspection ===
As part of the 2016 review of the United Kingdom as a whole the European Committee for the Prevention of Torture and Inhuman or Degrading treatment or Punishment (CPT) visited Ashworth Hospital. The conclusions included that living conditions were variable. The CPT expressed serious concerns relating to the necessity and application of the use of Long Term Segregation (LTS), finding that some patients were kept in LTS for years at a time. It found that some patients were unable to access outside areas on a daily basis. The CPT expressed misgiving about the use of overwhelming force deployed at Ashworth including the use of personal protective equipment, helmets and shields. The committee also found that night-time confinement was being used. This is a policy in which all patients are locked in their rooms between the hours of 9.15p.m. and 7.15a.m, with the aim of saving money. The committee considered that the systematic locking-in of patients, amounting to ten hours of de facto seclusion, was not acceptable in a care establishment provided there was sufficient staff. It also found that the original intention of increasing day-time activities had not been realised. At the time of the CPT inspection there were; 12 consultant psychiatrists, a general practitioner and 3.8 FTE other doctors. There were 10 clinical psychologists, seven approved social workers, two dieticians and a range of other staff including six modern matrons, five nurse managers, 24 charge nurses, 173 registered mental health nurses and 254 healthcare support workers and assistants.

=== CQC inspection 2013 ===
The CQC inspection of 2013 found that the services were good for all domains; the services provided were caring, responsive and well-led.

== Patients of note ==
- Ian Brady, the principal perpetrator of the "Moors murders," who was at Ashworth for more than 30 years after being transferred from a mainstream prison in November 1985. Brady remained there until his death in May 2017, at which point he had been in custody for more than 50 years.
- Valdo Calocane, the perpetrator of the 2023 Nottingham attacks, in which three people were killed and a further three people were injured. On 25 January 2024, he was sentenced to be detained indefinitely in hospital.
- Dale Cregan, convicted of murdering four people (including two female police officers) in Greater Manchester during 2012. He was transferred from a mainstream prison shortly after his conviction in 2013.
- Sandra Riley, a serial killer who murdered her own children.
- Charles Salvador, an armed robber, born as Michael Peterson and formerly known as Charles Bronson.
- Robert Sartin, who was responsible for the Monkseaton shootings in April 1989, where one man was killed and 14 other people were injured.
- Barry Williams, also known as Harry Street, a multiple murderer, who spent 15 years there after a killing spree in West Bromwich in 1978. He was returned to the hospital in 2014 for firearms offences and making threats against a neighbour in Birmingham, and died from a heart attack shortly after returning to Ashworth.

== See also ==
- List of hospitals in England

== Sources ==
- Bronson, Charles; Ackroyd, Robin (2000). Bronson. London: John Blake Publishing Ltd. p. 167. ISBN 1-85782-393-1.
