= Advanced Photo System =

Still image film format

Advanced Photo System logo

Advanced Photo System (APS) is a film format for consumer still photography first marketed in 1996 and discontinued in 2011. It was sold by various manufacturers under several brand names, including Eastman Kodak (Advantix), FujiFilm (Nexia), Agfa (Futura) and Konica (Centuria). Development was led by Kodak starting in the mid-1980s.

Like prior attempts to displace 135 film from the amateur photography market, including 126 film (Instamatic), 110, and disc, APS used a film cartridge to reduce loading errors. APS also could reduce camera and lens size and weight by using a smaller image format; unlike the older amateur formats, image quality would be maintained by using newly developed films, featuring emulsions with finer grain size and a flatter base material. The other major innovation delivered by APS was the "information exchange" process in which the camera recorded data directly on the film; this would simplify cropping prints to a desired aspect ratio and potentially could provide photofinishers with exposure data to optimize print quality. However, by the time APS was released in 1996, the first digital cameras had appeared, providing many of the same benefits with the additional convenience and economy of eliminating the developing process.

== History ==
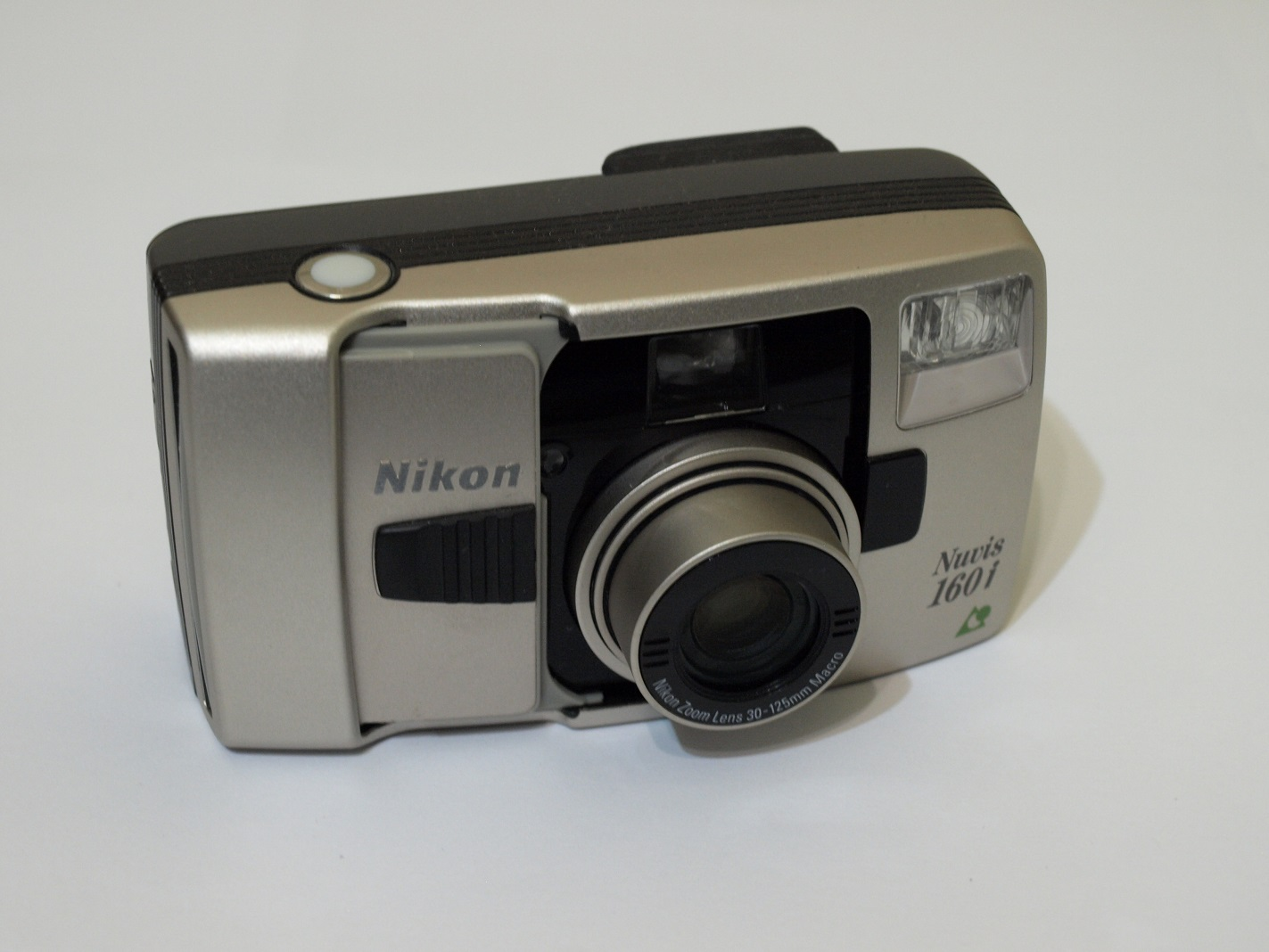
Nikon Nuvis 160i, an APS camera

Kodak began developing "Project Orion" in the mid-1980s and solicited partners starting in the late 1980s. In 1991, Canon, Fujifilm, Kodak, Minolta, and Nikon formed a consortium to complete the new photographic system, and the alliance was publicly announced in 1992. Initial testing of APS film cartridges with 40-exposure rolls started in 1994; details about the magnetic-stripe information encoding and formats were provided later that year, although the prototype "Standard" frame size, at that time, was narrower than the final APS-C frame, with a 7:5 aspect ratio, 23.4×16.7 mm (0.92×0.66 in). APS was announced to the photofinishing market in October 1995 and officially launched at the Photo Marketing Association show in Las Vegas in February 1996. At that time, Kodak CEO George M. C. Fisher announced that US$500 million had been invested in the new system to date, and an equal expense would be required going forward.

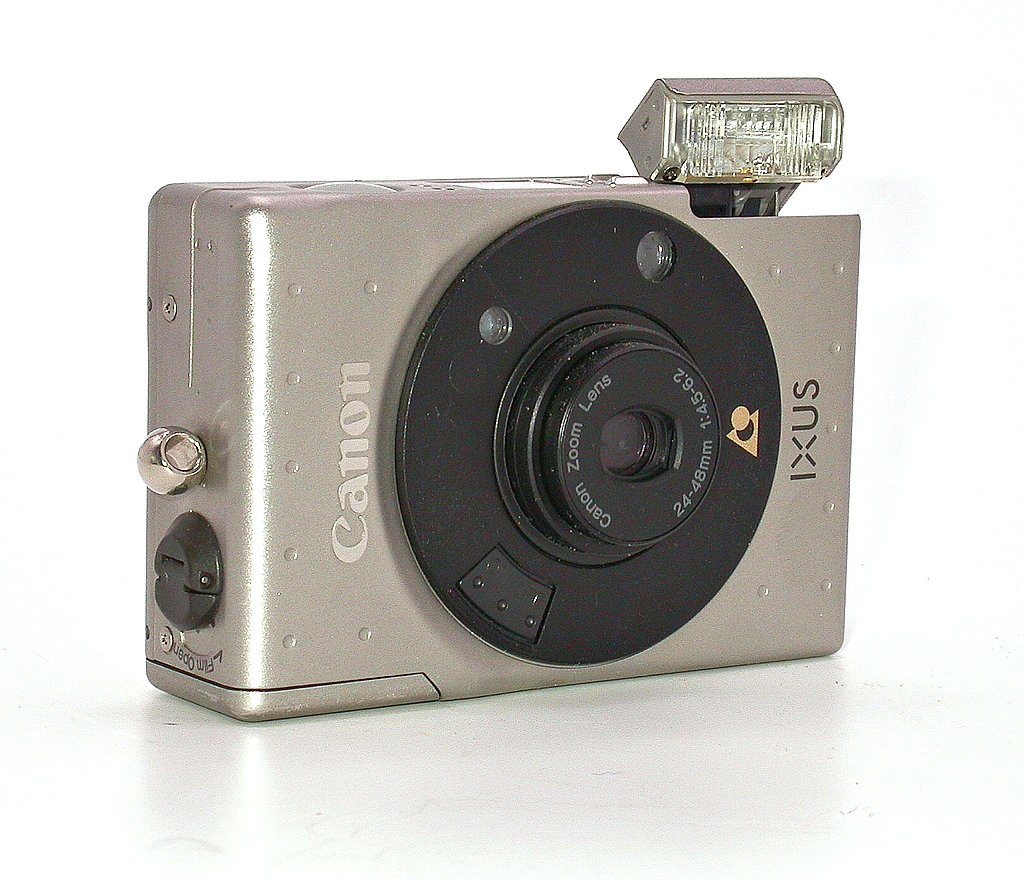
Canon ELPH aka IXUS (Europe) or IXY (Japan)

The Advanced Photo System was an attempt at a major upgrade of photographic technology for amateurs, resulting in a new film cartridge to facilitate automation of film loading and rewinding; according to Kodak, 1/5 of all film that it received for processing showed some defects attributable to loading error. In addition, the smaller film size potentially could result in APS point-and-shoot cameras with greater zoom ranges in the same size as existing 35 mm compact cameras, or more compact altogether. Accessories were made to facilitate digitization of APS film for use with computers, including a slideshow device for televisions and film scanner. At launch, all five manufacturers announced point-and-shoot APS cameras; the Canon ELPH (IXY/IXUS) drew particular attention and demand for its compact size and stylish all-metal body.

Despite the potential benefits, APS never really caught on with professional photographers because of the significantly smaller film area (58% of 135 film) and narrow selection of film types. In controlled testing, Popular Photography found that prints from one new emulsion developed for APS were significantly sharper than an equivalently-sized prints using a legacy 135 film emulsion, despite having to enlarge the APS frame by a greater magnification ratio. However, the new emulsion also could be (and later was) used for 35 mm film, eliminating the advantage of the smaller format. Film selection also hindered adoption of APS. Initially, only color print film was available, with a limited selection of film speeds. Color slide film, popular with professional photographers, proved unpopular in APS format and was soon discontinued, although chromogenic black-and-white IX240 film continued to be produced.

In January 2004, Kodak announced it was ceasing APS camera production.

Both Fuji and Kodak, the last two manufacturers of APS film, discontinued production in 2011.

== Design ==
The film is 24 mm wide, and has three selectable image formats:

APS image formats
Name	Meaning	Frame size	Aspect ratio	Print	Crop factor (vs. 36×24 full frame)	APS-H, APS-C, and APS-P film frame sizes, compared to the standard 35 mm frame
H	High Definition	30.2×16.7 mm (1.2×0.7 in)	16:9	4×7"	1.25	APS-H, APS-C, and APS-P film frame sizes, compared to the standard 35 mm frame
C	Classic	25.1×16.7 mm (1.0×0.7 in)	3:2	4×6"	1.44	APS-H, APS-C, and APS-P film frame sizes, compared to the standard 35 mm frame
P	Panoramic	30.2×9.5 mm (1.2×0.4 in)	3:1	4×11"	1.37	APS-H, APS-C, and APS-P film frame sizes, compared to the standard 35 mm frame

The "C" and "P" formats are formed by cropping the 30.2 × 16.7 mm "High Definition" image, which uses the same 16:9 aspect ratio as high-definition television. The "C" format has the same 3:2 aspect ratio as a 135 film image. Most APS cameras (with the exception of some disposable cameras) can record all three formats.

The entire "H" frame is recorded on the film for each exposure, and information is recorded on the film to instruct the photofinsher to print the format selected by the photographer; an image recorded in one aspect ratio can be reprinted in another. In addition to the frame format, the information exchange (IX) standard included with APS identifies the film cartridge with a unique six-digit serial number. Some cameras can use IX to record additional metadata, including exposure information, onto the film, either optically or magnetically.

The format selection is indicated on the film by a series of exposed squares alongside the image area (optical recording) or in a thin, transparent magnetic coating (magnetic recording), depending on the camera. In the absence of an operator-specified format, the machine printing an APS roll will use these indicators to determine the output format of each print.

=== Updated usage ===
Presently the format names APS-C and APS-H are most often used in reference to various makes of digital SLR that contain imaging sensors that have approximately the same crop factor as those formats, albeit with different actual dimensions, as APS-H digital sensors have a 3:2 aspect ratio, not the 16:9 aspect ratio of the APS-H film frame. Some of the lenses originally released with the APS SLRs have survived and are now marketed towards use on "APS" digital SLRs for the same reason. In reference to digital cameras, APS may also mean active pixel sensor, a type of CMOS image sensor.

=== Film and cartridge ===
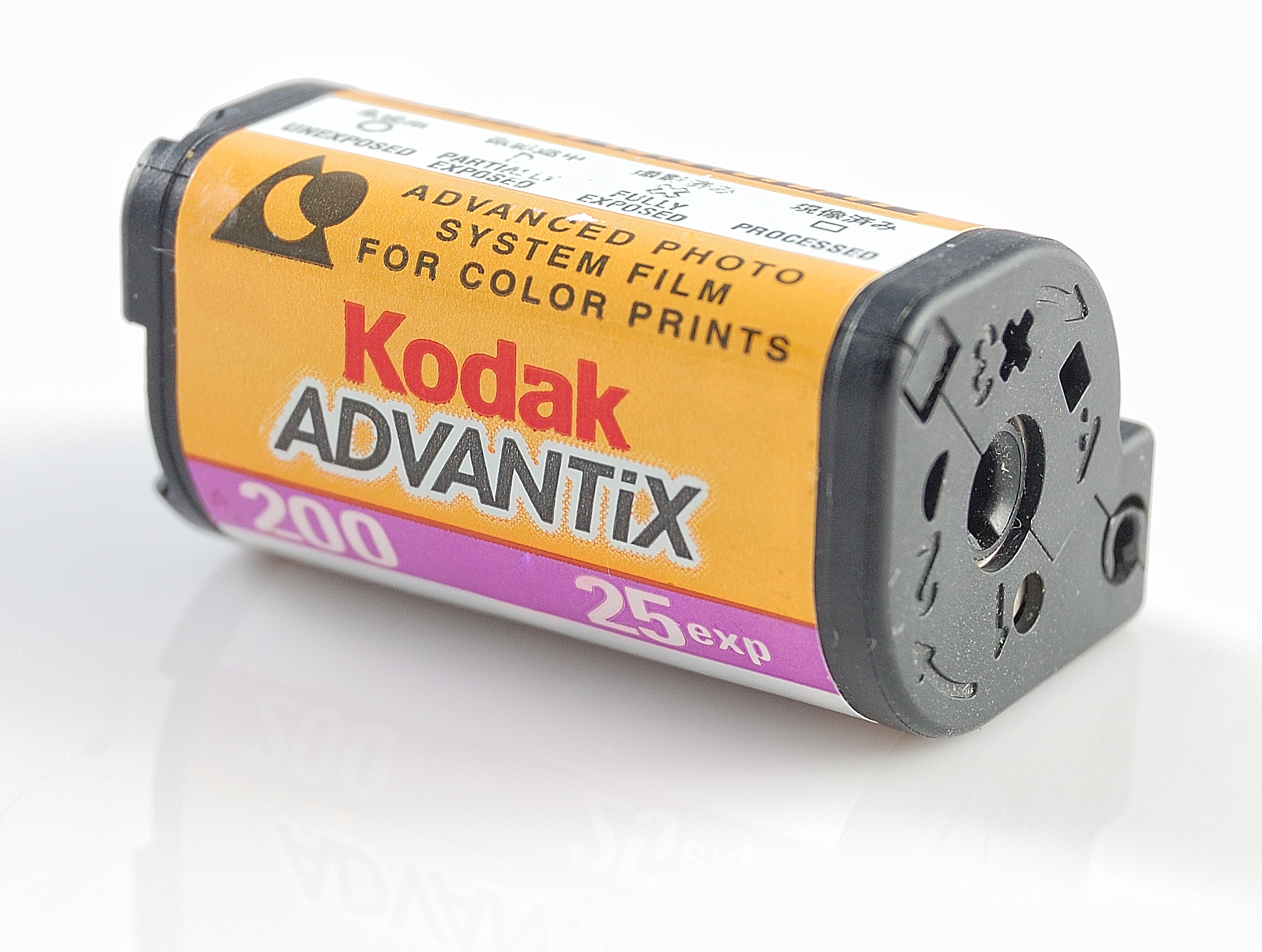
KODAK Advantix APS film cartridge

The film is on a polyethylene naphthalate (PEN) base, and is wound on a single spool, housed in a plastic cartridge 39 mm (1.5 in) long. The PEN base is both thinner and lies flatter than traditional film base. In cross section, the cartridge resembles a squircle with varying corner radii. The basic diameter across one diagonal is 21 mm, while the basic diameter across the opposite diagonal measures 30 mm, including the corner slot where the film exits. The slot is protected by a lightproof door. It is available in 40, 25 and 15 exposure lengths.

The film includes a transparent magnetic coating over the entire rear surface; information is recorded on narrow tracks near the edge of the film. Each frame has four tracks: two below the frame, reserved for the camera, and two above the frame, reserved for the photofinishing equipment. Some APS cameras use this coating to record exposure information via the IX system.

APS simplifies film handling by allowing the camera to wind the film automatically when loaded, and similarly by rewinding automatically after all the exposures have been taken; some cameras also can rewind partially exposed film cartridges, allowing them to be removed and used later. Numbered symbols (called 'visual indicators') on the cartridge end indicate the status of the film cartridge:

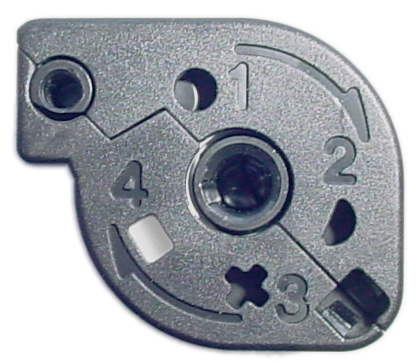
Visual indicators on an APS cartridge; this cartridge is in state 4 (fully exposed and developed)

1. Full circle: Unexposed
2. Half circle: Partly exposed
3. Cross sign: Fully exposed but not processed
4. Rectangle: Processed

Additionally, a tab on one end of the cartridge indicates that the cartridge has been processed. On the end opposite the visual indicators, a reflective bar code-like system is used to indicate precise film speed (at release, coded from ISO 25 to 1600), type (reversal or negative), and number of exposures; for simpler cameras, a mechanical notch indicates if the film speed is greater than or less than ISO 200.

Kodak initially released its APS color print films under the Advantix brand, in ISO 100, 200, and 400 speeds; in July 1996, Kodak introduced ADVANTIX 200 Professional. By 2000, Kodak had introduced a monochrome print film.

In 1998, Fujifilm offered color print and slide film under the established Fujichrome (ISO 100) and Fujicolor brands (ISO 100, 200, and 400) along with a new "SmartFilm" brand; by 2002, Fujifilm had dropped the reversal film and was branding its APS color print film as Fujicolor Nexia, extending the range to ISO 800.

=== Information exchange (IX) ===
A major distinction of APS film is the ability to record information other than the image. This metadata information is most commonly used for print aspect ratio, but can also be used to record the date and time that the photograph was taken, store a caption, and record exposure data such as shutter speed and aperture setting. This information can be read by the photo printing equipment to determine the print aspect ratio, print information on the back (or, rarely, the front) of the photograph, or to improve print quality. The system was invented by four engineers at Kodak, who were awarded patents in 1992 and 1993 and who jointly were named the National Inventor of the Year in 1996.

Two methods for storing information on the film are employed: "magnetic IX" and "optical IX". Optical IX is employed by less expensive cameras and disposable cameras, and employs a light source to expose a small section of the film, outside of the image negative area. This method is limited to determining the print aspect ratio of the finished print.

Magnetic IX is used in the more expensive cameras and allows for more information exchange. Most cameras with magnetic IX automatically record the exposure date and time on tracks in the magnetic layer, outside the visible area, with more advanced models allowing the user to specify a predetermined caption to be printed on the photo or record the exposure settings, as well as determine print aspect ratio. Kodak claimed that a 40-exposure roll could record more than 80 KB of data. Magnetic IX reportedly caused some problems for photo processors, who found their magnetic reading heads had to be cleaned frequently, or that their equipment's ability to print this information was limited, but Kodak's testing indicated magnetic deposits were not a concern.

=== Processing ===
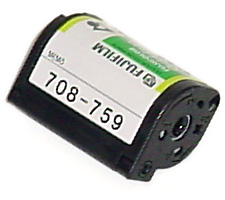
Fujifilm APS cartridge, assigned FID code 708-759

After the film developing process, APS film is stored in the original cartridge, unlike 135 film. For identification, every cartridge is assigned a unique nine-digit cartridge identification (CID) code and the associated strip of APS film is assigned an identical filmstrip identification (FID) code; while the CID code has nine digits, the FID code has six human-readable digits and nine machine-readable digits. The six-digit FID code is printed on the cartridge label, at both ends of the processed negative, and also is stored magnetically (as a nine-digit code) in the IX layer. This FID is usually printed on the index print as well as the back of every individual print. The CID/FID system was designed to be an additional convenience both for the photoprocessor, who can easily match each processed film strip and prints with its cartridge, and each cartridge to a particular customer's order, and for the consumer, who can easily locate the correct cartridge if reprints are desired.

To facilitate automatic processing of film, a unique DX number is assigned to the different types of film.

APS film is typically processed by using a small machine to transfer the exposed APS film from the original cartridge to a reloadable one, then re-attached to the original cartridge and rewound using another machine after processing. After support for APS was withdrawn in 2011, many film processors dispose of the APS cartridge and return the exposed film strip bare.

An IX240 negative strip; note printed FID (708–759) preceding first frame

== Cameras ==
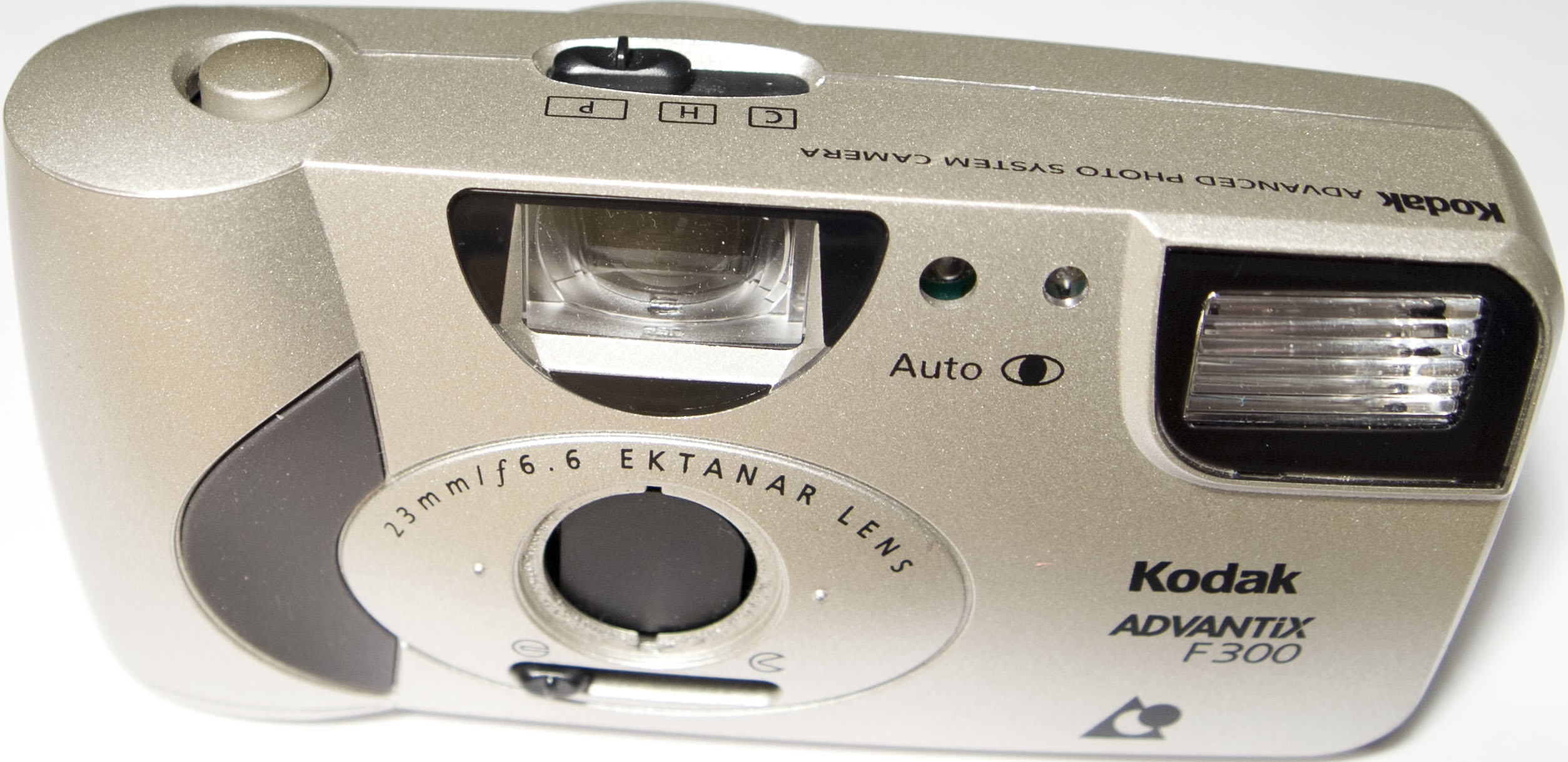
Kodak Advantix F300, a typical entry-level, fixed-focus APS compact camera

The format was introduced in 1996 by Kodak, Fujifilm, Minolta, Nikon, Canon and others. APS was mainly used for point and shoot amateur cameras, Several of the cameras at launch shared a common design, including the Fujifilm Endeavor 100 / Minolta Vectis UC / Nikon Nuvis Mini and Kodak Advantix 5600MRX / Minolta Vectis 40. The Canon ELPH drew attention for its stainless steel body and compact dimensions.

Camera manufacturers and their branded lines of APS point-and-shoot cameras included:

- Argus Inc. (APSxxx)
- Canon (ELPH (Americas) / IXUS (Europe) / IXY (Japan))
- Contax (T ix)
- Fujifilm (Endeavor, Nexia)
- Kodak (Advantix)
- Konica (BiG mini S, Revio)
- Minolta (Vectis)
- Nikon (Nuvis)
- Olympus (Centurion, iSnap, iZoom, Newpic)
- Pentax (efina)
- Samsung (Impax, Rocas)
- Vivitar
- Yashica (Acclaim)

Three SLR systems with interchangeable lenses also were released.

=== APS SLR cameras ===
APS SLRs

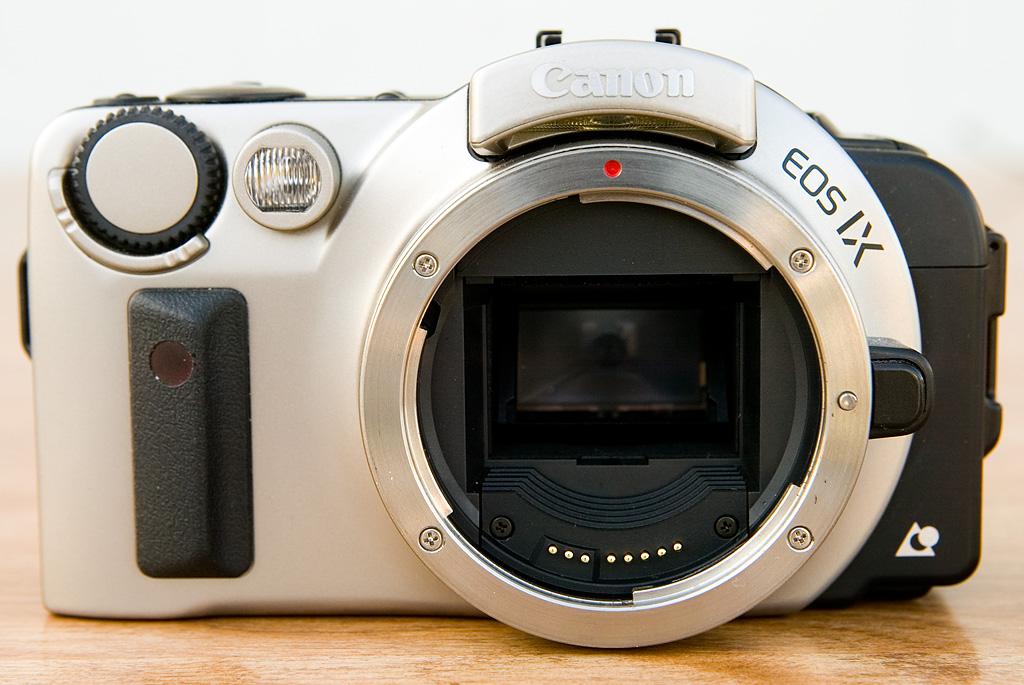
Canon EOS IX

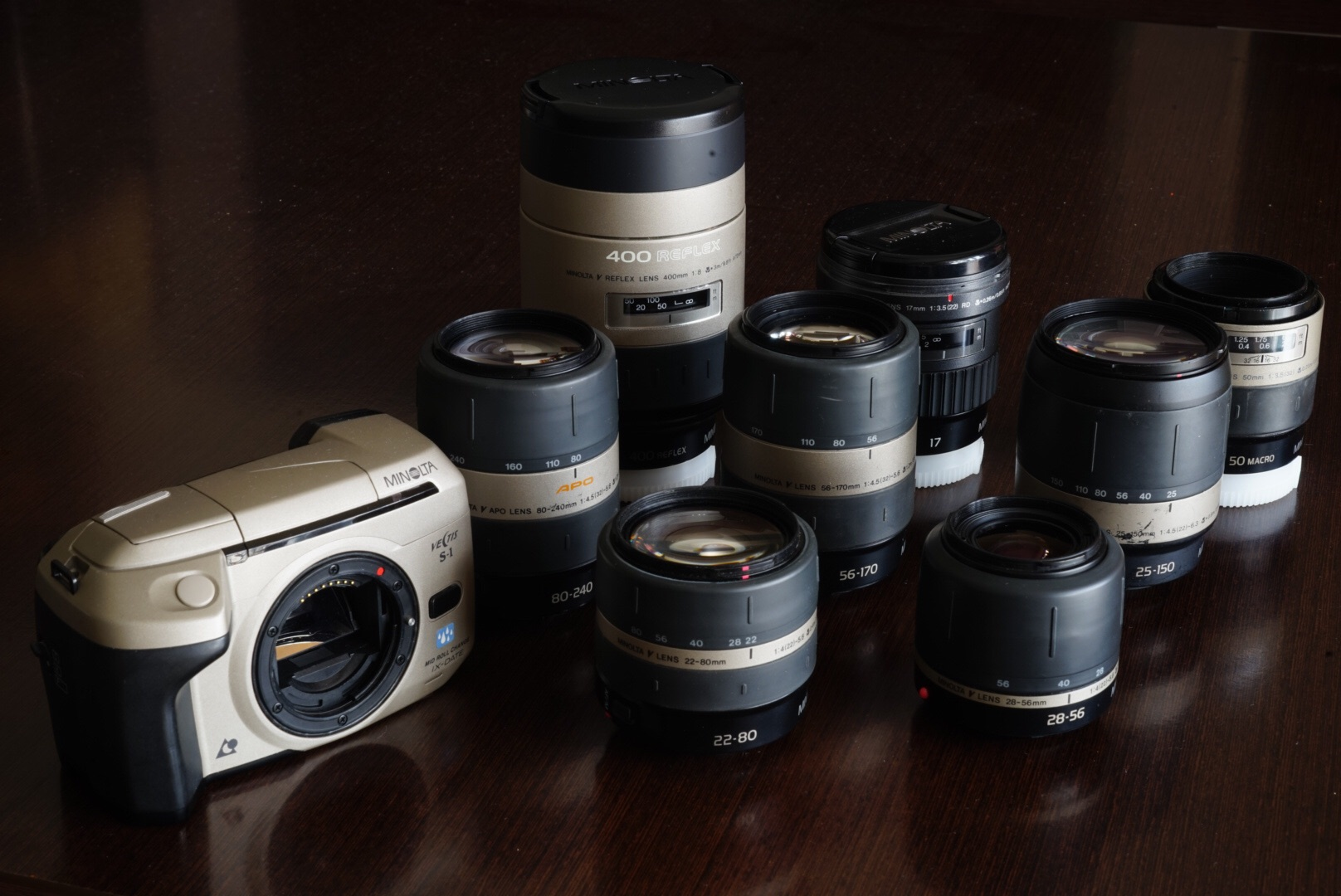
Minolta Vectis S-1 with complete lens lineup

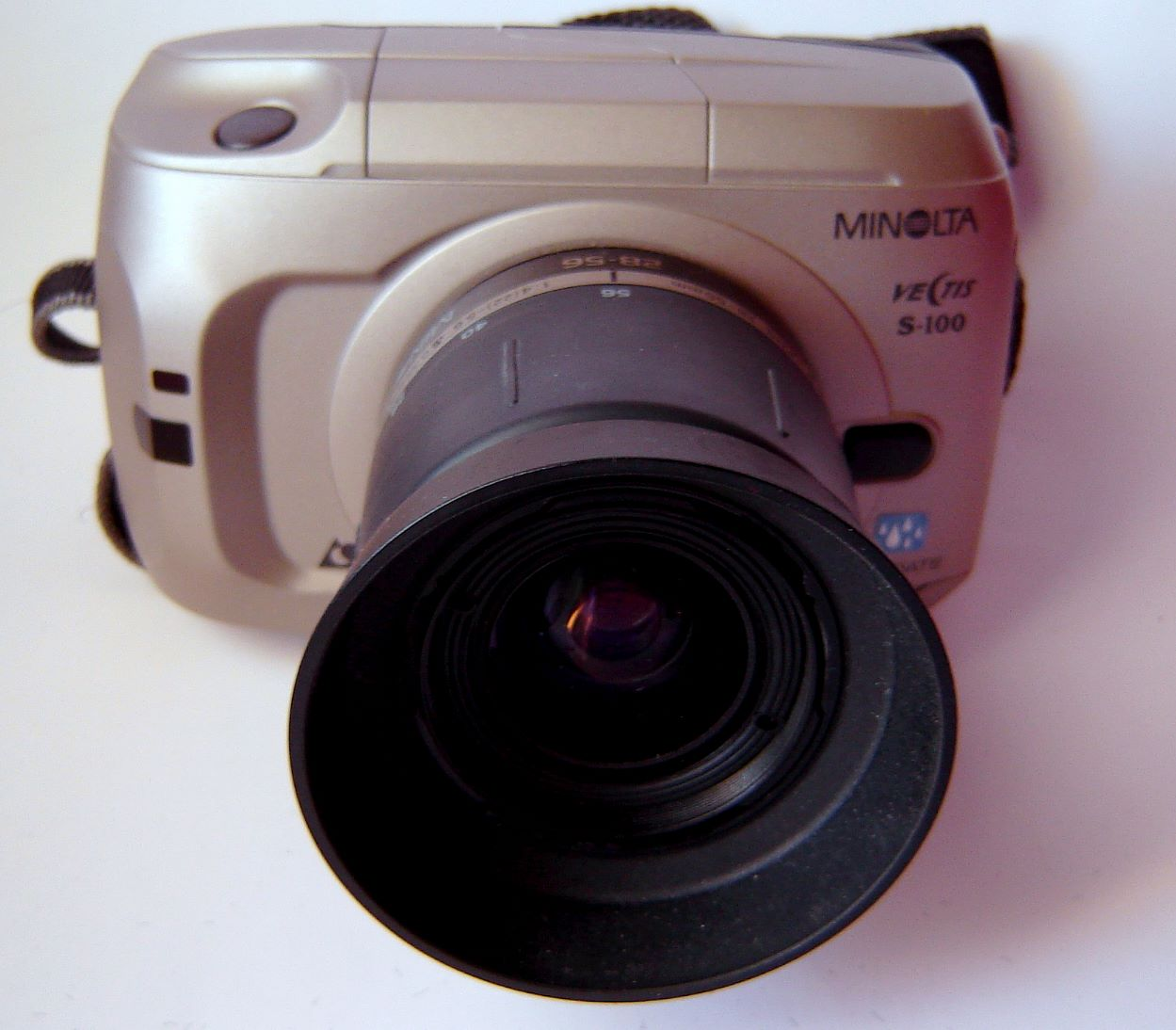
Minolta Vectis S-100 with 28~56 mm kit lens

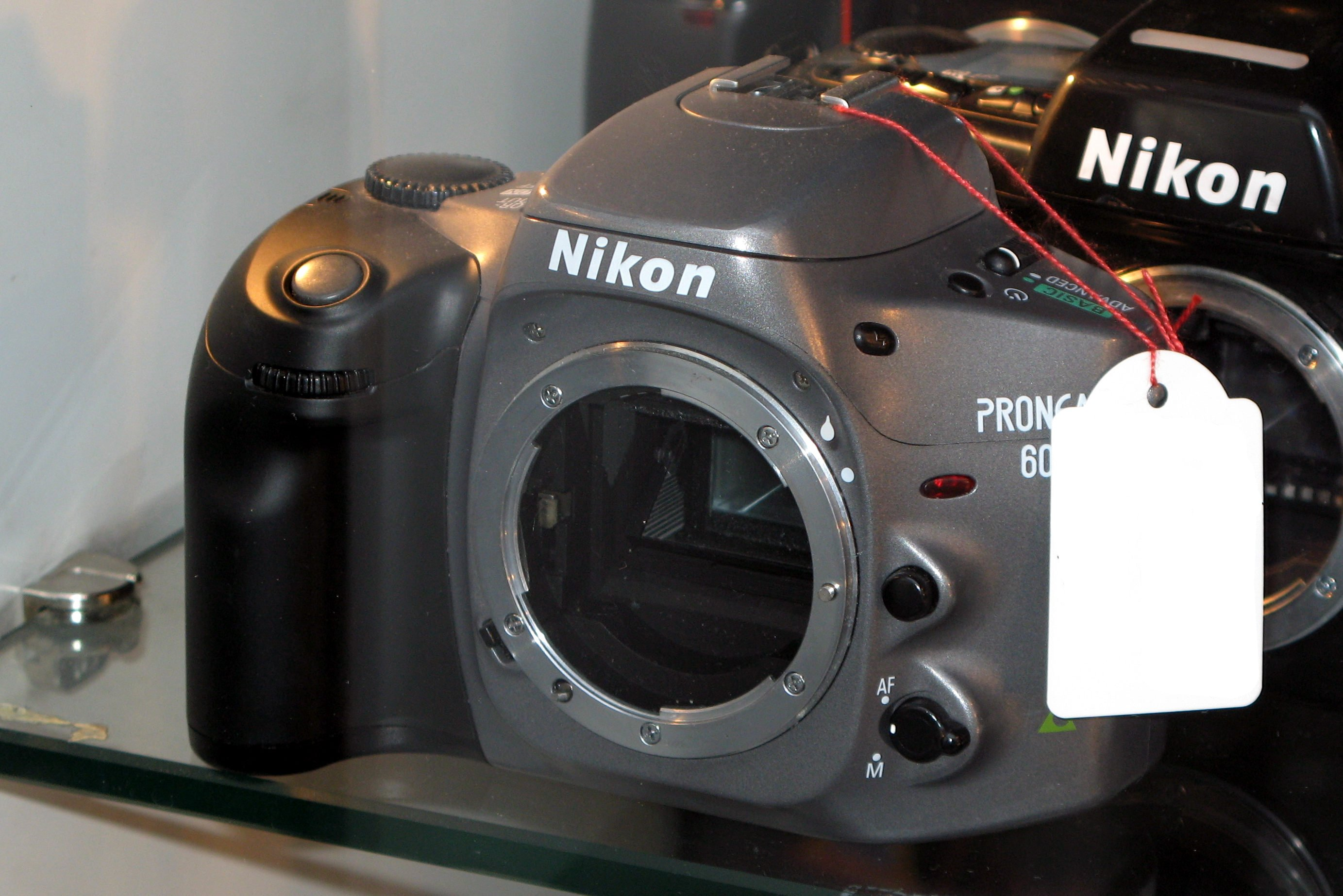
Nikon Pronea 600i

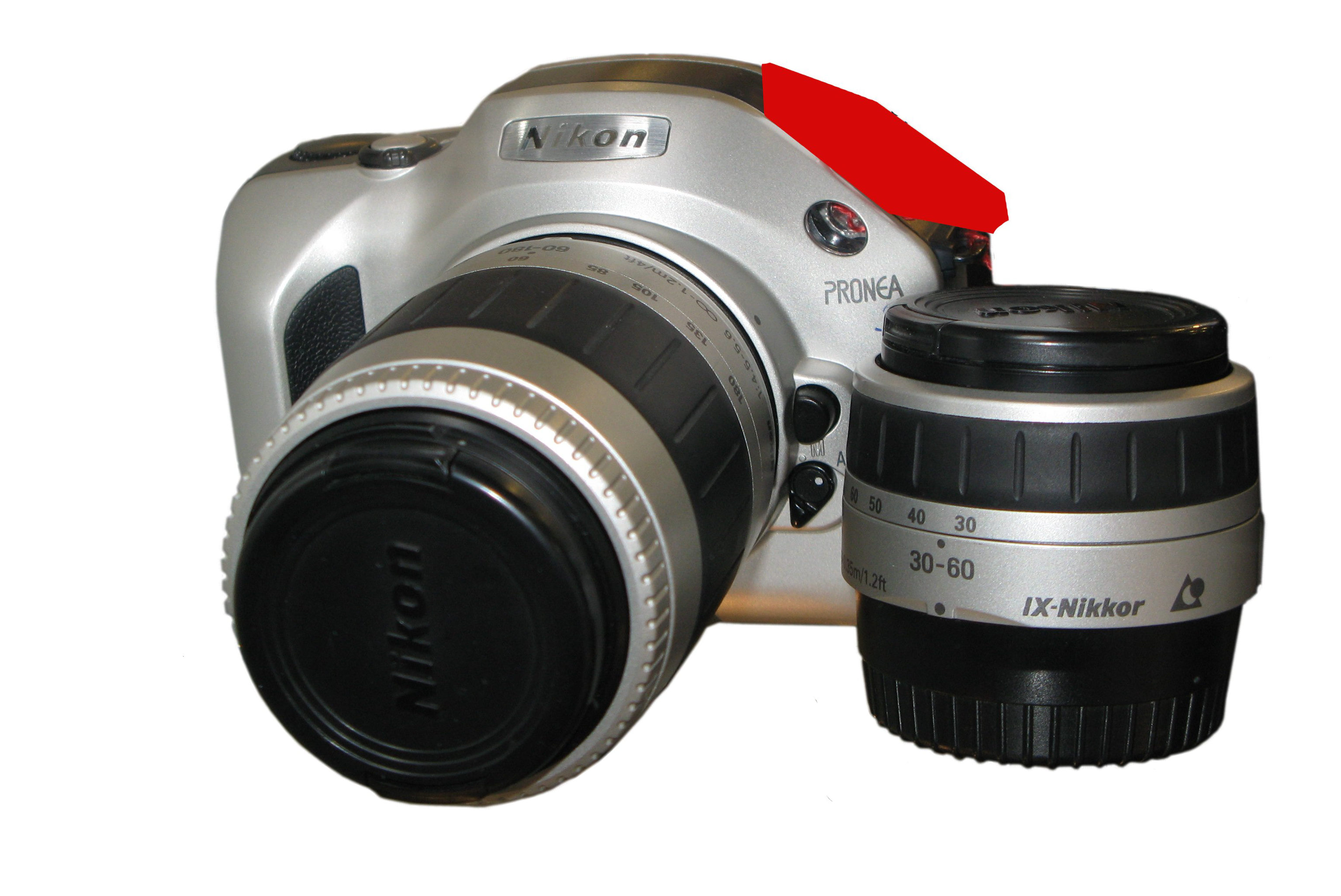
Nikon Pronea S with IX-Nikkor lenses

Three APS SLR systems were released as:

- Canon EOS IX (EOS IX and IX Lite)
- Minolta Vectis (S-1 and S-100)
- Nikon Pronea cameras (6i/600i and S) with IX-Nikkor lenses

In addition to these interchangeable-lens models, Olympus released the Centurion, a Zoom-lens reflex camera (ZLR), similar to an SLR, but fitted with a fixed zoom lens (25~100 mm f/4.5~5.6). Fujifilm also sold a rebranded version of the Centurion as the Endeavor 4000SL. Before the system was released, Herbert Keppler expressed doubt about the potential market for APS SLRs, as both professional and amateur photographers would be constrained by the format's limitations, but thought the reduced size could appeal for niche uses such as photographers who want a more flexible lightweight travel option than a point-and-shoot. APS SLR cameras were not particularly successful; they were too expensive for the high-end amateur market when they first appeared, and professional photographers continued to use 35 mm cameras, which offered a wider choice of films, greater image quality and resolution.

APS SLR systems and cameras
Mfr.	System	Camera	Rel.	Lens mount	Shutter	Dimensions	Weight
Canon	EOS IX	EOS IX	Oct 1996	EF	30–1/4000 s, B; synch: 1/200 s	132×80×59 mm (5.2×3.1×2.3 in)	485 g (17.1 oz) w/ 2×CR123A
Canon	EOS IX	EOS IX Lite	Mar 1998	EF	30–1/2000 s; synch: 1/125 s	123×80×64 mm (4.8×3.1×2.5 in)	360 g (13 oz) w/out 2×CR2
Minolta	Vectis S	S-1	1996	V	30–1/2000 s, B; synch: 1/125 s	127×76×64 mm (5×3×2.5 in)	370 g (12.9 oz) w/out 2×CR2
Minolta	Vectis S	S-100	?	V	30–1/1000 s; synch: 1/90 s	124×76×55 mm (4.9×3×2.18 in)	310 g (11.1 oz) w/out 2×CR2
Nikon	Pronea	6i	1996	F	30–1/4000 s, B; synch: 1/180 s	135×99×74 mm (5.3×3.9×2.9 in)	560 g (19.8 oz) w/out 2×CR123A
Nikon	Pronea	S	1999	F	30–1/2000 s, B; synch: 1/125 s	116×87×57 mm (4.6×3.4×2.2 in)	450 g (16 oz) w/out 2×CR2

Of these the Canon EOS IX and the Nikon Pronea SLRs could use existing 35 mm SLR lenses with Canon EF and Nikon F mount, respectively, whereas Minolta opted to create a new lens mount which later was shared with the Minolta Dimâge RD 3000, an early digital SLR (DSLR). Using existing lenses meant the field of view was reduced by around 1.6×, but had the advantage of a larger lens selection. Creating a new lens system on the other hand gave the possibility of creating smaller and lighter lenses as they had a smaller image circle to cover.

Concurrently with their APS SLR film cameras, Canon, Minolta, and Nikon released lenses specifically intended for use on APS film cameras; the APS-specific lenses have shorter focal lengths to compensate for the reduced image size. Canon's lenses, which included the EF 24-85mm, EF 22-55mm, and EF 55-200mm lenses, were fully functional with 35 mm EOS SLRs; at least one (24–85mm) was available in silver finish to match the EOS IX camera.

Minolta released eight lenses for the Vectis V mount, with five zooms covering a range from 22 to 240 mm and three prime lenses at 17, 50 (macro), and 400 (catadioptric) mm focal lengths. An adapter was available to use 35 mm A-mount (Alpha / Dynax / Maxxum) lenses, with limited functionality.

To accompany the Pronea SLRs, Nikon released six IX-Nikkor zoom lenses, all designed by Haruo Sato, which were lighter and had a smaller image circle, similar in concept to the later Nikon DX format lenses released with the company's DSLRs, starting in 2004. The Nikon IX series of lenses were not compatible with the existing line of Nikon 35 mm SLRs; as they were designed with a smaller image circle and had a shorter back-focus, the rear elements, protruding into the body, would foul the mirror. However, the Nikon Pronea cameras accepted F-mount lenses for Nikon 35 mm SLRs.

== See also ==
- Film format
- List of color film systems
- List of photographic film formats
- Panoramic photography
