= Social fund =

A social fund (sometimes also called Social Investment Fund, Social Fund for Development, Social Action Fund, National Solidarity Fund or Social Development Agency) is an institution, typically in a developing country, that provides financing (usually grants) for small-scale public investments targeted at meeting the needs of poor and vulnerable communities. Social Funds also aim at contributing to social capital and development at the local level. In many cases they serve as innovators and demonstrators of new methods of decentralized participatory decision-making, management, and accountability that may be adopted for broader application by public sector organizations.

== Prevalence ==
In 2007 Social Funds existed in more than 45 countries, predominantly in poorer and smaller developing countries that receive significant official development assistance. However, a Social Fund also exists in Romania, a country that has recently joined the EU, as well as in many other Eastern European countries. Probably the largest Social Fund is the Pakistan Poverty Alleviation Fund (PPAF) with a resource base of US$ 500 million. Social Funds have channeled close to US$ 5 billion of World Bank funding in Africa alone between 1999 and 2005 and have channeled more than ten billion dollars from all donors and governments' own resources over the past 20 years.

== History ==
The first Social Fund was created in 1987 in Bolivia. During the 1990s Social Funds spread quickly throughout Latin America and Africa with the intellectual and financial backing of the World Bank and other donors.

The first generation social funds were created to serve as short-term safety nets to soften the impact of structural adjustment policies on the poor, which was mainly achieved by providing temporary employment. Second generation social funds have adopted more explicit institutional strategies aimed at empowerment and capacity building of communities as well as local governments in the context of decentralization.

Social Funds were created as temporary agencies that would be phased out once capacity of line agencies had been strengthened. Some Social Funds, such as in Ethiopia, are now in the process of being phased out, and others, such as in Honduras, are supposed to be closed down by law a few years from now. However, many Social Funds may well remain permanent institutions fulfilling important functions that line agencies may not be well set up to perform.

== Analysis ==
In 2002 the World Bank carried out the first systematic, cross-country evaluation of social funds. The evaluation covered social funds in Armenia, Bolivia, Honduras, Nicaragua, Peru, and Zambia in the fields of education, health, water, and sanitation projects. Outcomes such as poverty targeting, improvement of living standards, sustainability, and cost efficiency were evaluated. The evaluation concluded that social funds are effective at reaching the poor and investments made by social funds enable greater communities' participation and access to basic facilities and services.

== Benefits ==
Some of the benefits of Social Funds have been their ability to better reach poor constituencies, to reduce corruption and to introduce innovations. Social Funds have pioneered community-driven development (CDD), whereby community-based organizations (typically representing a few hundred people or less, often in rural areas) administrate funds themselves and choose where to invest them, thus increasing transparency and accountability for the use of funds. This approach also builds the self-confidence and capacity of local communities. It also helps projects to better meet local needs.

== Criticism ==
Social Funds have been criticized for displacing or weakening existing institutions such as sectoral ministries and departments, particularly since they often - but not always - offer salaries that are significantly higher than in the public sector. Another criticism is that there has been no exit strategy to phase out Social Funds, although they were intended to be temporary institutions.

== Examples ==
=== Africa south of the Sahara ===
There are close to twenty social funds in Africa, including in

- Angola (FAS),
- Burundi - Fonds social de développement (FSD),
- Benin - Fonds social de développement (FSD),
- Eritrea,
- Ethiopia - Ethiopian Social Rehabilitation Fund (ESRF),
- Lesotho,
- Madagascar - Fonds d’Intervention pour le Développement (FID),
- Mali - Fonds de solidarité nationale (FSN),
- Malawi - Malawi Social Action Fund (MASAF),
- Senegal - Fonds Social de Développement (FSD),
- Sierra Leone- National Commission for Social Action (NaCSA),
- Tanzania - Tanzania Social Action Fund. (TASAF),
- Zambia - Zambia Social Investment Fund (Zamsif), and
- Zimbabwe - Social Development Fund (SDF).

=== Asia ===
- Armenia - Armenian Social Investment Fund,
- Cambodia,
- Kyrgyzstan,
- Laos,
- Pakistan - Pakistan Poverty Alleviation Fund (PPAF),
- Philippines, and
- Tajikistan - Tajikistan Social Investment Fund (TASIF)

=== Europe ===
- Albania
- Bosnia
- Macedonia
- Moldova
- Romania - Romanian Social Development Fund,
- Ukraine

=== Latin America and the Caribbean ===
- Belize (Social Investment Fund)
- Bolivia (FPS)
- Ecuador (FISE)
- El Salvador (FISDL)
- Guatemala (FIS)
- Haiti (FAES)
- Honduras (FHIS)
- Jamaica (JSIF)
- Nicaragua (FISE)
- Panama (FIS)
- Peru (FONCODES)

=== Middle East and North Africa ===
- Lebanon - The Economic and Social Fund for Development (ESFD) www.esfd.cdr.gov.lb
- Algeria Social Development Agency
- Egypt - Social Fund for Development (SFD),
- Morocco Social Development Agency,
- Tunisia - Fonds de solidarité nationale (FSN),
- Yemen Social Fund for Development (SFD)

== See also ==
- AGETIP

== Sources ==
- Frigenti, L., Harth and Huque, 1998. Local Solutions to Regional Problems: The Growth of Social Funds and Public Works and Employment Projects in Sub-Saharan Africa, Water and Urban 2 and Institutional and Social Policy Divisions, Africa Region, World Bank, Washington, D.C.
- World Bank: Social Funds—Power to the People

== Disambiguation ==
Social funds in developing countries should not be confused with the European Social Fund or the UK's Social Fund.
