= Budgeting loan =

United Kingdom social security loans

Budgeting loans are a feature of the social security system in the United Kingdom. Budgeting Loans are interest free loans from the Social Fund that are available only to people claiming certain income-related benefits. Since 2013, the scheme is known as Budgeting Advances.

== Introduction ==
Budgeting Loans were introduced in April1988 as part of three financial components in the Discretionary Social Fund which included Budgeting Loans, Crisis Loans and Community Care Grants. The scheme was revamped in April 1999 and aimed to make the process simpler; this led to a rise in successful applications; with almost 1.7million applications in the years 1999–2000.

== Budgeting Advances ==
In 2012 the government overhauled the benefit system in the UK and therefore in 2013 Universal Credit was introduced and Budgeting Loans were largely replaced with Budgeting Advances. Although the discretionary element of the Social Fund was abolished those who have not yet been transferred over to Universal Credit can still apply. However, those in receipt of Universal Credit are ineligible for a budgeting loan and must instead apply for a Budgeting Advance instead.

The loan is meant to be used for household necessities and paying down existing consumer debt. The total sum can be up to £812, if the applicant is part of a couple with children. In 2019, the UK government has re-affirmed its commitment to the loan scheme.

== Reception ==
The Discretionary Social Fund method of loans has been criticised as the repayments are deducted from future benefit payments. However, it was noted for helping people in the short term, for immediate expenses, which they would not ordinarily be able to get a loan for (potentially avoiding use of high interest lenders & loan sharks). When first introduced, the loans were operated by the local offices which unfairly affected poorer areas, due to limited budgets per office. This was later challenged in the High Court and led to the introduction of national call centres to manage the claims.
