= Elf (video game) =

1991 video game

- Developer: Ocean Software
- Publisher: Ocean Software
- Platforms: Amiga, Atari ST, MS-DOS
- Release: 1991: Amiga, ST; 1992: MS-DOS
- Genre: Action

Elf is an action video game published for the Amiga and Atari ST in 1991 by Ocean Software. A version for MS-DOS was released in 1992.

== Gameplay ==
Elf is a game in which Cornelius goes on a quest to rescue Elisa.

== Reception ==
Reception

Review scores
| Publication | Score |
|---|---|
| ACE | 810 |
| Amiga Action | 87% |
| Amiga Format | 85% |
| ST Format | 89% |

Leah Wesolowski reviewed the game for Computer Gaming World, and stated that "While the musical score is nice, it does not make up for Elf's lack of finesse. Perhaps a trip to the guillotine is fitting for this Elf."

Tom Malcom for Info remarked on the detail and fast pace of the game, and concluded that "If you appreciate fine graphics and frantic gameplay, you'll love Elf."

Ciaran Brennan for The One for Amiga Games praised the game, calling it "A beautiful puzzle game with astonishing hidden depths".

Ed Ricketts for ST Format enjoyed the graphics and gameplay, and felt that the game kept him occupied.

Damian Slee for Amiga Action liked the graphics and sound, and felt that "If you're after a good action game that requires a little bit of thinking power as well, this is definitely the one for you."

Adrian Price for Amiga Format noted the difficulty and concluded that "It's not too hard for those who fancy the occasional arcade blast, but really challenge the die hard platform freaks."

Fiona Keating for CU Amiga found it "an extremely enjoyable game" thanks to its riddles and conundrums.

Gary Whitta for ACE commented that while not everyone will enjoy it, "it's a quality romp, and one that will keep variety-starved platform fans busy into the small hours".
