= Elf Cafe (restaurant) =

- Interactive map of Elf Cafe

Restaurant information
- Established: 2006
- Owner: Scott Zwiezen
- Food type: Mediterranean cuisine
- Location: 2135 West Sunset Boulevard, Echo Park, Los Angeles, California, 90026, United States
- Coordinates: 34.077613°N 118.264639°W
- Website: elfcafe.com

Elf Cafe is a Mediterranean restaurant owned by Scott Zwiezen and located in Echo Park, California. It opened in 2006, closed during the COVID-19 pandemic, and was the subject of a 2022 episode of the NPR podcast In the Weeds. It reopened with a new menu and look in 2023.
