= Canon ELPH (series) =

Series of APS film cameras

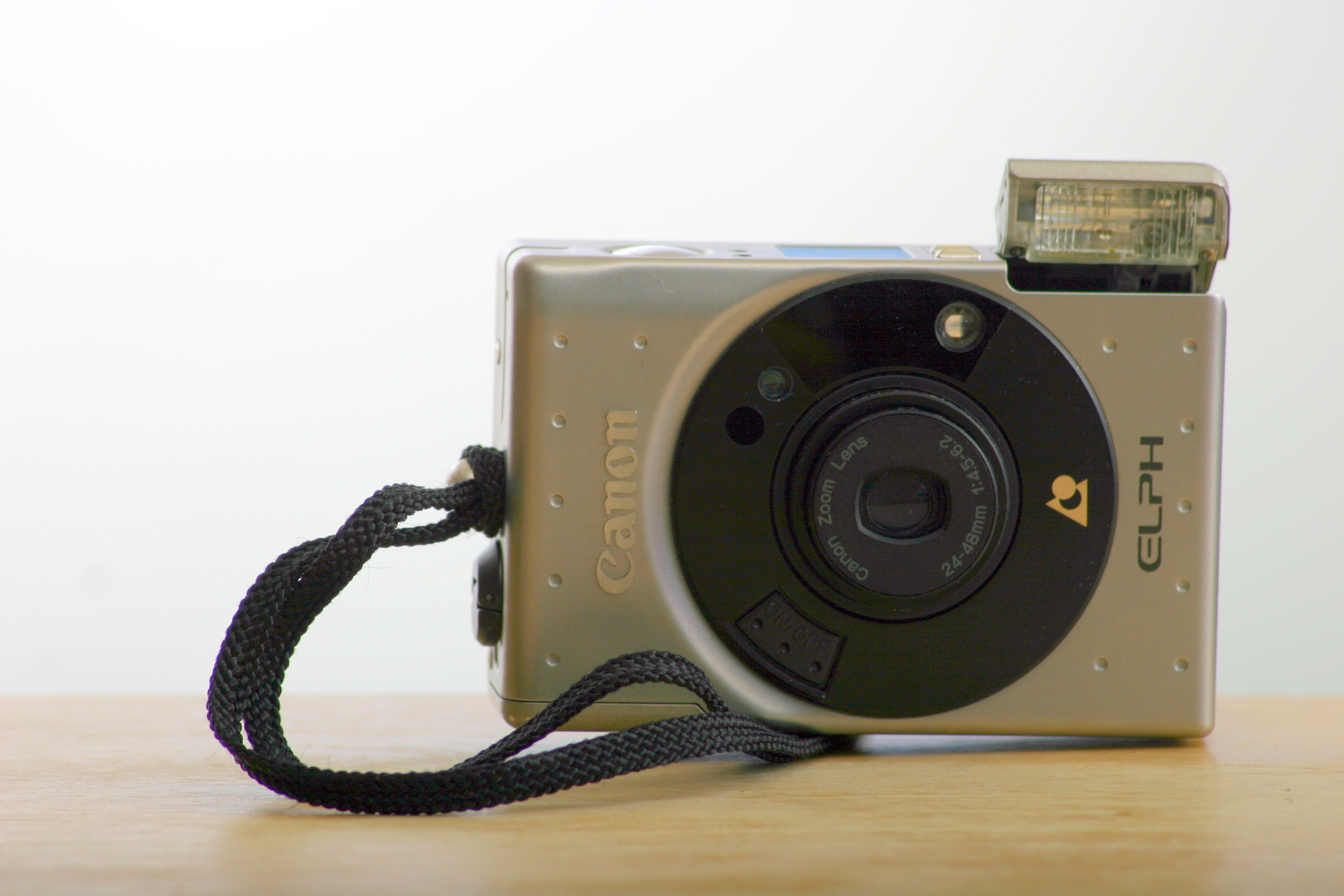
Canon ELPH APS Camera

The Canon ELPH (also known as IXUS in Europe and IXY in Japan) series includes several popular compact point and shoot film cameras released by Canon Inc. between 1996 and 2002. All ELPH cameras used the Advanced Photo System (APS) film format, with cartridge film that was 25% smaller than a 35-mm cartridge. The companion line of digital cameras, the Digital ELPH series, remains in production.

== Models ==
Model (US)	Model (Europe)	Model (Japan)	Release date
ELPH	IXUS	IXY	May 1996
ELPH 490Z	IXUS Z90	IXY G	June 1996
ELPH 10 AF	IXUS AF-S	IXY 20	October 1996
ELPH 10	IXUS FF25	IXY 10	November 1996
ELPH 260Z	Z60 IX	IXY 25	July 1997
ELPH Jr.	IXUS L-1	IXY 310	September 1997
ELPH Limited	IXUS Limited	IXY Limited	September 1997
ELPH 370Z	IXUS Z70	IXY 330	March 1998
ELPH LT	IXUS M-1	IXY 210	September 1998
n/a	IXUS FF	n/a	March 1999
ELPH 2	IXUS II	IXY 320	March 1999
ELPH Sport	IXUS X-1	IXY D5	November 1999
ELPH LT260	IXUS Z50	IXY 220	March 2000
ELPH LT270	IXUS Z65	IXY 230	February 2001
ELPH Shades Glacier	IXUS Concept Summer	n/a	March 2002
ELPH Shades Sunshine	IXUS Concept Arancia	n/a	March 2002
ELPH Z3	IXUS III	IXY i	March 2002

== See also ==
- Canon Digital IXUS
- Canon PowerShot
- List of Canon products
