= AGETIP =

Senegalese public works and public employment service

Executing Agency for Public Interest Works Against Underemployment (French: Agence d’Exécution des Travaux d’Intérêt Public contre le sous-emploi, AGETIP) is the public works and public employment service in Senegal. It provides mostly small-scale basic infrastructure (roads, water supply, sanitation, health centers, hospitals, schools etc.) and other services such as micro-enterprise credit, nutrition and female literacy programs for the benefit of the poor, while creating employment and promoting the local private sector. The term is also used to describe similar agencies created based on the model of the first AGETIP in Senegal.

== History ==
AGETIP in Senegal was created in 1989 during an economic crisis by the Senegalese government with the support of donors, in particular the World Bank. It is not a public entity, but a private non-profit entity (Association à but non lucratif) that is financed entirely by fees for the services it provides, without receiving government or donor funds to cover its administrative expenses. Its general-director is appointed by a Board that includes both government and non-government representatives. AGETIP Senegal does not carry out works itself, but contracts them out (delegated contract management). According to the World Bank, "AGETIP has acquired a virtual monopoly in construction management" in Senegal. AGETIP typically works closely with municipalities, which submit proposals and must provide counterpart funds. The agency initially worked only in urban areas, subsequently broadening its activities to rural areas. The AGETIP's quality control procedures have been certified by the Bureau Veritas Certification. The donors that carry out or have carried out development projects through the AGETIP Senegal are the World Bank, the African Development Bank, the European Union, the French Development Agency, the ILO, UNICEF, KfW of Germany and the Canadian International Development Agency, among others.

An evaluation by the World Bank's evaluation department carried out in 1996 praised AGETIP as a "development success and a model of efficient and effective public works management" with "transparent, streamlined procedures", crediting it for "significantly improving the management of donor finances". Accounts are paid in an average of three days and about 90 percent of contracts awarded by AGETIP are completed within the specified time. However, the evaluation also states that "grassroots participation by local communities will have to increase if benefits are to last over the long term" and that surveyed beneficiaries said they felt left out of the identification and planning process.

== Related agencies ==
By 2008 the AGETIP model has been replicated in 17 other African countries using different names:

- NIGETIP-Niger
- GAMWORKS-Gambia
- FASO BAARA-Burkina Faso
- ASSETIP-Rwanda
- AMEXTIPE-Mauritania
- AGETUR/AGETIP -Benin
- AGETUR-Togo
- AGETIPE CAF- Central African Republic
- AGETIPE-Guinea
- AGETIPE-Mali
- AGETIPA-Madagascar
- AGETIER-Mali
- AGEOPPE-Guinea Bissau
- AGECABO-Cap Verde
- ADU-Mauritania
- ADETIP-Djibouti
- ABUTIP-Burundi

The AGETIP model is similar to a Social fund, a term more commonly used for a similar type of institution in developing countries in Latin America and African countries outside West Africa.
