= Local welfare assistance scheme =

Local welfare assistance schemes are a feature of the British welfare system following the abolition of the discretionary element of the Social Fund. LWAS replaced crisis loans and community care grants which were to elements of the Social Fund. An example of a local welfare assistance scheme is the Essential Living Fund in Essex.
