= Community care grant =

Background

Community care grants were a feature of the Social Fund in the United Kingdom. They were abolished by the 2010-2015 Coalition Government when the Welfare Reform Act 2012 was passed.
