= Canon EOS IX =

1996 APS-format single-lens reflex camera

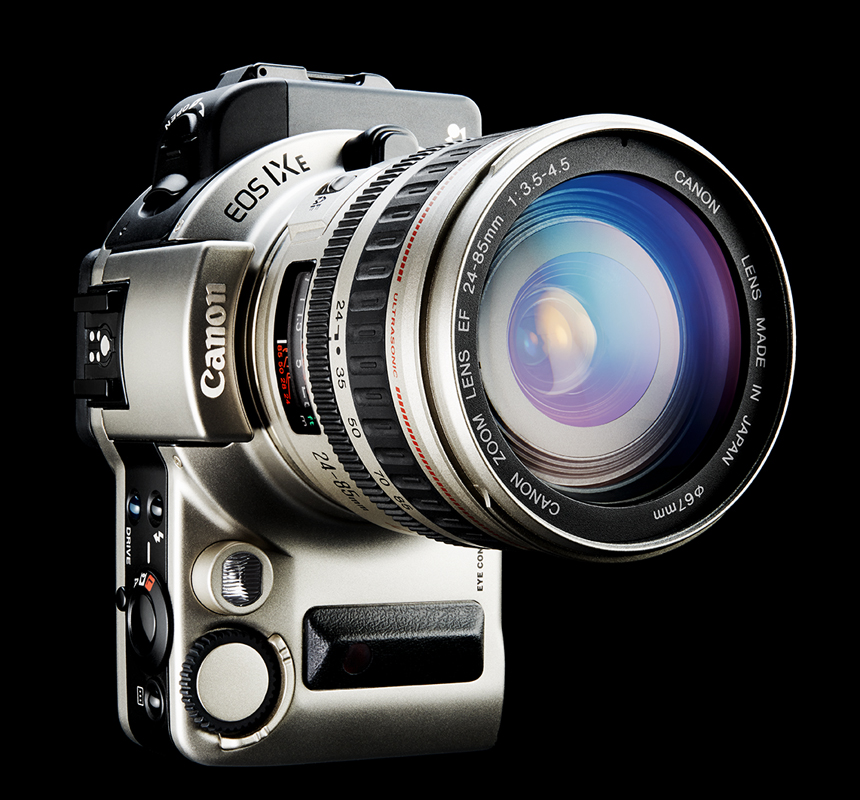

Overview
- Maker: Canon Inc.
- Type: APS SLR
- Released: October 1996
- Intro price: JPY 92,000 (body only)

Lens
- Lens mount: Canon EF lens mount

Sensor/medium
- Film format: APS
- Film speed: ISO 25 - 8000

Focusing
- Focus: TTL Phase Detection Autofocus (3 zone)

Exposure/metering
- Exposure: PASM autoexposure 6 zone evaluative metering

Flash
- Flash: Built-in flash Guide number 11

Shutter
- Frame rate: Up to 2.5 frame/s
- Shutter speeds: 30s - 1/4000s

General
- Battery: 2x CR123A
- Dimensions: 132×80×59 mm (5.2×3.1×2.3 in)
- Weight: 485 g (17 oz)

The EOS IX (world markets) or EOS IX E (Japanese market) is an APS-format single-lens reflex camera that was introduced by Canon Inc. of Japan in October 1996 as part of their EOS series SLR cameras. The other APS camera in this series is the Canon EOS IX Lite, also known as the EOS IX 7. Production ended in 2001.

== Autofocus and viewfinder ==
The EOS IX features Canon's Multi-BASIS TTL phase detection autofocus system with three focusing points. The Japanese EOS IX E model added Canon's Eye Control focus point selection system; in both, the three focus points can also be selected between manually, or automatically by the camera. The selected focus point lights in the viewfinder. Other superimposed viewfinder features include masks for the three APS formats (C, H and P), while an LCD outside the image area displays other shooting information. The viewfinder incorporates a roof pentamirror of 0.6× magnification (with a 40 mm lens focussed on infinity) and 95% coverage.

== Shutter, metering and exposure ==
The shutter, a vertically traveling, electronically controlled metal blade unit, can be set for speeds between 30 and 1/4000 seconds, with an X-sync speed of 1/200 second. A "Bulb" mode is also available, for exposure as long as the shutter button is depressed. The speed is continuously variable in Program and aperture-priority modes, and can be set in half-stop increments in shutter-priority and manual modes.

Metering is via a silicon photocell (SPC) giving 6-zone evaluative metering, center-weighted metering, and 6.5% partial metering. The metering range, at ISO 100 with a f/1.4 lens, is EV 1–20. Exposure compensation of ±2 EV can be applied in half-stop increments; the same range and increments apply to 3-shot auto-bracketing. The film speed range supported is ISO 25 to 8000, using DX coding if available.

== Flash ==
The EOS IX supports Canon's new E-TTL flash metering system when using modern Speedlite EX flashes, as well as the older A-TTL system, which is used with the on-board popup flash and older external flashes (Speedlite EZ).

Class	1987	1988	1989	1990	1991	1992	1993	1994	1995	1996	1997	1998	1999	2000	2001	2002	2003	2004	2005	2006	2007	…	2018
Professional				1					1N					1V									
Professional				RT					1N RS														
High-end				10			5						3										
Advanced		620		600		100				50					30				30V				
Midrange	650				1000F	1000F N		500			500N			300			300V		300X				
Entry-level		750	850	700					5000				3000			3000N		3000V					
Entry-level											IX												
Entry-level												IX 7											
