= Denmark–Zambia relations =

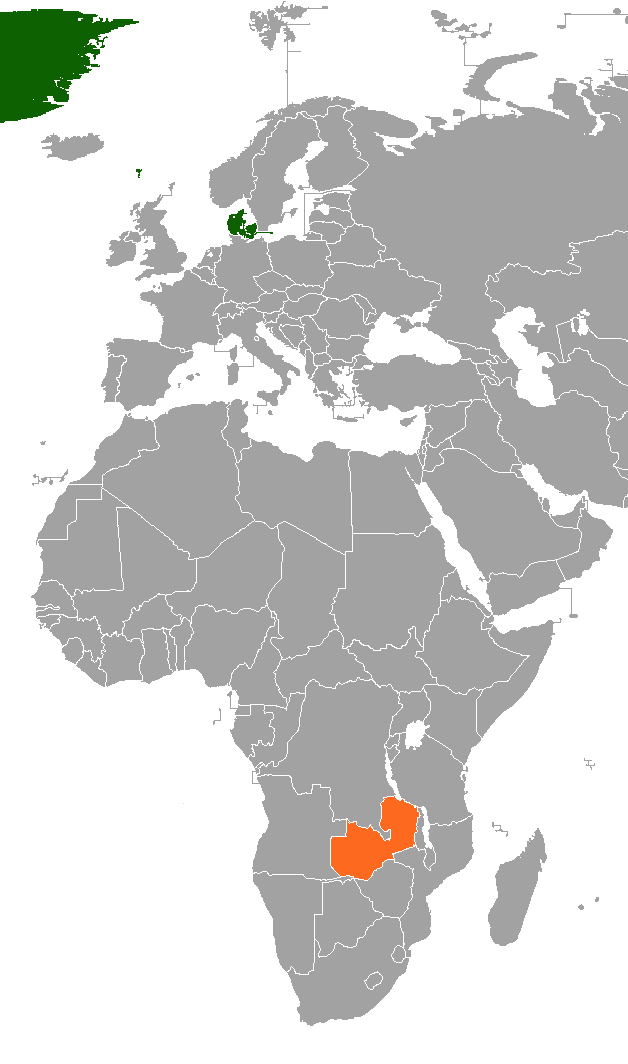
- Denmark: Zambia

Denmark–Zambia relations refers to the historical and current bilateral relationship between Denmark and Zambia. Denmark has an embassy in Lusaka, and Zambia is represented in Denmark, through its embassy in Stockholm, Sweden. In 1980, relations were described as "warm".

== Danish assistance ==
The first agreement between Denmark and Zambia was on 17 January 1959. In 1966, Denmark with some other countries sent some trucks to Zambia, and ships. On 12 December 1966 a technical agreement was signed. From 1966 to 1967, Denmark developed a dairy farm in Kabwe (Broken Hill) and Mkushi and assisted 500,000 DKK to the farm. In 1967, Denmark provided 2 million DKK for the Chilanga Cement. In the 1970s, Denmark and Zambia cooperated within agriculture and education. In 1974, Denmark, Sweden and the United Nations assisted Zambia with displaced women.

Danish assistance to Zambia is approximately 245 million DKK per year. Denmark supports Zambia with good governance, democracy and human rights, education, road and water programmes, environment, HIV/AIDS and support to refugees. Education is one of the priorities in the Danish support to Zambia. The assistance began in 2000, and US$21 million have been given to the sector. In 2008 both countries signed an Environment and Natural Resources Management and 120 million DKK was assisted to support the Zambian government and civil society organisations. The assistance consists of three components; Capacity Development, Interim Environment Fund and Civil Society Organisation Environment Fund.

== High level visits ==
In November 1964, Zambian President Kenneth Kaunda canceled a trip to Denmark because of his heavy schedule, but Kaunda visited Denmark in an official visit in 1968. 10 Danish politicians visited Zambia and Zimbabwe in 2010.

== Economic relations ==
In 2008, Danish exports to Zambia amounted to 16 million DKK while Zambian exports to Denmark amounted to 13 million DKK. All imports from Zambia to Denmark are duty-free and quota-free, with the exception of armaments, as part of the Everything but Arms initiative of the European Union.

== Resident diplomatic missions ==
- Denmark is accredited to Zambia from its embassy in Pretoria, South Africa.
- Zambia is accredited to Denmark from its embassy in Stockholm, Sweden.

== See also ==
- Foreign relations of Denmark
- Foreign relations of Zambia
- Water supply and sanitation in Zambia
