= Netherlands–Zambia relations =

- Netherlands: Zambia

Netherlands–Zambia relations are the bilateral relations between the Netherlands and Zambia. Diplomatic ties were established on November 2, 1965. The Netherlands and Zambia enjoy warm relations, with the Netherlands viewing Zambia as a beacon of stability in the region. The two nations mainly work together on health and education. There are around 100 private Dutch organizations operating in Zambia.

== History ==
=== 1950s-1960s ===
In 1961 a Dutch consulate was set up in Ndola; after Zambian independence, the government demanded the consulate be moved from Ndola to Lusaka, the capital. After demand for the consulate to be upgraded to an embassy, it was upgraded to an embassy in 1965.

In 1966, two years after Zambian independence, Zambian president, Kenneth Kaunda, asked for Dutch volunteers. The Netherlands and Zambia signed an agreement on Dutch volunteers in Zambia. High amounts of Dutch settlers in the Western Province of Zambia, got it the nickname of the 13th Dutch province. Dutch people who has came to help Zambia develop, stayed and resided in Zambia. After Zambian independence, there were 1,200 Dutch residents, just behind the United Kingdom and South Africa.

=== 1970s-Present ===
In 2013, the Dutch embassy in Lusaka closed.

On January 13, 2026, both nations met in Lusaka to discuss strengthening cooperation, partnership, and bilateral relations.

After the re-election of Hakainde Hichilema as president of Zambia, King Willem-Alexander of the Netherlands congratulated Hichilema on his re-election, and expressed hope that the Netherlands and Zambia could continue to develop relation.

== Trade ==
In 2024, the Netherlands exported $42.6M worth of goods to Zambia. Their top export was packaged medicaments, which totaled $4.66M. In the same year, Zambia exported $27.1M worth of goods to the Netherlands. Their top export was cut flowers which totaled $10.6M.

== High-level visits ==
=== High level visits from Zambia to the Netherlands ===
- Kenneth Kaunda

== Diplomatic missions ==
- The Netherlands is accredited to Zambia through its embassy in Harare. The Netherlands maintains an honorary consulate in Lusaka.
- Zambia is accredited to the Netherlands through its embassy in Brussels.

== See also ==
- Foreign relations of the Netherlands
- Foreign relations of Zambia
