= List of diplomatic missions in Zambia =

This is a list of diplomatic missions in Zambia. The capital Lusaka currently hosts 43 embassies/high commissions.

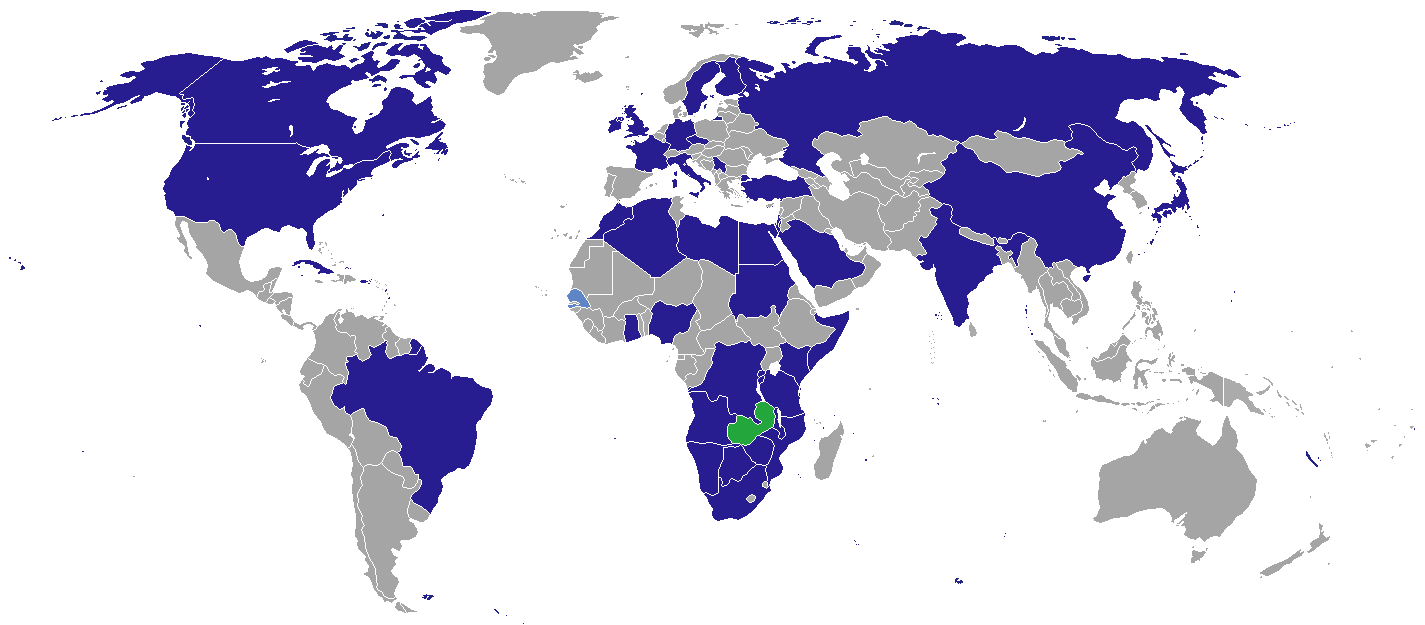
Map of diplomatic missions in Zambia

== Diplomatic missions in Lusaka ==
=== Embassies/High Commissions ===
1. Algeria
2. Angola
3. Botswana
4. Brazil
5. Burundi
6. Canada
7. China
8. Cuba
9. Congo-Kinshasa
10. Czechia
11. Egypt
12. Finland
13. France
14. Germany
15. Ghana
16. Holy See
17. India
18. Ireland
19. Israel
20. Italy
21. Japan
22. Kenya
23. Libya
24. Malawi
25. Morocco
26. Mozambique
27. Namibia
28. Nigeria
29. Palestine
30. Russia
31. Rwanda
32. Saudi Arabia
33. Serbia
34. Somalia
35. South Africa
36. Sudan
37. Sweden
38. Tanzania
39. Turkey
40. United Arab Emirates
41. United Kingdom
42. United States
43. Zimbabwe

=== Other posts ===
1. European Union (Delegation)
2. United Nations (Resident Coordinator's Office)

=== Gallery ===
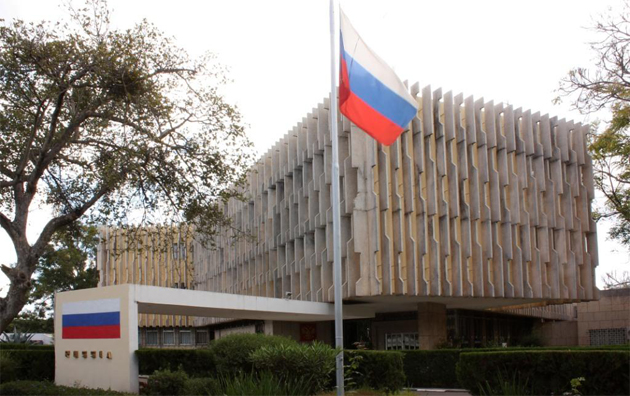
Embassy of Russia in Lusaka

== Consulates-General ==
=== Lusaka ===
1. Senegal

=== Mongu, Western Province ===
1. Angola

=== Ndola, Copperbelt Province ===
1. Congo-Kinshasa

=== Solwezi, North-Western Province ===
1. Angola

== Non-resident embassies and high commissions accredited to Zambia ==
=== Resident in Dar es Salaam, Tanzania ===
1. Belgium
2. Oman
3. Slovakia
4. Uganda

=== Resident in Luanda, Angola ===
1. Gabon
2. Guinea
3. Ivory Coast
4. Venezuela

=== Resident in Harare, Zimbabwe ===
1. Australia
2. Belarus
3. Equatorial Guinea
4. Ethiopia
5. Greece
6. Indonesia
7. Malaysia
8. Netherlands
9. Nicaragua
10. Portugal
11. South Korea
12. Spain
13. Switzerland

=== Resident in Pretoria, South Africa ===
1. Argentina
2. Bangladesh
3. Bulgaria
4. Burkina Faso
5. Cameroon
6. Chile
7. Colombia
8. Croatia
9. Cyprus
10. Denmark
11. Eritrea
12. Hungary
13. Jamaica
14. Lesotho
15. Liberia
16. Mexico
17. New Zealand
18. Paraguay
19. Peru
20. Philippines
21. Poland
22. Romania
23. Seychelles
24. Trinidad and Tobago
25. Ukraine

=== Resident elsewhere ===
1. Austria (Nairobi)
2. Chad (Kinshasa)
3. Djibouti (Nairobi)
4. Iceland (Reykjavík)
5. Norway (Lilongwe)

=== Unconfirmed ===
- Central African Republic (Pretoria)
- Eswatini (Pretoria)
- Guatemala (Pretoria)
- Guinea (Kinshasa)
- Haiti (Pretoria)
- Mali (Luanda)
- Maldives (New Delhi)
- Malta (Valletta)
- Sierra Leone (Nairobi)
- Syria (Pretoria)
- Thailand (Pretoria)
- Turkmenistan (Riyadh)
- Vietnam (Luanda)

== Closed missions ==
Host city	Sending country	Mission	Year closed	Ref.
Lusaka	Australia	High Commission	1991	
Lusaka	Austria	Embassy	1989	
Lusaka	Chile	Embassy	Unknown	
Lusaka	Netherlands	Embassy	2013	
Lusaka	North Korea	Embassy	1995	
Lusaka	Norway	Embassy	2016	
Lusaka	Peru	Embassy	1990	
Lusaka	Portugal	Embassy	Unknown	
Lusaka	South Korea	Embassy	1998	

== See also ==
- Foreign relations of Zambia
- Bibliography of the history of Zambia § Foreign relations
- List of diplomatic missions of Zambia
