= Foreign relations of Zambia =

After independence in 1964 the foreign relations of Zambia were mostly focused on supporting anti-colonial and anti-apartheid movements in other countries in Southern Africa, namely the African National Congress, Zimbabwe African People’s Union, and South West Africa People's Organisation. During the Cold War Zambia was a member of the Non-Aligned Movement.

Zambia is a member of 44 international organizations, with the United Nations, World Trade Organization, African Union, Commonwealth of Nations and Southern African Development Community being among the most notable.

Zambia is involved in a border dispute concerning the convergence of the boundaries of Botswana, Namibia, Zambia and Zimbabwe. An additional dispute with the Democratic Republic of Congo concerns the Lunchinda-Pweto Enclave.

== History ==
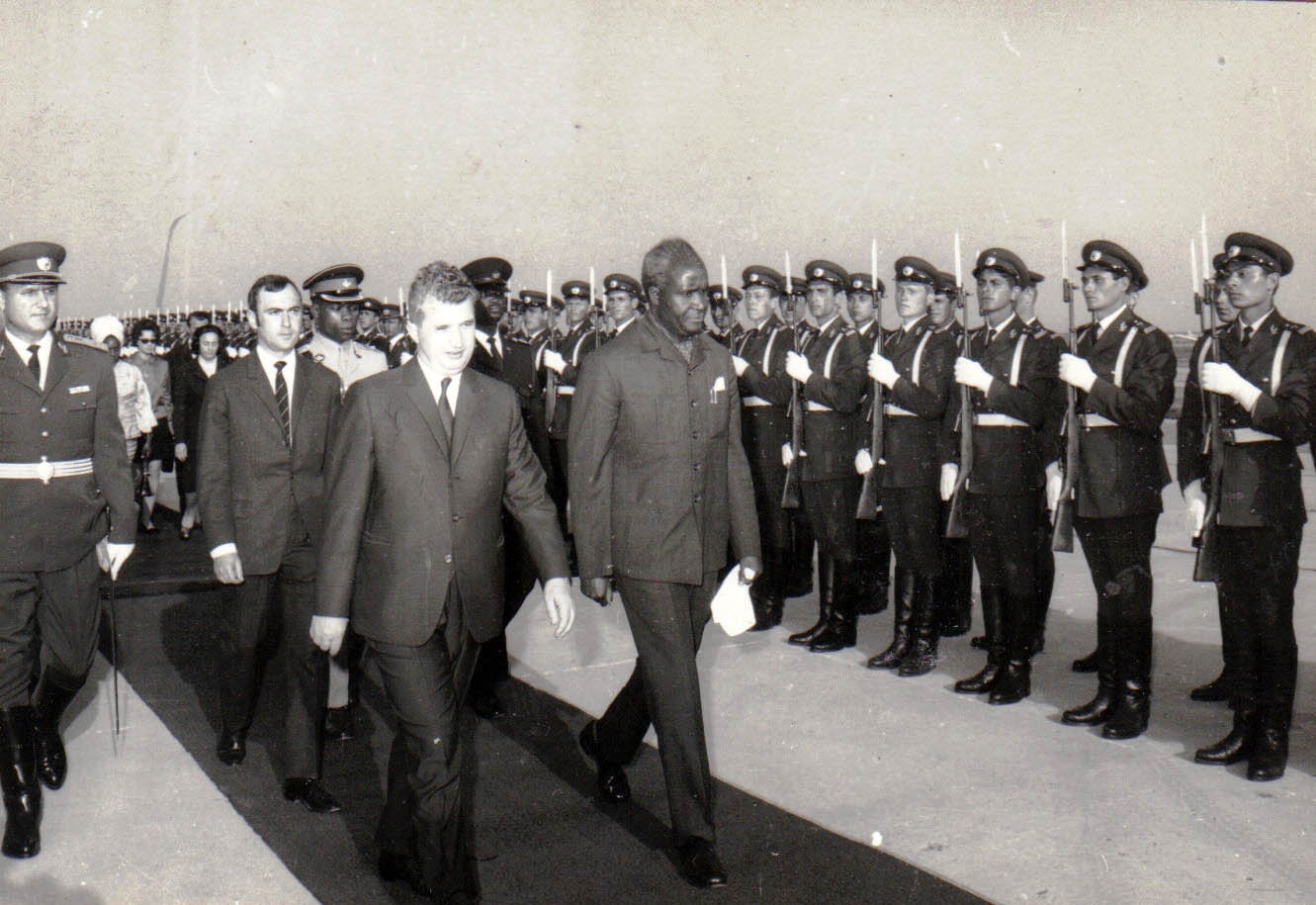
Kenneth Kaunda visiting communist Romania's leader, Nicolae Ceauşescu, in 1970.

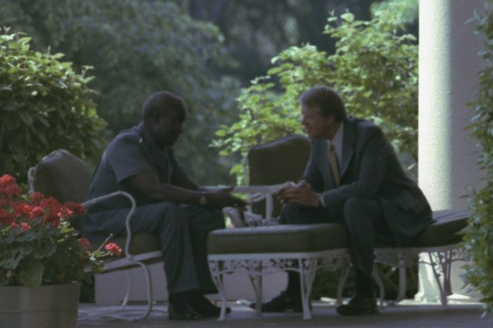
Kaunda talking privately with U.S. President Jimmy Carter at the White House in 1978

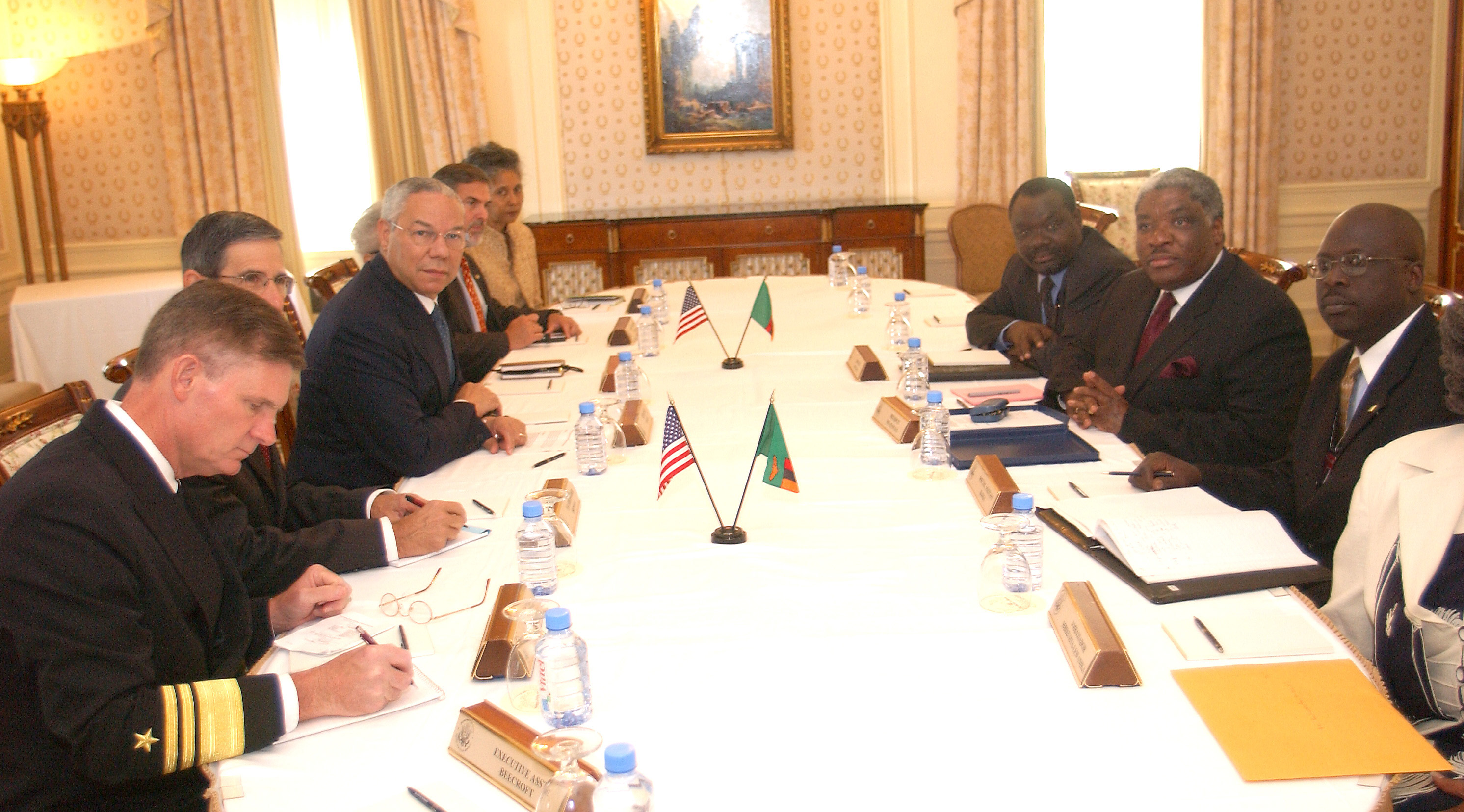
U.S. Secretary of State Colin Powell and President of Zambia Levy Mwanawasa meet in New York City during the 59th UN General Assembly.

After independence in 1964, Zambia was one of the most vocal opponents to white minority rule and colonialism. President Kenneth Kaunda, who held office 1964–1991, was a very visible advocate of change in Southern Africa. He actively supported UNITA during the Angolan liberation and civil war, SWAPO during their fight for Namibian independence from apartheid South Africa, Southern Rhodesia (now Zimbabwe), and the African National Congress in their fight against apartheid in South Africa.

Many of these organizations were based in Zambia during the 1970s and 1980s. For this reason South Africa as well as Rhodesia carried out military raids on targets inside Zambia. Zambia's support for the various liberation movements also caused problems for the Zambian economy, since it was heavily dependent on electricity supply and transportation through South Africa and Rhodesia. However these problems was partly solved by the Kariba Dam and the construction of the Chinese supported Tan-Zam railway.

For their part in the liberations struggles, Zambia enjoys wide popularity among the countries they supported as well as all over Africa. For instance, former South African president Nelson Mandela often referred to the debt South Africa owes Zambia.

Before Zambian independence, Kaunda met with John F Kennedy while visiting the United States in 1961, and he would meet with Lyndon Johnson, Gerald Ford, Jimmy Carter, Ronald Reagan, and George H.W. Bush at the White House during his long presidency. He also clashed with British prime minister Margaret Thatcher on several occasions, disliking her policy towards South Africa.

As with most African states, Zambia was a member of the Non-Aligned Movement during the Cold War, and is still today. The country hosted the 3rd Summit of the Non-Aligned Movement in 1970. In practice Zambia was more to the left than to the right during the Cold War. The country had good relations with China and with Yugoslavia. Kaunda is famous in Yugoslavia for crying openly at president Josip Broz Tito's funeral.

Kaunda's successor, president Frederick Chiluba (1991–2002), also played an important role in African politics. His government played a constructive regional role sponsoring Angola peace talks that led to the 1994 Lusaka Protocols. Zambia has provided troops to UN peacekeeping initiatives in Mozambique, Rwanda, Angola, and Sierra Leone. Zambia was the first African state to cooperate with the International Tribunal investigation of the 1994 Rwanda genocide.

In 1998, Zambia took the lead in efforts to establish a cease-fire in the Democratic Republic of Congo (DRC). Zambia was active in the Congolese peace effort after the signing of a cease-fire agreement in Lusaka in July and August 1999, although activity diminished considerably after the Joint Military Commission tasked with implementing the ceasefire relocated to Kinshasa in September 2001.

== International organizations ==
Zambia is a member of 45 international organisations. These are:

- Lomé Convention (ACP)
- African Development Bank (AfDB)
- African Union (AU)
- Commonwealth of Nations (CN)
- Food and Agriculture Organization (FAO)
- Group of 77 (G-77)
- International Atomic Energy Agency (IAEA)
- International Bank for Reconstruction and Development (IBRD)
- International Civil Aviation Organization (ICAO)
- International Criminal Court (ICCt)
- International Confederation of Free Trade Unions (ICFTU)
- ICRM
- International Development Association (IDA)
- International Fund for Agricultural Development (IFAD)
- International Finance Corporation (IFC)
- International Federation of Red Cross and Red Crescent Societies (IFRCS)
- International Labour Organization (ILO)
- International Monetary Fund (IMF)
- Interpol
- International Olympic Committee (IOC)
- International Organization for Migration (IOM)
- International Organization for Standardization (ISO, correspondent)
- International Telecommunication Union (ITU)
- United Nations Mission in the Democratic Republic of Congo (MONUC)
- Non-Aligned Movement (NAM)
- Organisation for the Prohibition of Chemical Weapons (OPCW)
- Permanent Court of Arbitration (PCA)
- Southern African Development Community (SADC)
- United Nations (UN)
- United Nations Mission in Sierra Leone (UNAMSIL)
- United Nations Conference on Trade and Development (UNCTAD)
- United Nations Educational, Scientific and Cultural Organization (UNESCO)
- United Nations Industrial Development Organization (UNIDO)
- United Nations Mission in Ethiopia and Eritrea (UNMEE)
- United Nations Interim Administration Mission in Kosovo (UNMIK)
- United Nations Mission in Liberia (UNMIL)
- Universal Postal Union (UPU)
- WCL
- World Customs Organization (WCO)
- World Health Organization (WHO)
- World Intellectual Property Organization (WIPO)
- World Meteorological Organization (WMO)
- World Tourism Organization (WToO)
- World Trade Organization (WTrO)

Concerning Zambia's membership in the ICC, Zambia has a Bilateral Immunity Agreement of protection for the United States military from prosecution.

=== United Nations ===
Zambia joined the United Nations on 1 December 1964, only a month after the nation had become independent. Zambia has a permanent mission to the UN, with headquarters on 237 East 52nd Street, New York City. The head of the mission is Tens Chisola Kapoma.

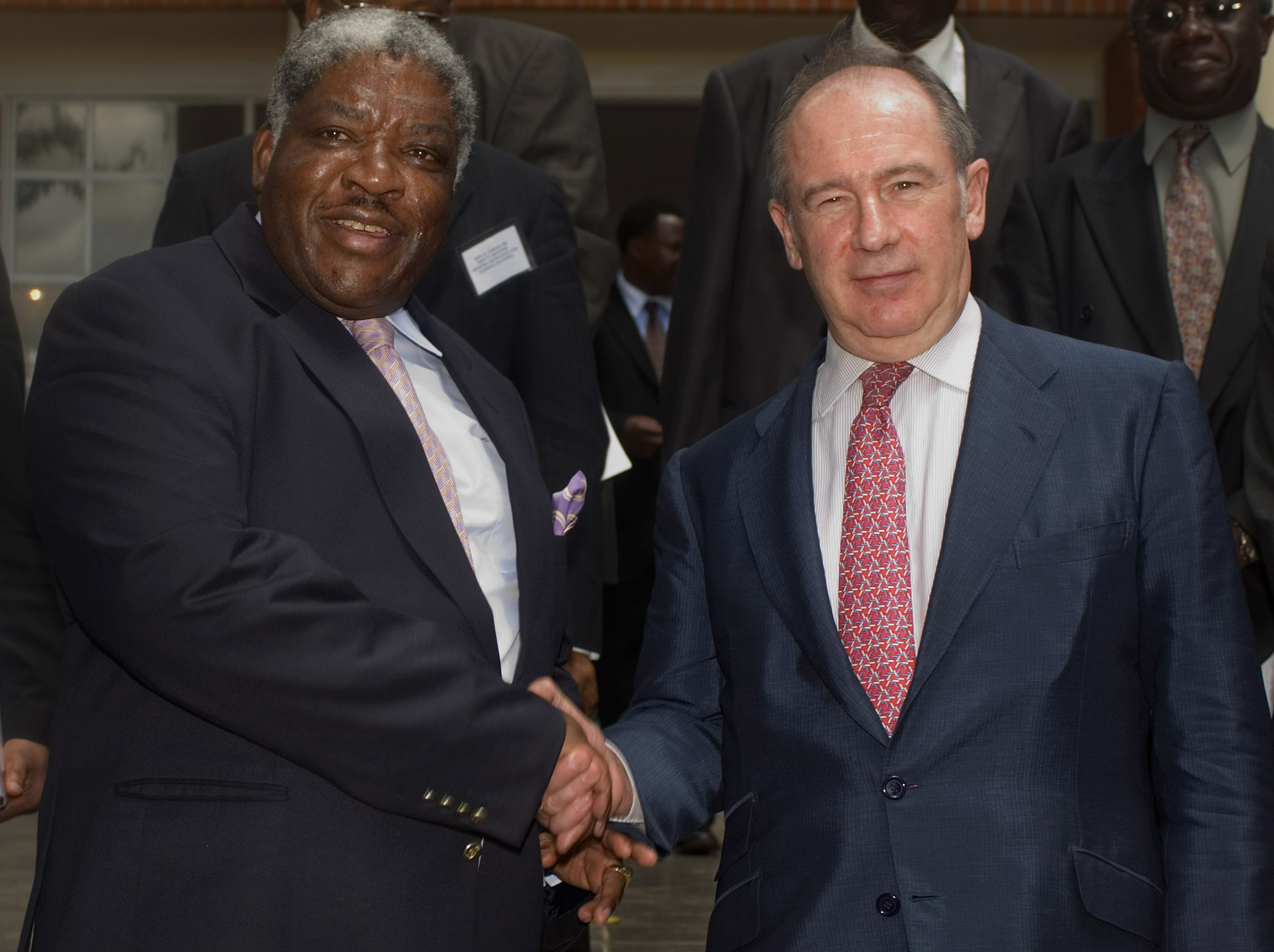
International Monetary Fund managing director Rodrigo Rato meeting with the Republic of Zambia's President Levy Mwanawasa.

== Regional diplomacy ==
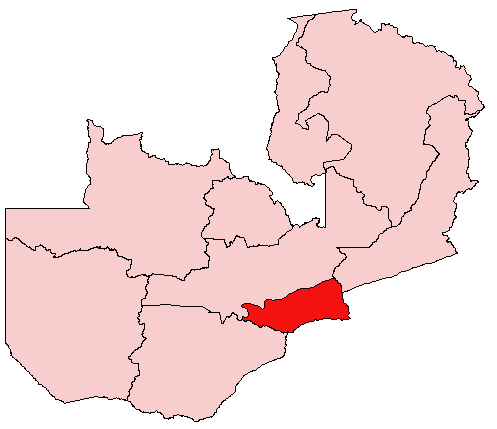
Lusaka province, the capital of Zambia

Following the independence of Zambia on 24 October 1964, the country has lent military aid and support to numerous movements and governments on the international stage. Most notably, Zambia has a history of providing military aid to combatants and political parties fighting for independence throughout Africa. The aid that Zambia has provided for African nationalistic movements during the colonial era revolves around both military and diplomatic arrangement for liberation and peace. The Zambian Defense Force (ZDF), which consists of the Zambian Army, Zambian Air force and Zambian National Service, has played a key part in a multitude of key regional and international conflicts throughout the 1970s and 1980s. Most notably, the Zambian military has provided counter insurgent efforts during major African confrontations such as the Rhodesian Bush War despite not being the main belligerent.

Zambia has a history of supporting regional liberation movements and Former President Kenneth Kaunda had previously decreed that "Zambia will not be independent and free until the rest of Africa is Free". As a large central nation, the governability of Zambia relies on the stability and diplomacy of nearby states that surround Zambia. Nevertheless, in the late 1970s, Kaunda's regime actively confronted the so-called "White South" regimes which controlled South Africa, Rhodesia and Namibia, forming part of the Frontline States alliance. Regional stability allowed Former President Kenneth Kaunda to maintain power in the relatively poor nation for several decades.

=== Liberation and political support ===
Zambia received its own liberation from colonialism relatively early from Britain. The newly formed Zambian government under President Kenneth Kaunda of the UNIP party was active in the liberation and disputes of its neighbors for decades following its independence. The Zambian government offered shelter for revolutionaries, mediated treaty signings and offered aid and weapons. The continuation of colonial rule in Southern Africa was seen as a slight to Zambia and inherent feelings of African unity drove the new nation to aid its neighbors resist colonial rule.

Most notably, Zambia was a haven for revolutionaries from the Namibia liberation party, South West African People's Organization (SWAPO) and the African National Congress (ANC) in South Africa. Zambia provided a rear base for revolutionaries as well as administrative and political aid.

==== SWAPO ====
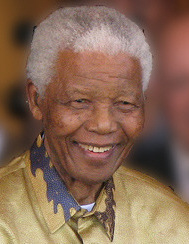
Former President of South Africa, Nelson Mandela had previously expressed the important role Zambia played in post-apartheid South Africa

The South West African People's Organization (SWAPO) is a political party that was formerly an independence movement based in Namibia. Due to pressures from within Namibia, SWAPO moved its headquarters and much of its forces into neighboring Zambia in the 1970s. Zambia became a safe haven for the group and SWAPO set up guerrilla training camps and sent exiled members into Zambia. The Shipanga Crisis, so named for senior SWAPO leader Andreas Shipanga, saw the Zambian government help round up thousands of dissidents and critics of the movement. SWAPO leaders in Namibia saw growing dissent in the SWAPO installations and guerrilla camps in Zambia, and appealed to then President Kaunda for help. After rounding up thousands of perceived rebels, including Shipanga with the aid of Zambia, SWAPO leadership in Namibia became markedly more authoritarian.

==== African National Congress ====
The African National Congress was an anti-apartheid political party based in South Africa, with close ideological ties to the Zambian African National Congress of President Kenneth Kaunda. When the political party was banned in South Africa by the colonial government, many of its leaders went underground or fled to Zambia. Lusaka, the capital of Zambia, became the new headquarters for many ANC leaders in exile from their native South Africa. Zambia thus developed a legacy of being the center of activity for South African liberation and allowed exiled leaders to convene and organize. Former South African President Nelson Mandela had expressed the important role that Zambia played in the liberation of their country during the years of exile. Zambia's policy of liberation through diplomacy and discreet support for African nationalist movements within the region is most poignant in the South African case.

==== Zimbabwe ====
Zambia has also provided key support to the liberation struggles of nearby Zimbabwe from their colonial rulers in the 1960s to 1970s. Specifically, Zambia provided armed and diplomatic support to Zimbabwe African People's Union (ZAPU) and the Zimbabwe African National Union (ZANU) during their struggles against the unrecognized rogue state Rhodesian government in the Rhodesian Bush War. Zambia provided limited arms and training towards Zimbabwe's African nationalist movements, but largely applied diplomatic approaches to induce liberation in Zimbabwe. This included multiple visits and discussion between the Rhodesian government and Zambia leaders to negotiate a resolution to the civil strife within the country. Eventually, in 1979, the Rhodesian government submitted to international pressures and conducted elections that lead to majority rule and the eventual renaming of the country as Zimbabwe.

==== UNITA ====
The National Union for the Total Independence of Angola (UNITA) was a party in Angola that served as one of the main belligerents in the Angolan Civil War of 1975 against People's Movement for the Liberation of Angola (MPLA). Zambia, under Kenneth Kaunda trained and funded UNITA against the MPLA during the civil war. Lusaka remained one of the most ardent supporters of the UNITA African nationalists and UNITA troops trained in Zambia. Since then, Zambia has rescinded its historical support of UNITA and has apologized to the current Angolan government over the historical support of UNITA.

=== Roles in regional disputes ===
==== Angolan Civil War ====
Zambia was key in facilitating talks between People's Movement for the Liberation of Angola (MPLA) and the National Union for the Total Independence of Angola (UNITA) of the Angolan Civil War. The Angolan Civil War waged on from 1975 onward and involved massive foreign intervention in the face of the Cold War. Initiated by Zambia, the Lusaka Protocol was a treaty that attempted to end the Civil War by disarmament and national reconciliation. The treaty was signed in Lusaka on 20 November 1994 and garnered international support, as well as support from Zimbabwean President Robert Mugabe and South African President Nelson Mandela. Ultimately the fighting resumed, and by 1998, the peace process ceased.

==== The Second Congo War ====
The Second Congo war was a major African continental war that began in the Democratic Republic of Congo in 1998, and involved nine different African countries. Zambia was not a belligerent in this military engagement, but sought to facilitate peace and an end to the fighting. Representatives from various international organizations such as the United Nations, met on 21–27 June 1999 in Lusaka in order to draft a resolution to the conflict. The ceasefire agreement set to end the fighting, deploy peacekeeping forces and release prisoners of war on both sides of the fighting. Heads of state from Angola, the Democratic Republic of the Congo, Namibia, Rwanda, Uganda, Zambia, and Zimbabwe convened in Lusaka, Zambia on 10 July 1999 to sign the Lusaka Ceasefire Agreement. Ultimately hostilities continued despite the passage of the Peace Agreement, and the official fighting did not resolve itself until 2003.

=== African cooperation ===
Zambia is a member of the Organization of African Unity (OAU), now known as the African Union, and was its chairman until July 2002. Zambia also takes part in the unions economical cooperation, the African Economic Community (AEC). Among the AEC's different pillars, Zambia takes part in two; Southern African Development Community (SADC) and the preferential trade area Common Market for Eastern and Southern Africa (COMESA). The country is also a member of the Port Management Association of Eastern and Southern Africa (PMAESA).

SADC was founded in Zambia's capital Lusaka on 1 April 1980, and COMESA has its headquarters there as well.

== International disputes ==
A dormant dispute remains where Botswana, Namibia, Zambia, and Zimbabwe's boundaries converge; and with the DRC in the Lunchinda-Pweto Enclave in the North of Chienge following concerns on the Zambia-Congo Delimitation Treaty raised with the late President Laurent Kabila. The lack of demarcation beacons, and the citizenship rights of people in that enclave remain thorny issues, especially in Luapula Province.

== Zambia and the Commonwealth of Nations ==
Zambia has been a republic in the Commonwealth of Nations since 24 October 1964, when Northern Rhodesia became independent.

== Diplomatic relations ==
List of countries which Zambia maintains diplomatic relations with:

#	Country	Date
1	United Kingdom	24 October 1964
2	United States	24 October 1964
3	Democratic Republic of the Congo	24 October 1964
4	France	24 October 1964
5	Germany	24 October 1964
6	Serbia	24 October 1964
7	China	29 October 1964
8	Japan	29 October 1964
9	Russia	30 October 1964
10	Sweden	27 November 1964
11	Ghana	30 November 1964
12	Egypt	15 December 1964
13	Tanzania	7 January 1965
14	Czech Republic	2 February 1965
15	Norway	2 February 1965
16	Denmark	10 February 1965
17	Belgium	12 February 1965
18	Philippines	26 February 1965
19	Israel	17 March 1965
20	Austria	18 March 1965
21	India	April 1965
—	Holy See	15 May 1965
22	Ethiopia	8 July 1965
23	Chile	29 July 1965
24	Netherlands	2 November 1965
25	Nigeria	1965
26	Canada	13 April 1966
27	Italy	10 May 1966
28	Switzerland	10 June 1966
29	Poland	1 July 1966
30	Hungary	13 August 1966
31	Botswana	28 November 1966
32	Kenya	1966
33	Uganda	1966
34	Lebanon	3 February 1967
35	Guinea	10 November 1967
36	Finland	8 March 1968
37	Ivory Coast	10 April 1968
38	Romania	28 May 1968
39	Somalia	7 July 1968
40	Bulgaria	20 October 1968
41	North Korea	12 April 1969
42	Senegal	25 April 1969
43	Syria	15 May 1969
44	Albania	9 July 1969
45	Spain	26 September 1969
46	Brazil	28 December 1969
47	Malawi	15 September 1970
48	Peru	5 October 1970
49	Guyana	11 February 1971
50	Trinidad and Tobago	17 February 1971
51	Sierra Leone	19 February 1971
52	Jamaica	25 February 1971
53	Turkey	25 February 1971
54	Barbados	1 March 1971
55	Eswatini	31 March 1971
56	Mauritania	30 April 1971
57	Liberia	3 April 1972
58	Cameroon	21 April 1972
59	Australia	18 May 1972
60	Cuba	19 July 1972
61	Vietnam	15 September 1972
62	Niger	29 September 1972
63	Malta	17 October 1972
64	Morocco	1972
65	Pakistan	1972
66	Tunisia	1972
67	Republic of the Congo	12 January 1973
68	Algeria	15 January 1973
69	Rwanda	January 1973
70	Burundi	13 March 1973
71	Sri Lanka	16 April 1973
72	Iran	7 July 1973
73	Madagascar	13 September 1973
74	Lesotho	19 September 1973
75	Benin	8 February 1974
76	Argentina	27 September 1974
77	United Arab Emirates	29 November 1974
78	Mauritius	29 December 1974
79	Gambia	30 December 1974
80	Iraq	1974
81	Sudan	1974
82	Haiti	6 March 1975
83	Bahamas	19 March 1975
84	Portugal	3 April 1975
85	Mozambique	25 June 1975
86	Gabon	18 July 1975
87	Mexico	15 October 1975
88	Kuwait	12 November 1975
89	Indonesia	18 November 1975
90	Cyprus	10 December 1976
91	Angola	3 May 1977
92	Saudi Arabia	1 May 1978
93	Mongolia	2 October 1978
94	Venezuela	2 November 1978
95	Greece	15 February 1979
96	Bangladesh	26 July 1979
97	Grenada	7 September 1979
98	Ireland	29 February 1980
99	Nicaragua	21 April 1980
100	Zimbabwe	30 April 1980
101	Oman	2 June 1982
102	Qatar	25 June 1982
103	Cape Verde	10 July 1982
104	Bahrain	24 January 1983
105	Antigua and Barbuda	2 March 1983
106	New Zealand	2 April 1985
107	Nepal	10 September 1986
108	Libya	1986
109	Bolivia	5 January 1987
110	São Tomé and Príncipe	31 August 1987
111	Mali	2 October 1987
112	Thailand	9 November 1987
113	Colombia	21 April 1988
114	Afghanistan	December 1988
115	Malaysia	26 February 1990
116	Namibia	5 August 1990
117	South Korea	4 September 1990
—	State of Palestine	20 February 1991
118	Ukraine	22 April 1993
119	Slovakia	5 May 1993
120	Kyrgyzstan	17 September 1993
121	Armenia	7 October 1993
122	Belarus	13 October 1993
123	Georgia	14 October 1993
124	Moldova	26 October 1993
125	Azerbaijan	18 November 1993
126	Turkmenistan	2 December 1993
127	Uzbekistan	1 February 1994
128	South Africa	10 May 1994
129	Eritrea	15 July 1994
130	Slovenia	26 January 1995
131	Bosnia and Herzegovina	20 March 1995
132	Croatia	20 September 1995
133	Tajikistan	31 October 1995
134	Kazakhstan	25 March 1996
135	Cambodia	8 May 1996
136	Luxembourg	24 October 1996
137	Laos	9 November 1996
138	Singapore	17 December 1996
139	Latvia	27 February 1997
140	Estonia	15 May 1997
141	Seychelles	11 March 1998
142	North Macedonia	30 March 1998
143	Lithuania	13 July 2001
144	Brunei	3 February 2003
145	Iceland	23 July 2004
146	Jordan	6 June 2006
147	Djibouti	11 December 2006
148	Comoros	22 February 2007
149	Yemen	22 November 2007
150	Montenegro	29 June 2010
151	Paraguay	28 September 2010
152	Burkina Faso	15 July 2011
153	Honduras	8 August 2011
154	Suriname	2 September 2011
155	Guatemala	19 March 2013
156	Ecuador	16 July 2013
157	Costa Rica	28 May 2014
158	South Sudan	16 February 2016
159	Central African Republic	28 August 2017
160	Maldives	1 April 2018
161	Equatorial Guinea	19 April 2018
162	Togo	23 March 2021
163	Dominican Republic	23 September 2024
164	Panama	24 September 2024
165	Saint Vincent and the Grenadines	24 September 2024
166	El Salvador	10 December 2024
167	Chad	4 September 2025
168	Liechtenstein	25 September 2025
169	Uruguay	21 September 2026
170	Vanuatu	21 September 2026
171	Andorra	22 September 2026
172	Belize	25 September 2026
—	Sovereign Military Order of Malta	25 September 2026

== Bilateral relations ==
=== Africa ===
Country	Formal Relations Began	Notes
Kenya	1966	See Kenya–Zambia relations Both countries established diplomatic relations in 1966 when has been accredited High Commissioner of Zambia to Kenya Mr. A. M. Simbule.: Kenya has a high commission in Lusaka.; Zambia has a high commission in Nairobi.
Namibia	5 August 1990	See Namibia–Zambia relations Both countries established diplomatic relations on 5 August 1990: Namibia has a high commission in Lusaka.; Zambia has a high commission in Windhoek.
South Africa	10 May 1994	Both countries established diplomatic relations on 10 May 1994 See South Africa–Zambia relations Zambia was a strong supporter of the African National Congress during their struggle against minority rule and hosted the ANC for a number of years. In 2009, nearly 52% of all goods imported to Zambia were from South Africa.: South Africa has a high commission in Lusaka.; Zambia has a high commission in Pretoria.
Tanzania	7 January 1965	See Tanzania–Zambia relations Both countries established diplomatic relations on 7 January 1965 when Zambia's first High Commissioner to Tanzania, Mr. A. M. Simbule presented his credentials to President Nyerere: Tanzania has a high commission in Lusaka.; Zambia has a high commission in Dar es Salaam.
Zimbabwe	30 April 1980	See Zambia–Zimbabwe relations Both countries established diplomatic relations on 30 April 1980: From 1953 to 1963 Zambia and Zimbabwe were, along with Nyasaland (now Malawi) part of the Federation of Rhodesia and Nyasaland.; Initially the two countries had good relations after gaining independence. However, relations have recently been strained. Following the controversial Zimbabwean presidential election of 2008, the late Zambian President Levy Mwanawasa described Mugabe's Zimbabwe as a "regional embarrassment".; The former foreign affairs minister, Kabinga Mpande, once said Zambia had lodged a protest against Zimbabwe, against the "sustained malicious campaign against Zambia". But relations have improved tremendously with the election of Michael Sata as President of Zambia. It was reported in the Zambian media that Zambia was pushing for the readmission of Zimbabwe into the British led Commonwealth of Nations.

=== Americas ===
Country	Formal Relations Began	Notes
Mexico	15 October 1975	Both countries established diplomatic relations on 15 October 1975: Mexico is accredited to Zambia from its embassy in Pretoria, South Africa.; Zambia is accredited to Mexico from its embassy in Washington, D.C., United States.
United States		See United States–Zambia relations Zambia, led by president Kenneth Kaunda and other diplomats such as Vernon Mwaanga, Mark Chona, and Siteke Mwale, cooperated closely with the United States between 1975 and 1984 in order to promote peaceful solutions to the conflicts in Angola, Rhodesia (Zimbabwe), and Namibia.: United States has an embassy in Lusaka.; Zambia has an embassy in Washington, D.C.

=== Asia ===
Country	Formal Relations Began	Notes
China	29 October 1964	Both countries established diplomatic relations on 29 October 1964 See China–Zambia relations: China has an embassy in Lusaka.; Zambia has an embassy in Beijing.
India	April 1965	See India-Zambia relations Both countries established diplomatic relations in April 1965 when first High Commissioner of India to Zambia Mr. C. Krishnamurti began his duties.: India has a high commission in Lusaka.; Zambia has a high commission in New Delhi.
Israel	17 March 1965	Both countries established diplomatic relations on 17 March 1965 when Israel's first ambassador to Zambia Col. Ben-Zion Tehan presented his credentials to the President Dr. Kenneth Kaunda. Zambia severed diplomatic relations with Israel on 26 October 1973. Diplomatic relations between two countries were re-established on 25 December 1991 Both countries have a number of bilateral agreements in force.
Turkey	25 February 1971	See Turkey–Zambia relations Both countries established diplomatic relations on 25 February 1971 when accredited first Ambassador of Turkey to Zambia (resident in Nairibi) Mr. Sadum Terem: Turkey has an embassy in Lusaka.; Zambia has an embassy in Ankara.; Trade volume between the two countries was 23.7 million USD in 2019 (Zambian exports/imports: 5.9/17.8 million USD).; There are direct flights from Istanbul to Lusaka since 14 December 2018.

=== Europe ===
Country	Formal Relations Began	Notes
Cyprus	10 December 1976	Both countries established diplomatic relations on 10 December 1976 when the first High Commissioner of Cyprus to Zambia, Mr. Fillios Antoniou Grammenopoulos, presented his credentials to President Kaunda: Cyprus is accredited to Zambia from its high commission in Pretoria, South Africa and an honorary consulate in Lusaka.; Zambia is accredited to Cyprus from its embassy in Rome, Italy and an honorary consulate in Limassol.; Both countries have a bilateral agreement on Air Service between both countries.; Both countries are full members of Commonwealth of Nations.
Denmark	10 February 1965	See Denmark-Zambia relations Both countries established diplomatic relations on 10 February 1965 when was accredited first Ambassador of Denmark to Zambia (resident in Nairibi) Mr. Birger Abrahamson: Denmark has an embassy in Lusaka.; Zambia is accredited to Denmark, from its embassy in Stockholm, Sweden.
Greece	1977	Greece is accredited to Zambia from its embassy in Harare, Zimbabwe and an honorary consulate in Lusaka.; Zambia is accredited to Greece from its embassy in London, United Kingdom.
Ireland	29 February 1980	See Ireland–Zambia relations Both countries established diplomatic relations on 29 February 1980 when Ireland's first Ambassador to Zambia, His Excellency Mr Michael Greene, presented credentials to President Kaunda: Ireland has an embassy in Lusaka.; Zambia is accredited to Ireland from its high commission in London
Poland	1 July 1966	See Poland–Zambia relations Both countries established diplomatic relations on 1 July 1966: Poland is accredited to Zambia from its embassy in Harare, Zimbabwe.; Zambia is accredited to Poland from its embassy in Berlin, Germany.
Russia	30 October 1964	See Russia–Zambia relations: Russia has an embassy in Lusaka.; Zambia has an embassy in Moscow.
United Kingdom	17 October 1964	See United Kingdom–Zambia relations Zambia established diplomatic relations with the United Kingdom on 17 October 1964.: Zambia maintains a high commission in London.; The United Kingdom is accredited to Zambia through its high commission in Lusaka.; The UK governed Zambia from 1911 to 1964, when Zambia achieved full independence. Both countries share common membership of the Commonwealth, and the World Trade Organization. Bilaterally the two countries have a Development Partnership, a Double Taxation Agreement, an Energy Africa Partnership Agreement, a Green Growth Compact, and have signed an Investment Agreement.

=== Oceania ===
Country	Formal Relations Began	Notes
Australia	18 May 1972	Both countries established diplomatic relations on 18 May 1972 when first Australian High Commissioner to Zambia Mr. W. G. A. Landale presented credentials (resident in Dar es Salaam): Australia is accredited to Zambia from its embassy in Harare, Zimbabwe.; Zambia has a High Commission in Canberra.; Both countries are full members of Commonwealth of Nations.
New Zealand	2 April 1985	Both countries established diplomatic relations on 2 April 1985: New Zealand is accredited to Zambia from its high commission in Pretoria, South Africa.; Zambia is accredited to New Zealand from its high commission in Canberra, Australia.; Both countries are full members of Commonwealth of Nations.

== See also ==
- Bibliography of the history of Zambia § Foreign relations
- History of Zambia
- Politics of Zambia
- Kenneth Kaunda
- African Union
- List of diplomatic missions in Zambia
- List of diplomatic missions of Zambia
