= List of diplomatic missions of Zambia =

This is a list of diplomatic missions of Zambia, excluding honorary consulates.

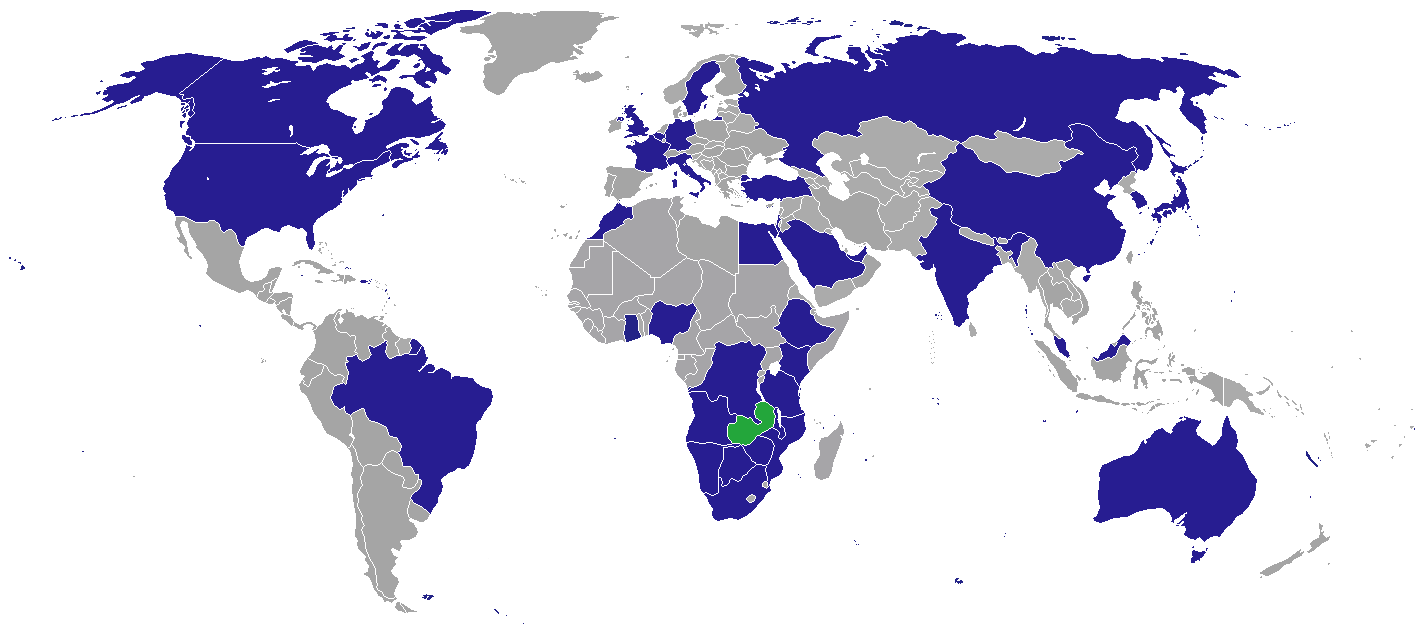
Diplomatic missions of Zambia

== Current missions ==
=== Africa ===
Host country	Host city	Mission	Concurrent accreditation	Ref.
Angola	Luanda	Embassy		
Angola	Luena	Consulate-General		
Botswana	Gaborone	High Commission	International Organizations: Southern African Development Community	
Congo-Kinshasa	Kinshasa	Embassy	Countries: Central African Republic; Gabon	
Congo-Kinshasa	Lubumbashi	Consulate-General	Countries: Central African Republic; Gabon	
Egypt	Cairo	Embassy	Countries: Algeria; Iran; Lebanon; Libya; Palestine; Syria; Tunisia	
Ethiopia	Addis Ababa	Embassy	Countries: Djibouti; Sudan; International Organizations: African Union	
Ghana	Accra	High Commission	Countries: Ivory Coast; Liberia; Sierra Leone; Togo	
Kenya	Nairobi	High Commission	Countries: Eritrea; Seychelles; South Sudan; International Organizations: United Nations; United Nations Environment Programme; United Nations Human Settlements Programme	
Malawi	Lilongwe	High Commission		
Morocco	Rabat	Embassy		
Morocco	Laayoune	Consulate-General		
Mozambique	Maputo	High Commission	Countries: Eswatini; Mauritius	
Namibia	Windhoek	High Commission		
Nigeria	Abuja	High Commission	Countries: Benin; Burkina Faso; Chad; Mali; Mauritania; Niger; Sahrawi Republic; Senegal; International Organizations: Economic Community of West African States (Note: Accredited as an observer mission.)	
South Africa	Pretoria	High Commission	Countries: Lesotho; Madagascar	
Tanzania	Dar Es Salaam	High Commission	Countries: Burundi; Rwanda; Uganda	
Zimbabwe	Harare	Embassy		

=== Americas ===
Host country	Host city	Mission	Concurrent accreditation	Ref.
Brazil	Brasília	Embassy	Countries: Chile; Ecuador; Paraguay; Peru; Suriname; Venezuela	
Canada	Ottawa	High Commission	Countries: Bahamas; Barbados; Cuba; Trinidad and Tobago	
United States	Washington, D.C.	Embassy	Countries: Belize; Costa Rica; El Salvador; Guatemala; Haiti; Honduras; Jamaica; Mexico; Nicaragua; Panama	

=== Asia ===
Host country	Host city	Mission	Concurrent accreditation	Ref.
China	Beijing	Embassy	Countries: Afghanistan; Mongolia; North Korea	
China	Guangzhou	Consulate-General	Countries: Afghanistan; Mongolia; North Korea	
India	New Delhi	High Commission	Countries: Bangladesh; Maldives; Myanmar; Nepal; Singapore; Sri Lanka	
Israel	Tel Aviv	Embassy		
Japan	Tokyo	Embassy		
Malaysia	Kuala Lumpur	High Commission	Countries: Brunei; Cambodia; Indonesia; Laos; Philippines; Thailand; Vietnam	
Qatar	Doha	Embassy		
Saudi Arabia	Riyadh	Embassy	Countries: Bahrain; Kuwait; Oman	
South Korea	Seoul	Embassy		
Turkey	Ankara	Embassy	Countries: Azerbaijan; Georgia; Jordan; North Macedonia	
United Arab Emirates	Abu Dhabi	Embassy		
United Arab Emirates	Dubai	Consulate-General		

=== Europe ===
Host country	Host city	Mission	Concurrent accreditation	Ref.
Belgium	Brussels	Embassy	Countries: Luxembourg; Netherlands; International Organizations: European Union	
France	Paris	Embassy	Countries: Bosnia and Herzegovina; Bulgaria; Portugal; Romania; Serbia; Spain; International Organizations: UNESCO; World Tourism Organization	
Germany	Berlin	Embassy	Countries: Austria; Czech Republic; Hungary; Poland; Slovakia; Slovenia	
Italy	Rome	Embassy	Countries: Albania; Croatia; Cyprus; Greece; Malta; International Organizations: Food and Agriculture Organization; International Fund for Agricultural Development; World Food Programme	
Russia	Moscow	Embassy	Countries: Armenia; Kazakhstan; Moldova; Tajikistan	
Sweden	Stockholm	Embassy	Countries: Denmark; Estonia; Finland; Iceland; Latvia; Lithuania; Norway	
United Kingdom	London	High Commission	Countries: Holy See; Ireland	

=== Oceania ===
Host country	Host city	Mission	Concurrent accreditation	Ref.
Australia	Canberra	High Commission	Countries: New Zealand	

=== Multilateral organizations ===
Organization	Host city	Host country	Mission	Concurrent accreditation	Ref.
United Nations	New York City	United States	Permanent Mission		
United Nations	Geneva	Switzerland	Permanent Mission	Countries: Switzerland; International Organizations: World Trade Organization	

== Gallery ==
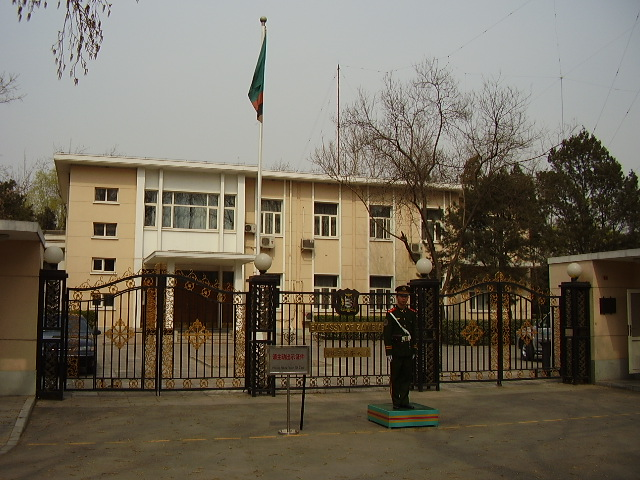
Embassy in Beijing

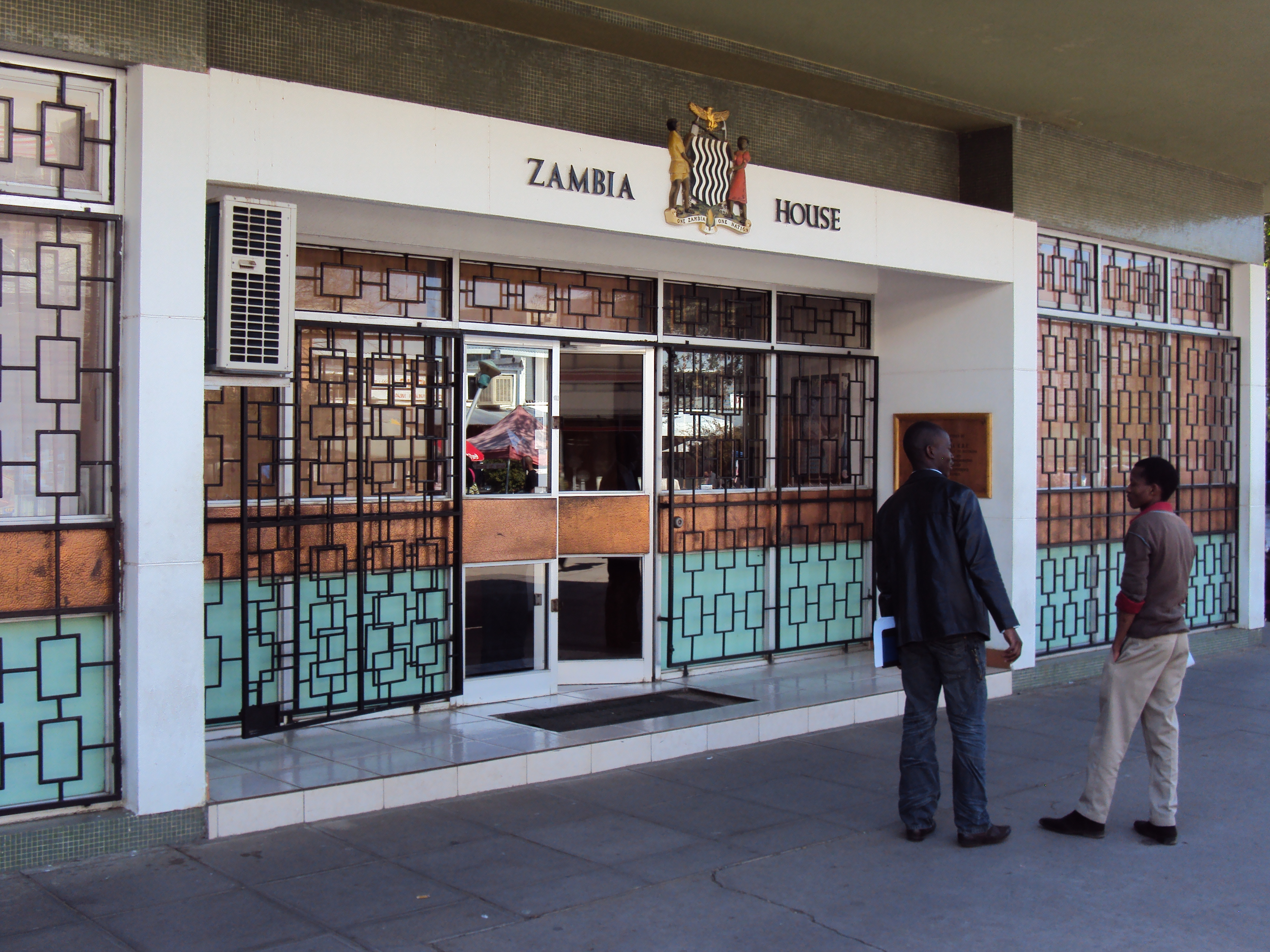
High Commission in Gaborone

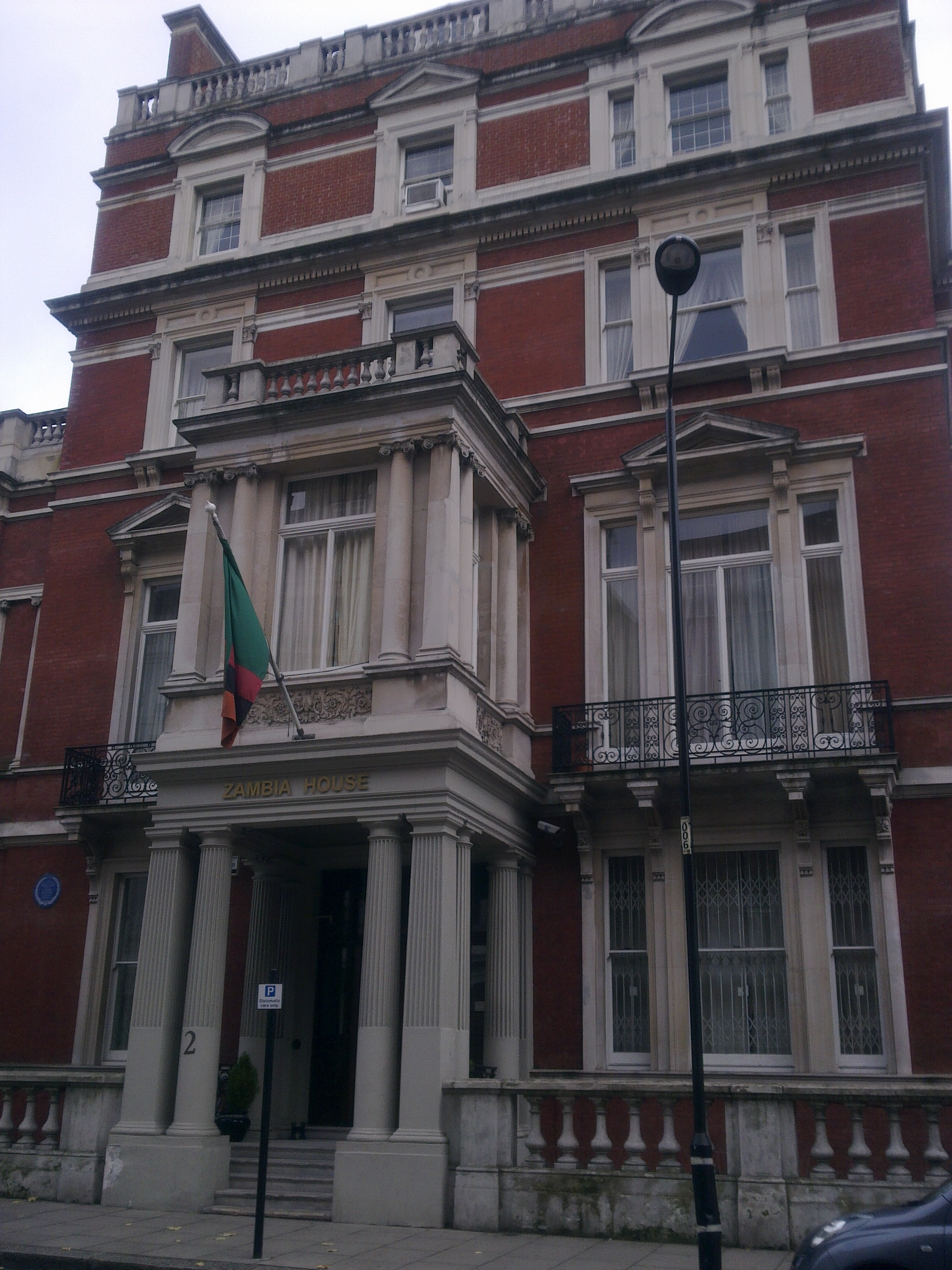
High Commissions in London

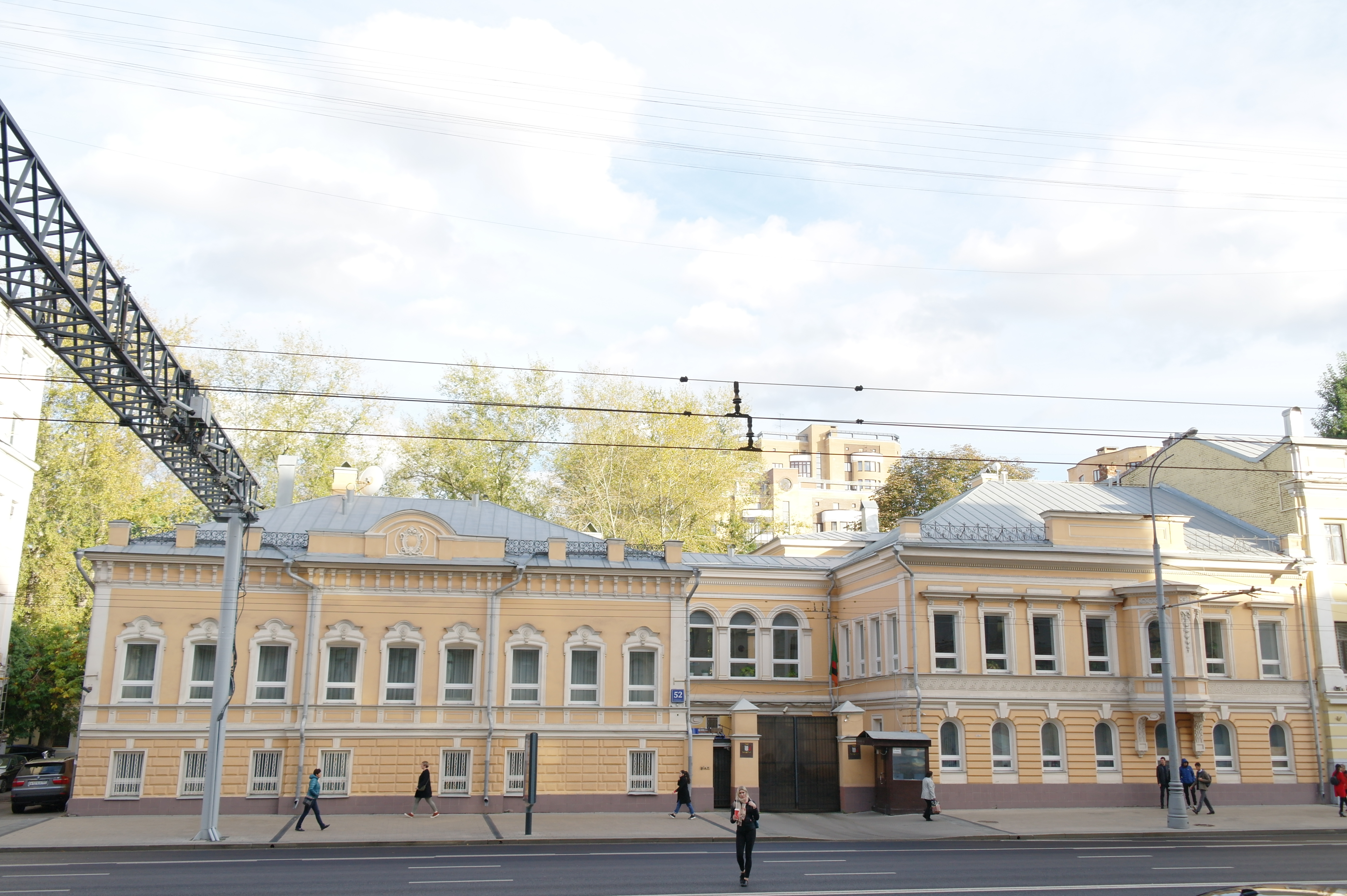
Embassy in Moscow

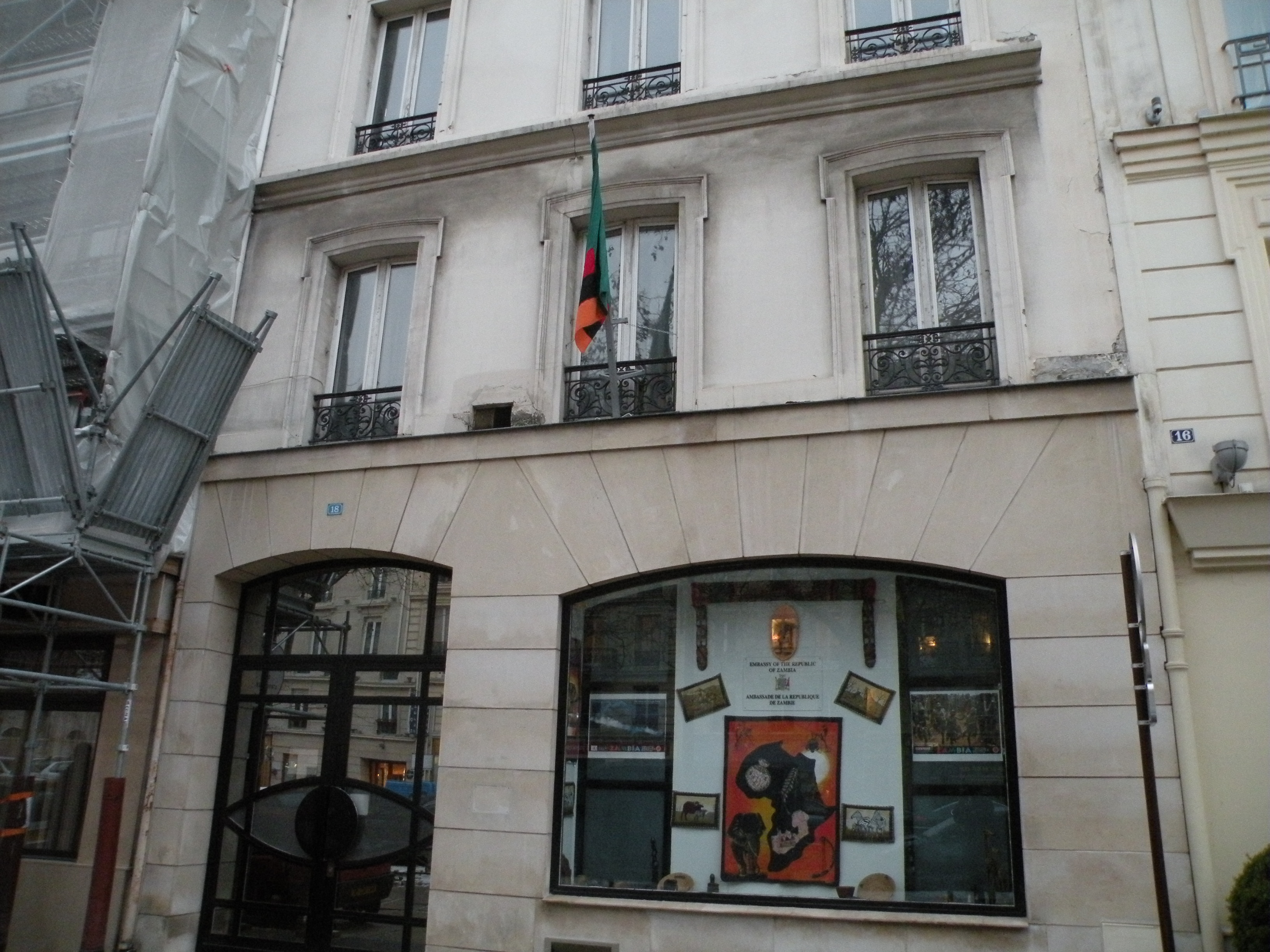
Embassy in Paris

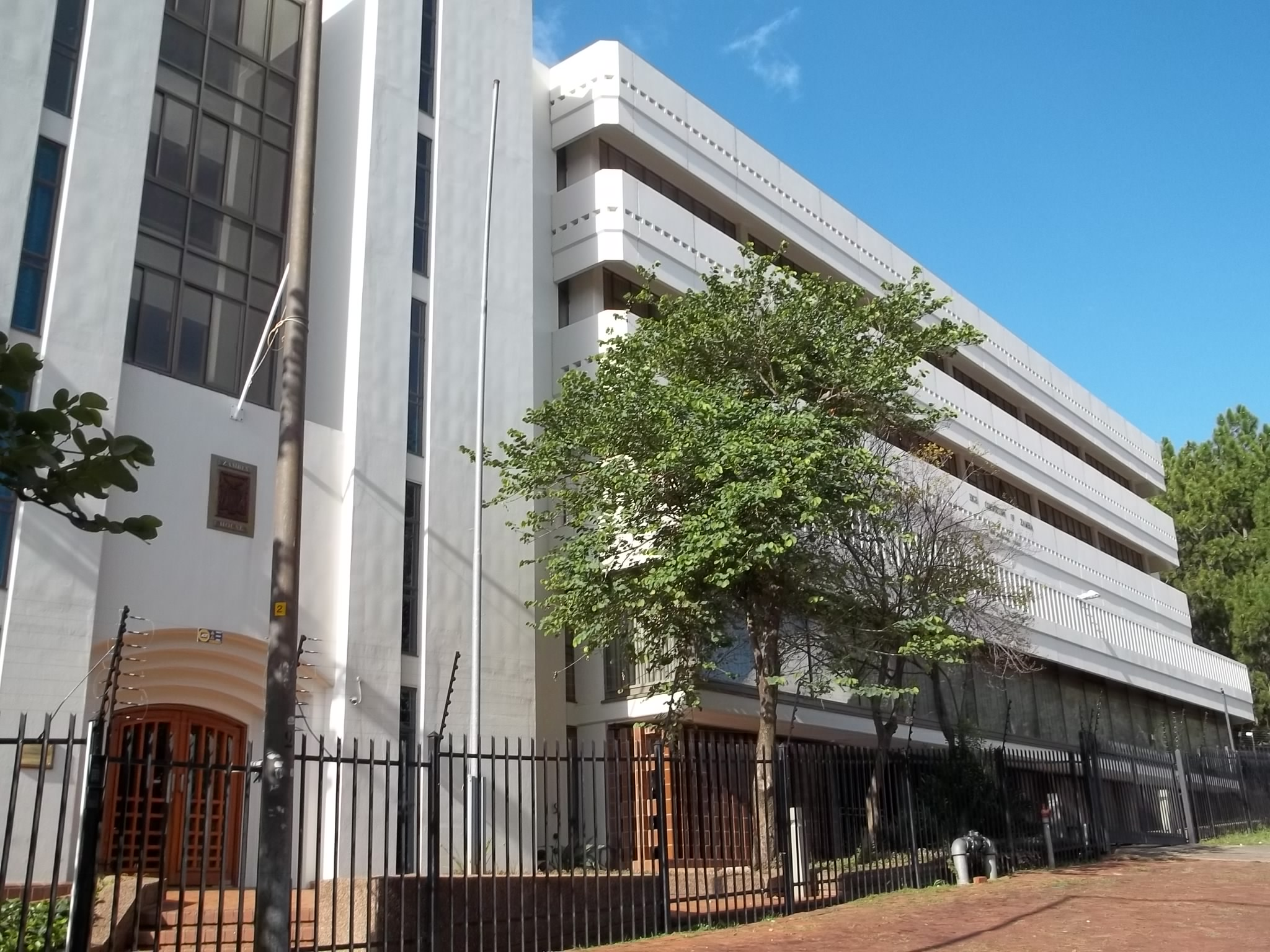
High Commission in Pretoria

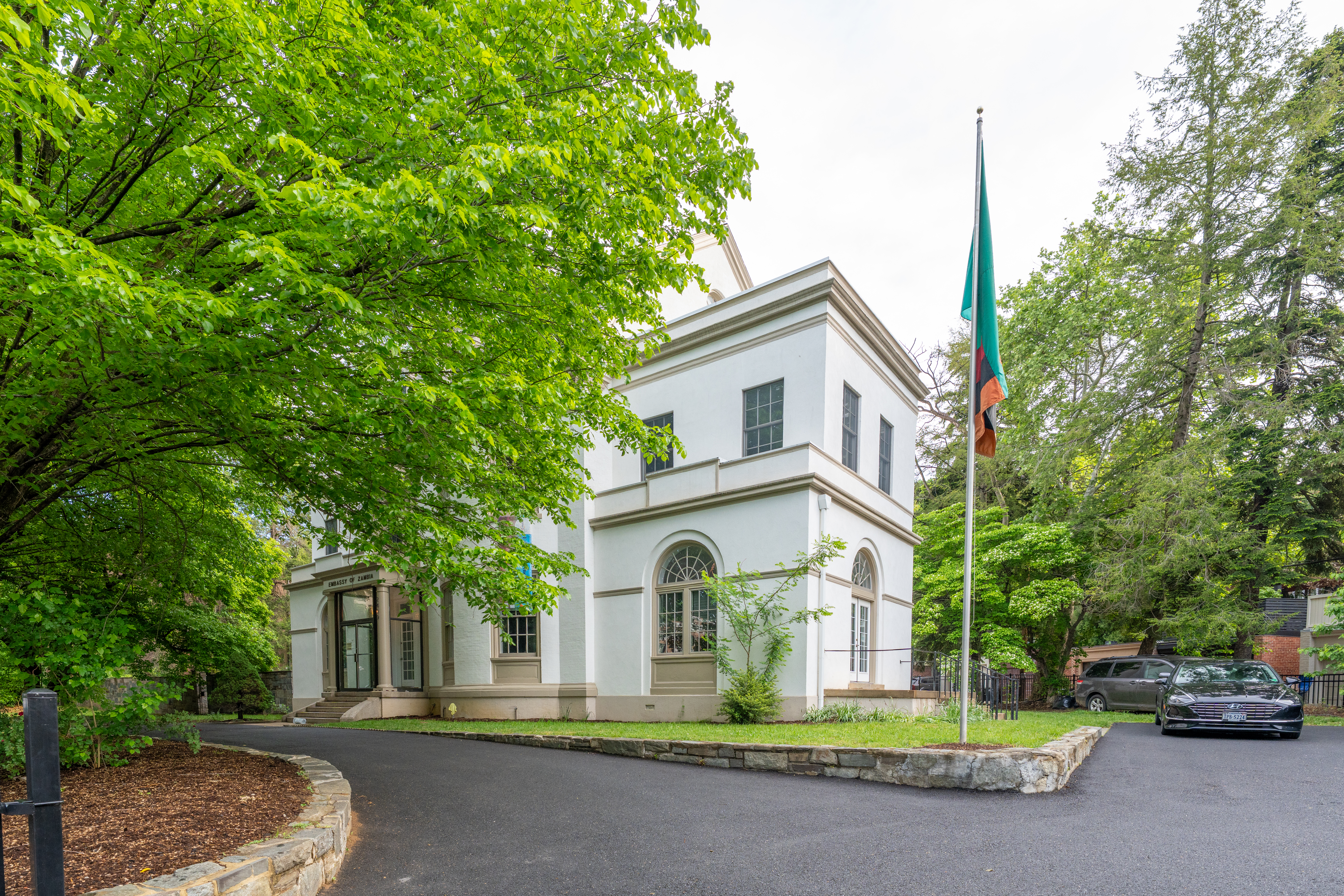
Embassy in Washington, D.C.

== Closed missions ==
=== Americas ===
Host country	Host city	Mission	Year closed	Ref.
Chile	Santiago de Chile	Embassy (Note: Resident in Brasília, Distrito Federal, Brazil)	Unknown	

== See also ==
- Foreign relations of Zambia
- Bibliography of the history of Zambia § Foreign relations
- Visa policy of Zambia
