= Turkey–Zambia relations =

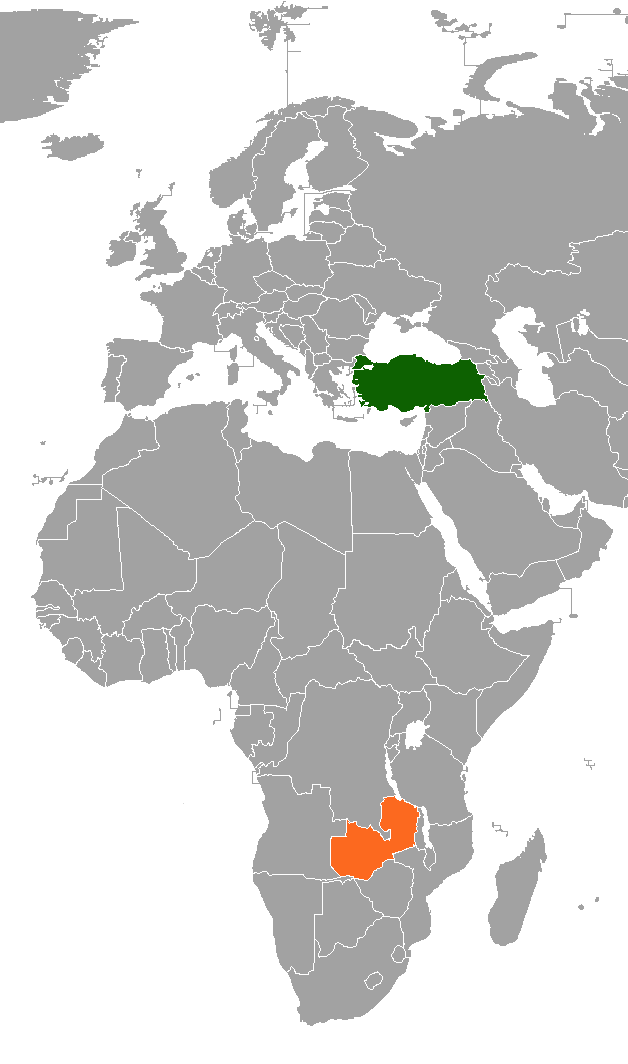
- Turkey: Zambia

Turkey's embassy in Lusaka opened in 2011 and the Zambian embassy in Ankara opened in 2013.

== Diplomatic relations ==
Turkey had excellent relations with Zambia under its founding president, Kenneth Kaunda. He was admired in Turkey for his opposition to colonialism and racism. As a Frontline State in the struggle for Rhodesia to achieve majority rule as Zimbabwe, Zambia cooperated with Turkey in opposing Apartheid in South Africa.

Because 95% of all Zambian imports and exports used Rhodesian railroads, when the British embargo against Rhodesian petroleum products caused Zambia’s economy to collapse. In 1966, Turkey, along with Canada, Great Britain, and the United States responded to Zambian shortage of petroleum products by airlifting fuel supplies until an oil pipeline between Tanzania and Zambia was completed in August 1968.

Following the election of Frederick Chiluba in Zambia, bilateral relations cooled because of the rampant corruption Frederick Chiluba engaged in. A British court on May 4, 2007 would go on to find him guilty of having stolen US$ 46 million.

== Presidential visits ==
Guest	Host	Place of visit	Date of visit
(Turkey) President Recep Tayyip Erdoğan	(Zambia) President Edgar Lungu	Lusaka	July 28, 2018
(Zambia) President Edgar Lungu	(Turkey) President Recep Tayyip Erdoğan	Presidential Complex, Ankara	July 8–10, 2018

== Economic relations ==
- Trade volume between the two countries was US$23.7 million in 2019 (Turkish exports/imports: 17.8/5.9 million USD).
- There are direct flights from Istanbul to Lusaka since December 14, 2018.

== See also ==
- Foreign relations of Turkey
- Foreign relations of Zambia
