= United Kingdom–Zambia relations =

- Zambia: United Kingdom

The United Kingdom and Zambia established diplomatic relations on 17 October 1964.

Both countries share common membership of the Commonwealth, the International Criminal Court, the United Nations, and the World Trade Organization. Bilaterally the two countries have a Development Partnership, a Double Taxation Agreement, an Energy Africa Partnership Agreement, a Green Growth Compact, and have signed an Investment Agreement.

== History ==
The UK governed Zambia from 1911 to 1964, when Zambia achieved full independence.

Zambia was part of the British Empire, when it was known as Northern Rhodesia, until its independence from the United Kingdom in 1964. Both countries are part of the Commonwealth of Nations.

Zambian ambassador Lieutenant General Paul Mihova is based at the High Commission of Zambia, London. Nicholas Woolley was appointed British High Commissioner to Zambia in August 2019. The Zambia Independence Act 1964 was passed, assuring Zambian Independence.

R (Tigere) v Secretary of State for Business, Innovation and Skills was decided by the Supreme Court of the United Kingdom.

== Diplomatic relations ==
- Zambia maintains a high commission in London.
- The United Kingdom is accredited to Zambia through its high commission in Lusaka.

== See also ==
- Foreign relations of the United Kingdom
- Foreign relations of Zambia
