= Water supply and sanitation in Zambia =

Data
- Water coverage (broad definition): (basic water service) 61% (2015)
- Sanitation coverage (broad definition): (basic sanitation) 31% (2015)
- Continuity of supply: Average of 16 hours per day in 2010
- Average urban water use (L/person/day): 77 (2010), ranging from 26 to 121 between utilities
- Average urban water and sanitation tariff (US$/m^{3}): US$5.80/month for metered users
- Share of household metering: 58% (2010), up from 39% (2006)
- Annual investment in WSS: US$33.5 million (2002) or US$3/capita/year
- Share of external financing: 2% government, 98% external donors (2002)

Institutions
- Decentralization to municipalities: Yes (11 municipality-owned regional commercial utilities)
- National water and sanitation company: None
- Water and sanitation regulator: Yes (NWASCO)
- Responsibility for policy setting: Minister for Local Government and Housing
- Sector law: Yes
- No. of urban service providers: 11 Commercial Utilities

Water supply and sanitation in Zambia is characterized by achievements and challenges. Among the achievements are the creation of regional commercial utilities for urban areas to replace fragmented service provision by local governments; the establishment of a regulatory agency that has substantially improved the availability of information on service provision in urban areas; the establishment of a devolution trust fund to focus donor support on poor peri-urban areas; and an increase in the access to water supply in rural areas.

Among the challenges are a low rate of cost recovery despite tariff increases in urban areas; limited capacity in the sector; insufficient progress in increasing access to sanitation; a high level of non-revenue water (44% as of 2010) in urban areas; a high rate of non-functioning rural water systems; and insufficient investment levels despite substantial foreign aid.

== Access ==
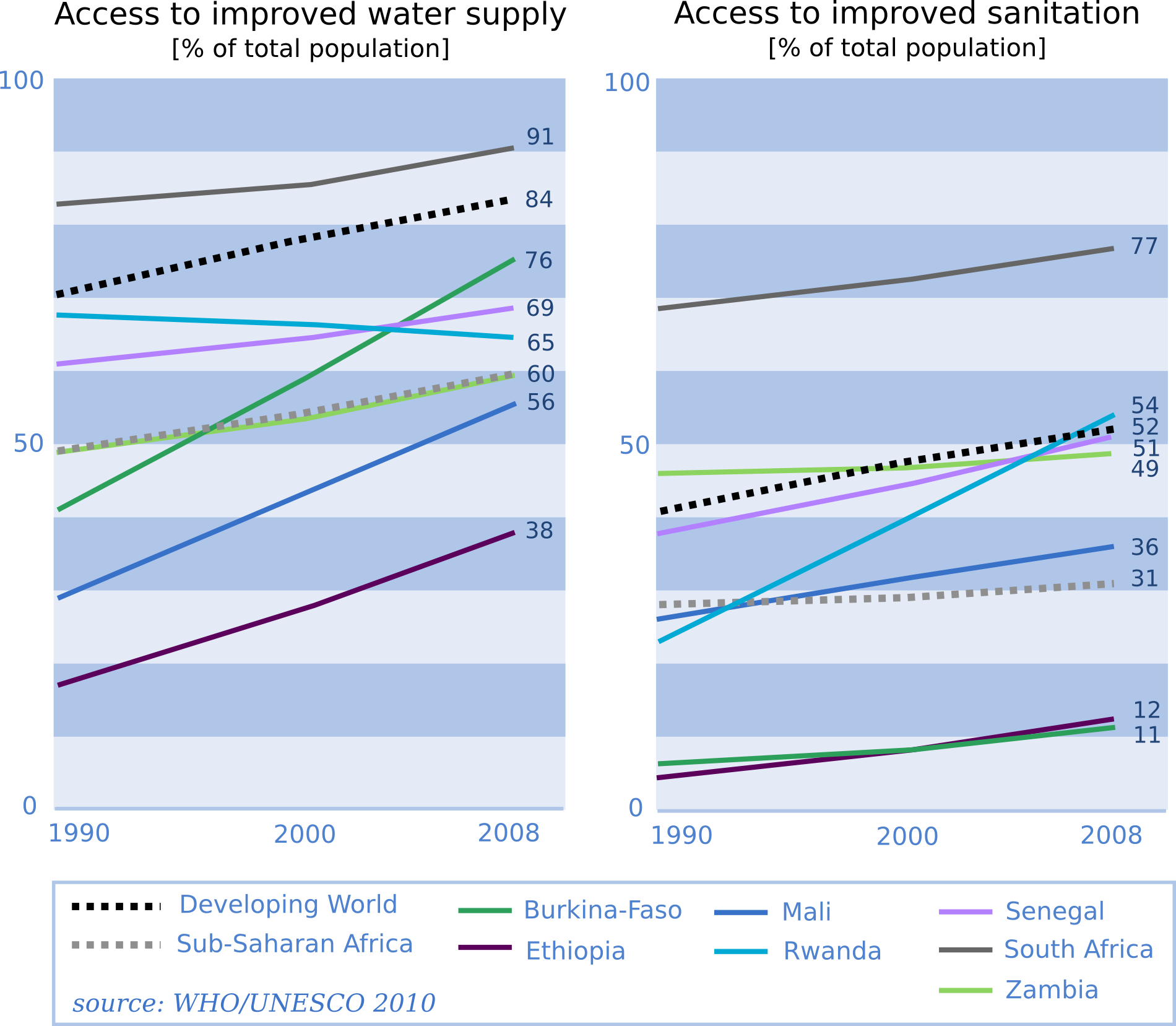
Access to improved water supply and sanitation, in 7 Sub-Saharan countries, from 1990 until 2008.

In 2015, 61% of the total population had access to an "at least basic water service", or 86% of the urban population and 44% of the rural population. However, around 6 million people in Zambia still lack access to "at least basic water". As for sanitation, in 2015, 31% of the total population had access to "at least basic sanitation" service. 49% of the urban population had access to basic sanitation and 19% of the rural population. There are still around 11 million people who lack access to at least basic sanitation. Moreover, in 2015, 15% of the population in Zambia, defecated in the open.

In earlier years (2010), the figures were as follows: 61% of the population of Zambia had access to an improved source of water supply and 48% had access to adequate sanitation, according to UN data calculated on the basis of national surveys, including most recently the Demographic and Health Survey of 2007. Concerning water supply, there is a stark contrast between urban areas (87% access according to the UN, 78% access according to the regulator in 2010) and rural areas (46% access according to the UN).

For sanitation, access rates in 2010 were only slightly higher for urban areas (57% according to national surveys, 54% according to the regulator in 2010) and rural areas (43% according to the UN). In urban areas, 41% have access to water connections in their house or yard and 49% rely on water kiosks and standpipes. The share of those with access to house connections has actually declined, while the share of those served by kiosks has increased. According to National Water and Sanitation Council director Kelvin Chitumbo, Zambia has achieved the Millennium Development Goal for drinking water, but is off track to reach the goal for sanitation.

Water kiosks, which were first introduced in Zambia in 2005, are operated by private individuals who have signed an agreement with water utilities and municipalities. The kiosk operators buy piped water in bulk and sell it at a slightly higher regulated price of about 1 US Cent per 20 litres to users who carry the water in jerry cans to their homes. The kiosk operators supplement their income by selling various other items of daily life. There were about 170 water kiosks in Zambia in 2008, providing water to 200,000 people. Another 100 kiosks were expected to be added in 2009.

Concerning sanitation, 29% of the urban population are connected to sewers and 30% are served by septic tanks or improved household-level latrines. While these figures are low, they are actually higher than the average access in Sub-Saharan Africa.

Lack of access to water and sanitation has significant negative social impacts, in particular on girls and women who are often in charge of collecting water for their villages and homes – sometimes walking extremely long distances to do so. After that girls are too tired to come back home and concentrate on education.

== Service quality ==
=== Drinking water quality ===
According to the regulatory agency, 94% of water samples collected in urban areas were in compliance with drinking water standards in 2010. Pollution from mines affects drinking water supply quality provided by the Mulonga and Nkana water and sewerage companies, where in some cases, the concentration of manganese was beyond treatable limits.

=== Continuity ===
Water supply in urban areas is intermittent, with an average supply of 16 hours per day in 2010. The highest intermittency has been measured in the small Luapula Utility with 6 hours per day. The only utility providing continuous supply in 2007 was in Chipata, while in 2010, the only utility that provided near continuous supply was the Northwestern Water and Sewerage Company.

=== Wastewater treatment ===
Wastewater treatment plants regularly do not achieve effluent standards. Capacities of plants like the Manchinchi in Lusaka and the Kanini in Ndola have been out-grown by the population. Stabilization ponds such as in Kaunda Square in Lusaka and Livingstone City are in a deplorable state and pose a serious environmental hazard. However, a number of projects have been initiated to ensure an improvement in wastewater treatment. For instance in 2018, the Kaunda Square stabilization ponds in Lusaka where rehabilitated under the Lusaka Water Supply, Sanitation, and Drainage Project (LWSSD). In addition, a 5-year Lusaka Sanitation Programme funded by EIB, KfW, AfDB, WB and the Government of Zambia was initiated. The project scope involved construction of new wastewater treatment plants, 520 km of sewers, decentralised wastewater treatment systems, 100 public toilets, about 12,000 on-site sanitation units and faecal sludge treatment Plants.

== Water resources ==
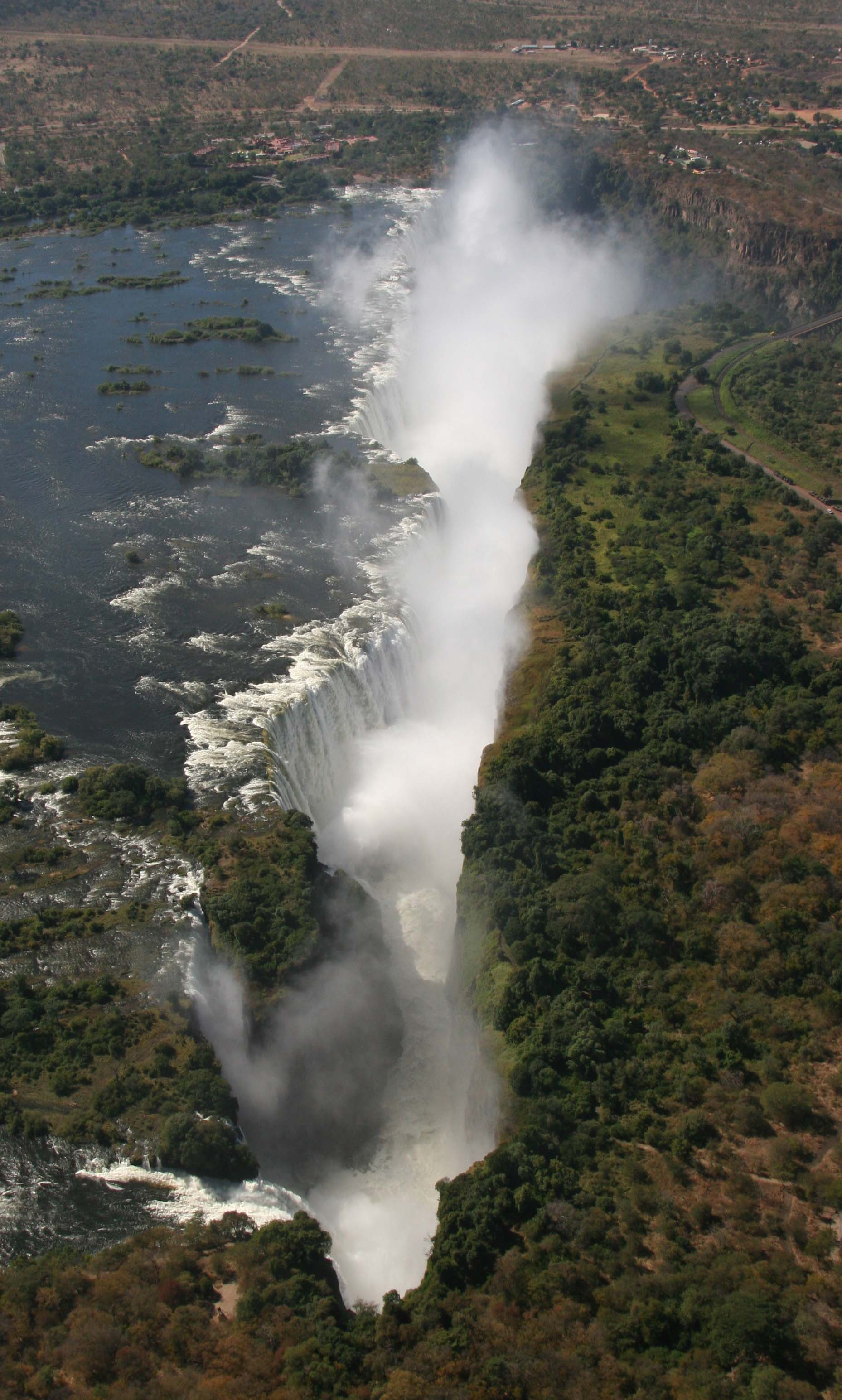
The Zambezi River, shown here at the Victoria Falls, is rich in water. However, most Zambians live too far from the river to benefit from it, so that water is often scarce during the dry season.

Unlike many other countries in the region Zambia has more than adequate water resources, although during the dry season water resources may be scarce, especially in the southern part of the country. The annual rainfall averages between 1400 mm in the north and gradually declines to 700 mm in the south. The country is rich in rivers, such as the transboundary Zambezi and lakes Tanganyika, Mweru and Kariba. It is estimated that only 1.5% of the annual renewable water resources are being used at present. There are significant regional differences across the country with regard to place and time when water is available. Also groundwater availability is unevenly distributed.

== Responsibility for water supply and sanitation ==
Responsibilities in the sector are clearly separated between the Ministry of Local Government and Housing (policy), National Water Supply and Sanitation Council (economic regulation) and local government as well as commercial utilities owned by local government (service provision in urban areas).

=== Policy ===
The Ministry of Local Government and Housing is in charge of sector policies. Within the Ministry the Department of Housing and infrastructure development (DHID) is responsible for water supply and sanitation infrastructure planning and resource mobilization. The DHID has established a specific Rural Water Supply and Sanitation Unit (RWSSU) in 2003 and shortly thereafter also a unit for peri-urban water supply and sanitation.

According to the 1994 National Water Policy seven principles govern the state's policy in water and sanitation

- Separation of water resources management from water supply and sanitation
- Separation of regulatory and executive functions
- Devolution of authority to local authorities and private enterprises
- Achievement of full cost recovery for the water supply and sanitation services in the longrun
- Human resources development leading to more effective institutions.
- The use of technologies more appropriate to local conditions
- Increased budget spending to the sector

By 2008 at least the first three principles had been put into practice. However, full cost recovery was far from being achieved and budget spending remained far below what is needed to achieve the Millennium Development Goals for the sector.

In 2010 the national water policy was revised in order to take into account "current international developments", to integrate cross-cutting issues such as gender, HIV/AIDS and climate change, and to introduce modern principles of water resources management.

=== Regulation and training ===
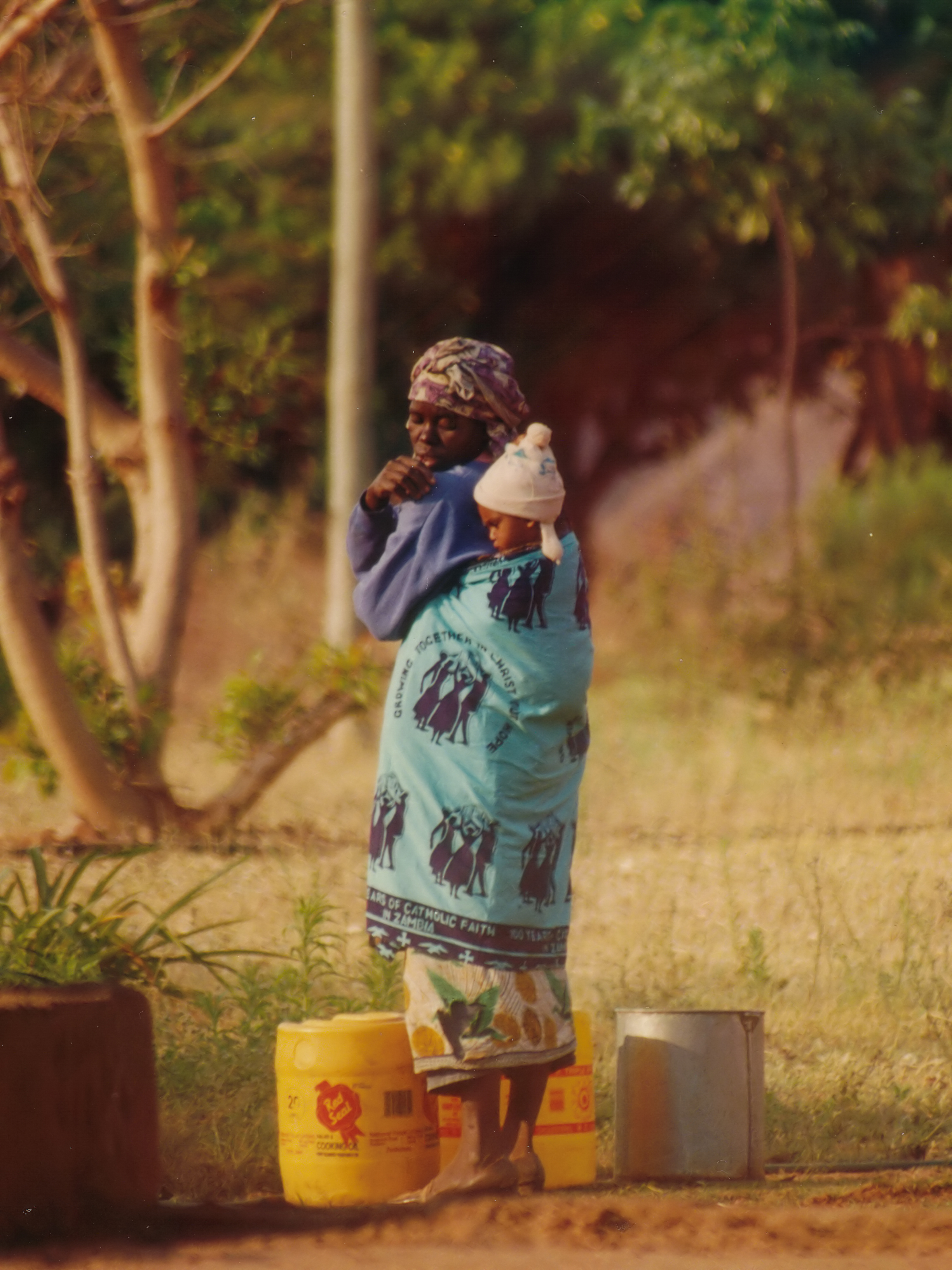
A woman carrying water in Chipata.

Economic regulation of water supply and sanitation services is the task of the National Water Supply and Sanitation Council (NWASCO). It oversees tariff adjustments, minimum service levels, financial projection and investment planning and corporate governance. NWASCO has made "significant progress in benchmarking, reporting and engaging users" despite being "underfunded and understaffed". However, its effectiveness remains limited, among others because "the mechanisms for enforcing regulatory rules remain unclear".

NWASCO's is supported by water watch groups and part-time inspectors who monitor the quality of service on the ground. Water watch groups exist in 10 cities. They consist of volunteers who educate users about their rights and obligations, and assist users to resolve complaints. This has apparently reduced petty corruption and meter manipulation. According to research, while it is common in Zambia to pay bribes for a connection to the electricity grid, this type of bribe is almost absent for water connections. In 2010 the regulator dissolved water watch groups in Chingola, Kabwe and Lusaka "for non-performance", but all three were re-established a few months later.

According to the German Technical Cooperation, NWASCO is so successful that it "can serve as a role model for other countries in the region". NWASCO reports to the Ministry of Energy and Water Development, not to the Ministry of Local Government and Housing that is in charge of sector policy.

The Water and Sanitation Association of Zambia (WASAZA), created in 1999, provides training, promotes the exchange of experiences on good practices and aims at increasing public awareness. It has more than 300 corporate and individual members.

=== Service provision ===
There are three forms of service provision in urban areas in Zambia: Commercial Utilities, Local Authorities and Private Schemes. In 2011 there were eleven commercial utilities, each covering between 3 and 17 municipalities. They are owned by the local authorities and provide water services to more than 86% of the urban population with access to improved water supply. The size of the utilities ranges from 3,000 to more than 75,000 connections.

The capacity of the utilities differs considerably. In 2010 the Southern utility with its seat in Choma was ranked first and the Chambeshi utility in the Northeast was ranked last. The utilities have formed the Commercial Utility Association of Zambia (CUZA). A few local authorities still run their own water supply system, but they consider creating their own regional commercial utilities or to join existing ones. The 6 private schemes that are run by commercial entities whose core business is not water supply that supply water to their employees for free. These include the Konkola Copper Mines, the Nakambala Sugar Estate and the Chilanga Cement Factory, among others.

In rural areas district councils are in charge of water supply with the assistance of provincial support teams.

== History and recent developments ==
=== Infrastructure boom (1964–1973) ===
Much of Zambia's drinking water infrastructure was built between independence in 1964 and the mid-1970s at a time when economic growth was strong and export earnings from copper mining were high. Water was provided for free and little attention was given to the sustainability of services. Water supply was the responsibility of local authorities, with the exception of the mining belt where the state-owned copper company operated water systems for the settlements housing their employees. Following the example of other countries in the region during the 1970s and 1980s, such as neighboring Congo, Zambia considered the establishment of a National Water Authority with responsibility for water supply, sanitation and water resources management. However, those who preferred decentralized service provision prevailed and the proposal was shelved. There was no national strategy for the sector, and the responsibility for the sector was fragmented among several Ministries. Meanwhile, the infrastructure deteriorated: Handpumps in rural areas broken down, and urban systems provided water without disinfection on an intermittent basis. The few who had access to continuous water supply received it for free and wasted it, with consumption levels of 200 liter per capita per day, higher than in most European cities. There were 35 sewer systems in the country, but only nine had functioning wastewater treatment plants.

=== Establishment of Commercial Utilities and a Regulator (1988–2000) ===
The foundation for reforms was initially laid at the local level when the city of Lusaka created the country's first Commercial Utility (CU) in 1989. The utility charged water tariffs and was a legally and financially autonomous public entity to be operated based on commercial principles. A year earlier, a first study laying out options for the future institutional structure of the sector had been undertaken. But the reform process only gathered steam in 1991 when the first democratic multi-party elections were held. The government of Frederick Chiluba (1991–2002) initiated liberal economic reforms. At this time the current sector structure, consisting of regional commercial utilities and a national regulatory agency, gradually evolved. A Process of "tariff rationalization" began and significant tariff increases were implemented between 1992 and 1994, albeit starting from an extremely low level. In 1992 the second commercial utility was established in Chipata. In 1994 the new National Water Policy (see above) was approved by Cabinet and in 1997 the Water Supply and Sanitation Act was passed. It created the regulatory agency (NWASCO) and a Devolution Trust Fund (DTF) as a financing vehicle for low-income, peri-urban areas. In 2000 NWASCO became operational. Tariffs were once again increased substantially, and six new commercial utilities were created. Unlike the first two utilities, the new utilities were regional utilities grouping together the physical assets and personnel of several local authorities, usually in a single province. At that time a few local authorities had begun to make money from selling water, while neglecting the maintenance of the infrastructure. They were initially reluctant to lose this source of income, because in a commercial utility all revenues were to be used to maintain the assets, to improve service quality and extend access. Also, the tariff level within a commercial utility would be the same, which meant that in some localities tariffs would have to increase.

=== Introduction of water kiosks (2004 onwards) ===
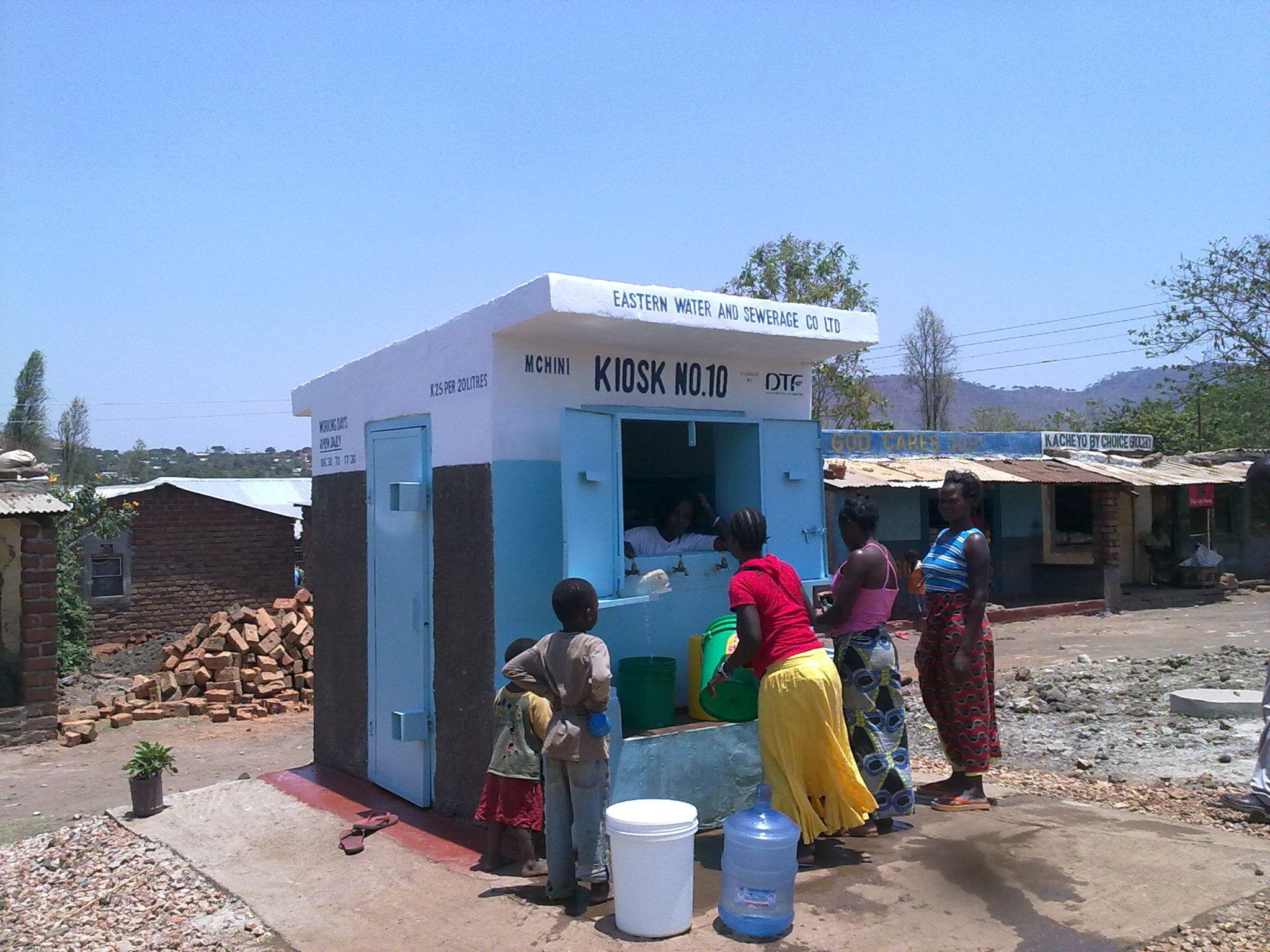
Water kiosks in Chipata.

When Levy Mwanawasa was elected president in 2002, the sector policies shaped under his predecessor basically remained in place. In 2004 the DTF became operational and two pilot projects in peri-urban areas were initiated in the Itimpi area in Kitwe and the Maiteneke area in Chingola with a total of 11 kiosks supplying 16,000 people. Both areas already had a piped water infrastructure. But it was so deteriorated that it provided no more water at all or so infrequently, so that the residents had reverted to the use of water from other sources including contaminated rivers. Some of those who received piped water got it through illegal connections. Those who had a legal the connection and got water did not pay for it. Water was resold from unmetered connections to neighbors. The commercial utilities paid to operate the system, but did not get any revenues. They were ready to give up the piped water systems in the peri-urban areas, and the residents had given up the hope that the authorities would provide proper piped services. There were also a few standpipes in the areas that provided water for free, but not on a regular basis. At the water kiosks the utility sold water in bulk to private operators who resold the water in buckets at a small profit. Under that system all bills to the utility were paid, while before 75% of bills were not paid. Illegal connections disappeared and leakage was reduced, because the length of the pipes was reduced. The pilots were considered successful by the utilities and the residents, and the system was thus scaled up to other areas and cities nationwide.

=== Privatization and its aftermath in the Copper Belt (2001–2008) ===
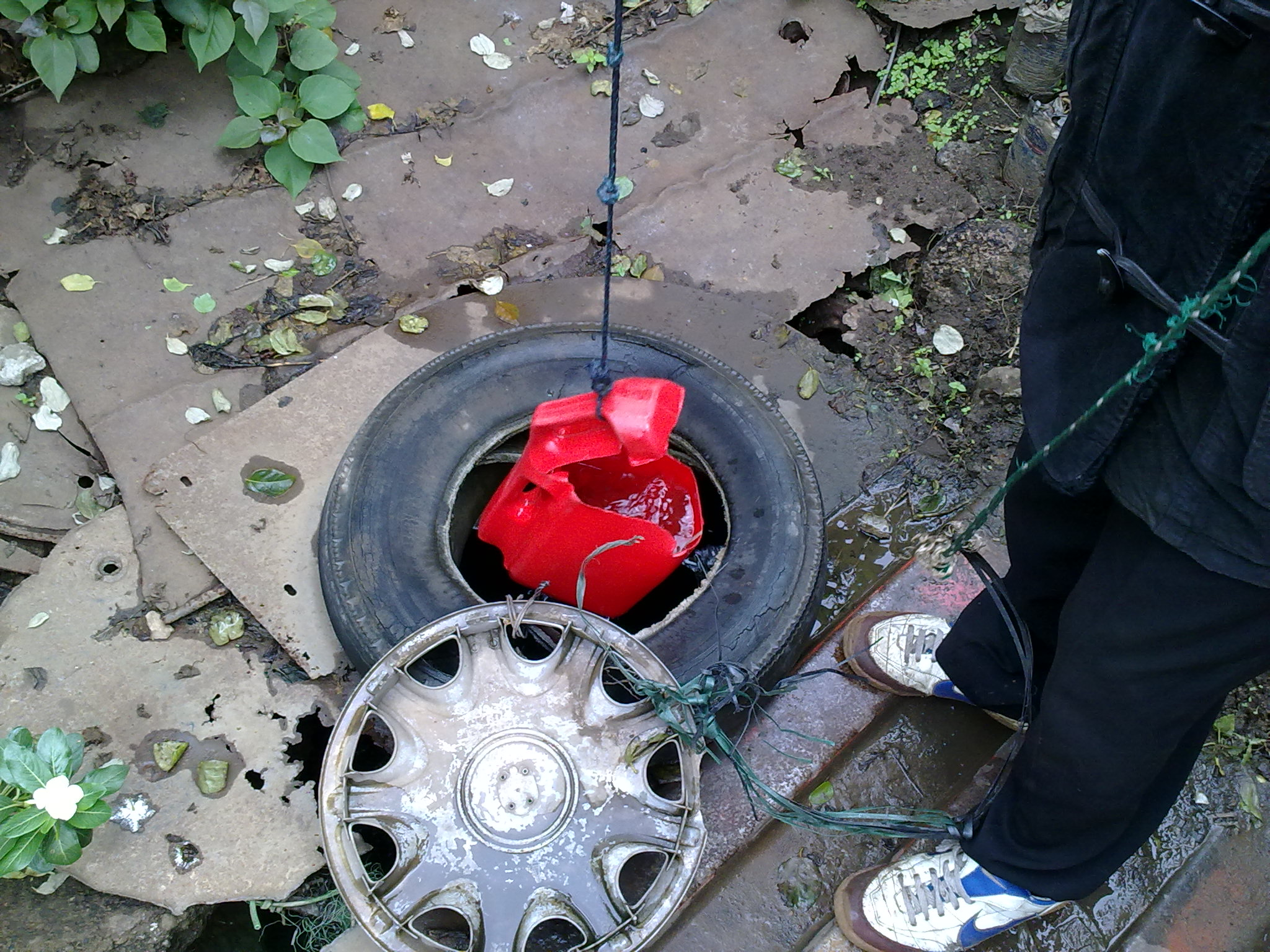
During incidents of water contamination, people sometimes revert to the use of shallow wells such as this one.

In 2001, after the privatization of the state-owned mining company ZCCM, the responsibility for water supply and sanitation in the mining towns was entrusted to the private French water company SAUR under a management contract supported by the World Bank. However, this remained the only case of private sector participation in the Zambian water sector. A World Bank-supported study by Severn Trent conducted in 2002 recommended that a lease contract should be signed for Lusaka, but the government did not accept the recommendation.

In 2005 the management contract in the copper mining area was terminated on the grounds that the privatized management did not perform better than publicly owned utilities. After a transition period of three years, service provision was entrusted to the three commercial utilities in the area. However, contamination of drinking water in the copper areas makes headlines. A similar contamination incident occurs in Chingola in 2006. During a second incident in January 2008, at least 13 people in Mufulira in northern Zambia were admitted to hospital after drinking water alleged to have been contaminated by the nearby Mopani Copper Mines. Residents were afraid to drink tap water and collected water from shallow wells or nearby streams.

=== Recent developments (2010 onwards) ===
In 2010 the National Water Policy was revised, but it maintained the same basic thrust concerning water supply and sanitation. In 2011 Parliament passed a new water resources management law. In September 2011 Michel Stata became president, who continued to pursue the established policies in the water sector.

== Financial aspects and efficiency ==
=== Tariffs and cost recovery ===
Tariff structure. Urban tariffs for unmetered domestic users are set according to the category of housing (low, medium and high costs) for purposes of cross-subsidization. For metered users an increasing-block tariff is applied. The regulator NWASCO is financed through a 1-2% surcharge on water tariffs.

Tariff increases and approval procedures. Tariffs were increased substantially between 1992 and 2006, between twofold and eightfold in real terms. The highest increase (+881% in these 14 years) was for the highest tranche for metered consumption in Lusaka, while the lowest increase (+61%) was for unmetered mid-cost housing in the Southern Province. The average collection efficiency in 2010 was 84%, indicating that 16% of users did not pay their bills.

Tariff increases have to be approved by NWASCO based on tariff adjustment guidelines published, in their second and improved version, in 2005. Proposals for tariff increases can be submitted in advance for a period of up to six years. The approval process includes ten steps, including a public hearing with consumer representatives and an analysis of service quality and costs. The regulator can exclude costs from the proposal if it considers them unjustified, but otherwise the regulator mostly has to follow specific calculations that are specified in the guidelines. On the one hand, if the utility has not met previously agreed targets for the share of metered customers, water quality and service continuity the approved tariff will be lower than if the targets are met. On the other hand, if special efforts have been made to improve access, performance or efficiency, higher tariffs will be approved. Sanitation tariffs are usually 30 percent of water tariffs. In contrast to the detailed procedures for the approval of water tariffs, sanitation tariffs are set as a share of water tariffs without taking into account the performance of the sanitation services.

Cost recovery. Financial viability in the urban areas has improved with six of the nine licensed commercial utilities operating in Zambia reaching operational cost coverage by the end of 2006. In 2010 the average operational cost recovery was 105%, varying from 46% to 130% in Mulonga. According to one study, higher levels of cost recovery are impeded by a high level of non-revenue water (44% in 2010) and low collection efficiency due to a large extent to the non-payment of water bills by public institutions. Cost recovery is almost nonexistent in rural areas where most communities do not pay anything.

Affordability. The share of household expenditures for water among the poor varied from 2.5% to 9.9% in 2002–03. More than 60% of poor households paid more than 3% of their expenditures on water.

=== Investments and financing ===
Actual investment. In 2002 total investments in water and sanitation were estimated at US$33.5 million, including US$33 million by donors and NGOs (98%) and US$0.5 million (2%) by the government using its own resources. Government capital expenditures had been budgeted at US$6.1 million for 2002, but only 9% of that amount was actually invested.

Investment needs. The Water Supply and Sanitation Development Group prepared a medium-term development strategy to implement during 1994–2003. Their estimations suggested that the government had to invest between US$407 million (under a low-cost investment strategy) and US$1,553 million (under medium-cost investment strategy) every year during this period in order to rehabilitate the existing system and expand the network to avoid any reduction in access rates, i.e. without increasing access rates. Actual investments were only a small fraction (8% of the low-cost scenario) of investment needs. The investments required for rural areas were estimated at US$260 million in the National Rural Water Supply and Sanitation Programme (2006–2015).

Financing. As pointed out above, 98% of investments in the sector are financed by donors and NGOs. The government has established a Devolution Trust Fund (DTF) to provide financing to increase access in poor urban areas through the use of low-cost technologies. The DTF financed water kiosks that provided access to clean water to 120,000 people at a cost of 643,455 Euro until 2006. The DTF assigns its funds based on proposals received from water utilities.

=== Efficiency ===
The average level of non-revenue water in the commercial utilities operating in urban areas was estimated at 44% in 2010, varying among utilities between 34% for the Northwest and 67% in Luapula.

Staff per 1,000 connections varies between 7 and 17, thus indicating significant overstaffing, since national targets are less than 5 or 9 staff per 1,000 connections depending on the size of the utility. Utility performance has constantly increased since NWASCO began its benchmarking exercise.

== External cooperation ==
A large array of external public donors support the water and sanitation sector in Zambia. Donors coordinate their activities on the basis of a Joint Assistance Strategy covering all sectors and a Sector Advisory Group for the water sector. One donor has the function of speaker of the sector advisory group on a yearly rotating basis. There are also coordination groups for the three sub-sectors urban water supply and sanitation, rural water supply and sanitation as well as water resources management.

Donors increasingly use basket funding, based on a basket for rural water supply and sanitation and a second basket for urban water supply and sanitation. Many NGOs, such as CARE and WaterAid, also support the sector.

The activities of the main public donors are listed below in alphabetical order.

=== African Development Bank ===
In the Central Province the African Development Bank has been supporting the seven local authorities in institutional reforms and infrastructure rehabilitation under a project approved in 2003. In Nkana it supports water supply and sanitation under a project approved in 2008. Furthermore, a national rural water supply and sanitation program has been approved in 2006.

=== Denmark ===
Since 2004 DANIDA supports the Mulonga, Kafubu and Western Water and Sewerage companies. In 2006 it approved a EUR 32.8 million five–year (2006–2010) Water Sector Support Program, which includes water supply and sanitation in rural and peri-urban areas, as well as integrated water resources management. Denmark will end its support for the Zambian water sector in 2013.

=== European Union ===
Both the European Commission, which provides grants, and the European Investment Bank, which provides loans, are active in the sector. In 2012, a US$75 million loan from the EIB to the three commercial utilities in the Copperbelt was under appraisal.

=== Germany ===
Germany supports the water and sanitation sector in Zambia through financial cooperation carried out by KfW Development Bank and German Technical Cooperation carried out by GIZ. German aid has been particularly involved in expanding services to the urban poor through water kiosks, supported via the Devolution Trust Fund (DTF). A more recent pilot project for the construction of latrines is also being supported by Germany through the DTF. GIZ has been active in strengthening the regulatory agency NWASCO, in setting up a sector information system, and in strengthening NWASCO's planning capabilities.

In the Eastern Province, which currently has only a single commercial utility in Chipata, the German government assists its partners in commercializing the service delivery in small towns outside of Chipata. Through the support of KfW 520 wells have been built or rehabilitated in eight Districts of the Eastern Provinces. Sanitation facilities have been built at schools and health posts, and measures to promote appropriate hygiene behavior have been supported. The Southern and North-Western commercial utilities have also benefited from German support. In all three commercial utilities training is carried out covering administration, institutional development, electrical engineering and water production/distribution.

Concerning rural water supply, German aid is engaged in the Northwestern Province. The Project is working with the Councils of Kasempa, Kabompo and Mufumbwe District to reach out to a population of about 2.5 million people beginning in 2004 through the construction of boreholes and hand-dug wells. The project emphasizes the participation of the population in the communities, especially of women. Health education including malaria and HIV/AIDS are also part of the project.

=== Ireland ===
Ireland supports the Chambeshi commercial utility.

=== Japan ===
JICA provides grants for investments in groundwater development in Luapula Province (2008–2010), technical cooperation for the sustainable operation and maintenance of rural water supply (2007–2010) and capacity building for commercial utilities (2007–2009).

=== UNICEF ===
UNICEF supports water supply projects in cooperation with the Maureen Mwanawasa Community Initiative, the wife of the late President Mwanawasa. UNICEF's activities in the Zambian water sector are supported by UKAid.

=== United States ===
The United States, through the Millennium Challenge Corporation, provides a $355 million grant for water supply and sanitation in Lusaka approved in March 2012. The US also supports water supply and sanitation in 800 rural schools through USAID.

=== World Bank ===
The World Bank assists the Lusaka Water and Sewerage Company (LWSC) with a US$23m Water Sector Performance Improvement Project approved in 2006. $22m will be used to support LWSC and $1m will support "institutional capacity building to prepare the Ministry of Local Government and Housing to advance a coordinated approach for the sector".

== See also ==
- Sanitation worker
- Water supply and sanitation in Sub-Saharan Africa
