= High Commission of Zambia, London =

High Commission of Zambia in London
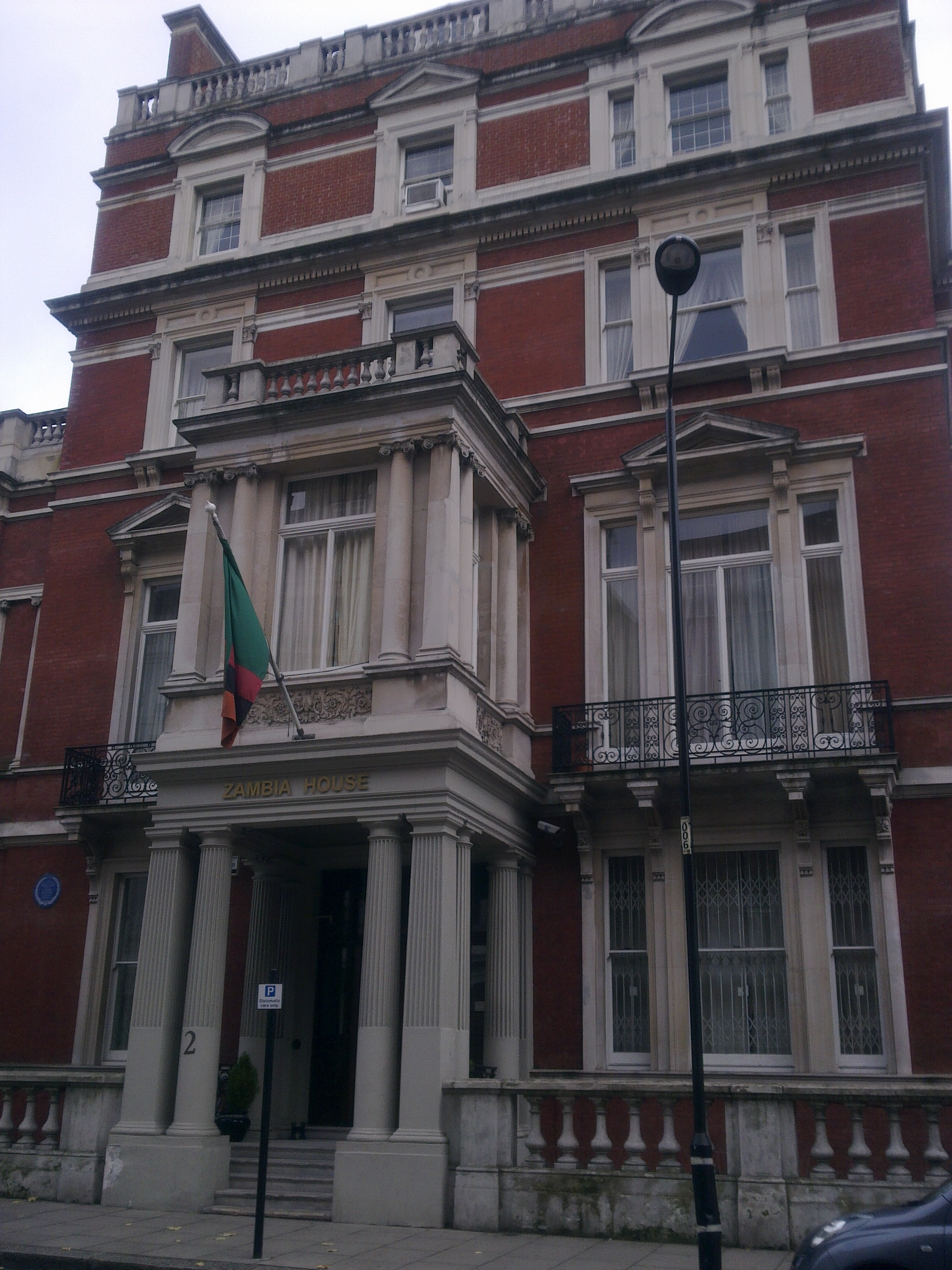
- Location: South Kensington, London
- Address: 2 Palace Gate, London, W8 5NG
- Coordinates: 51°30′2.7″N 0°11′2.1″W
- High Commissioner: Ms. Macenje Florence Mazoka

The High Commission of Zambia in London is the diplomatic mission of Zambia in the United Kingdom.

A plaque outside the High Commission commemorates the painter John Everett Millais who lived and died in the building.

== Gallery ==
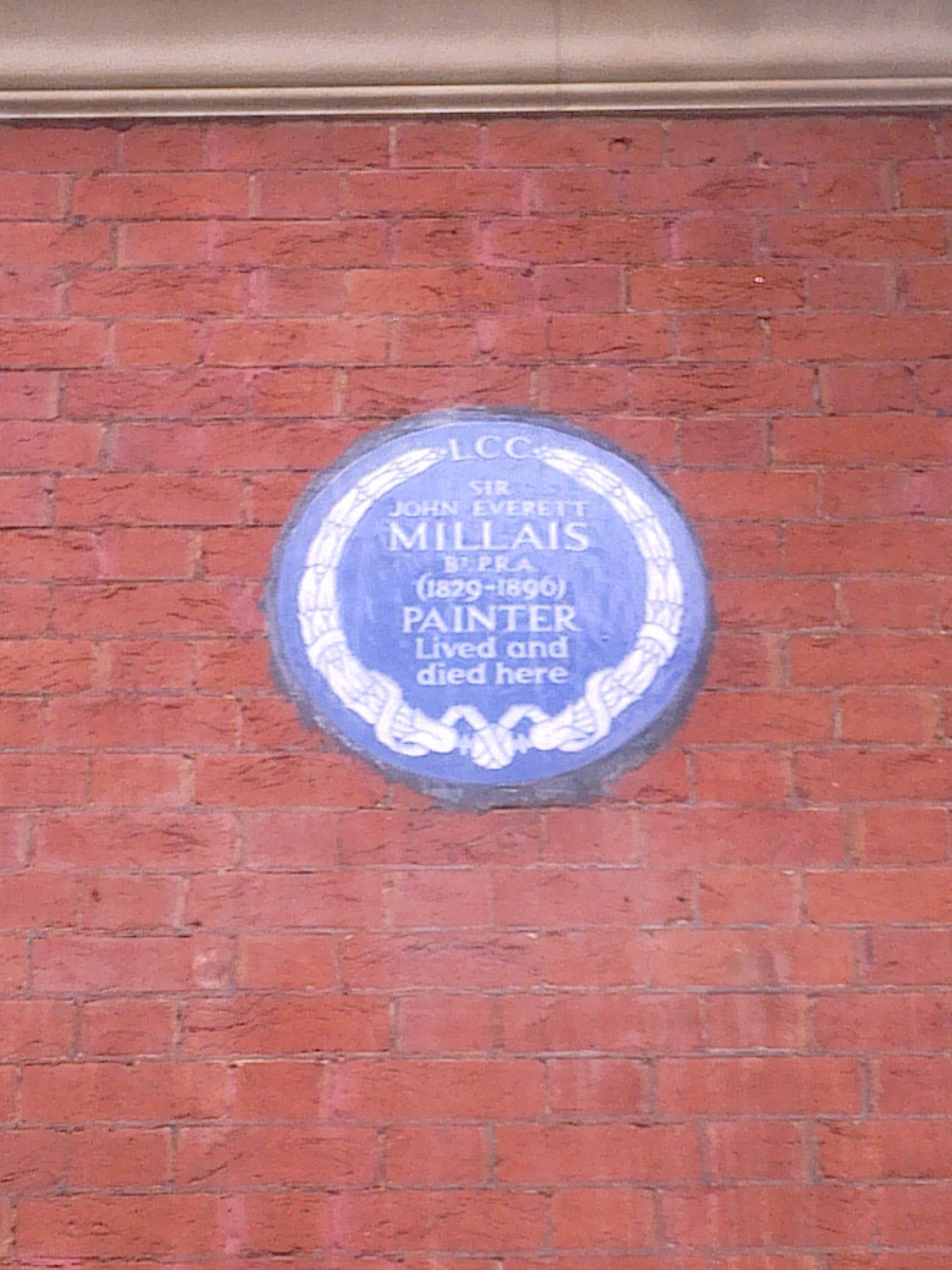
Plaque outside the embassy commemorating John Everett Millais

== See also ==
- United Kingdom–Zambia relations
