= Karenge Drinking Water Supply System =

Water supply system in Rwanda

- Location within Rwanda
- Interactive map of Karenge Drinking Water Supply System
- Location: Karenge, Lake Mugesera, Rwamagana District
- Coordinates: 02°13′08″S 30°27′50″E
- Estimated output: 15,000 cubic meters (15,000,000 L) of water daily
- Extended output: 48,000 cubic meters (48,000,000 L) of water daily
- Cost: US$163.4 million
- Technology: Filtration, Sedimentation, Chlorination
- Percent of water supply: Kigali City & Rwamagana District
- Operation date: 31 December 2024 (Expected)

Karenge Drinking Water Supply System (KDWSS), also Karenge Water Supply System is a water intake, purification, and distribution system in Rwanda. The system supplies water to parts of the capital city of Kigali and the neighboring Rwamagana District.

== Location ==
The water treatment and distribution facility is located in the lakeside community of Karenge, Rwamagana District, in the Eastern Province of Rwanda, on the shores of Lake Mugesera, approximately 50 kilometres (31 mi), by road, southeast of the city of Kigali, the national capital.

== Overview ==
KDWSS was established in 1975 with processing capacity of 3,840 cubic metres (135,608 cu ft) every day. In 1985, that capacity was increased to 7,200 cubic metres (254,266 cu ft) daily. In 2008, daily output was increased to 12,000 cubic metres (423,776 cu ft). As of October 2020, the system produced 15,000 cubic metres (529,720 cu ft) of drinkable water every day, of which 12,000 cubic metres (423,776 cu ft) (80 percent) was piped to Kigali and 3,000 cubic metres (105,944 cu ft) (20 percent) was distributed within Rwamagana District.

== Expansion ==
In 2020 the government of Rwanda, through its subsidiary, Water and Sanitation Corporation (WASAC Limited), resolved to increase the processing capacity of this plant to 48,000 cubic metres (1,695,104 cu ft) daily. The expansion involves:

- Upgrading the raw water source
- Construction of new raw water intake pumps
- Upgrading the raw water intake pipes
- Relocating the intake pumping station
- Improving the capacity of the motors and pumps
- Construction of new drinking water storage tanks
- Expanding the drinking water transport and distribution network by laying 33 kilometres (21 mi) of new distribution pipes.

== Construction and funding ==
The cost of expansion is budgeted at $164.3 million. Construction financing is provided by the entities listed below:

Karenge Water System Expansion Funding
Rank	Development Partner	Contribution in USD	Percentage	Notes
1	OPEC Fund for International Development (OFID)	21.0 million	12.8	Loan
2	Abu Dhabi Fund for Development (ADFD)			Loan
3	Saudi Fund for Development (SFD)			Loan
4	Arab Bank for Economic Development in Africa (BADEA)			Loan
5	Exim Bank of Hungary	52.0	31.6	Loan
	Total	164.3 million	100.00	

== Other considerations ==
The expanded plant is part of the plans by the Rwandan authorities to have 100 percent universal potable water supply by December 2024.

== See also ==
- Water supply and sanitation in Rwanda
- Katosi Water Works
- Water supply and sanitation in Sub-Saharan Africa
