= Water supply and sanitation in sub-Saharan Africa =

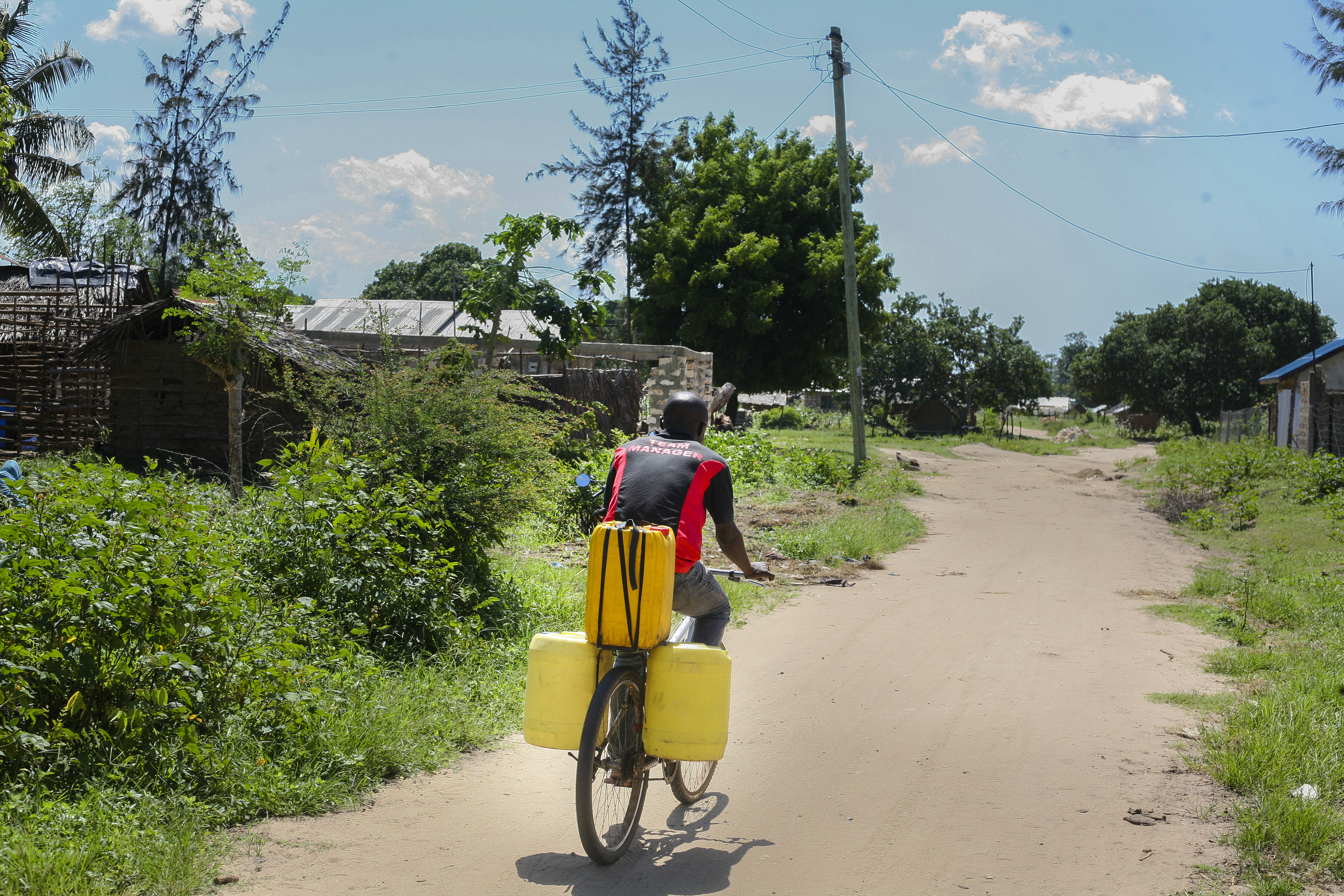
In many countries in Africa, jerry cans, which are used to transport and store water, are a good option for safe storage.

Access to water supply and sanitation in Sub-Saharan Africa has increased over the past two decades. However, compared with other developing regions, coverage levels in much of the region remain relatively low. Progress has been uneven between countries and between urban and rural areas, and many communities continue to face limited access to safe drinking water and improved sanitation services. Access to improved water supply had increased from 49% in 1990 to 68% in 2015, while access to improved sanitation had only risen from 28% to 31% in that same period. Sub-Saharan Africa did not meet the Millennium Development Goals (MDGs, 1990–2015) of halving the share of the population without access to safe drinking water and sanitation between 1990 and 2015. There still exists large disparities among sub-Saharan African countries, and between the urban and rural areas.

Usually, water is provided by utilities in urban areas and municipalities or community groups in rural areas. Sewerage networks are not common and wastewater treatment is even less common. Sanitation is often in the form of individual pit latrines or shared toilets. 70% of investments in water supply and sanitation in sub-Saharan Africa are financed internally and only 30% is financed externally (2001–2005 average). Most of the internal financing is household self-finance ($2.1bn), which is primarily for on-site sanitation such as latrines. Public sector financing ($1.2bn) is almost as high as external financing (US$1.4bn). The contribution of private commercial financing has been negligible at $10 million only.

== Water resources ==
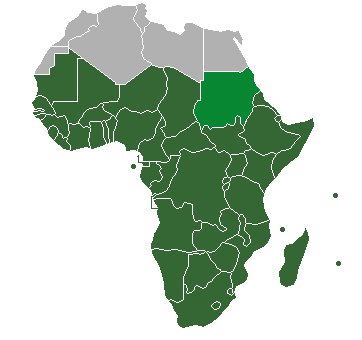
A map of sub-saharan Africa

=== Groundwater ===
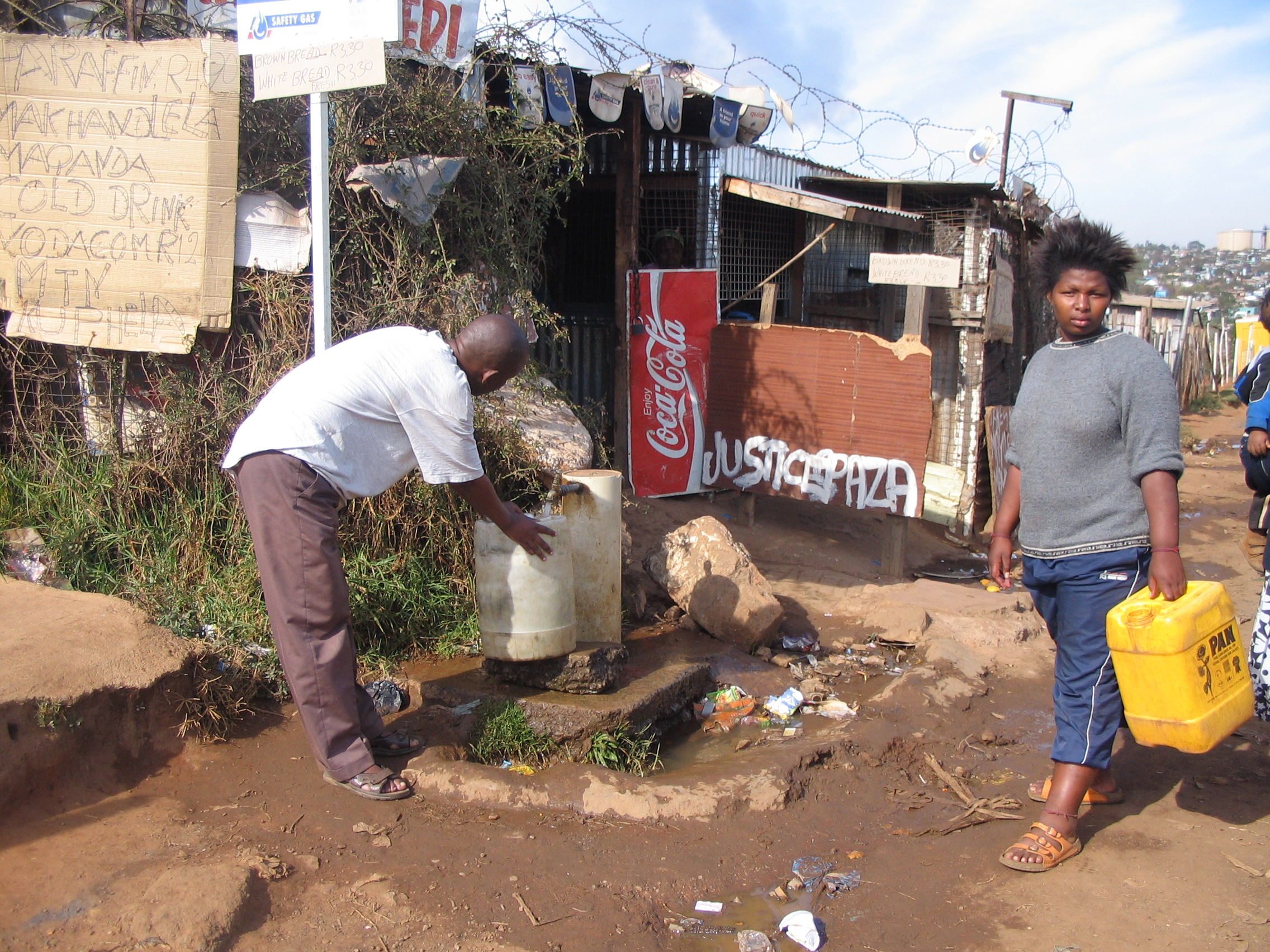
Communal tap (standpost) for drinking water in Soweto, Johannesburg, South Africa. May 2005.

Groundwater plays a key role in sustaining water supplies and livelihoods in sub-Saharan Africa especially due to its widespread availability, generally high quality, and intrinsic ability to buffer episodes of drought and increasing climate variability.

Yet there is limited sources available to provide clean drinkable water in Africa, one of the research cstudies onducted in 2007 has shown that over 40% of Africans use groundwater as their main source of drinking water, particularly in North and Southern African countries.

Piped water is still the most important source of drinking water (39%) in urban areas, yet boreholes are becoming more important (24%). The WHO (2006) stated that, in 2004, only 16% of people in sub-Saharan Africa had access to drinking water through a household connection (an indoor tap or a tap in the yard). Even when there is available water in these places, there is poor access to readily accessible drinking water, as there are risks of contamination due to several factors. Factors such as poor maintenance due to limited financial resources, pollution and poor sanitation sometimes due to limited financial resources. When wells are built and water sanitation facilities are developed, sometimes water quality testing is not performed as often as is necessary, and lack of education among the people utilizing the water source.

=== Surface water ===
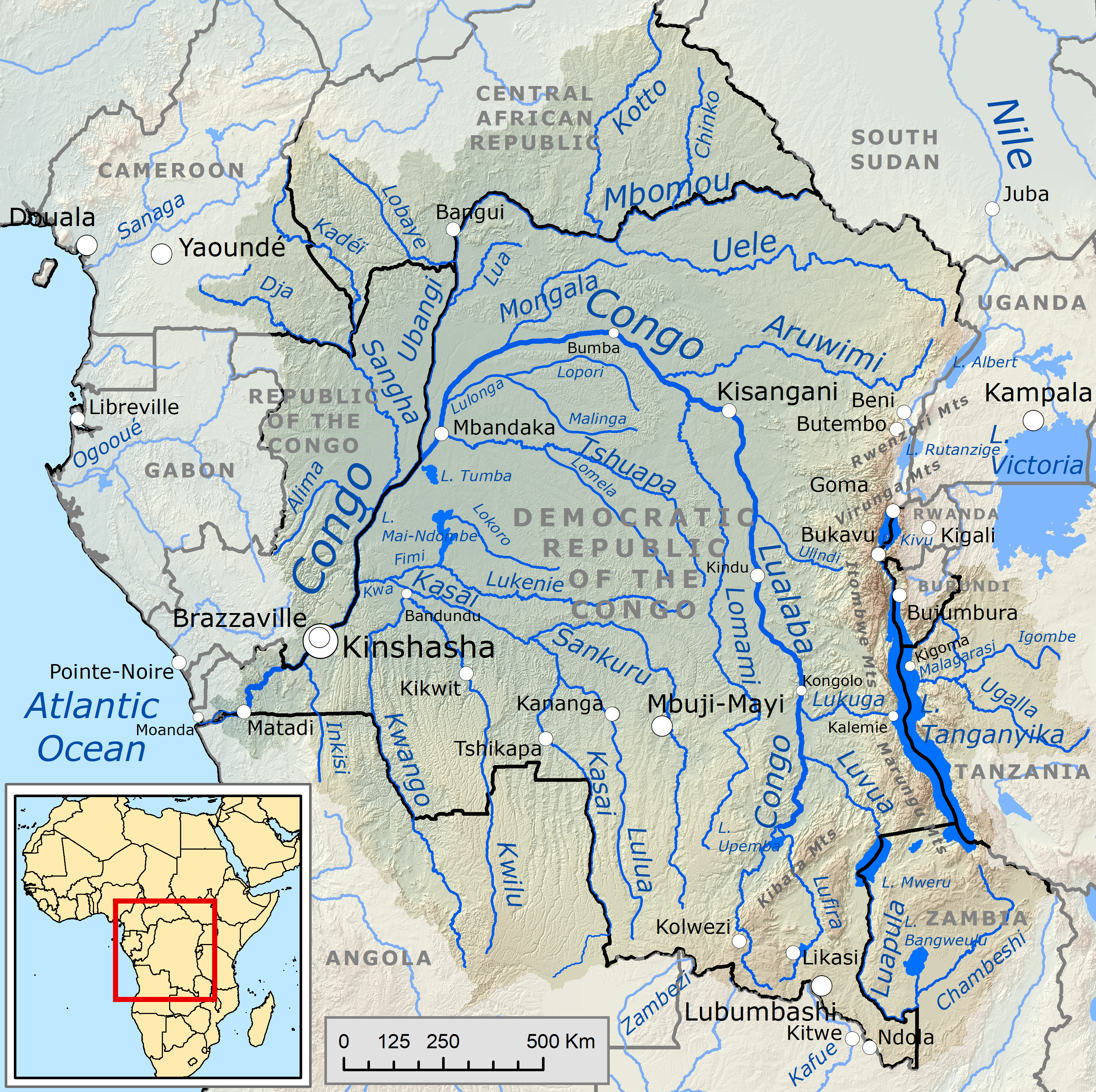
Congo Basin is the world's second largest river basin, covering over 12% of the African continent.

World Health Organisation (WHO) in 2015 reported that about 159 million people fetched untreated surface water from lakes, ponds, rivers and streams globally. Surface water sources in Africa are sometimes highly polluted. Factors such as sewage discharges, oil pollution, industrial factors, etc. For example, in a study conducted in Nigeria, major pollutants were found within the surrounding water, including agrochemical runoff, urban waste, and industrial effluents. In another case study conducted in Madagascar, Uganda, and Rwanda, researchers found that there were key contaminants polluting the bodies of water across all regions. These pollutants included E. coli, nitrates, and heavy metals. All of these contaminants found in the water created big concerns with the water safety for the people living in these areas.

Harvested rainwater is a minor source of water for many households, but its availability is unreliable because it depends on rainfall patterns. Although rainwater is relatively pure when it falls, it can become contaminated by dust, debris, animal droppings, and pollutants during collection and storage, so treatment may be required before drinking.

=== Impacts of climate change ===
The effects of climate change on the water cycle will have repercussions on the availability of water resources for human uses in Africa. For example, there will be changes to precipitation patterns, i.e. how much rain falls when and where.

Climate change is expected to amplify existing stress on water availability in Africa, however this impact is likely to be modest compared to drivers such as population growth, urbanization, agricultural growth and land-use change. While multiple factors will impact water availability in Africa, climate change will contribute to water shortages in North Africa and Southern Africa. In North Africa, climate change may account for 22% of the total water shortage in the region. Climate change as well as socio-economic drivers are also expected to intensify water scarcity in Southern Africa as increasing temperatures and variable rainfall lead to reduced streamflows in rivers across the region. Climate change is also likely to result in increased hydrological extremes, such as droughts, which are expected to last longer and happen more often in Southern Africa, placing considerable stress on water supply.

In East Africa changes in water resources are uncertain, as climate models in the region predict either increases or decreases in total rainfall over the region. Increasing temperature may increase evaporation and lead to shrinking glaciers and ice cover, which may place strain on water resource. However future projects indicate an increase in the intensity of rainfall which is likely to result in increased streamflows in regions such as the Lake Victoria Basin.

Köppen climate classification map for Africa for 1991–2020

2071–2100 map under the most intense climate change scenario. Mid-range scenarios are currently considered more likely.

Observed surface temperatures have generally increased over Africa since the late 19th century to the early 21st century by about 1 °C, but locally as much as 3 °C for minimum temperature in the Sahel at the end of the dry season. The warming of Africa has increased by +0.3 C from 1991 to 2021 versus +0.2 during 1961 to 1910. It is estimated that by 2030, the people of Africa will be exposed to a rise in sea level due to an increase in temperature. This will then cause agricultural productivity to decrease. Observed precipitation trends indicate spatial and temporal discrepancies as expected. The observed changes in temperature and precipitation vary regionally.

Current climate models (as summarised in the IPCC Sixth Assessment Report) predict increases in frequency and intensity of drought and heavy rainfall events. They also predict decreases in mean precipitation almost everywhere in Africa, with medium to high confidence. However, local rainfall trends and socio-climatic interactions are likely to manifest in mixed patterns. Therefore, the converging impacts of climate change will vary across the continent. In rural areas, rainfall patterns influence water usage.

A study in 2019 predicted increased dry spell length during wet seasons and increased extreme rainfall rates in Africa. In other words: "both ends of Africa's weather extremes will get more severe". The research found that most climate models will not be able to capture the extent of these changes because they are not convection-permitting at their coarse grid scales.

=== Water-related gender inequality ===
Across sub-Saharan Africa, access to sanitary water remains a significant challenge, particularly affecting women, who are often responsible for collecting water for their households. A study conducted in rural Zimbabwe found that women walk an average of 4 km daily to fetch water. During periods of drought, these trips can become even longer due to increased water scarcity. Drought conditions have also been linked to a higher likelihood of water point violence, which disproportionately affects women, as they make up the majority of water collectors. To reduce the risks associated with long journeys and water point violence, it has been suggested that policymakers invest in water infrastructure closer to residential areas. A study conducted in Ghana found that reduced access to water was associated with lower self-reported health and less relaxation time among women, who are primarily responsible for water collection in many households across Ghana and other communities in Sub-Saharan Africa. The findings indicated that for each additional hour spent collecting water, there was a corresponding decrease in the rate at which women reported feeling healthy.

== Access ==
=== General trends ===
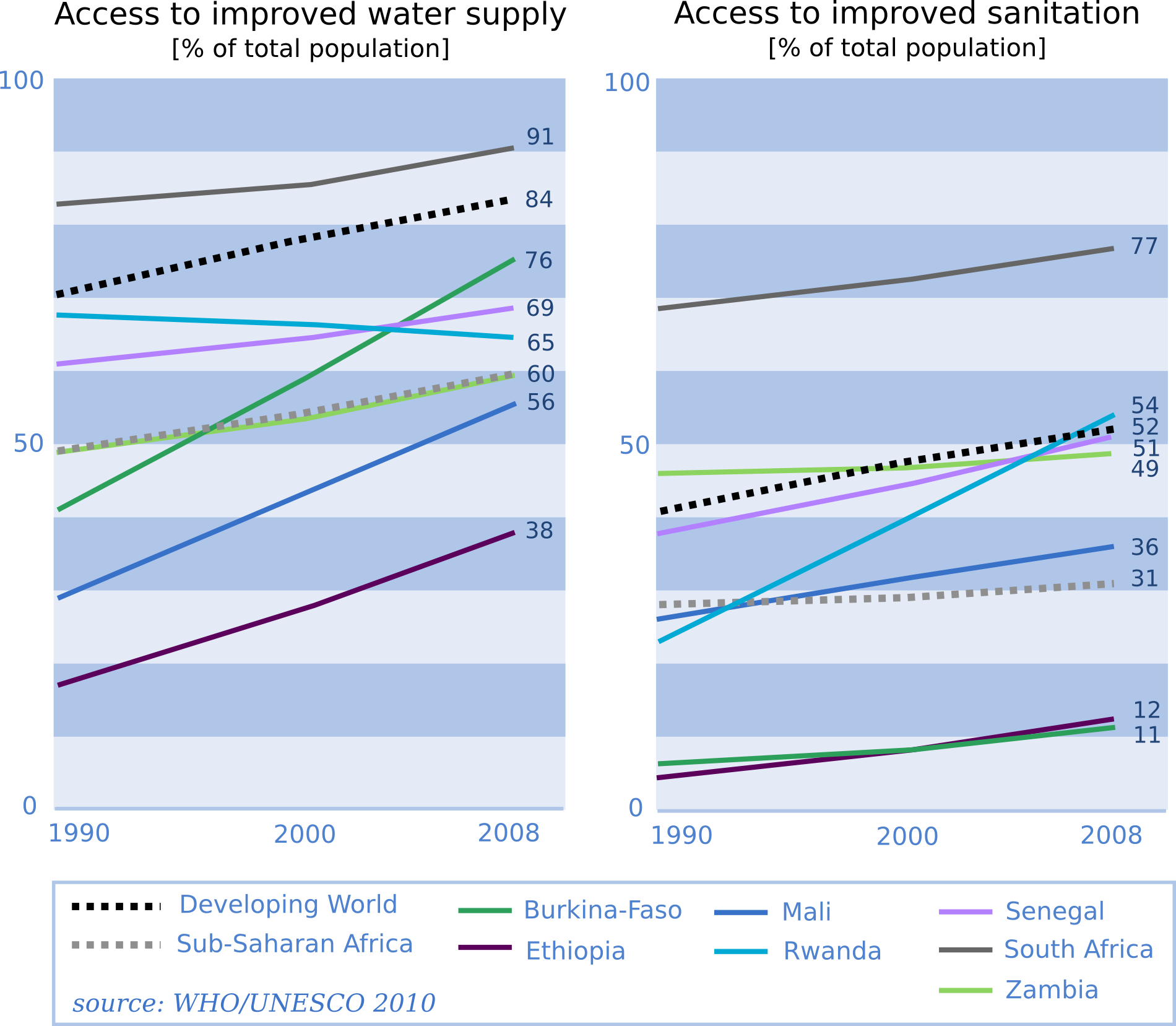
Access to improved water supply and sanitation, in 7 Sub-Saharan countries, from 1990 until 2008. Source: WHO/UNICEF Joint Monitoring Program (2010).

In sub-Saharan Africa access to water supply and sanitation has improved, but the region lags behind all other developing regions: access to safe drinking water had increased from 49% in 1990 to 60% in 2008, while in the same time span access to improved sanitation had only risen from 28% to 31%. Sub-Saharan Africa did not meet the Millennium Development Goals of halving the share of the population without access to safe drinking water and sanitation between 1990 and 2015.

These trends in water supply and sanitation are directly reflected in health: the under-five child mortality had significantly decreased worldwide, but Sub-Saharan Africa showed the slowest pace of progress.

The targets set under the Sustainable Development Goals in 2015 have, unlike the Millennium Development Goals, drinking water and sanitation reported separately – i.e., targets for access to safe and affordable drinking water (target 6.1) and adequate and equitable sanitation and hygiene (target 6.2). Particularly, Sustainable Development Goal SDG6 focuses on ensuring availability and sustainable management of water and sanitation for all. The SDGs have also included reporting on hygiene, that was missing within the MDGs. Access to hygiene facilities in particular is a major barrier to achieving combined SDG access, reducing coverage in SSA from 19.7% to 4.4% (data from 2017).

In 2020, 65% of the global population were using piped water (83% urban and 42% rural). Piped water counts as an improved water source. Overall, sub-Saharan Africa is lagging, with 35% of the population using piped water (56% urban and 20% rural). Within these statistics, access to safely managed drinking water varies within and between large cities, medium and small-towns.

With regard to WASH (water, sanitation and hygiene) in schools, data from 2019 showed that "Africa reports basic provision of WASH services in schools at 44 percent for drinking water, 47 percent for sanitation and 26 per cent for hygiene". In general, children who go to schools in ruralareals have less access to good WASH services than urban children.

Limited access to clean water has been shown to affect children in various ways. A case study in Ghana found that insufficient access to water was associated with lower school attendance rates among children. Additionally, limited access to water and cooking fuel was linked to lower academic performance, with the study noting an impact on test scores in subjects such as mathematics and English.

=== National differences ===
There are large disparities amongst countries in the Sub-Saharan region. Access to safe drinking water varies from 38% in Ethiopia to 91% in South Africa, while access to improved sanitation fluctuates from 11% in Burkina Faso to 77% in South Africa. The situation in Ivory Coast is significantly better, with the access to improved drinking water source at 82%

=== The urban-rural disparities ===
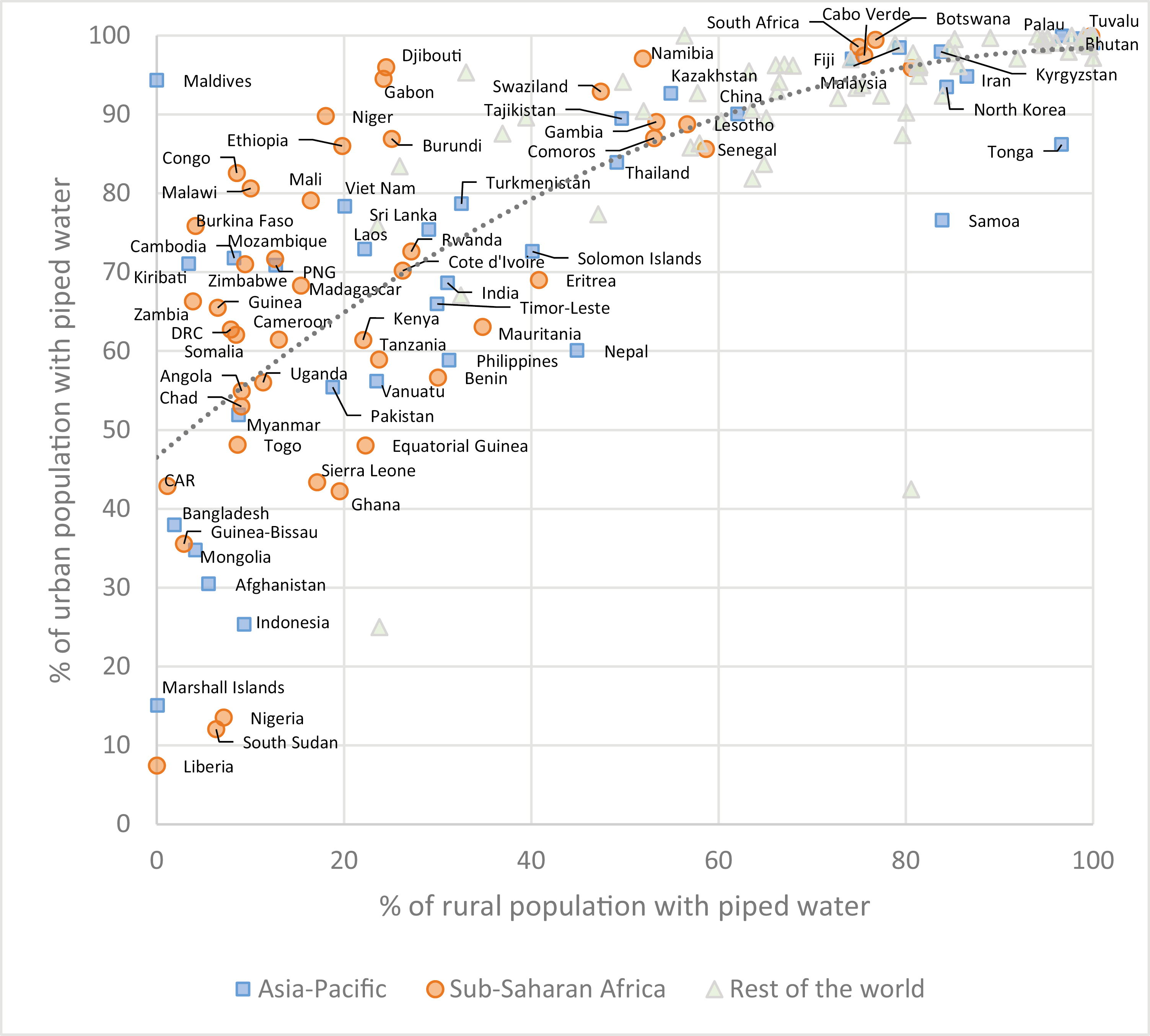
Urban and rural piped water coverage in Africa and Asia in 2015: Access to piped water in rural areas of Africa is consistently lower than in urban areas of Africa.

In the entire sub-Saharan region, water supply and sanitation coverage in urban areas is almost double the coverage in rural areas, both for water (83% in urban areas, 47% in rural areas) as for sanitation (44% vs. 24%). Yet, the rural areas improve at fa ast pace, whereas in urban areas, the extension of water supply and sanitation infrastructure can barely keep up with the fast urban demographic growth.

=== Different interpretations of access ===
Remark that the concepts 'access' and 'improved' are not unequivocal. The definitions used by the WHO/UNICEF Joint Monitoring Program for Water Supply and Sanitation do not necessarily coincide with those of other surveys or national policies. The government of Burkina Faso, for instance, takes into account aspects such as waiting time and water quality. In fact, almost half of the Sub-Saharan households that according to WHO/UNICEF 'have access to improved water supply', spend more than half an hour a day collecting the water. Although this loss of time is mentioned in the WHO/UNICEF report, it does not affect their 'improved' vs. 'non-improved' distinction.

== National stakeholders in water supply and sanitation ==
Since the 1990s almost all African countries have been decentralising their political powers from the centre towards local authorities: in Mali it started in 1993, in Ethiopia in 1995, in Rwanda in 2002, in Burkina Faso in 2004, ... Along with the decentralisation process, a reform of the water supply and sanitation sector has been put through. The institutional structures for water supply and sanitation that came out of it differ throughout the continent. Two general distinctions can be made.

A first distinction should be made between water supply and sanitation responsibilities in (i) urban areas and (ii) rural areas. Most governments have created corporatised utilities for water supply and sanitation in the urban areas. In rural areas the responsibilities usually rest in the hands of the municipality, community-based groups, or local private companies. The task of the central government is generally limited to setting the national goals and regulations for water supply and sanitation.

A second distinction, with respect to the urban areas, exists between those countries (mostly francophone) that have retained one national utility active in all urban areas of the country, and other countries (mostly anglophone) that have further decentralised the utilities to local jurisdictions

=== Urban areas ===
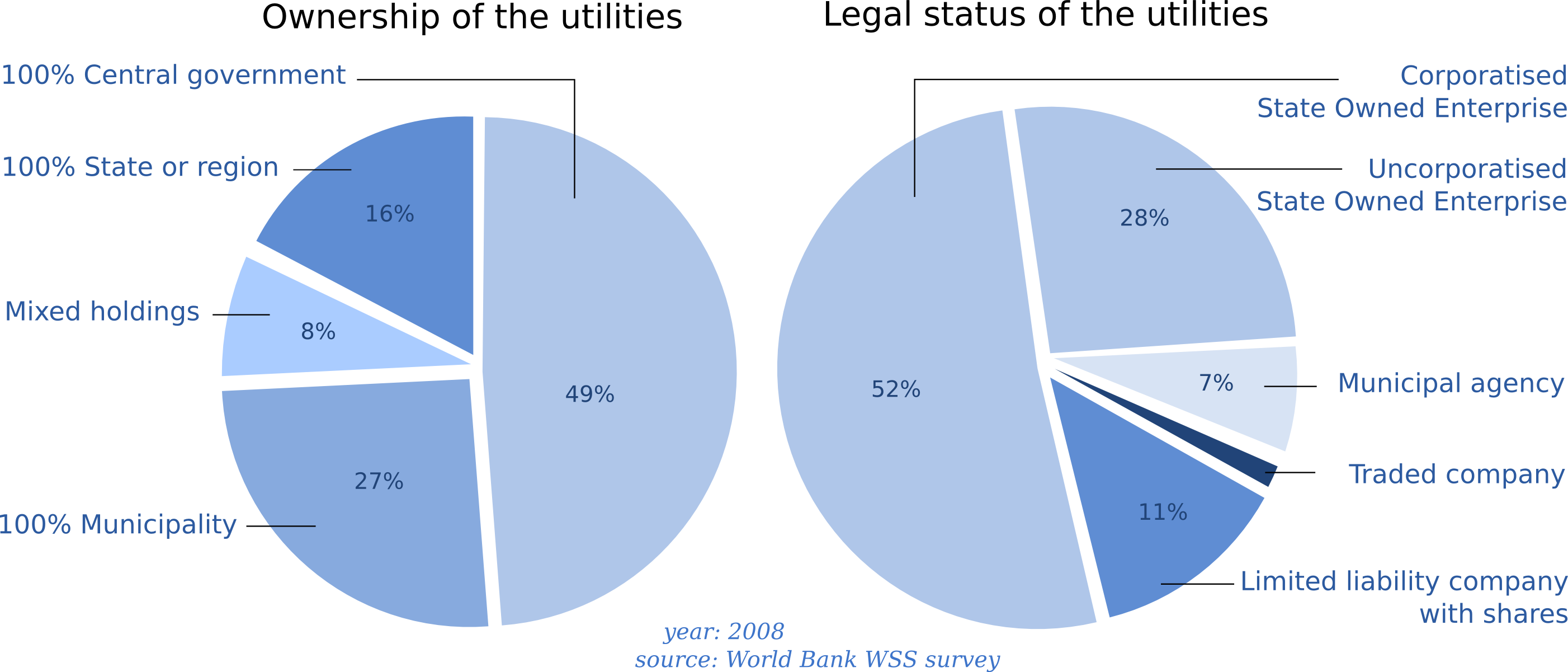
Involvement of the private sector in the Sub-Saharan water utilities. AICD Background Paper 12.

In the last two decades, the management of urban water supply and sanitation has been increasingly put in hands of newly created utilities. In some cases these water supply and sanitation utilities also supply electricity. The majority of these utilities are corporatized, meaning that they emulate a private company in terms of productivity and financial independence. Nevertheless, they widely differ in legal status and ownership structure.

There were hopes that, by creating independent utilities, their business could become commercially sustainable and attract private capital. Almost half of the sub-Saharan countries have experimented with some form of private sector participation in the utility sector since the early 1990s, which was largely supported by the World Bank. The experience with these private sector contracts has been mixed. While they did not succeed in attracting much private capital, some of them improved performance. However, almost one third have been ended before their intended termination, such as in Dar es-Salaam in Tanzania. Others were not renewed.

Today nearly half of the utilities are public enterprises and majority-owned by the central government. Senegal is an example where private involvement was successful: the affermage (leasing) of the network to a private operator has considerably increased efficiency and contributed to increase access. Senegal also received external funding for its water treatment and distribution network, namely a €64.5 million loan from the European Investment Bank combined with a €5.55 million European Union grant to the Republic of Senegal in 2023. The funding aims to provide drinking water to Saint-Louis inhabitants, reservoir units, and the enlargement of its distribution network, which is crucial to avoid the relocation of inhabitants due to lack of water. The €5.55 million European Union fund, mobilized as part of Team Europe by the European Investment Bank, will assist Senegal's water utility in accelerating its 35000 subsidised drinking water connections for 350000 consumers across the nation. Besides Senegal, private operators still have a role in South Africa (four utilities), Cameroon, Cape Verde, Ivory Coast, Gabon, Ghana, Mozambique, Niger and Uganda (in small towns). In Uganda and Burkina Faso public national utilities were strengthened through short-term public-private partnerships in the form of performance-based service contracts.

The utilities never reach all households in their territory. The share of unconnected urban households fluctuates from over 80% in poor countries like Uganda, Mozambique, Rwanda, Nigeria, and Madagascar, to 21% in Namibia and 12% in South Africa.

Some African utilities are in charge of water supply only, while others are in charge of sanitation as well. Some national water utilities, especially in Francophone Africa, also provide electricity. This is the case in Gabon, Mauritania and Rwanda, among others.

Rapid urbanization and demographic growth in Sub-Saharan Africa have exacerbated challenges in providing piped water access, particularly in peri-urban and slum areas. Recent data from UNICEF (2023) indicates that while urban access to improved water sources has grown overall, the share of urban households connected to piped water continues to decline in sub-Saharan Africa. These households increasingly rely on alternative water sources such as shared standpipes, boreholes, and water vendors, which often lack reliability and affordability. The disparity between rural and urban water access persists, with urban households better served overall but still facing significant barriers to equitable and sustainable water service.

=== Rural areas ===
The responsibility for water supply and sanitation in rural areas has in most countries been decentralised to the municipalities: they determine the water and sanitation needs and plan the infrastructure, in line with the national water laws. Various central governments have created a national social fund (supported by donors) from which the municipalities can draw money to finance rural water supply and sanitation infrastructure. Although the municipalities usually own the infrastructure, they rarely provide the service. This it is rather delegated to community-led organisations or local private companies. Studies by the World Bank and others suggest the need for more attention to private sector operation of all types of rural water supplies.

In Kenya, Tanzania and South Africa, utilities provide services to rural dwellers as well, although this does not preclude the coexistence of different arrangements for the rural space in those countries. In Rwanda local private operators are common in rural areas. Most countries in the region take on an active role in building infrastructure (mostly boreholes). Other countries are trying different approaches, such as self-supply of water and sanitation, where most of the investment costs for simple systems are born by the users. Self-supply is currently part of national policies in Ethiopia and has been implemented at scale in Zimbabwe in the past.

Local revenue generation underpins delivery of drinking water services in rural Africa yet is threatened by seasonal rainfall and water usage patterns. There is evidence that intra-seasonal rainfall analysis can enhance rural piped water revenue planning by offering localised insight into water demand dynamics and revealing where climate variability may increase dependence on reliable services. There is a seasonal threat to rural piped water revenue in, for example Ghana, Rwanda, and Uganda. It appears to decrease with frequency of dry intervals during the wet season, which is a metric of rainfall variability.

== Private water service providers ==
Small private water service providers (WSPs) are common in many developing countries, also in Sub-Saharan Africa. They often operate in informal ways and fill the gaps left by formal government provision of water supply. Examples for cities where small private WSPs are common include for example Nairobi (Kenya) and Dar es Salam (Tanzania).

There are three categories of private water service providers:

- "wholesale vendors who commercially extract water from boreholes and sell to distributing vendors";
- "direct vendors who sell water from kiosks, standpipes or household connections to consumers on-site"; and
- "distributing vendors who transport water from wholesale or direct vendors to consumers via carts, motorbike or tanker trucks".

Potential problems with these informal water service providers is the amount of profit they might make and if this is "fair". Predatory pricing can be another potential problem. Also, there could be microbial contamination of the drinking water they are selling due to contaminated water containers used in the process.

On the other hand, as of 2017, the JMP does recognize packaged or delivered water as a water source that falls into the grouping of improved water source.

== Quality of service ==
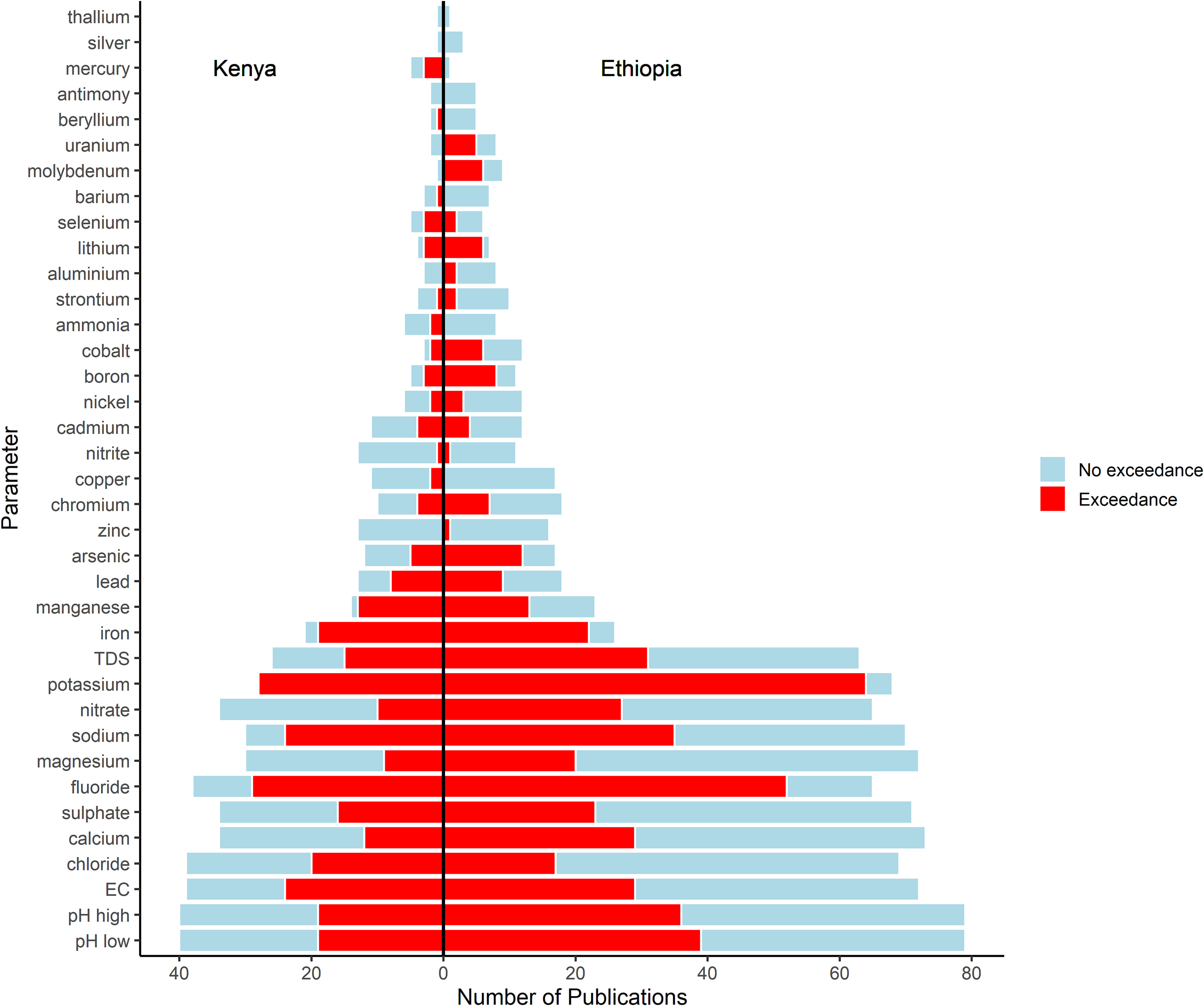
Example for drinking water quality issues in Kenya and Ethiopia: Stacked bar chart of the number of publications reporting data for each water quality parameter, with publications grouped as reporting no water points exceeding guideline threshold or reporting at least one water point exceeding threshold. The chosen thresholds are from the country's standards or WHO health guideline or East Africa Standard (EAS) for natural potable water.

A first indicator of the quality of water supply services is the continuity of service. The urban utilities deliver continuous services in Burkina Faso, Senegal and South Africa but are highly intermittent in Ethiopia and Zambia. In rural areas, continuity is expressed by the ratio of water points out of order or by the average time per year or per month that a water point is unusable. Due to the significant population growth of communities, water supply levels are unable to meet the demand, limiting the access to clean drinking water.

A second indicator of quality is the compliance with microbiological water norms. WHO/UNESCO has recently developed a Rapid Assessment of Drinking-Water Quality (RADWQ) survey method. On average, in developing countries, compliance with the WHO norms is close to 90% for piped water, and between 40% and 70% for other improved sources. No national or regional data have been published yet.

Low income households in sub-Saharan Africa are significantly impacted by quality of service because they have limited access to clean water sources. Thus, increasing their chances of contracting waterborne diseases due to the lack of quality service on water sources surrounding these communities. Many communities are required to walk miles just to have access to clean water. There is no direct solution to this issue because it is so widespread. Lots of work must be done in order for major solutions to be put in place.

== Financial aspects ==
=== Tariffs and cost recovery ===
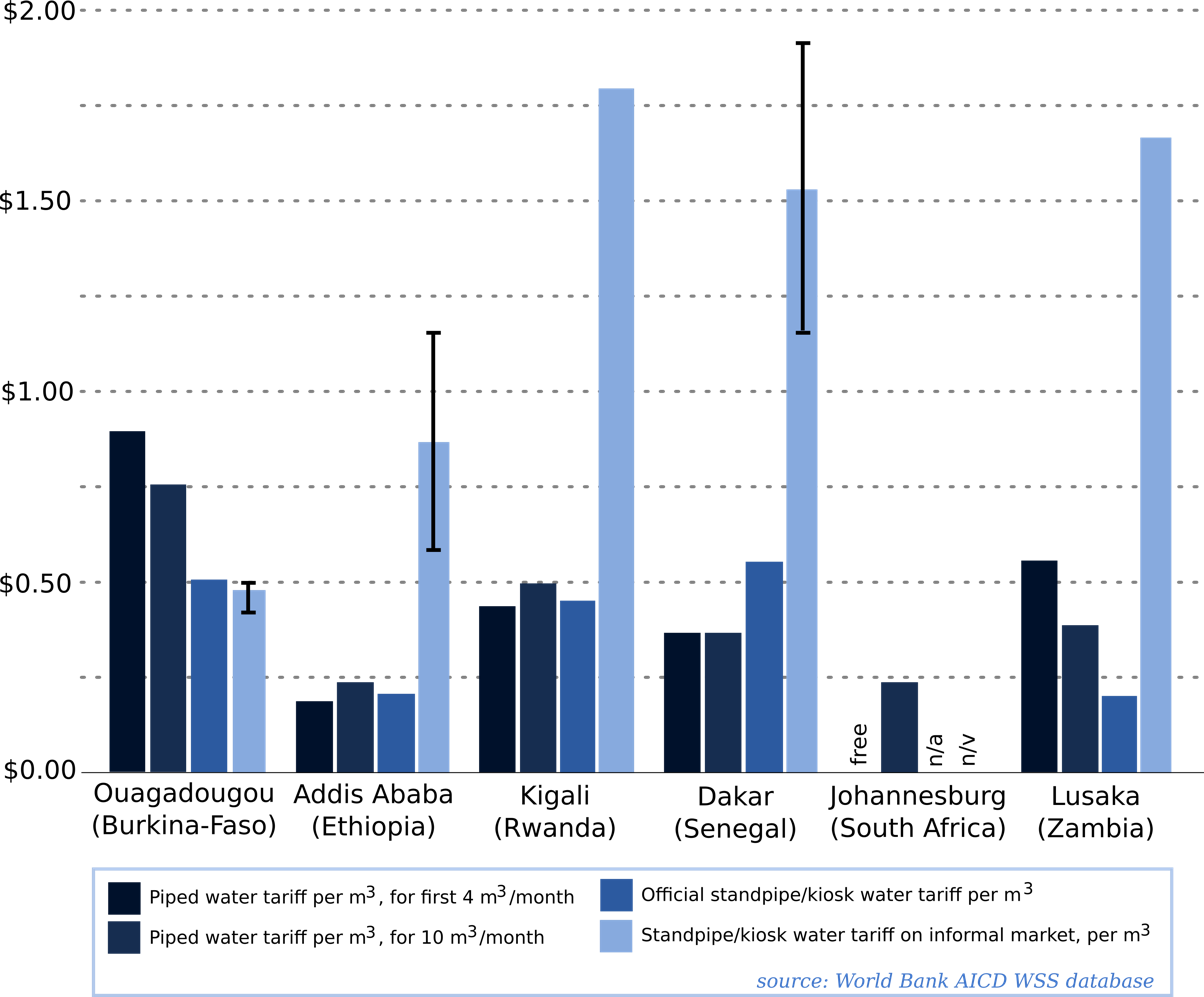
Formal and informal water tariffs in 6 Sub-Saharan Cities. World Bank WSS survey database.

There is an overall underpricing of formal water and sanitation services in sub-Saharan Africa. A first consequence is an insufficient cost recovery, leading to dependency on foreign aid and governmental support, and to insufficient investments. Second, underpricing is socially unfair. Since the poorest social groups are less connected to water networks and sewerage, they need to turn to alternatives, and they pay in some cases a multiple of the formal tariff. Hence, the poorest are hit twice: they have less access to improved water supply and sanitation, and they need to pay more.

South Africa stands out for having introduced free basic utility services for all, including 6m^{3} of water per month for free.

Tariffs of about $0.40 per m^{3} are considered sufficient to cover operating costs in most developing-country contexts, while $1.00 would cover operation, maintenance and infrastructure. Assuming that a tariff is affordable as long as the bill does not exceed 5% of the household's budget, the World Bank calculates that even in the low-income sub-Saharan countries, up to 40% of the households should be able to pay the full-cost tariff of $1 per m^{3}

=== Efficiency ===
The number of employees per 1000 connections is an indicator of the technical efficiency of utilities. In sub-Saharan Africa, the average is 6. The highest efficiency is observed in South Africa, where the four utilities need 2.1–4.0 employees per 1000 connections. Rwanda peaks with 38.6 employees per 1000 connections.

Another indicator is the share of non-revenue water (water that is lost or not metered). In an efficiently managed system, this amount is below 25%. In 2005 it was estimated to be 20% in Senegal, 18% in Burkina Faso, 16% for the Water Utility Corporation in Botswana, 14% in Windhoek in Namibia and 12% in Drakenstein, South Africa. These utilities have achieved levels of non-revenue water similar to levels in OECD countries. However, in other African countries the level of non-revenue water is extremely high: For example, it exceeds 45% in Zambia, is more than 60% in Maputo (Water supply and sanitation in Mozambique|Mozambique), 75% in Lindi (Tanzania) and 80% in Kaduna (Nigeria). Few data are available for efficiency in the rural space.

=== Expenditures ===
In sub-Saharan Africa, current spending on water supply and sanitation (investments, operation and maintenance) totals to $7.6 billion per year, or 1.19% of the regional GDP. This includes $4.7 billion per year for investments (2001-2005 average). According to the World Bank, total expenditures are less than half of what would be required to achieve the Millennium Development Goals in sub-Saharan Africa; that would need more than $16.5 billion per year or 2.6% of the regional GDP. The African Development Bank estimates that $12 billion is required annually to cover Africa's needs in improved water supply and sanitation.

Expenditures are often not well targeted. According to a World Bank study, there is a large gap in expenditures between rural and urban areas, in particular capital cities. Public expenditures go to where they are most easily spent rather than where they are most urgently needed. Sanitation receives only a small part of public expenditures: low household demand for sanitation results in politicians not seeing sanitation as a vote winner, and therefore allocating scarce resources to sectors with higher perceived political rewards.

=== Financing ===
Out of the $4.7 billion of investments in water supply and sanitation in sub-Saharan Africa, 70% is financed internally and only 30% is financed externally (2001-2005 average). Most of the internal financing is household self-finance ($2.1bn), which is primarily for on-site sanitation such as pit latrines. Public sector financing ($1.2bn) is almost as high as external financing (US$1.4bn). The contribution of private commercial financing has been negligible at $10 million only.

The share of external financing varies greatly. In the 2001-2005 period official development assistance financed 71% of investments in Benin, 68% in Tanzania, 63% in Kenya, 43% in the DR of Congo, 34% in South Africa, 13% in Nigeria and less than 1% in Côte d'Ivoire or Botswana. According to another World Bank study of 5 countries, in the 2002-2008 period official development assistance financed on average 62% of public expenditures on water and sanitation. The share varied from 83% in Sierra Leone to 23% in the Republic of Congo.

== External cooperation ==
In 2008, $1.6 billion of foreign aid flowed into the water supply and sanitation sector in sub-Saharan Africa, which is 4% of all development aid disbursed to sub-Saharan Africa. This foreign aid covered 21% of all expenditures in water supply and sanitation in sub-Saharan Africa, and was principally directed to investments in infrastructure. Operation and maintenance is financed by the national governments and consumer revenues.

The largest donors to water supply and sanitation in sub-Saharan Africa are the World Bank, the EU institutions, the African Development Fund, and bilateral assistance from Germany and the Netherlands. The United States, although they are the largest donor in Sub-Saharan Africa in absolute numbers, play a marginal role in the water supply and sanitation sector.

Aid to SSA, in US$ millions and % of total
Source	Total	WSS only
World Bank (IDA)	4 856 (12.3%)	378 (24.1%)
EU institutions	5 056 (12.8%)	266 (16.6%)
African Development Fund	1 780 (4.5%)	193 (12.0%)
Germany	2 906 (7.4%)	171 (10.7%)
Netherlands	1 446 (3.7%)	137 (8.5%)
United States	6 875 (17.4%)	13 (0.8%)
Total	39 451 (100%)	1 603 (100%)

Especially in the poorer countries the presence of many different donors and Western NGOs puts a strain on the coherence of national strategies, such as in Burkina Faso and Ethiopia. Foreign aid comes in at all levels: the central government, the national social funds, the utilities, the local authorities, local NGOs,... Although most foreign actors try to inscribe their aid in the existing national structures, their implementation approaches and technical solutions often differ.

== Strategies for improvement ==
The final report on Africa's Infrastructure, has the following recommendations for the water supply and sanitation sector:

- continue the institutional reforms: more efficient internal processes, increased autonomy of the utilities, better performance monitoring
- improve the efficacy of governmental expenditure
- experiment with different models to connect the unconnected, since investments in piped networks cannot keep pace with urban growth
- devise socially fair tariffs that nonetheless cover the real cost of water supply and sanitation
- improve the understanding of groundwater extraction in urban areas, since this is the fastest growing source of improved water supply.
- the international carbon offset market create a sustainable revenue stream towards clean water sources in Africa for more sustainable systems.

== See also ==
- List of water supply and sanitation by country
- Sanitation worker
- Self-supply of water and sanitation
- Water-related industry in Africa
- Water supply and sanitation in Latin America
- Water privatization
- Water management
