= Water supply and sanitation in Ivory Coast =

Data
- Access to an at least basic water source: 77% (2024)
- Access to at least basic sanitation: 40% (2024)

Institutions
- Water and sanitation regulator: ONEP
- Responsibility for policy setting: Ministry of Hydraulics, Sanitation and Salubrity
- No. of urban service providers: SODECI
- No. of rural service providers: Government, local systems and delegated operators

Water supply and sanitation in Ivory Coast concerns access to drinking water, sanitation, wastewater management, drainage and hygiene services in Ivory Coast, officially the Republic of Côte d'Ivoire. The country has expanded access to drinking-water services, especially in urban areas, but gaps remain in rural water supply, sanitation, open defecation, wastewater treatment and service reliability.

According to the World Bank's World Development Indicators, based on data from the WHO/UNICEF Joint Monitoring Programme for Water Supply, Sanitation and Hygiene, 77 percent of the population used at least basic drinking-water services in 2024. Access to at least basic sanitation services was lower, at 40 percent of the population in 2024. Open defecation remained a public-health and environmental issue, with 17 percent of the population practising open defecation in 2024.

Urban water supply is operated mainly by SODECI, a private operator working under an affermage or lease-type arrangement with the state. The National Drinking Water Office, known in French as the Office national de l'eau potable (ONEP), is responsible for infrastructure development, asset management and oversight of the drinking-water sector. Sanitation, drainage and flood-protection services are under the oversight of the Ministry of Hydraulics, Sanitation and Salubrity and the National Office of Sanitation and Drainage, known as ONAD.

== Access ==
=== Drinking water ===
Ivory Coast has higher access to basic drinking-water services than to basic sanitation. In 2024, 77 percent of the population used at least basic drinking-water services. Basic drinking-water service refers to drinking water from an improved source, provided collection time is not more than 30 minutes for a round trip.

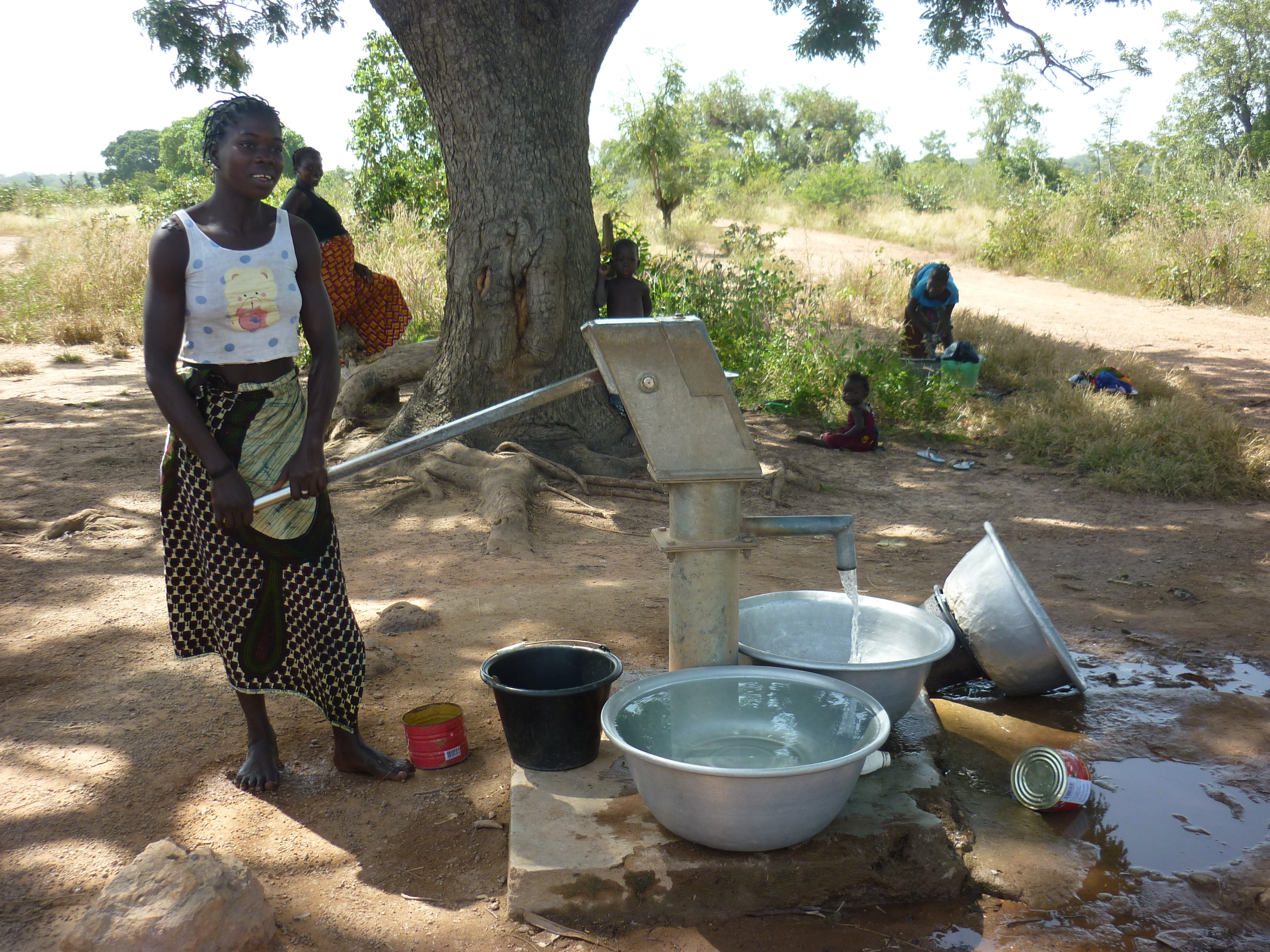
Women fetching water

Access remains uneven across urban and rural areas. Urban households are more likely to have piped water or improved sources close to the home, while many rural communities depend on boreholes, standpipes, village water systems, protected wells and small piped schemes. The World Bank reported in 2024 that rural access remained a major policy concern and that the government planned to scale up multi-village systems as part of its rural water strategy.

The national rural water strategy includes a model known as système multi-villages (SMV), under which several villages are grouped around one production system such as a treatment plant or interconnected boreholes. The government set a goal of connecting 1,000 localities per year, equivalent to about 200 SMV systems by 2030, with the aim of providing improved water to 95 percent of the rural population.

=== Sanitation ===
Sanitation coverage is lower than drinking-water coverage. In 2024, 40 percent of the population used at least basic sanitation services. At least basic sanitation refers to the use of improved sanitation facilities that are not shared with other households.

The World Bank reported that safely managed sanitation remained limited. Based on 2022 JMP data cited in a World Bank project document, about 17 percent of the population had access to safely managed sanitation services, below the sub-Saharan African average cited in that document. Many households rely on onsite sanitation systems such as pit latrines and septic tanks. These systems require safe emptying, transport, treatment and disposal or reuse of faecal sludge, but services are absent or weak in many locations.

Open defecation remains a challenge, especially in rural areas. World Bank/JMP data placed national open defecation at 17 percent in 2024. UNICEF reported that the rate remained high in rural areas, where it was estimated at 38 percent in 2024.

== Service quality ==
Service quality varies by location, type of settlement and water source. In urban areas, service quality depends on production capacity, storage, distribution networks, pressure, continuity of supply and household connections. In rural areas, service quality depends on water-point functionality, distance, maintenance arrangements, water quality and the reliability of boreholes or small piped systems.

Urban water supply has received large investments in secondary cities. The World Bank reported that the Urban Water Supply and Sanitation Strengthening Project provided improved water supply to 1,983,330 people in 10 secondary cities. The project supported 10 water treatment plants with 85,960 m^{3} per day of capacity, 12 storage reservoirs with 15,550 m^{3} of storage and 1,823 km of distribution networks.

Water shortages have been reported in parts of Abidjan, where population growth, urban expansion and climate variability have placed pressure on water production and distribution. In 2019, a report republished by PreventionWeb described chronic shortages in parts of the city and linked the problem to rapid urbanization, rising demand and reduced groundwater replenishment.

Water supply and sanitation services also face pressure from rapid urbanization, population growth, ageing infrastructure, water losses, sanitation gaps and pollution of surface and groundwater resources. Poor sanitation can reduce water security when untreated sewage enters rivers, drains, wetlands or densely populated areas.

== Water resources ==
Ivory Coast has surface-water and groundwater resources that support domestic water supply, agriculture, hydropower, fisheries and industry. Major river systems include the Bandama River, Sassandra River, Comoé River and Cavalla River. Urban water supply systems draw from surface water and groundwater depending on the region, city size, aquifer conditions and treatment capacity.

Water security has become a national planning concern because of demographic growth, climate variability, urban expansion and regional inequalities. The World Bank's Water Security and Sanitation Support Project was designed to strengthen water-resources management and increase access to water and sanitation services in selected regions of the country. The first phase focuses on northern regions, which the World Bank identified as having the highest risk of water scarcity, low access to water and sanitation, and strong demographic growth.

== History and sector reforms ==
Ivory Coast has one of the longest-running private-sector participation models in urban water supply in sub-Saharan Africa. SODECI began operating urban water services under a lease or affermage-type arrangement, with the state retaining ownership of assets and policy responsibility. A World Bank study of urban water utilities in West and Central Africa described Côte d'Ivoire as a case where the government expanded SODECI's role to operate and maintain water-supply facilities under an affermage contract.

Institutional reform continued in the 2000s. ONEP was created as an autonomous state corporation to serve as the main agency for infrastructure development, asset management and oversight of the drinking-water sector. ONEP's duties include oversight of SODECI's performance contract, while ministries retain responsibility for sector policy, infrastructure ownership, tariff approval and strategic planning.

Sanitation and drainage have developed through a separate institutional structure. ONAD is responsible for sanitation and drainage services and describes its mandate as ensuring sustainable and affordable access to sanitation and drainage facilities for the national population.

== Responsibility for water supply and sanitation ==
=== Policy and regulation ===
The Ministry of Hydraulics, Sanitation and Salubrity is responsible for policy in drinking water, sanitation and public cleanliness. Its official portal presents its hydraulic mission as developing and guaranteeing access to drinking water for populations in Côte d'Ivoire, while its sanitation mission concerns the development and implementation of sanitation policy.

ONEP is the main public agency for drinking-water infrastructure development, asset management and sector oversight. It supervises water-sector investments and performance arrangements with SODECI. The World Bank has noted institutional limitations in the sector, including the fact that ONEP has historically received remuneration from government as a delegated project manager while not legally owning assets.

=== Service provision ===
SODECI is the main urban water operator. It operates drinking-water services under a lease-type arrangement with the state and has long been central to urban water distribution in the country.

Sanitation and drainage services are handled through ONAD and related public and private arrangements. The World Bank reported that SODECI has also been contracted to operate the sewer system in Abidjan through an affermage contract separate from its water-service contract. ONAD states that its responsibilities include sanitation in urban areas, peri-urban environments and rural areas, including rainwater collection infrastructure for flood prevention, wastewater disposal and the elimination of open defecation in rural areas.

== Urban water supply ==
Urban water supply has historically relied on a national service model, with SODECI operating water systems while public authorities retain responsibility for policy, asset ownership and investment planning. The model has often been cited as one of the better-known public-private partnership arrangements in African water supply.

Recent investments have focused on expanding production, storage and distribution in urban and secondary cities. The Urban Water Supply and Sanitation Project, also known by its French acronym PREMU, had a revised objective to increase access to and quality of water services, increase access to sanitation in selected urban areas and improve planning and monitoring of the urban water sector.

As of March 2024, World Bank project documents reported that 1,748,020 people were already benefiting from improved water supply services through PREMU, surpassing the original project target. The project also included new piped household connections, reactivation of inactive household connections, additional production capacity, water storage and distribution networks.

== Rural water supply ==
Rural water supply remains a major challenge. Rural communities often depend on boreholes, small piped schemes, protected wells and local water systems. The World Bank reported that the government intended to use multi-village systems as the default rural water model, grouping up to five localities into one system when feasible.

The northern regions are a priority because of water scarcity risk, low access to services and demographic growth. The Water Security and Sanitation Support Project is the first project supporting implementation of the National Water Security Strategy to 2030 and focuses initially on 11 northern regions. The project aims to strengthen water-resources management and increase access to water and sanitation services in selected regions.

Women and girls are often affected by distance and time spent collecting water in rural communities. The World Bank project includes an indicator on women in rural areas spending more than 30 minutes a day fetching water, reflecting the social dimension of rural water access.

== Sanitation and wastewater ==
Sanitation in Ivory Coast includes sewerage, drainage, onsite sanitation and faecal sludge management. In Abidjan, sewerage operation is contracted to SODECI under an affermage arrangement, while ONAD is responsible for broader sanitation and drainage services.

Most people rely on individual sanitation facilities such as pit latrines and septic tanks. These require safe emptying and treatment, but faecal sludge services are weak or absent in many areas. The World Bank reported that raw sewage is often disposed of in natural bodies or populated areas, with harmful effects on ecosystems and human health.

The sanitation service chain needs strengthening from household containment to emptying, transport, treatment and safe reuse or disposal. Rural sanitation is supervised through structures within the ministry responsible for sanitation, including rural sanitation and hygiene services that apply national guidelines for latrine construction and maintenance.

== Public health and WASH ==
Sanitation and drinking-water safety are linked to public-health risks. In June 2025, Ivory Coast declared a cholera outbreak after cases and deaths were confirmed in Vridi Akobrate, near Abidjan. Associated Press reported that health authorities urged people to drink safe water, avoid unsafe street-sold water bags and wash hands regularly during the outbreak.

The International Federation of Red Cross and Red Crescent Societies reported that Red Cross teams carried out cholera-prevention activities in Vridi Ako after the 2025 outbreak, including community sensitisation on safe water, hygiene and sanitation practices.

== Drainage and flood management ==
Urban drainage is linked to sanitation, wastewater and flood control. ONAD identifies drainage and flood-prevention infrastructure as part of its urban sanitation responsibilities. It also runs public communication on issues such as preventing construction on waterways and stopping garbage disposal in gutters.

Flooding and poor drainage are important urban-service concerns, especially in Abidjan and other growing cities. Blocked drains, informal settlement growth, inadequate stormwater infrastructure and poor solid-waste management can worsen urban flood risk and sanitation exposure.

== Finance and investment ==
Large water and sanitation investments in Ivory Coast have been supported by the government and development partners. The World Bank approved a US$50 million credit for the Urban Water Supply Project in 2016 and later approved US$150 million in additional financing for the urban water supply and sanitation project. The project financed urban water supply, urban sanitation, urban water-sector strengthening and project management.

In 2019, the World Bank announced US$150 million in additional financing for Phase II of the Urban Water Supply and Sanitation Project. The financing was intended to improve safe drinking-water access, construct or rehabilitate hygiene facilities in schools and provide water services to more than one million people in 12 secondary cities.

The World Bank also reported that the Government of Côte d'Ivoire is implementing its National Development Plan 2021–2025, which aims to improve access to water, electricity, health, social protection and employment as part of wider structural transformation.

== External cooperation ==
International cooperation in the sector includes support from the World Bank, UNICEF, the African Development Bank and other development partners. The World Bank has financed projects in urban water supply, sanitation, sector planning and water security. UNICEF supports water, sanitation and hygiene programmes, including work on sanitation, hygiene and reducing open defecation.

== Challenges ==
Major challenges include rural water access, open defecation, low safely managed sanitation coverage, weak faecal sludge management, wastewater pollution, drainage constraints, climate risk and regional inequality. The sanitation gap is especially important because untreated waste can pollute water bodies and reduce the quality and quantity of freshwater available for other uses.

Water-security concerns are especially important in vulnerable regions of the country. Sanitation and Water for All describes Côte d'Ivoire as having launched a five-year programme combining water resources, water supply and sanitation in the country's most vulnerable areas.

The rural water challenge is linked to distance, seasonal reliability, maintenance and the need for larger multi-village systems. Urban challenges include expanding water production, improving distribution networks, maintaining pressure, connecting low-income households, managing wastewater and reducing flood risk through better drainage.

== See also ==
- Ivory Coast
- SODECI
- Water supply and sanitation in sub-Saharan Africa
- Water supply and sanitation in Ghana
- Water supply and sanitation in Senegal
- Water supply and sanitation in Nigeria
- Open defecation
- Faecal sludge management
- Drinking water
- Sanitation
