= Water supply and sanitation in Rwanda =

Data
- Water coverage (broad definition): 77% (2015)
- Sanitation coverage (broad definition): 57% (2015)
- Continuity of supply: n/a
- Average urban water use (L/person/day): n/a
- Average urban water and sanitation tariff (US$/m^{3}): 2700 Rwandan Franc (USD 4) per month for 10 cubic meters in urban areas, at the 2013 exchange rate of 670 RWF per USD
- Share of household metering: n/a
- Annual investment in WSS: US$4/capita (2006) in rural areas alone
- Share of external financing: Mainly grants by external donors

Institutions
- Decentralization to municipalities: In rural areas only, since 2002
- Water and sanitation regulator: None
- Responsibility for policy setting: Ministry of Lands, Environment, Forests, Water and Mines
- Sector law: n/a
- No. of urban service providers: One (WASAC)
- No. of rural service providers: 847 water systems

Water supply and sanitation in Rwanda is characterized by a clear government policy and significant donor support. In response to poor sustainability of rural water systems and poor service quality, in 2002 local government in the Northern Byumba Province contracted out service provision to the local private sector in a form of public–private partnership. Support for public-private partnerships became a government policy in 2004 and locally initiated public-private partnerships spread rapidly, covering 25% of rural water systems as of 2007.

In urban areas, the Water and Sanitation Corporation (WASAC) is in charge of water supply. In March 2015, the government signed a 27-year contract with a private company to invest $75 million in order to provide 40,000 cubic meters/day of bulk water from a wellfield next to the Nyabarongo River to the capital Kigali. It is the first contract of this type in Sub-Saharan Africa.

== Access ==
=== Level and trend ===
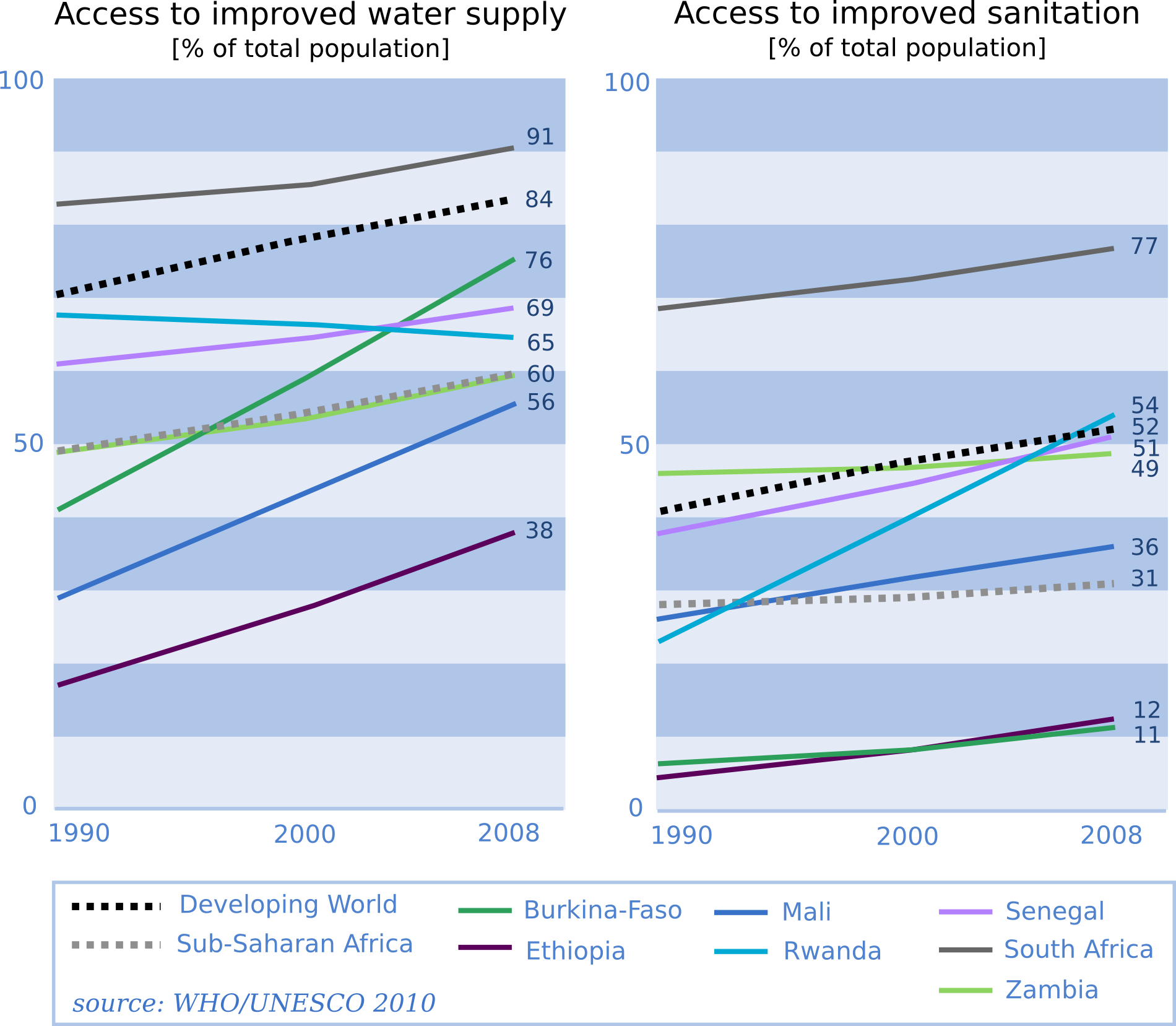
Access to improved water supply and sanitation, in 7 Sub-Saharan countries, from 1990 until 2008.

Figures on access to water and sanitation vary depending on the source of information, apparently in part because different definitions may have been used for access to an improved water source and improved sanitation. The fact that many rural water systems are not functioning properly makes it also difficult to estimate effective access to improved water supply.

The following table compares access to water supply according to various sources, highlighting the difficulty to obtain reliable data on the change in access to water supply because of different definitions used. The data appear to indicate that access decreased over time, while in the same period significant investments were undertaken in rural water supply. The government's 2002 Poverty Reduction Strategy Paper acknowledges that indeed "sustained access to potable water sources has probably declined in rural areas" since 1995. A main reason is poor maintenance and insufficient cost recovery, leading to the breakdown of systems shutting down water supply's, in particular those relying on pumping.

Table: Access to an improved source of water supply according to various sources

	Urban (19% of the population)	Rural (81% of the population)
2000 Multi-Indicator Survey	91%	67%
2002 Census	80%	67%
2005 Integral Household Living Conditions Survey	66%	57%

According to both the 2000 Multi-Indicator Survey and the 2000 Demographic and Health Survey, access to an improved source of water supply was 91% in urban areas and 67% in rural areas. According to the same source, access to adequate sanitation was 54% in urban areas and 37% in rural areas.

According to calculations based on data from the 2002 census, access to an improved source of water supply was 80% in urban areas and 67% in rural areas, including in the definition of improved source house connections, yard connections, public standposts, protected wells and protected springs. If figures were comparable, this would indicate a decline in access in urban areas and a stagnation in rural areas. The following map shows access to an improved source of water supply by districts and towns according to the 2002 census: Map of access to an improved source of water supply

According to the 2005 Integral Household Living Conditions Survey, however, 66% of the urban population and 57% of the rural population had access to an improved source of drinking water. With respect to adequate sanitation, access was estimated at only 10% in urban areas and 8% in rural areas.) If the figures were comparable, this would imply a massive decrease in access to water and sanitation in both urban and rural areas over the preceding five years.

However, according to a World Bank report, access to rural water supply in Rwanda increased from 41% in 2001 to 55% in 2005. The 2005 figure thus is roughly in line with the figures of the 2005 Integral Household Living Conditions Survey. According to the government, access to water supply in rural areas increased significantly in only two years from 57% in 2005 to 71% in 2007.

According to the 2008 Demographic and Health Survey 60% of the population had access to an improved water source, broken down by 73% in urban areas and 57% in rural areas. The JMP estimates based on one national survey conducted in 1992 and 12 national surveys conducted between 1998 and 2008 that access to an improved water source declined from 66% in 1995 to 65% in 2010. The decline was most marked in urban areas – from 91% to 76%.

The Joint Monitoring Programme for Water Supply and Sanitation of WHO and UNICEF estimated access to an improved water source in Uganda in 2011 at 71% and access to improved sanitation at 64%.

=== Impact of lack of access ===
Lack of access to water supply and sanitation has significant health impacts. In addition, it imposes a significant burden on women and girls who have to carry water. For instance, more than one in five households in Umutara is more than an hour away from its water source. This has implications for the quality of women's and girls' lives, their economic productivity and their access to education. Even where people statistically do have access to an improved water source such as a communal borehole that in some cases is shared by up to 175 families, they sometimes have to wait for more than four hours before they can get water.

=== Infrastructure ===
Water infrastructure in Rwanda consisted of 15 urban and about 796 rural water systems in 2002. Urban water systems are fed by water from 17 water treatment plants. Rural water systems feed mostly standpipes. Handpumps using groundwater and managed springs provide water separately from water systems.

Some rural water systems are large and complex. For example, in 2001 there were 50 water systems that spanned more than one district and 10 water systems that spanned more than one province. The largest one serves 120,000 users in villages several miles apart. Although these systems are "piped," this typically means that water is distributed to water points in the village where users must go to retrieve water.

Water Infrastructure

	Urban (16% of the population)	Rural (84% of the population)
Systems	15	796
Standpipes	286	7905
Private connections	22806	2461
Managed springs and handpumps	0	18299

Source: Poverty Reduction Strategy Paper 2002, p. 51 and p. 25, quoting the 2001 inventory of rural water supply systems

Despite favorable rainfall, little use is made of rainwater harvesting, except by a few health centers and churches.

Concerning sanitation, only about 15% of urban wastewater is collected through sewers. As far as sanitation in institutions is concerned, only 20% of primary schools in both rural and urban areas have latrines. The situation in secondary schools, prisons, health centers and markets is also poor.

== Service quality ==
About half of rural water schemes did not function in 2004 according to an extensive field survey.

== Water resources and water use ==
Rwanda has abundant rainfall and water resources, totalling 5 billion cubic metres (180×10^{9} cu ft) per year. However, deforestation and erosion affect the productivity of springs, which are the main source of water supply in rural areas.

Rwanda has 22,300 springs registered in a spring inventory. Total water use was estimated at 150 million cubic metres (5.3×10^{9} cu ft) in 2000, of which 24% (36 million cubic metres (1.3×10^{9} cu ft) per year) was for domestic uses, corresponding to only 4 cubic meters per capita per year or about 11 liters per capita per day (140 cu ft/capita/yr or about 3 U.S. gallons or 2½ imperial gallons/capita/day). Another source estimates total water use at 800 million cubic metres (28×10^{9} cu ft) per year in 1993, of which 5% (40 million cubic metres (1.4×10^{9} cu ft) per year) were for domestic uses.

== Development of the water sector ==
From 1990 to 1993 the country was engulfed in a Civil War, followed by a massive Genocide in 1994. The government had set itself the target to achieve universal access to water supply and sanitation by 2018. As described below, the water sector followed a different development pattern in rural and urban areas.

=== Rural areas ===
From 1950 to 1984 water in rural areas was provided free of charge to beneficiaries and infrastructure was owned by the national government. Beginning in 1984 the responsibility for rural service provision was transferred to communities. In 1987 a decree (Arrêté Présidentiel n°291/11 du 15 mai 1987) transferred ownership of rural water infrastructure to districts, well before the government enacted a comprehensive decentralization policy. Reconstruction activities after the 1994 genocide initially did not achieve a large increase in water supply and sanitation coverage, nor was there a sustainable management model for water systems in rural areas. Many users did not pay for water, some collected funds were mismanaged, and voluntary members of water committees in charge of operating and maintaining systems were often poorly motivated. As a result, about half of rural water schemes did not function in 2004 according to an extensive field survey. The adoption of a new sector policy based on a demand driven approach in 1997 did not change the situation much.

In 2000 the government began a process of decentralization, giving the country's 30 districts more revenues and decision-making authority. Districts, which were already nominally the owners of rural water infrastructure, now began to develop their capacity to plan and execute infrastructure projects. In 2002 local government in the Northern Byumba Province, inspired by similar experiences in neighboring Uganda, contracted out service provision to the local private sector in a form of public-private partnership. Following that local experience, the government eventually abandoned its policy of community management and decided in 2004 to promote local public-private partnerships following the "Byumba model". With the backing up of the national government, districts thus competitively bid out and signed contracts with private service providers throughout the country. In 2007, 140 rural piped water systems (25% of the total) were managed through public-private partnerships. Investments in rural water supply increased substantially since 2002, leading to an increase in access to water supply in rural areas from 57% in 2005 to 71% in 2007 according to government figures.

=== Urban areas ===
WASAC is a company that distributes water in Rwanda. As a national utility, the company has been in existence since 1976, as ELECTROGAZ. In 1939 the water, electricity and gas utility "REGIDESO" was established to supply water, electricity and gas to Rwanda-Urundi with its seat in Bujumbura. The company was later divided into REGIDESO Rwanda and REGIDESO Burundi in 1963. In 1976, REGIDESO Rwanda became the state-owned monopoly ELECTROGAZ. In 2003 the government signed a management contract with Lahmeyer International to manage and restructure ELECTROGAZ in collaboration with Hamburg Water Works for 5 years. In March 2006, the management contract was terminated and management of the company reverted to the Government of Rwanda. In 2009 Rwanda Water and Sanitation Corporation (RWASCO) was created, institutionally separating water supply and energy. However, only one year later it was absorbed into the Rwandan Energy Water and Sanitation Authority (EWSA). In 2008, RWASCO had signed a three-year agreement with the National Water and Sewerage Corporation (NWSC) of Uganda for performance improvement and to promote commercial service delivery. In 2014 the urban water sector was again separated from the energy sector, creating a water and sanitation utility, now called WASAC.

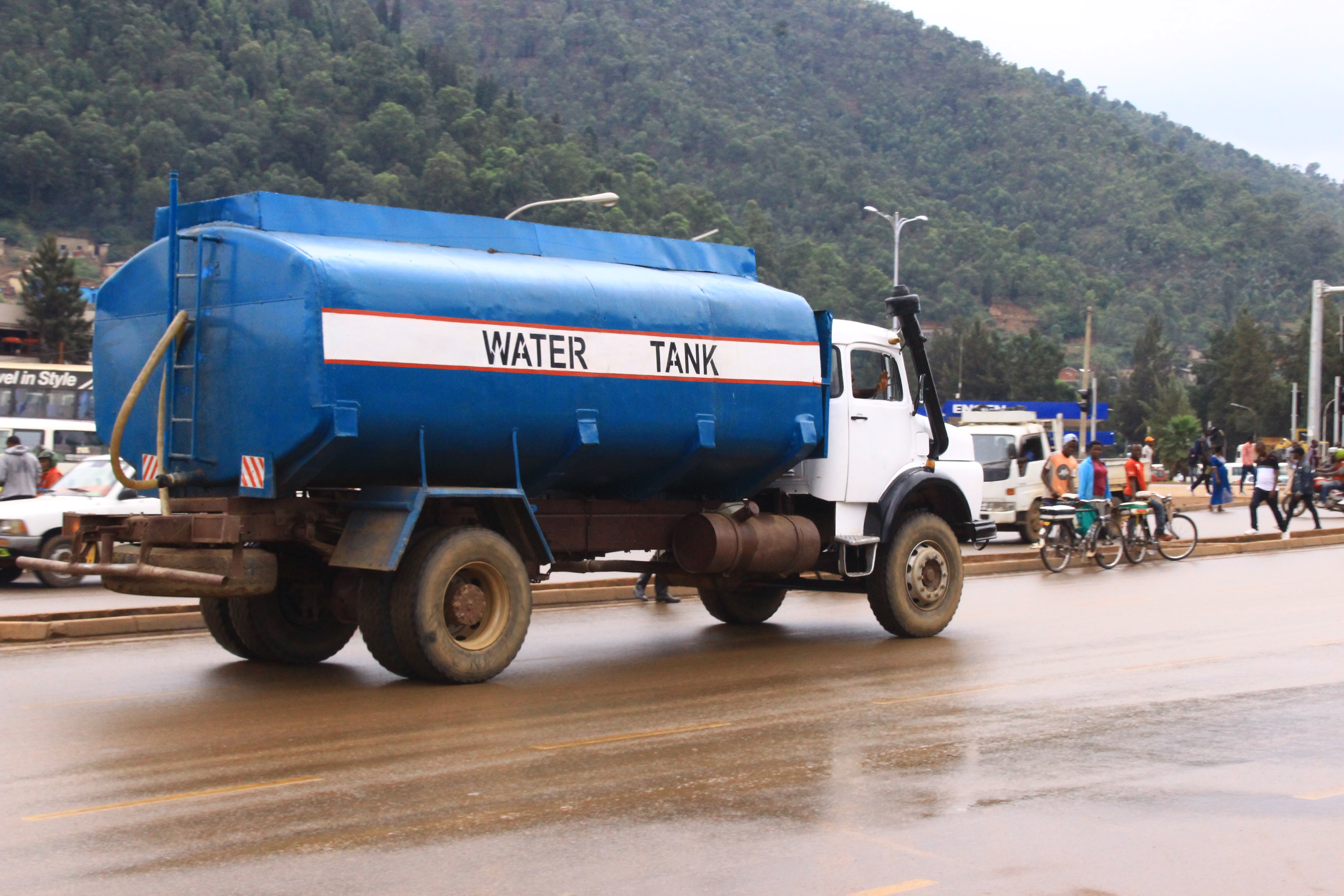
water tank transportation truck in Kigali

== Responsibility for water supply and sanitation ==
=== Policy, regulation and planning ===
The Ministry of Lands, Environment, Forests, Water and Mines (Ministère des Terres, de l'Environnement, des Forêts, de l'Eau et des Mines – Minister), through its water and sanitation directorate (Direction de l'eau et de l'assainissement), is in charge of determining water policies and strategies in Rwanda. It is also in charge of monitoring drinking water quality and promoting user awareness.

The Ministry of Infrastructure (Mininfra) is supporting districts in the construction of water supply systems, latrines and hygiene promotion with the support of UNICEF.

The Ministry of Local Government, Good Governance, Rural Development and Social Affairs (Minaloc) is in charge of accompanying local participatory planning processes, appying the government's Community Development Policy. Actual planning is carried out by Rwanda's 30 districts through District Development Plans which are elaborated using a participatory approach. The districts also own the water infrastructure.

The regulatory agency Rwanda Utilities Regulatory Agency (RURA), created by law in 2001, is responsible for the economic regulation of the telecommunications, electricity, water, sanitation, gas and transportation sectors. Its mission is to:

- Ensure that certain utilities provide goods and services throughout the country to meet in transparency all reasonable demands and needs of all natural persons and organizations;
- Ensure that all utility suppliers have adequate means to finance their activities;
- Continually promote the interest of users and potential users of the goods and services provided by utilities so that there is effective competition when competition is introduced in each utility sector and protection of users from abuses of monopoly positions is ensured because certain public utility sectors have a monopoly over the market.
- Facilitate and encourage private sector participation in investments in public utilities;
- Ensure compliance by public utilities with the laws governing their activities.

The purpose of the agency's water and sanitation department is to:

- regulate in a way that promotes fair competition, sustainable and efficient use of water resources;
- ensure better quality of services to customers at fair prices;
- ensure effective protection of environment by enforcing wastes disposal and by-products treatment regulations.

In practice, according to the agency's annual reports up to 2004, it seems that the regulatory agency focused much of its activities in the water and sanitation sector on the supervision of the management contract for Electrogaz (now EWSA).

=== Service provision ===
Urban areas. The Water and Sanitation Corporation (WASAC) is in charge of urban water supply and sanitation in Rwanda. Its predecessor EWSA had more than 118,000 water customers in 2013, up from only 38,500 in 2005.

Rural areas. There are 847 piped rural water systems in Rwanda and 19,300 protected springs. Most of the piped water systems are pumped systems, as opposed to gravity systems, since in Rwanda many settlements are at higher altitude than the water sources serving them. Many systems serve a large number of villages: The largest ones serve up to 120,000 people living in villages dozens of kilometers apart. Almost all users are served through water sales points where water is sold or given away for free by the bucket. House connections are rare in rural areas.

Services in rural areas are provided by community-based organizations (about 650 systems), by private operators under contract with district governments (about 140 systems) and privately owned systems (about 60), most of which were privately owned since at least 2000.

== Financial aspects ==
=== Tariffs ===
Standpost/Borne Fontaine operator in Gisagara district in the southern part of Rwanda selling to a business client

Rural areas. Water tariffs in rural areas are usually measured by jerrycan (bucket) for water sold at water kiosks or public standposts. In rural water systems managed by private operators in 2004 the water tariffs per jerrycan of 20 liters varied between 14 and 25 Rwandan Franc (RWF), equivalent to about 2.5 to 4.5 US cents per jerrycan or US$1.25 – 2.25 per cubic meter, according to the Utilities Regulatory Agency.

However, according to a World Bank report of 2008 tariffs range from only RWF 2.5 (gravity-fed systems) to RWF 15 (pumping systems) per jerrycan (equivalent to US$0.25 to US$1.40/m3). In addition, and to alleviate the financial burden for the poorest part of the rural population, the districts keep a list of vulnerable households (widows, poor single-parent households), who get free access to water points. These lists are drawn up by communities and approved by local authorities.

According to the World Bank, "the principle of paying water at standposts in accordance with the volume consumed has been widely accepted, as the water users acknowledged the improvements in service delivery. More than fifteen years of experience with administrative or community management of water services proved that free or unpaid water resulted in little water or no water at all."

For the few house connections the volumetric tariff is set at between RWF622 and RWF850 per m3 (US$1.13 and 1.55 per m3) according to the regulatory agency and at RWF185 to RWF600 per m3 according to the World Bank.

Urban areas. As of June 2013 the urban water tariff was RWF240 per m3 for the first five cubic meters per month and RWF300 per m3 for any consumption between 6 and 20 m3 per month. Higher tariffs are charged for higher consumption. Water at public kiosks is sold at RWF240 per m3.

=== Cost recovery ===
Cost recovery in rural water schemes has apparently improved in those schemes that are run as public-private partnerships, despite the fact that some poor users receive water for free. Private operators also pay a monthly rent to the districts for the right to use the systems, which remain publicly owned.

=== Investment ===
Level and composition. Investments in rural water supply and sanitation increased from US$3.5 million in 2002 to US$32 million in 2006.

Mechanism. Investments are channeled from donors and the national government to districts and communities through a Community Development Fund (CDF) established in 2001. 10% of tax revenues are allocated to the CDF by law, although actual transfers remained short of this target in 2003. In that year, 4 bn Rwandan Francs (RWF) were approved, but only 1 bn RWF were disbursed. The 30 Districts of Rwanda sign annual performance contracts with the President of the Republic about the construction of water facilities and the protection of catchment areas. A commission assesses progress on a quarterly basis.

=== Financing ===
A large share of investments is financed by donors, including by the World Bank. Communities contribute to the initial capital costs. In 2009 the World Bank's Water and Sanitation Program and the government of Rwanda completed a study of Rwanda's funding mechanisms for water and sanitation which found that "existing financing modalities are highly fragmented and not appropriate for consistent financing of an ambitious water sector program". A new financing option recommended by the study was awaiting government approval in October 2009. It proposes a pooled Water and Sanitation Fund that would handle both government and donor contributions through the same national procedures. Districts would submit projects based on their regular planning procedures while a unit managing the Fund would appraise and monitor the projects. The Fund would be established under a new water supply and sanitation authority.

== External cooperation ==
Donors in the Rwandan rural water sector follow a unified implementation framework which is based on the government's national strategy and program and medium-term expenditure framework. According to the Rwandan Development Gateway, in 2005 Rwanda's "achievements in establishing an aid coordination, harmonization, and alignment framework are being recognized as international best-practice." This is significant progress compared to the observation in the government's 2002 Poverty Reduction Strategy Paper, which had observed "a piecemeal and uncoordinated approach" among donors in the sector and had called for a sector-wide approach.

The World Bank supported rural water supply and sanitation through a series of projects, including the US$72.3 million water supply 02 project (1987–1998) and the US$20 million Rural Water and Sanitation Project (2000–2007). The latter has provided 352,000 people with access to improved water services by December 2006. At the same time more than 12 percent of the 830 water-piped systems existing in the country were privately managed. The World Bank rated the project highly satisfactory in its 2008 completion report.

In 2005 the European Union (EU) signed a contract with the Rwandan government for a major water project in the Bugesera Region (Kigali rural) worth 16 billion Rwandan francs (Euro 23.24 million). The water project will benefit the four districts of Kanzenze, Gashora, Bicumbi and Kanombe in the eastern part of Kigali city.

The African Development Bank has recently committed US$12 million to rural water supply and sanitation. The British and Belgian governments also support water supply and sanitation projects in Rwanda.

In 2009 the Government of the Netherlands has committed US$22 million for a Water for Sanitation and Hygiene (WASH) project to be implemented by UNICEF. The aim of the project is to increase the provision of water services and of sanitation facilities as well as to spread good hygiene practices. The project is implemented by four districts in the Northern Province with the support of the Ministry of Infrastructure. An evaluation of a previous US$5 million UNICEF project for Water and Environmental Sanitation (WES) implemented from 1997 to 2000 concluded that its goals had been too ambitious and its hygiene and environmental sanitation component yielded little impact. However, in the 66 municipalities were the project intervened it increased access to water supply and succeeded in strengthening community capacity for managing water systems.

== See also ==
- Karenge Drinking Water Supply System
- Water supply and sanitation in Sub-Saharan Africa
