= Katosi Water Works =

Water treatment project in Uganda

Katosi Water Treatment Plant
- Location within Uganda
- Interactive map of Katosi Water Treatment Plant
- Location: Katosi, Mukono District
- Coordinates: 00°07′02″N 32°46′37″E
- Estimated output: 160,000 cubic meters (160,000,000 L) of water daily
- Cost: €212 million
- Technology: Sedimentation, Chlorination
- Percent of water supply: Estimated 50% of Kampala Metropolitan Area
- Operation date: April 2021

Katosi Water Works (KWW), also Katosi Water Treatment Plant is a water purification and distribution project in Uganda.

== Location ==
The water treatment facility is located in the lakeside town of Katosi, in Ntenjeru subcounty, Mukono District, in the Buganda Region of Uganda. Katosi is approximately 23.5 kilometres (15 mi), by road, southeast of the town of Mukono, where the district headquarters are located. This is about 53 kilometres (33 mi), by road, south-east of Kampala, the capital city of Uganda. The geographical coordinates of the water treatment plant are: 00°07'02.0"N, 32°46'37.0"E (Latitude:0.117222; Longitude:32.776944).

== Overview ==
As far back as 2011, the Uganda government, through the National Water and Sewerage Corporation (NWSC), began to make plans to construct a new water treatment facility at Katosi, to augment the facilities at Ggaba (Ggaba I, II & III), to meet the needs of the rapidly expanding population of Kampala and surrounding districts.

GKW Consult GmbH, in association with Alliance Consultants Limited, were contracted by the NWSC to provide consulting services for the preparation of designs for the new Drinking Water Treatment Plant near Katosi. Tendering and supervision of the construction works, are part of this consulting contract. The design also includes the evacuation pipeline to a storage reservoir on Nsumba Hill, about 7 kilometres (4 mi), to the north-west.

When completed, the plant is expected to have initial capacity of 160,000 cubic meters (160,000,000 L) of water daily, expandable to 240,000 cubic meters (240,000,000 L) of water daily. The target population is the estimated 4.5 million people by the year 2025 and 7 million by the year 2040, expected to inhabit the city of Kampala, and its surrounding metropolis.

== Ownership ==
The water treatment facility is wholly owned by the National Water and Sewerage Corporation, a government parastatal company, responsible for provision of potable water and sewerage services nationwide.

== Construction ==
The construction of the Katosi Water Treatment Plant is part of a master plan called Kampala Water Lake Victoria Water and Sanitation Project, which was developed in 2011. The project involves improving water supply and improve sanitation services to all of the 2 million inhabitants of the city of Kampala at that time.

As part of that program, which also involved the improvement of the NWSC Ggaba Water Treatment Plant, called for the construction of a new 120,000 cubic meters (120,000,000 L) per day water treatment plant in Katosi, Mukono District, east of Kampala.

The feasibility study was conducted by BRL Ingenierie SA, IGIP and WE Consult. In June 2016, GKW Consult GmbH and Alliance Consultants Limited were selected as consulting engineers. Tenders for the construction contract were advertised in the first quarter of 2017, with bid evaluation expected in May 2017.

The contract was awarded to a consortium comprising Suez International of Egypt and Sogea-Satom of France. In June 2018, NWSC signed a binding contract with the consortium to design and build Katosi Water Works, together with the related intake, storage and transmission infrastructure at a contract price of €84 million (USh378 billion). Construction started in January 2019 and was expected to conclude in March 2021. As of May 2020, construction was estimated to have progressed to 80 percent. Test pumping was planned during the fourth quarter of 2020, with commissioning expected during the first quarter of 2021.

== Financing ==
The funding of the Kampala Water Lake Victoria Water and Sanitation Project (WATSAN), is as illustrated in the table below:

Kampala Water Lake Victoria Water and Sanitation Project Funding
Rank	Development Partner	Contribution in Euros	Percentage	Notes
1	Government of Uganda	34.0 million	16.04	Investment
2	KfW of Germany	20.0 million	9.44	Grant
3	European Investment Bank	75.0 million	35.38	Loan
4	French Development Agency	75.0 million	35.38	Loan
5	European Union Infrastructure Trust Fund	8.0 million	3.77	Grant
	Total	212.00 million	100.00	

- Note: Totals are slightly off due to rounding.

In February 2019, an agreement was signed between the French Development Agency (AFD), represented by Stéphanie Rivoal, the French Ambassador to Uganda and the government of Uganda, represented by Matia Kasaija, the Ugandan Finance Minister for a 20-year USh630 billion (€150 million) loan, representing the EIB's and AFD's funding participation in this project.

== Powering the plant ==
In August 2020, Umeme, the largest electricity distribution utility in Uganda, announced that it was constructing a dedicated double circuit 33kV power line from its substation in Mbalala (not Mbarara), along the Kampala–Jinja Highway, to supply stable power to the water treatment plant. The power line is expected to be completed in December 2020.

== Recent events ==
In April 2021, with the construction approximately 95 percent complete, the contractors and NWSC engineers started testing the electrical-mechanical systems of the new plant. These included the various electrical control units, pressure gauges, the intake and output pipes, landscaping and staff housing. Commissioning of the completed system was expected in the fourth week of April 2021.

In September 2021, Uganda's Minister of Water and Environment, Sam Cheptoris, the chairman of National Water and Sewerage Corporation (NWSC), Engineer Badru Kiggundu and the CEO of NWSC, Doctor Silver Mugisha, toured the complete water treatment plant. The infrastructure includes the purification plant in Katosi, the storage reservoirs on Nsumba Hill and Sonde Hill, in Mukono District and a booster pump at Namugongo, in Wakiso District. A total of 51 kilometres (32 mi) of water piping connects the Katosi Water Treatment Plant to Ntinda, a neighborhood in the city of Kampala, where the treated water joins the NWSC water network in Metropolitan Kampala comprising Kampala City, Mukono District and Wakiso District.

== See also ==
- Ministry of Water and Environment (Uganda)
- Kinshasa Industrial Water Treatment Complex
- Karenge Drinking Water Supply System
