= Sudi Nangoli =

- Born: Uganda
- Education: Moi University
- Occupations: Academic, business executive
- Employer: Uganda Printing and Publishing Corporation
- Known for: Managing Director of the Uganda Printing and Publishing Corporation
- Title: Managing Director
- Awards: Presidential Award (2025)

Sudi Nangoli is a Ugandan academic, business executive, and business management specialist who serves as the managing director of the Uganda Printing and Publishing Corporation (UPPC).

== Early life and education ==
Nangoli holds a PhD in business management from Moi University in Kenya and a Master of Business Administration (MBA) in Project Management.

== Career ==
Nangoli started his career as a Senior Lecturer and member of the Management Committee at MUBS and also served as Deputy Dean of the Faculty of Business Administration before serving as the Dean and Programme Controller of the Faculty of Management Sciences at Busitema University.

He later served as the Dean of the Faculty of Management Sciences at Busitema University and was a board member of the Busitema University Fund Company. In July 2023, Nangoli was appointed as the managing director of Uganda Printing and Publishing Corporation, replacing Kenneth Oluka, who had been serving in an acting capacity.

== Recognition ==
In May 2025, Nangoli received a Presidential Award during Uganda's International Labour Day celebrations.

== See also ==
- Emmanuel Iyamulemye
- Joachim Buwembo
- Christopher Kasozi
- Patrick Ayota
