= Christopher Kasozi =

Ugandan engineer

- Born: 17 January 1930 (age 96); Kyaggwe, Uganda
- Citizenship: Uganda
- Education: King's College Buddo; University of Kerala
- Occupations: Engineer and Managing director
- Years active: 1930 – 2020
- Known for: Engineering
- Spouse: Namukasa Mary Grace (m. 1961)

Christopher Kasozi also known as Christopher Fredrick Kasozi Kaya (born January 17,1930) was a Ugandan engineer and managing director of the National Water and Sewerage Corporation when it was formed in 1973.

== Early life and educational background ==
Kasozi was born on January 17, 1930 to Yonasani Namutayika Kaya and Bulanina Nankya, who resided in Katoogo, Kyaggwe County. At the age of six, he was taken to Kampala, where he grew up in Wakaliga under the care of his relative, Nakanwagi, who earned a living by selling locally brewed alcohol.

Christopher Fredrick Kasozi Kaya attended Mackay Primary School in Nateete, where he got his pocket money by roasting and selling groundnuts. In 1945, he enrolled at Aggrey Memorial Secondary School. He was also a member of the choir at Namirembe Cathedral, where his singing talent brought him to the attention of Bishop Stuart, who later secured for him a scholarship to study at King’s College Budo.

Kasozi after completing his studies at King’s College Buddo in 1951, returned to Aggrey Memorial Secondary School as a mathematics teacher. While there, he applied for an Indian scholarship to study engineering and, in 1954, was admitted to Trivandrum University (now the University of Kerala) in India, where he spent about six years training in engineering. He also later earned a degree in civil engineering from Makerere University.

== Career ==
After returning to Uganda from his engineering studies in India, Kasozi worked with Shell Uganda as an engineering supervisor early in his career. In 1965, he was appointed as the Engineer Manager of the Kampala and District Water Board, the organization that later evolved into the National Water and Sewerage Corporation.

Kasozi later served as the Managing Director of the National Water and Sewerage Corporation when it was established in 1973. He also held the position of chairman of the Uganda Institute of Professional Engineers.

== Affiliations ==
Kasozi served as a member of the Board of Governors for Mengo Hospital. He was also a fellow of the Economic Development Institute of the International Bank for Reconstruction and Development and a fellow of the Uganda Institute of Professional Engineers.

== Death ==
Kasozi passed away on 26 August, 2020, due to complications related to diabetes and high blood pressure. He was laid to rest at his marital home, Sierra Leone Villa in Kanyanya, on August 29, 2020.

== Personal life ==
Kasozi married Namukasa Mary Grace, who was a teacher at Nalinya Lwantare High School in Ndejje and wedded on 16 December, 1961. Together, they had six children: Paul Sebirumbi, Peter Segujja, Eva Nabawanda Semakula, Patrick Sebanwagi, Philip Seruwagi, and Phares Sekalala.

== See also ==
- National Water and Sewerage Corporation
- Badru Kiggundu
- Silver Mugisha
