= Failures of water supply and sanitation systems =

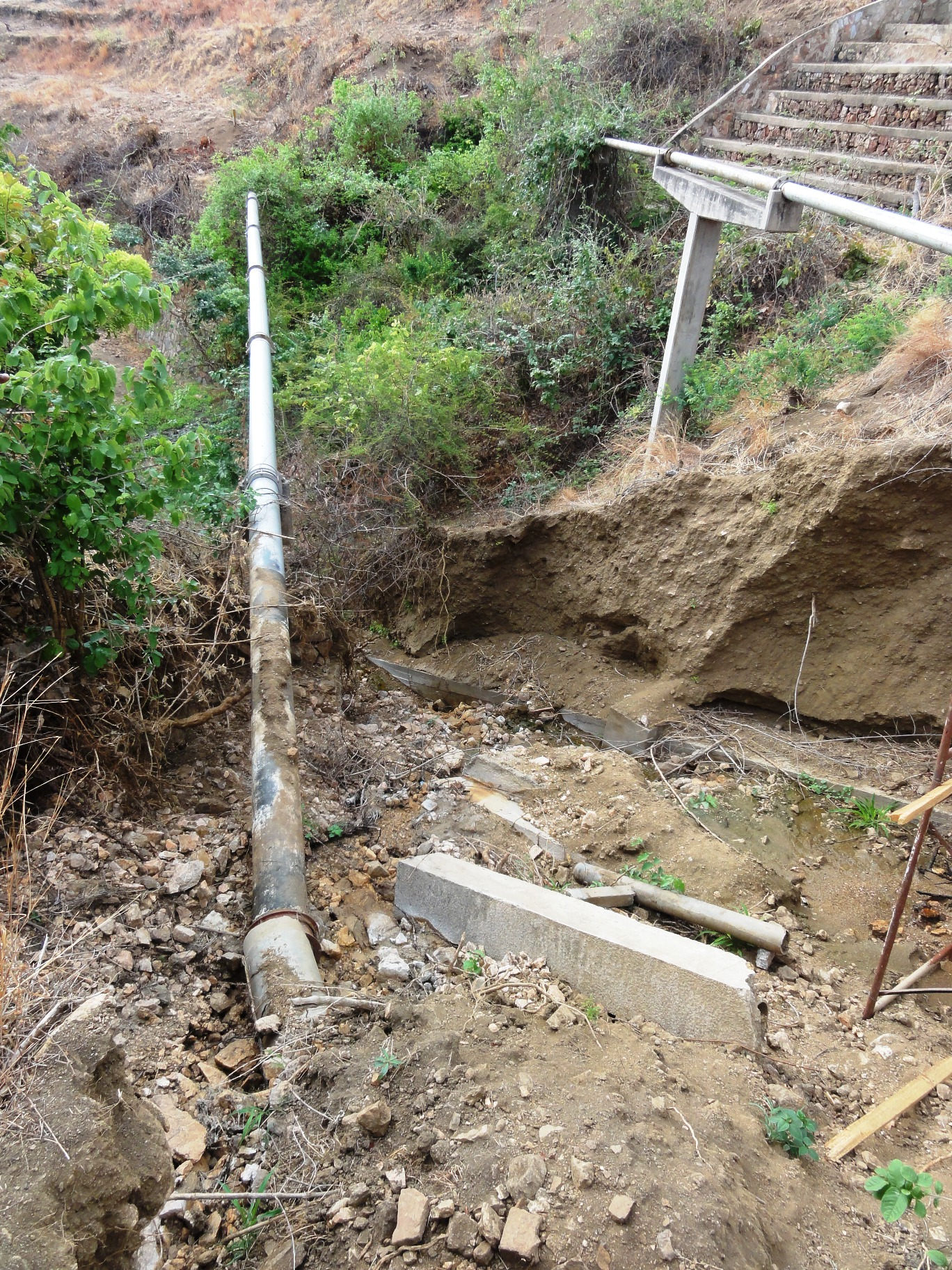
Destroyed water supply pipes in Kariba, Zimbabwe

Failures of water supply and sanitation systems describe situations where water supply and sanitation systems (also called WASH systems) have been put in place (for example by the government or by non-government organizations (NGOs) but have failed to meet the expected outcomes. Low resource settings are scattered with the artifacts of WASH projects - include tanks, taps, toilets and pipes - from the period when WASH was predominantly considered a problem of infrastructure, engineering and technology. These failures not only represent a massive loss of investment of donor and community members' resources, their creation persists, with non-functionality of water systems remaining at 30%–40%.

This level of failure represents a total investment of between USD 1.2 and USD 1.5 billion in the last 20 years (as of 2010).

These failures often due to poor planning, lack of choice of appropriate technology depending upon the context, insufficient stakeholder involvement at the various stages of the project, and/or lack of maintenance. Some argue they are due in part to a lack of accountability for these failures.

While Hygiene Behavior Change is important in achieving the health benefits of improved WASH systems, the achievement of sustainability of WASH infrastructure depends on the creation of demand for sanitation services.

National government mapping and monitoring efforts as well as post-project monitoring by NGOs or researchers, have identified the failure of water supply systems (also known as water points, wells, boreholes, or similar) and sanitation systems (one part of sanitation systems are the toilets). The following sections provide examples of those failures sorted by country.

== Improved Sources Don't Guarantee Water Quality ==
A review of 319 studies reporting on the quality of 96,737 water samples found that overall, the chance of contamination were considerably lower for "improved" sources than "unimproved" sources. However, in 38% of 191 studies, over a quarter of samples from improved sources contained fecal contamination. In particular, samples from protected dug wells often contained fecal contamination. The researchers also found that water sources in low-income countries and rural areas were more likely to be contaminated. These researchers concluded that access to an "improved source" does not ensure water is free of fecal contamination. "International estimates therefore greatly overstate use of safe drinking-water and do not fully reflect disparities in access."

For example, a national sampling of drinking water points in Ethiopia found that 28% were not in compliance with the WHO guideline value for fecal contamination nor the Ethiopian drinking-water standard ES 261:2001. Non-compliance ranged from 57% for protected springs to 12% for utility piped supplies. In 135 Ugandan households, 86% of initially clean water samples contained E. coli after 24 hours of storage in jerrycans.

== Monitoring ==
Some national and local governments monitor water services regularly. One example is the Sistema de Información de Agua y Saneamiento Rural (Rural Water and Sanitation Information System) a monitoring system in Honduras and Nicaragua.

For organizations that work on WASH interventions, monitoring means using indicators to measure effectiveness of a development program. Some organizations or research organizations do "post-implementation monitoring", which occurs after the WASH intervention has been completed.

The Water Point Data Exchange (WPDx), launched in 2015, is a global platform for sharing water point data collected by governments, non-profit organizations, researchers, and others.

== Failures of water supply systems ==
=== Afghanistan ===
- 36% of 24,504 handpumps were found to be non-functional in 2013-2014.
- During a WaterAid-IRC-RWSN webinar in 2011, Leendert Vijselaar of DACAAR said that 35% of 30,182 water points surveyed were non-functional.
- Nationally, 45% of water supply systems in public schools need extensive repair or replacement (2010).

=== Africa / Sub-Saharan Africa ===
- A 2013 survey of 23 European Community-funded projects in six sub-Saharan countries found:
  - Overall, equipment was installed as planned and was in working order. However, fewer than half of the projects examined delivered results meeting the beneficiaries' needs.
  - While the projects examined were sustainable in technical terms, for a majority of projects, results and benefits will not continue to flow in the medium and long term unless non-tariff revenue is ensured; or because of institutional weaknesses (weak capacity by operators to run the equipment installed).
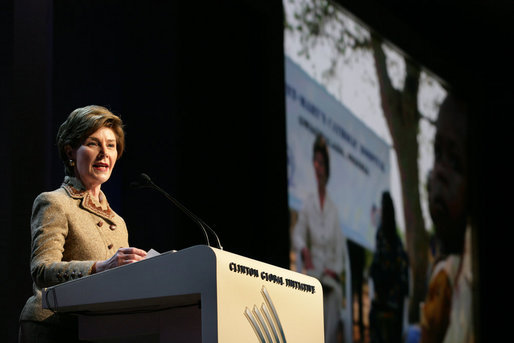
- US First Lady Laura Bush announces partnership with Case Foundation on PlayPumps
  The PlayPump, which was endorsed by celebrities and US First Lady Laura Bush and former US President Bill Clinton, fell out of favor. Many were uninstalled. Critiques included that it was too expensive, too hard to maintain, and used child labor. A UNICEF report called the organization's work technology-driven and recommended meaningful community engagement and transparency on the use of funds.
- RWSN (Rural Water Supply Network) estimated in 2010 that only two out of three handpumps are working at any time.
- Figures collated by the RWSN in 2007 indicate an average rate of 36% non-functionality for hand pumps across 21 countries. This level of failure represents a total investment of between $1.2 and $1.5 billion in the last 20 years.
- Almost 40% of sub-Saharan handpumps are not working in 2005.
- Sutton (2004) compiled data on non-functionality for several countries.

=== Angola ===
- 25% of 4,389 handpumps were found to be non-functional in 2015

=== Bangladesh ===
- 9% of 1,656,695 handpumps were found to be non-functional in 2017.
- Among 972,865 existing water options for arsenic mitigation, 29% are not active (2009).

=== Belarus ===
- 14.5% of rural water supply systems do not meet microbial quality standards and 30.1% do not meet chemical standards (2011).

=== Benin ===
- 12% of 13,003 handpumps were found to be non-functional in 2016

=== Bolivia ===
- In over 100 communities visited in the rural municipality of Tiraque, fewer than ten had no water system, 17 were functioning per Bolivia government norms, and the rest were providing sub-par services, requiring anywhere from complete rehabilitations to minor repairs to ensure water of adequate quantity, quality, and continuity was being provided to all citizens (2007).

=== Burkina Faso ===
- 11% of 52,596 handpumps were found to be non-functional in 2017

=== Burundi ===
- 58% of 229 handpumps were found to be non-functional in 2012

=== Cambodia ===
- In 2014 SNV Cambodia found these results after surveying 1008 water points in Chum Kiri District: 12.1% of 672 tubewells were not functional, 5.8% of 13 protected dug wells were not functional, 262 unprotected dug wells, and 1.1% of 94 community ponds were not functional.
- 7% of 136,722 handpumps were found to be non-functional.

=== Cameroon ===
- 32% of 6,899 handpumps were found to be non-functional from 2011-2015

=== Central African Republic ===
- 25% of 3,177 handpumps were found to be non-functional in 2003
- Only 10% of the wells and boreholes provide safe water despite these being the main source of water for urban dwellers (2011).

=== Chad ===
- 16% of 3,267 handpumps were found to be non-functional in 2000

=== Congo ===
- 50% of 159 handpumps were found to be non-functional in 2008

=== Côte d'Ivoire ===
- 30% of 22,807 handpumps were found to be non-functional in 2016

=== Croatia ===
- 70% customers of 443 small water supply systems receive water that is not in compliance with the respective quality standards (2008).

=== Czech Republic ===
- Water quality data from approximately 1700 small public groundwater well supplies and 3300 private wells from the period 1991–1998 showed there was a non-compliance rate with health-related parameters of approximately 70%.

=== Dominican Republic ===
- A 2011 sustainability assessment of 61 rural water systems found that 18% are unlikely to be sustainable (it is unlikely the community will be able to overcome significant challenges).

=== DR Congo ===
- Out of 2,051 water points in three provinces – Bas Congo, Equateur and Kinshasa – non-functionality was highest in Bas Congo at 68%, 24% in Kinshasa and 14% in Equateur. In Bas Congo only 39% of functional water points provided safe drinking water while in Kinshasa it was just 32% (2012).
- 25% of 2,214 handpumps were found to be non-functional in 2011

=== Ecuador ===
- A sustainability study conducted by the Secretariat for Water in 2004 found that 13% of the systems were sustainable, 29% had mild problems, 20% had severe problems, and 38% were broken down.

=== England & Wales ===
- An analysis of data collected from 150 local water authorities covering approximately 35,000 microbial water quality results for approximately 11,200 private water supply sites from 1996 to 2003 showed that E. coli (an indicator of fecal contamination) was detected in 19% of samples, with at least one positive sample being detected at 32% of water supply sites (compared to 0.1% of samples from mains water supplies).

=== Eritrea ===
- 43% of 864 handpumps were found to be non-functional in 2006

=== Eswatini (formerly Swaziland) ===
- 28% of 801 handpumps were found to be non-functional in 2013-2015.
- A 2012 pilot water point mapping effort in 8 Tinkhundlas (sub-districts) beginning Nov 2010 showed that out of 2,689 water points, 58.6% are functional, 11.5% are partially functional, and 29.9% are non-functional.
- 22.9% (national) and 27.9% (Lubombo region, the study area) of the water schemes were non-functional (2005).

=== Ethiopia ===
- 33% of 4,620 handpumps were found to be non-functional from 2011-2014
- A 2013 survey from the 57 diverse water schemes showed 38.6% were non-functional on the day of the visit.
- A 2012 survey was carried out with 160 household in 16 water supply systems constructed by different organizations. In Mecha Woreda, 20 of the 21 systems (95%) installed without community support were not functioning while only 12 of the 142 systems (8%) installed with community failed.
- 25.5% of more than 93,000 water schemes across the country were non-functional according to the National Water Inventory (2011).
- Of 91 water schemes in Farta and West Estie surveyed, 17.5% were not functioning and 10% were functioning with difficulties (2011).
- Non-functionality of rural water schemes in 10 regions ranges from 18% to 35%, with a national average of 20% (2010).
- Out of the 70 water supply schemes in Mirab Abaya Woreda, 30 (43%) were non-functional (2008).
- It has been estimated that 33% of rural water supply schemes are non-functional at any time (2007).
- 60% of the Somali region's birkado (cement-lined underground cisterns) are damaged and unused, calling into question the building of new birkado versus rehabilitating existing structures (2007).
- A 2006 survey found that 29% of handpumps and 33% of mechanized boreholes in rural areas were not functioning because of maintenance problems.

=== Gabon ===
- 47% of 1,158 handpumps were found to be non-functional in 2012

=== Germany ===
- In Baden-Württemberg, 523 samples from approximately 13,500 private wells were analyzed in 2007; non-compliance rates for E. coli (an indicator of fecal contamination) and total coliforms were at 18% and 43%, respectively.

=== Ghana ===
- 26% of 20,365 handpumps were found to be non-functional in 2014
- Of 898 wells surveyed, 20% were not operational at the time of a University of North Carolina study in 2014.
- Ampadu-Boakye and Hebert stated in 2014: "The Atebubu Water System, in the Brong Ahafo Region, served a group of eight urban communities with a total population of 32,000. The system was completely non-functional at the time of our visit—sand filters were overgrown with weeds, standpipes had been shut down, and the chlorinator appeared run down." Because of the failure, "Many residents now obtain water from boreholes installed by the district assembly or by NGOs....However, at the time of our visit some 40% were broken."
- 21% of 1,509 water points were not functioning on the day of visit (2013).
- In three districts (East Gonja, Akatsi, Sunyani West), more than 30% of the surveyed infrastructure was not functional, and as little as 2% was providing the basic level of service for which it was intended (2012).
- By the late 1980s and early 1990s, 33% of the water supply systems had deteriorated greatly or completely broken down due to inadequate funding to carry out maintenance and rehabilitation (1990).

=== Guinea ===
- 18% of 12,815 handpumps were found to be non-functional in 2012

=== Guinea-Bissau ===
- 36% of 703 handpumps were found to be non-functional in 2016

=== Haiti ===
- A 2012 survey of 1096 water kiosks and 2,266 water fountains showed that more than half of existing water kiosks are out of service in four geographical departments: Nord (63%), Sud (60%), Grand'Anse (59%) and Artibonite (53%) and 41.6% of existing water fountains inventoried are not functional.
- In Port-de-Paix there were no functioning public water sources in the city and 14 of 19 different sites throughout the city that investigators tested for water quality were bacterially contaminated (2007).

=== India ===
- 6% of 5,723,533 handpumps were found to be non-functional in 2013-2017.
- Of 2500 households in 80 villages across the country, 53% do not receive an acceptable level of service (2015).
- In2009, India's Ministry of Drinking Water and Sanitation reported 4,155,000 handpumps, with 11.8% non-functional (MDWS, 2009).
- 25% of India's water infrastructure is believed to be in need of repair (2004).
- Evaluation in 1989 of a representative sample of 10 water points found that consumers are not receiving protected water of the required quality in any scheme evaluated.
- UNICEF assisted the Government of India with water access by drilling thousands of wells starting in 1967 when a severe drought hit several states in India. Approximately 75% of the installed cast iron pumps were not working in 1974, just seven years later.

=== Kenya ===
- In Nairobi's Kibera slum, a public restroom project was supposed to improve sanitation. When it failed, entrepreneurial residents rented them as churches. The government built dozens of public toilet facilities in 2014 to improve sanitation in Kibera. But the facilities lacked adequate sewage systems and access to water. Youth groups, meant to manage these facilities for income, lacked sufficient resources to address repair and equipment issues that arose soon after construction.
- 24% of 2,580 handpumps were found to be non-functional in 2013
- 2010 pilot mapping showed that, of 1011 'improved' water points (all source types), average rates of non-functionality were 28% (West Pokot), 32% (Kyuso), and 20% (Mbeere North).
- Of 100 water systems assessed (built between 2006 and 2010), 75% are still in use. 45% are affected by minor technical issues, or even serious damages, although they have the potential to be remediated. 14% of the systems are non-functional.
- Only 58% of rural water sources are functional (2009).
- In western Kenya, nearly 50% of borehole wells dug in the 1980s, and subsequently maintained using a community-based maintenance model, had fallen into disrepair by 2000.

=== Kiribati ===
- 81% of 187 handpumps were found to be non-functional in 2003.

=== Laos ===
- 35% of 720 handpumps were found to be non-functional in 2015.

=== Liberia ===
- 20% of 12,684 handpumps were found to be non-functional in 2017
- 40% of over 10,000 improved water points mapped nationally were failed or needed repair (2011).
- The first systematic sampling of water points and study of water quality from 2011 in Monrovia found that 57% of the water points were contaminated by E. coli, which is an indicator of widespread fecal contamination.
  - 100% of the unprotected hand-dug wells sampled showed the presence of E. coli.
  - 75% of the kiosks sampled showed the presence of E. coli.
  - 67% of the LWSC city water taps sampled showed the presence of E. coli.
  - 52% of the protected hand-dug open wells fitted with hand pumps showed the presence of E. coli.
  - 44% of the drilled wells fitted with hand pumps showed the presence of E. coli.

=== Macedonia ===
- Local piped water supply systems, used by 54% of the rural population, had a bacteriological failure rate of 23%. Local (non-piped) water sources, used by 13% of the population had a bacteriological failure rate of 30% (2007).

=== Madagascar ===
- 20% of 15,068 handpumps were found to be non-functional in 2018
- 27% of water systems were not functional on the day of a survey which was published 2014. Out of 186 communities visited, "nearly half of all systems broke down in the previous year, and a third of them were reported not to have been fixed satisfactorily. So, by implication, one sixth of all rural water systems breaks down and are not properly fixed, per year. While half of all systems were reported to be functional for the most recent year, a tenth didn't work at all; systems worked for an average of nine months per year. Note that the survey sample was of systems that had been built or rehabilitated within the last five years. So, at any one time, around a quarter of the rural population of Madagascar has no safe water."
- Functionality of existing water points is 90% for boreholes according to a 2009 RWSN report; 20% according to a 2010 baseline survey of the USAID-funded RANO HamPivoatra Project. Actual functionality rate is likely between 40 and 50% nationally.

=== Malawi ===
- In a 2013 survey of 48 villages, 66% of Malda handpumps installed one year before the visit were recorded as being non-functional. A Malda handpump is a corrosion-resistant device that uses a buoyant rod to reduce the force needed to pump water. Its simple installation and maintenance are intended to make it easy for communities to manage. "[T]he proportion of fully functional MALDAs was between 29% and 50% in all age cohorts."
- A survey of the water schemes in the early 1980s showed over 90% of taps were functioning, but now (2011) only 42.4% are functioning: in the Northern Region, 74% of 2305 taps from gravity-fed piped water schemes are non-functional; in the Central (1,465 taps) and Southern Regions (10,215 taps), 55% of the taps from piped water systems are non-functional.
- 31% of the improved rural water points are not functioning (2008).
- 22% of 24,769 handpumps were found to be non-functional in 2007
- 49% of all gravity flow system taps were not working (2007).
- In 1997, a survey of almost 900 tap stands found that more than 50% of them were not supplying water. This indicated a significant decline since the early 1980s when surveys showed fewer than 10% not functioning.

=== Mali ===
- 29% of 19,951 handpumps were found to be non-functional in 2015-2016.
- In four municipalities, non-functionality of "modern" water points ranged from 14 to 41% (2011).

=== Mauritania ===
- 54% of 71 handpumps were found to be non-functional in 2012

=== Mozambique ===
- 20% of 12,180 handpumps were found to be non-functional in 2011-2012
- The percent of non-functioning water points remains around 20% (2008).

=== Multiple countries ===
- Data for 126,251 water points across 37 countries that are being monitored with Akvo FLOW in 2015 show that 20% are not functional, and 10% are functional but have problems.

=== Namibia ===
- 54% of 94 handpumps were found to be non-functional in 2000

=== Nepal ===
- The National Management Information Project (2013) shows that of 40,000 gravity flow schemes, 82% are not fully functional.
- Of a sample of 192 water points across the country, 26% were found to be non-functional (2012).
- In 2010 Nepal Functionality Thematic Working Group found that out of 38,000 gravity flow water supply systems, about half are partly or totally defunct.
- A 2008 national survey of households in 36,038 wards found only 18% of the population with a water supply are served by well functioning water points/ systems; 39% are served by points that need minor repair, 12% by points that need major repair, 21% by points that need rehabilitation, 9% by points that need reconstruction, and 1.6% by points that cannot be rehabilitated.

=== Niger ===
- 15% of 10,072 handpumps were found to be non-functional in 2015

=== Nigeria ===
- 42% of 25,470 handpumps were found to be non-functional in 2006
- About 80% of all government owned water systems in small towns are non-operational (2000).

=== Pakistan ===
- In public schools nationally, 39% of the water supply systems need extensive repair or replacement (2010).
- A 2009 study of Asian Development Bank Independent Evaluation Group's assistance to rural water supply in the Punjab Province identified, among others, these major concerns:
  - 20% of the subprojects are nonfunctional
  - only 43% of community based organizations responsible for subprojects are functional and their capacity remains weak.

=== Peru ===
- In Loreto Region, it is estimated that 34% of water systems do not function (2004).
- In a 2003 study of 104 rural water systems, only 32% were deemed "sustainable"; 66% were deteriorated and 2% were broken down.
- A 2001 study by the National Water and Sanitation Programme revealed only 34.7% of rural water supply systems in rural areas was in good or fair condition.

=== Philippines ===
- 10% of 10,743 handpumps were found to be non-functional in 2014.

=== Rwanda ===
- In a 2011 baseline survey of 126 water points in the District of Kicukiro, 50% of the water points had been down for more than 1 day in the last month, and 55% of the communities reported that they had no spare parts on hand for the water system.
- 16% of 279 handpumps were found to be non-functional in 2008-9
- An estimated one-third of the rural water infrastructure requires urgent rehabilitation (2006).

=== Scotland ===
- Out of 1750 samples taken from private water supplies in Scotland between 1992 and 1998, 41% failed compliance for total coliforms, 30% failed for E. coli and 15% failed for nitrate. The combined failure rate was 48%.

=== Senegal ===
- 22% of 2,903 handpumps were found to be non-functional in 2014

=== Sierra Leone ===
- 25% of 11,895 handpumps were found to be non-functional in 2016
- A comprehensive water point mapping exercise (28,845 water points) in 2012 showed the rate of damage of public water points is high and rises rapidly with point age: 14.4% were functional but partly damaged, and 17.8% are broken down. Furthermore, up to 40% of protected in-use points providing insufficient water during the dry season.
- A 2010 survey of all existing water access points across three districts (2,859 structures) found only 30% of the structures in place were found to be capable of delivering access to safe water throughout the year.

=== South Africa ===
- In a sample of water and sanitation projects conducted by CSIR in 2007 in all nine provinces, the compliance level for 1067 completed household water projects was only 2.6% – more than 97% of the projects did not comply with policy requirements, norms and standards. The compliance level for 517 completed household sanitation projects was 0% – that is, none of the completed household sanitation projects complied with policy requirements, norms and standards.
- 27% of 11,735 handpumps were found to be non-functional in 2000
- At any time, approximately 50% of handpumps are not working (2000).

=== South Asia ===
- The 2004 World Development Report estimates that more than one-third of existing rural water infrastructure is not functional. (World Bank, 2004).

=== South Sudan ===
- 400 of 578 boreholes built between 2006 and 2012 under the Basic Services Fund were surveyed. 23.2% of surveyed boreholes were not fully functional. The main reasons for reduced functionality were difficulties with pumping and an objectionable taste or color. The 31% of the boreholes for which no information was received were mainly the inaccessible boreholes, or the boreholes constructed by NGOs that had withdrawn from the area. These may also have been the boreholes with a higher occurrence of breakdowns or reduced functionality.
- 20% of 4,951 handpumps were found to be non-functional in 2009.
- The Water Policy indicated in 2007 that 30–50% of the water points are non-operational at any time in the different States.

=== Sudan ===
- 35% of 7,933 handpumps were found to be non-functional in 2009-2010.

=== Tanzania ===
- National mapping shows 38% of 74,331 water points are not functional, and 7% are functional but need repair (2013).
- 33% of 22,021 handpumps were found to be non-functional in 2011-2013.
- A 2013 survey of 43 taps and 4 cattle troughs showed that 11% were not functional on the day of the visit.
- One in four public kiosks were not functional at the time of an interview of 324 residents of Dar es Salaam (2012).
- According to WaterAid (2009):
  - Nearly half (46%) of 65,000 public improved water points in rural areas are not functioning.
  - Two years after installation, already 25% of public improved water points are non-functional.
  - Up to 7.5 million rural Tanzanians lack access to clean and safe water due to functionality problems.
- Mapping 55 of the 132 district showed that 43% of the water points were no longer working, and that 25% of the water schemes had become non-functional within two years of installation (2008).

=== Timor-Leste ===
- 47% of 99 handpumps were found to be non-functional in 2007-2008.
- A 2008 assessment of all (134) rural water supply systems in Covalima district found: of 54 piped systems, 44% were fully functional, 30% partially functional, and 26% not functioning. Of the 80 hand pumps, 11 were under construction, 41% of completed systems were fully functional and 59% not functioning.

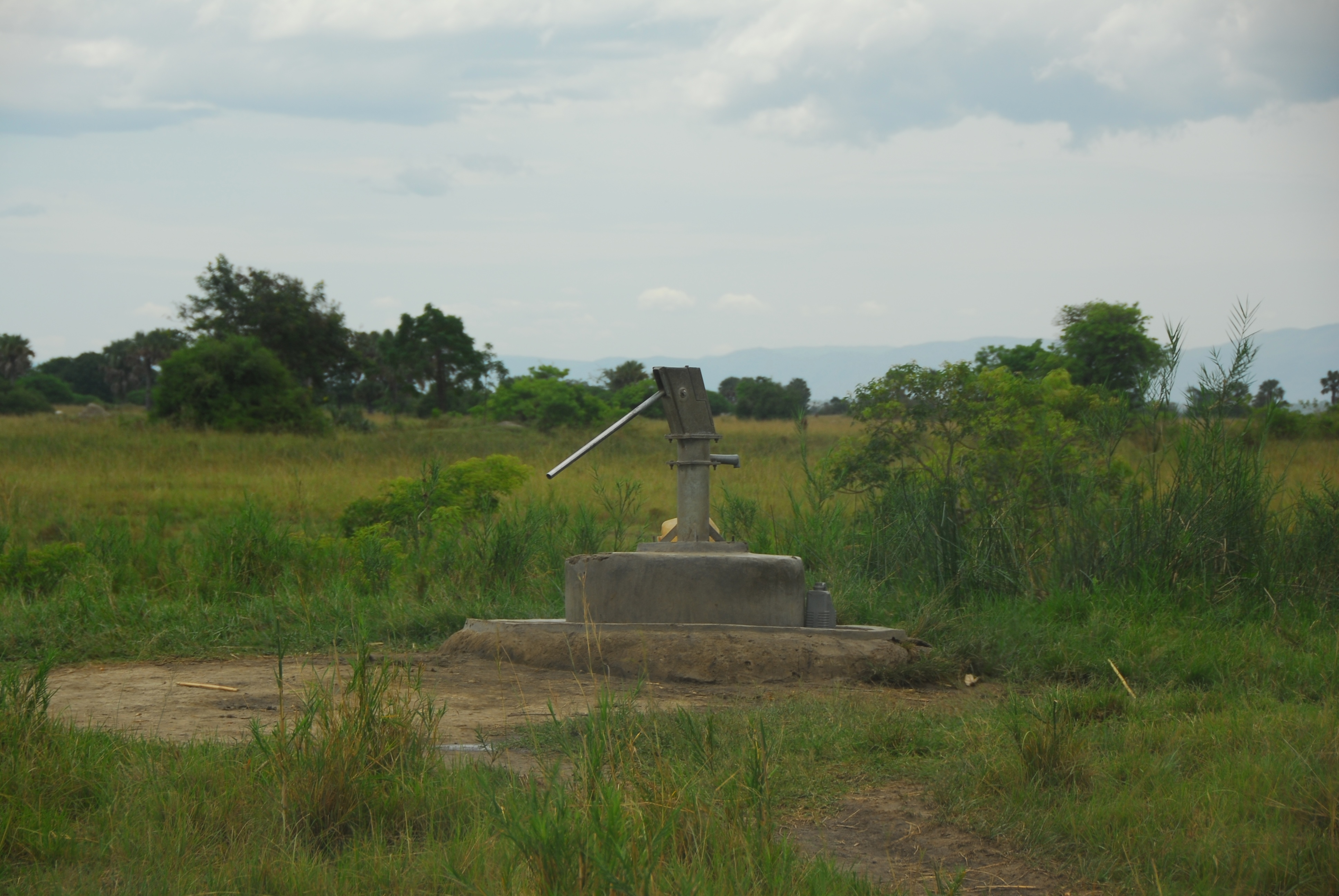
A borehole in Rwebisengo, Uganda located far from households. This may lead to failure.

=== Togo ===
- 30% of 4,550 handpumps were found to be non-functional in 2006-2007.

=== Uganda ===
- 19% of 58,366 handpumps were found to be non-functional in 2016.
- 36% of 45 surveyed community managed well sites were not functional; another 24% were either semi-functional needing minor repairs or minimally functional needing major repairs (2013).
- 16% of rural improved water points were non-functional (2013).
- In Bundibugyo, 21% of water points are not functional on average. Some subcounties have functionality rates well above 90%, but others like Kanara and Bubandi have functionality rates as low as 33%. These non-functioning systems lead to dry tap stands, resulting in about 45,000 Bundibugyo residents who are reported to be covered but in reality have to walk long distances to the nearest alternative, often an unprotected water source. Bundibugyo has registered an outbreak of either cholera or typhoid fever or both every year for the past 3 years (2013).
- Only about 7% of 377 surveyed households reported that their village hand pumps had never failed, while the rest reported that their pumps failed nearly every month (14.5%), about twice or more in a year (54%) or once a year (15.6%). Some of the non-functional water sources were considered 'landmarks' by the village residents (2013).
- A 2013 survey of 151 water schemes showed that 21.2% were not functional on the day of visit.
- 19% of 79,413 water points are not working. Shallow wells have the highest non-functionality rates (approximately 30%), while protected springs have the lowest non-functionality rate (approximately 88%). As many as 2,303 point water sources (2.9%) are considered abandoned, having been non-functional for five or more years (2012).
- On average, close to 70% of all households surveyed in all the eight districts access low or substandard water services (2012).
- 19% of water points across the country are non-functional based on the national water supply atlas (2010).
- Non-functional rural improved water points for the years 2003 to 2006 were 30%, 20%,18% and 17%, respectively.
- In 1980, UNICEF funded a national inventory of boreholes and found that, out of a national stock of 5,089, 75% were not working. An extensive rehabilitation program was undertaken, but three years later the percentage of non-working pumps had only decreased to 67.8%.

=== Vanuatu ===
- 12% of 245 handpumps were found to be non-functional in 2014-2016.

=== Zambia ===
- 27% of 25,624 handpumps were found to be non-functional in 2007.

=== Zimbabwe ===
- 28% of 29,986 handpumps were found to be non-functional in 2014-2017.
- A 2009 study in Mt Darwin District found 38% of the boreholes studied not functioning. Average downtime for the boreholes was 3 weeks.
- Out of 817 deep boreholes, 65% were estimated to be out of order (2005).

== Failures of sanitation systems ==
=== Global ===
- Demographic and health survey data from 58 countries showed that 63 percent of households use sanitation facilities requiring fecal sludge management (FSM), also called on-site, decentralized, or non-sewered sanitation, with a large proportion of waste discharged directly into the environment or waterways.

=== Afghanistan ===
- Nationally, 45% of toilets in public schools needed extensive repair or replacement in 2012.

=== Bangladesh ===
- There are an estimated 5 million to 6 million "sweepers" (sanitation workers) in Bangladesh. Manual work involves repeated direct contact with human excreta and operating in enclosed spaces that have noxious gases.

=== Cambodia ===
- In areas where community-led total sanitation (CLTS) methods were used to promote latrine use, only about 15% of households with a latrine use the toilet regularly, while the rest continue to defecate in the open (results from 2012).

=== China ===
- There was a "dry ecosan" pilot project (i.e. with using dry toilets) using urine-diverting dry toilets (UDDTs) in multi-story buildings together with other technologies to allow resource recovery from excreta. This project was called the Erdos Eco-Town Project in a town called Erdos in the Inner Mongolia Autonomous Region of China. It was a collaboration between the Dongsheng District government in Erdos and the Stockholm Environment Institute and aimed to save water and provide sanitation services in this drought-stricken and rapidly urbanizing area of northern China. For a variety of technical, social and institutional reasons, the UDDTs were removed in 2011 after only a few years and the project failed to deliver in the area of nutrient recovery.

=== Ethiopia, Kenya, Sierra Leone, Uganda ===
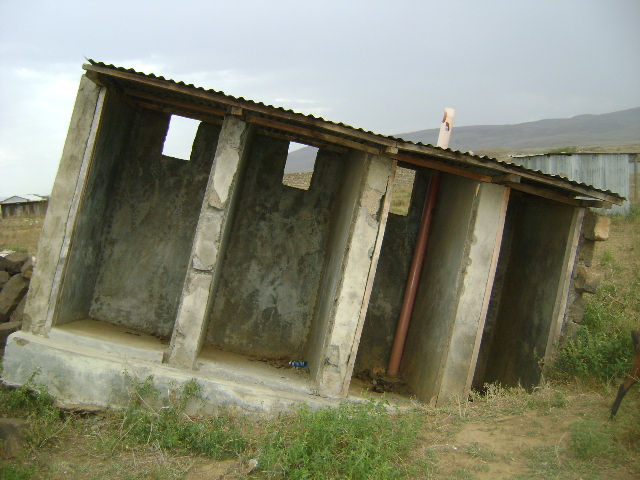
Collapsed pit latrine block around Narok, Kenya, where unlined pit latrines easily collapse in the sandy and instable soil after heavy rainfalls

- In a study commissioned by Plan in 2013, nearly 5000 households in 116 villages were re-assessed according to the original open defecation free (ODF) verification criteria of community-led total sanitation. If all five criteria listed below are applied, the overall slippage rate across the study was 92%. In all countries each household was expected to have:
  1. A functioning latrine with a superstructure
  2. A means of keeping flies from the pit
  3. Absence of excreta in the vicinity of the house
  4. Hand washing facilities with water and soap or soap-substitute such as ash
  5. Evidence that the latrine and hand washing facilities were being used

=== Haiti ===
- In October 2010, poor sanitation practices (leaking latrines) at the United Nations Stabilization Mission in Haiti (MINUSTAH) camp led to the introduction of cholera into Haiti for the first time in nearly a century. This led to more than 820,000 infections and 10,000 deaths as of 2020.

=== India ===
- In Bihar, a common practice once the pit was full was to revert to the practice of open defecation. The percentage of the population going back to open defecation was close to 90% (an educated guess in 2013 as there is no monitoring of latrine usage).

=== Madagascar ===
- 43% of villages that had been declared open defecation free (ODF) now are considered by the community as ODF, while only 25% of all villages were ODF at the time of the survey in 2014 (75% failure).

=== Malawi ===
- Proper pit latrine construction requires lining for stability and to prevent water coming in, yet 86% of Malawi's latrines are unlined as of 2024. This puts them at risk of collapse. Also, concrete slabs are recommended to improve hygiene and structural integrity, but 75% of 200,000 surveyed latrines lacked them. Furthermore, 35% of those latrines lacked roofs, and 75% offered no security or privacy.

=== Nigeria ===
- 2022 - In Kureke, Nigeria, private waste collectors illegally dump sewage and solid waste into artificial lakes. Though not government-sanctioned dumping sites, these lakes remain unmonitored, allowing the practice to continue unchecked.

=== South Africa ===
- Five-year-old Lumka Mkhethwa drowned in a pit latrine at Luna Primary School in the Eastern Cape province in March 2018.
- Six-year-old Siyamthanda Mtunu died in 2017 after the walls of a toilet collapsed on him at Dalasile Primary School in the Eastern Cape.
- Five-year-old Oratilwe Dilwane fell into a pit latrine in 2016 at Tlhotlheletsang Primary School in North West province. He swallowed excrement and was severely injured.
- Seven-year-old Lister Magongwa died in 2013 after the walls of a toilet collapsed on him at Mmushi Primary School in Limpopo.
- In January 2014, five-year-old Michael Komape drowned in a pit toilet at Mahlodumela Primary School in Limpopo.
- According to the BBC article "South Africa's school pit latrine scandal: Why children are drowning", "More than 4,500 schools have pit latrine toilets, out of almost 25,000 nationwide. Many are made from cheap metal, are shoddily built and left uncovered. Eastern Cape, KwaZulu-Natal and Limpopo provinces are among the worst, says Education Minister Angie Motshekga. Eastern Cape has 61 schools with no toilets at all, and 1,585 schools with pit latrines. Neighbouring KwaZulu-Natal province has 1,379 pit latrines in use. Limpopo province, where Michael Komape went to school, has at least 932 unsafe toilets."
- An informal survey of toilets at schools that fall within four of the National Health Insurance pilot districts found that at all 17 schools the toilets were in a shocking condition in 2013.

=== Uganda ===
- Gulu, Uganda (2022): During July and August, Paicho Subcounty’s rainy season brings “aluka” - groundwater that emerges everywhere. Pit latrines overflow and collapse, forcing families to use bushes for defecation. Rain washes this waste downstream into water shared by humans and livestock. Though this affects the entire community through contaminated water, many still view it as isolated household problems rather than a collective crisis.

=== Zambia ===
- WASH factors have been found to be one of the causes of 11.4% of deaths in Zambia. Over half of Zambia's population has access to improved drinking water and less than half of the population has access to adequate sanitation. Peri-urban statistics reveal that majority of the peri-urban population has no access to safe water and sanitation facilities.

== See also ==
- WASH - Water, Sanitation and Hygiene
