= KWW =

KWW may refer to:

- The Kohlrausch-Williams-Watts function is the Fourier transform of the stretched exponential function
- Katosi Water Works, water treatment facility in Uganda
- Krekel van der Woerd Wouterse, Dutch management consultants from 1960 to 1996
- Kwinti language (by ISO 639-3 language code)
