= Stephen Besweri Akabway =

Chairman of the Interim Electoral Commission
- In office 1994–1996
- Preceded by: Position established

Deputy Commissioner General of the Uganda Revenue Authority
- In office 1997–2005

Member of the Tax Appeals Tribunal

Personal details
- Born: August 20, 1941 (age 85) Teso Region, Uganda
- Citizenship: Ugandan
- Education: University of Dar es Salaam; University of Nairobi; University of Edinburgh; Washington University in St. Louis
- Occupation: Educator, public administrator, electoral administrator, tax administrator

Stephen Besweri Akabway (born 20 August 1941) is a Ugandan former educator, public administrator, electoral administrator and tax administrator.

== Early life and education ==
Besweri was born on 20 August 1941 in Teso region, Uganda during the World War II. He attended Ngora High School, where he studied junior secondary education from 1955 to 1957. He then attended Teso College Aloet from 1958 to 1961, completing his O-Level studies and serving as head boy in his final year. From 1962 to 1963, he attended Ntare School for his A-Level education, where he served as a House Captain. He proceeded to the University of Dar es Salaam, where he studied for a Bachelor of Arts degree from 1964 to 1967.

He later joined the University of Nairobi, where he pursued a Postgraduate Diploma in Education from 1968 to 1969. Between 1972 and 1973, he studied at the University of Edinburgh and obtained a Higher Diploma in Education. In addition, Besweri returned to higher education in the United States, attending Washington University from 2001 to 2006, where he pursued and obtained a Master of Arts and a PhD.

== Career ==
Besweri began his professional career in education, serving as a teacher at Ngora High School from 1967 to 1971. In 1974, he became a tutor at National Teachers College Kyambogo and was appointed Headmaster of Bukedi College Kachonga in 1975. From 1976 to 1979, he served as Head Teacher of Teso College Aloet, where he continued his contribution to Uganda’s education sector.

From 1979 to 1989, Besweri served as a Senior Inspector with the Ministry of Education and Sports. He later moved into public administration and national affairs, serving as Commissioner of the Presidential Commission for Teso from 1990 to 1991. In 1992–1993, he worked as Senior Principal Revenue Officer at the Uganda Revenue Authority (URA), before serving as Commissioner of the Constituent Assembly from 1993 to 1994.

Besweri then took on responsibilities in Uganda’s electoral and revenue institutions. From 1994 to 1996, he served as Chairman of the Interim Electoral Commission. He returned to the Uganda Revenue Authority as Commissioner of Customs from 1996 to 1997 and later served as Commissioner of Finance in 1997 before serving as Deputy Commissioner General of the Uganda Revenue Authority from 1997 to 2005.

In addition, Besweri served as a member of the Tax Appeals Tribunal for 15 years.

== See also ==
- Allen Kagina
- Badru Kiggundu
- Gerald Ssendaula
- Doris Akol
