= Kinshasa Industrial Water Treatment Complex =

Water purification and distribution system in the Democratic Republic of the Congo

- Location within Democratic Republic of the Congo
- Interactive map of Kinshasa Industrial Water Treatment Complex
- Location: Kinshasa
- Coordinates: 04°27′17″S 15°21′09″E
- Estimated output: 110,000 cubic meters (110,000,000 L) of water daily
- Cost: US$72 million
- Technology: Sedimentation, Chlorination
- Operation date: February 2023

The Kinshasa Industrial Water Treatment Complex (KIWTC), is a water purification and distribution project in the Democratic Republic of the Congo (DRC). Construction began in August 2021 and completion and commercial commissioning was achieved in February 2023. The engineering, procurement and construction (EPC) contractor is Weihai International Economic & Technical Cooperative (WIETC), of China. The project is owned and is financed by the government of DRC, with funds borrowed from the World Bank Group.

== Location ==
The water treatment facility is located in the western suburbs of the capital city of Kinshasa, adjacent to the military base in Ngaliema, in the southwestern part of the city.

== Overview ==
As of January 2020, the city of Kinshasa was home to an estimated population of 12 million people. Following diagnostic and feasibility studies by the Antea Group, funded by the International Development Association (IDA), the DRC officials decided to build a new water treatment complex capable of delivering 110,000 cubic meters (110,000,000 L) of potable water to the city on a daily basis. Under long-term planning, the city plans to expand the capacity of the complex to three times the initial size. The World Bank funded this project to the tune of US$59.4 million. Later, the same source reported that the loan had been increased to US$72 million.

== Ownership ==
The water treatment facility is wholly owned by the Régie de distribution d'eau (REGIDESO), the government parastatal company, responsible for provision of potable water nationwide.

== Construction ==
The construction of the Kinshasa Industrial Water Treatment Complex is part of a larger plan called Urban Drinking Water Supply Project (Pemu). Pemu's objective is to (a) sustainably increase access to potable water in the cities of Kinshasa, Lubumbashi and Matadi and (b) improve the efficiency of Regideso, the country's public water distribution company. Pemu will cost an estimated US$360 million to complete.

The design of KIWTC calls for a water intake pipe, measuring 805 millimetres (32 in) in diameter, inserted into the Congo River. The intake pipe will travel through the city for approximately 3 kilometres (2 mi) to a temporary storage facility, before it enters the treatment plant. On its way from the Congo River to the new water processing facility, the intake pipe passes through Colonel Tshatshi Military Camp in the neighborhood called Ngaliema, in the western suburbs of Kinshasa.

Related new infrastructure includes the construction of a building specifically dedicated to the storage of water treatment chemicals. Work also includes the rehabilitation of over 150 kilometres (93 mi) of primary, secondary and tertiary distribution water pipes.

== Commissioning ==
The completed water purification plant was inaugurated by Félix Antoine Tshisekedi Tshilombo, the head of state of DRC in February 2023.

== See also ==
- Katosi Water Works
