= African Water and Sanitation Association =

African water and sanitation organization

- Formation: February 1980; 46 years ago
- Type: Professional association
- Legal status: Association
- Purpose: "To coordinate the search for knowledge and latest development in the technical, legal, administrative and economic fields for Drinking water production, supply and of sanitation"
- Headquarters: Riviera Palmeraie, Abidjan, Ivory Coast
- Region served: Africa
- Members: 40+
- President: Silver Mugisha
- Website: afwasa.org/index.php/en/

The African Water and Sanitation Association (AfWASA) is a professional association of "water and sanitation sector actors", on the African continent. Members include "water and sanitation utility companies, asset management companies, sanitation boards, regulators, private service providers, NGOs, researchers and professionals from academia, and public policy" among others.

== Location ==
The headquarters of AfWASA are located in Riviera Palmeraie, Cocody, in Abidjan the capital city of Ivory Coast.

== Overview ==
The association works in collaboration with many international development financial institutions and donors, including the World Bank, the United Nations, USAID, UNICEF, the Bill and Melinda Gates Foundation, the OPEC Fund for International Development, the African Development Bank and others. It is estimated that "350 million people are affected by its actions in the water and sanitation sectors".

== History ==
In February 1980, Zadi Kessy Marcel an Ivorian national, who at that time was the managing director of SODECI, the national water utility in Ivory Coast, organized the founding congress of the African Union of Water Suppliers (AUWS), with its headquarters in Liberia.

Between 1990 and 2000 many private service providers, asset management companies, regulators, water and sanitation boards joined the association. Over time, NGOs, researchers, academicians and public policy scholars became members.

In 2000 the African Union of Water Suppliers rebranded to the African Water Association (AfWA). In March 2021, the association's General Assembly voted to change its name again to the present one, to include sanitation. The new name came into effect on 20 February 2023 during the 20th International Congress and Exhibition of the AfWA, in Abidjan, Ivory Coast.

== Governance ==
The President of the association is Silver Mugisha, the chief executive officer of National Water and Sewerage Corporation (NWSC), the national water and sewerage utility company in Uganda. Effective 1 January 2024, the executive director of AfWASA is François Olivier Gosso, an Ivorian general engineer, who succeeded Sylvain Usher, who served in that role from 1999 until 2023.

== Research grants ==
In 2024, AfWASA established research grants of US$1,000 each, available to young researchers in the fields pertinent to the association goals. Eligible candidates must be citizens of sub-Saharan African countries and enrolled in a master's degree program at a recognized university. The grants are funded by the African Development Bank.

== See also ==
- Uganda National Water and Sewerage Corporation
