= National Water and Sewerage Corporation =

Ugandan water company

Coordinates: 00°19′04″N 32°34′52″E

- Type: Public utility
- Industry: Water
- Founded: 1972; 54 years ago
- Headquarters: 3 Nakasero Road, Kampala, Uganda
- Key people: Badru Kiggundu; Chairman; Silver Mugisha; Managing Director and CEO
- Services: Water Supply and Sanitation
- Total assets: USh 4.5 trillion (US$1.23 billion) (2025)
- Number of employees: 2,860 (2016)
- Parent: Government of Uganda
- Website: www.nwsc.co.ug

The National Water and Sewerage Corporation (NWSC) is a water supply and sanitation company in Uganda. It is wholly owned by the government of Uganda.

As of October 2023, the company supplied 730,000,000 cubic metres (2.5779706707×10^{10} cu ft) of potable water daily to the country. This compares to 276,000,000 cubic metres (9.746848015×10^{9} cu ft) daily output, supplied ten years earlier in 2013. This represents an 85 percent increase over those ten years. As of 2024 the corporation's non-revenue water was 34 percent, with plans to reduce it to 30 percent by 2029. The total population benefitting from NWSC water supply in 2024 was estimated at 18 million, with a target to increase that to 25 million by 2029.

== Location ==
The company, as of July 2018, was in the final stages of construction of its new headquarters building at 3 Nakasero Road, on Nakasero Hill, opposite Rwenzori House. The new headquarters building was commissioned by Ruhakana Rugunda, the Prime Minister of Uganda, in July 2018.

== History ==
NWSC was formed by Decree No. 34 in 1972 to serve the urban areas of Kampala, Entebbe, and Jinja. In 1995, NWSC was re-organized under the NWSC Statute. The company was given more authority and autonomy and the mandate to operate and provide water and sewerage services in areas entrusted to it, on a sound commercial and viable basis. As of October 2016, the following cities and towns receive services from NWSC:

Cities and Towns Served by NWSC
City	Town	Municipality
Kampala	Bushenyi	Kateete
Kira	Kigumba	Luweero
Gulu	Paidha	Buyanja
Jinja	Kitagata	Butogota
Entebbe	Wakiso	Kebisoni
Mbale	Pader	Kamwenge
Masaka	Kaliro	Kajjansi
Mbarara	Malaba	Kanyampanga
Hoima	Kisoro	Nyakagyeme
Kasese	Iganga	Kaberamaido
Mukono	Ishaka	Kanungu
Arua	Rukungiri	Aduku
Masindi	Amuria	Nebbi
Soroti	Apac	Kalisizo
Kitgum	Wobulenzi	Kihihi
Bombo	Kabwohe	Nyamirama
Kabale	Kiryandongo	Kalaki
Lira	Lyantonde	Oteboi
Tororo	Kalisizo	Kanyantorogo
Fort Portal	Kambuga	Atilis
Mubende	Ibanda	Rwerere
Njeru	Lugazi	Kangyenyi
Mityana	Ssabagabo	Itendero

== Expansion plans ==
In 2011, NWSC began implementing a program to improve water supply to the Kampala Metropolitan Area that includes Kampala City, Wakiso District, Mukono District, Nansana, Ssabagabo, and Kira. The program, which will cost €212 million, is financed by the government of Uganda (€34 million), KfW (€20 million grant), the European Investment Bank (€75 million loan), the French Development Agency (€75 million loan), and the European Union Infrastructure Trust Fund (€8 million grant).

NWSC constructed a new water treatment plant (Katosi Water Works), in Katosi in Mukono District with the capacity to supply 120,000 cubic meters (120,000,000 L) of water daily. The plans also include the refurbishment of the Ggaba complex of water treatment plants (Ggaba 1, Ggaba 2 and Ggaba 3). The Katosi source of water complements the existing sources that have a daily capacity of 160,000 cubic meters (160,000,000 L).

In December 2015, NWSC announced plans to start serving some of Uganda's rural areas. As of March 2018, NWSC offered its services in 225 Ugandan towns and planned to connect services to 12,000 villages within its service areas by 2020.

In February 2026, with funding from the French Development Agency, KfW and the European Investment Bank, NWSC began expansion of the water distribution network in northern and western Kampala as well as neighbouring parts of Wakiso District. The works involve increasing production capacity at Katosi Water Works by 80,000 cubic metres (2,825,173 cu ft) per day. New water distribution pipes are being laid and construction of new above-ground water reservoirs is ongoing. The Government of France through AFD has invested €480 million. Completion of construction is anticipated in Q2 of 2027.

== Power plant to operate Ggaba water treatment plants ==
In October 2014, NWSC advertised for a private partner to build, own, and operate a 7 megawatt independent power station to meet the company's energy needs at its Ggaba I, Ggaba II, and Ggaba III water treatment plants. This would lower NWSC's power bill, which stood at approximately USh 24 billion (approx. US$6.5 million) annually, accounting for 35 percent of total operating expenditure. When procured, the partner will sign a 20-year power purchase agreement with NWSC, which will have the option of selling any excess power to the national grid.

== Organizational structure ==
NWSC has numerous divisions, each headed by a director, general manager, senior manager, or manager.

== Board of directors ==
NWSC is governed by a five-member board of directors. Engineer Badru Kiggundu is the chairman and Engineer Silver Mugisha is the managing director and chief executive officer.

== See also ==
- African Water and Sanitation Association
- Water supply and sanitation in Uganda
- Katosi Water Works
