= Uganda Printing and Publishing Corporation =

Ugandan government printing company

Agency overview
- Formed: 1902; 124 years ago
- Jurisdiction: Government of Uganda
- Headquarters: Entebbe, Wakiso, Uganda
- Parent agency: Ministry for the Presidency, Government of Uganda
- Website: https://www.uppc.go.ug/

Uganda Printing and Publishing Corporation (UPPC) is a government-owned corporation responsible for official printing, publishing, and security printing services in Uganda. It is best known as the publisher of the Uganda Gazette, the official government publication for laws, regulations, notices, and statutory instruments.

== Location ==
The Uganda Printing and Publishing Corporation headquarters is located in Entebbe, Wakiso District, along Airport Road, at Plot 8–12 Airport Road, Entebbe, Uganda.

== History ==
Uganda Printing and Publishing Corporation is a government-owned institution responsible for official printing, publishing, and production of the Uganda Gazette and other government documents. The institution began in 1902 during the British Colonial period as the Government Printer and was to print official government documents for colonial administration.

After Uganda’s independence in 1962, the Government Printer continued operating under the Office of the President, serving ministries and government departments. In 1992, Parliament passed the Uganda Printing and Publishing Corporation Act (Cap. 215), which formally established UPPC as a statutory public corporation. The Act made UPPC a body corporate with perpetual succession, meaning it operates independently under government ownership.

== Administration ==
In accordance with the UPPC Act, Cap. 215 of 1992, Prof. Tom Davis Waswa served as Managing Director of the Uganda Printing and Publishing Corporation (UPPC). Kenneth Oluka also served as the Acting Managing Director for UPPC from 2021 to 2023. In 2023, the Board of Directors of UPPC appointed Prof. Sudi Nangoli as the Managing Director, replacing Kenneth Oluka.

== See also ==
- Uganda Revenue Authority
- Uganda Registration Services Bureau
