= Mbalala =

- Location in Uganda
- Coordinates: 00°22′11″N 32°49′23″E
- Country: Uganda
- Region: Central Region of Uganda
- District: Mukono District
- Elevation: 3,615 ft (1,102 m)

Mbalala, is an urban center in the Central Region of Uganda.

== Location ==
Mbalala is located in Mukono District, on Kampala-Jinja Highway, approximately 9 kilometres (5.6 mi), by road, east of Mukono, where the district headquarters are located. This is about 30 kilometres (19 mi) east of Kampala, the national capital and largest city in the country. The coordinates of the town are 0°22'11.0"N, 32°49'23.0"E (Latitude:0.369716; Longitude:32.823048). The town sits at an average altitude of 1,102 metres (3,615 ft), above sea level.

== Overview ==
The town is home to two Chinese, manufacturing companies (a) Tian Tang Group and (b) Global Paper Limited. Tian Tang manufactures steel and mattresses. Global Paper manufactures paper products. Together, the two factories employ in excess of 1,000 people, and operate 24 hours daily.

== See also ==
- List of cities and towns in Uganda
