= Water supply and sanitation in Uganda =

Data
- Water coverage (broad definition): ("at least basic sanitation" / improved sanitation facilities) 92% / 79% (in 2015)
- Sanitation coverage (broad definition): ("at least basic sanitation" / improved sanitation) 93% / 19% (in 2015)
- Continuity of supply: 20–24 hours per day in large towns
- Average urban water use (L/person/day): 44
- Average urban water and sanitation tariff (US$/m^{3}): 0.64
- Share of household metering: 99% in large towns (2006)
- Annual investment in WSS: US$2.37 per capita
- Share of external financing: Mainly external donors

Institutions
- Decentralization to municipalities: Since 1997: To districts, towns and sub-counties
- National water and sanitation company: National Water and Sewerage Corporation (NWSC), in large towns
- Water and sanitation regulator: None
- Responsibility for policy setting: Ministry of Water and Environment
- Sector law: None
- No. of urban service providers: n/a
- No. of rural service providers: n/a

The Ugandan water supply and sanitation sector made substantial progress in urban areas from the mid-1990s until at least 2006, with substantial increases in coverage as well as in operational and commercial performance. Sector reforms from 1998 to 2003 included the commercialization and modernization of the National Water and Sewerage Corporation (NWSC) operating in cities and larger towns, as well as decentralization and private sector participation in small towns.

These reforms have attracted significant international attention. Thirty-eight percent of the population, however, still had no access to an improved water source in 2010. Concerning access to improved sanitation, figures vary widely. According to government figures, it was 70 percent in rural areas and 81 percent in urban areas while according to the United Nations (UN), access was only 34 percent.

The water and sanitation sector was recognized as a key area under the 2004 Poverty Eradication Action Plan (PEAP), Uganda's main strategy paper to fight poverty. A comprehensive expenditure framework was introduced to coordinate financial support by external donors, the national government, and non-governmental organizations. The PEAP estimated that from 2001 to 2015, about US$1.4 billion in total (US$92 million per year) was needed to increase water supply coverage up to 95 percent.

== Access ==
In 2015, around 24 percent of the population lacked access to "at least basic water" in Uganda. Access to at least basic water was 39 percent of the total population, or 73% of the urban population and 32% of the rural population. Regarding sanitation, only 19% of the total population had access to "at least basic sanitation", or 28% of the urban population and 17% of the rural population. Around 31 million people did not have access to "at least basic sanitation" in 2015. The Human Rights Measurement Initiative has given Uganda a score of 22.9% with regards to basic sanitation, and 9.5% for water supply.

In earlier years, access to "improved water" had increased from 43 percent in 1990 to 72 percent in 2010, according to estimates by the Joint Monitoring Program for Water Supply and Sanitation (JMP) of the UN. In the same period, access to "improved sanitation" increased slightly from 27 to 34 percent.

The Water and Environment Sector Performance Report of the Ugandan Ministry of Water and Irrigation, however, showed markedly different access figures. According to this report, in 2011, access to "safe water" was 66 percent while access to improved sanitation was 70 percent in rural areas and 81 percent in urban areas. Eighty-seven percent of the population lived in rural areas in 2010.

According to the European Union (EU), the number of people defecating in the open fell substantially between 2000 and 2008, even though the government provides no subsidies for the construction of latrines. According to the JMP's estimates, however, the number of people defecating in the open declined only from 3.5 million in 2000 to 3.2 million in 2010. The reasons for the different assessments are unclear.

The most common technology options for rural water supply are protected springs, boreholes, protected wells, and gravity flow schemes. Those who do not have access to an improved source of water must rely on unsafe sources such as rivers, lakes, and unprotected wells. One consequence of poor access and quality is that water-borne diseases are a major cause of infant mortality. Access to functioning water sources varied considerably among districts in 2007, from 12 to 95 percent.

The national government aimed to reach universal water supply and sanitation coverage in urban areas and 77 percent water supply and 95 percent sanitation coverage by 2015. At the time these goals were set, the government defined access to improved water supply and sanitation as follows: improved water supply in urban areas is given through an improved water source within a walking distance of 1.5 kilometres (0.93 mi) in rural areas and 0.2 kilometres (0.12 mi) in urban areas. Sanitation coverage is given through sanitation facilities in the place of residence.

== Service quality ==
=== Continuity of supply ===
According to Maxwell Stamp PLC, those who received a piped water supply in 2003 in the nation's capital Kampala were "usually" supplied continuously for 24 hours per day. NWSC, however, acknowledged that parts of Kampala such as Kyaliwajala, Kulambiro, and most places on hilltops suffered from chronic water shortages. In addition, some areas went without water for a week when repairs were undertaken. In other towns, Maxwell Stamp PLC found in 2003 that most customers were supplied more than five days per week.

MWE indicated in 2006 that piped water in large towns was usually available for 20–24 hours per day.

=== Drinking water quality ===
Under the fourth Water and Sanitation Sector Performance Assessment, based on analyses by several subsectors and NGOs carried out in 2006, it was found that 90 percent and 95 percent of the water samples taken from protected and treated water supplies, respectively, met national standards for drinking water quality. This assessment comprised both rural and urban water supply.

=== Waste water treatment ===
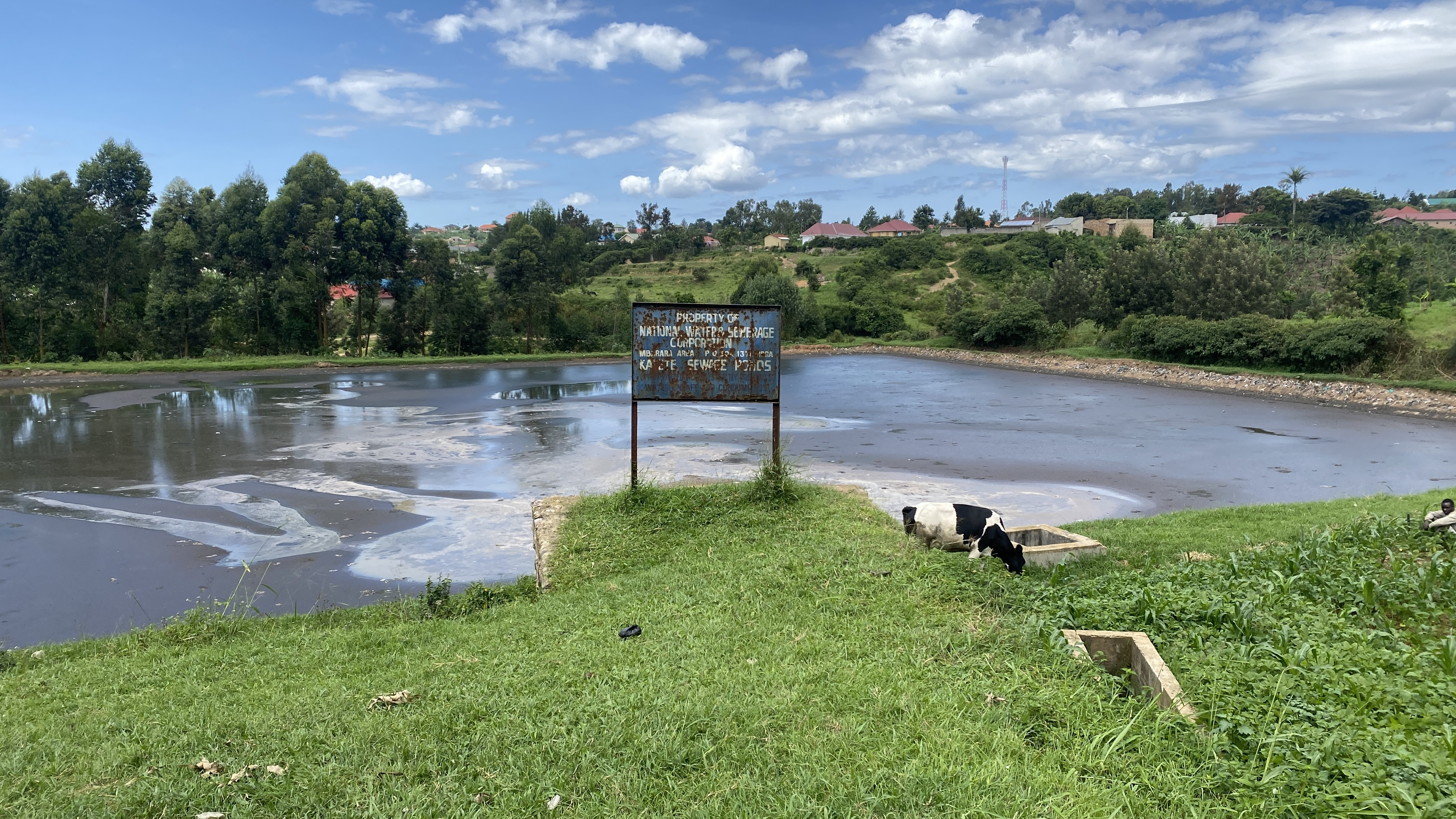
NWSC Sewage ponds in Katete in Mbarara in western Uganda near River Rwizi

As of 2012, 90 percent of the collected wastewater of Kampala was discharged without any treatment. NWSC operates a small conventional sewage treatment plant in Kampala and another in Masaka. In the case of Kampala, the wastewater is discharged into the Nakivubo wetland. The wetland is estimated to provide economic benefits of up to US$1.75 million per year, removing nutrients from untreated and partially treated wastewater discharged from Kampala through the wetland into Lake Victoria.

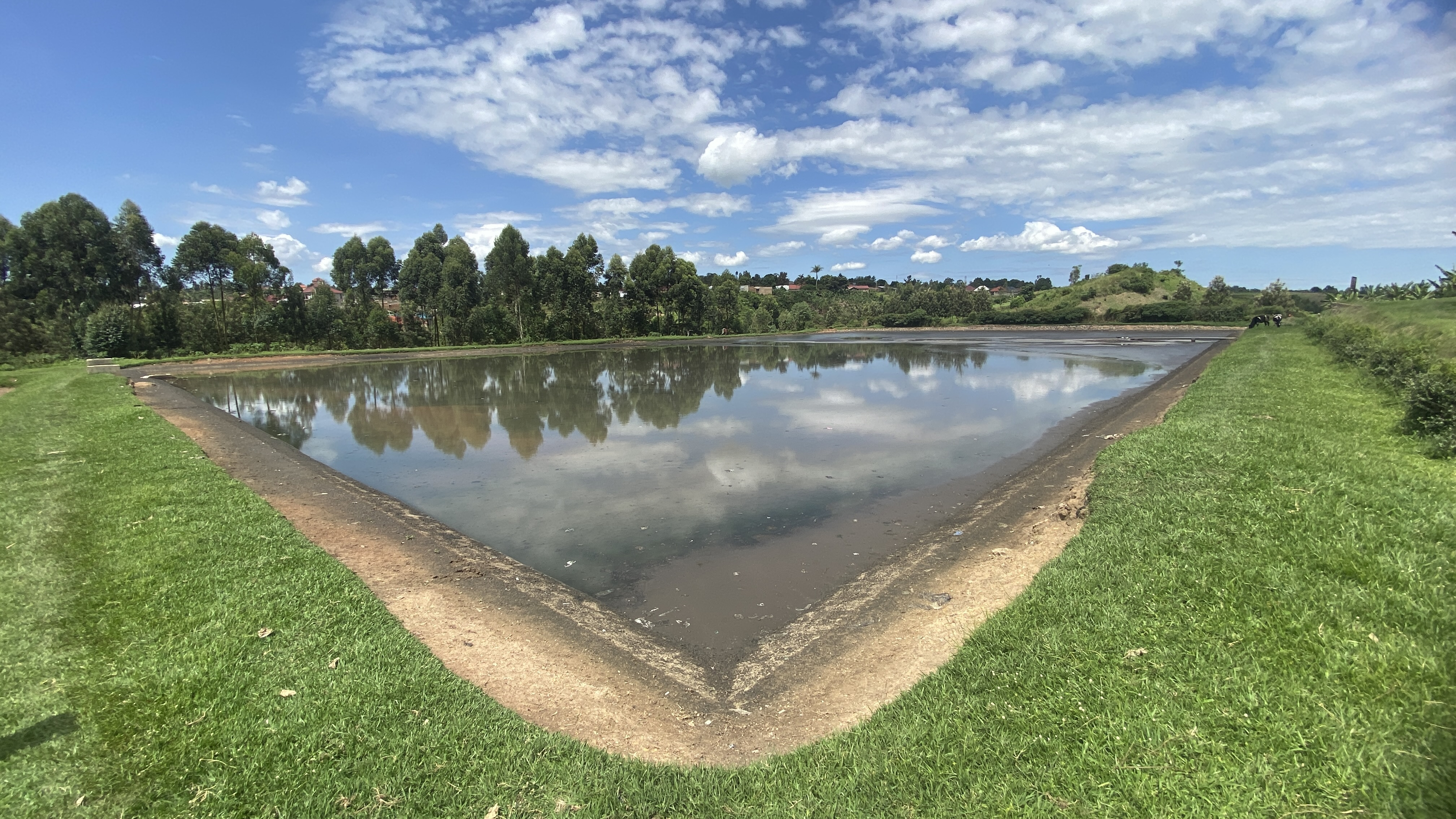
NWSC Sewage ponds in Katete in Mbarara City in western Uganda

As part of a Sanitation Master Plan for Kampala carried out by Fichtner Consultants with financing from Germany, four wastewater treatment plants were planned. The plans included a plant with a capacity of 45,000 cubic metres (1,600,000 ft^{3}) per day at Nakivubo, a plant with a capacity of 8,000 cubic metres (280,000 ft^{3}) per day at Kinawataka, a fecal sludge treatment plant with a capacity of 200 cubic metres (7,100 ft^{3}) per day at Lubigi, and another plant at Nalukolongo. The plan also foresaw the construction of ecological latrines at schools, market places, and health centres and hygiene education at schools. The investments were to be funded by the European Union, the World Bank, the African Development Bank, and Germany. The existing plant at Bugolobi was planned to be decommissioned once the new plants became operational.

In smaller towns, NWSC operates 21 sewage stabilization ponds. According to the MWE, an analysis of municipal effluents carried out in July 2008 revealed that NWSC's wastewater treatment facilities mostly do not meet national standards. Out of 223 data sets, 12 percent complied with the biochemical oxygen demand standards, 26 percent with the phosphorus standards, and 40 percent with the total suspended solids standards. This leads to the pollution of water bodies from which raw water is extracted. In a few cases, sewage was disposed directly into the environment without any treatment. The lack of functioning wastewater treatment poses a threat to the environment and human health.

=== Customer satisfaction ===
A customer satisfaction survey was carried out in 2009–2010 for all towns served by NWSC. It covered questions such as satisfaction with water reliability, water pressure, water quality, timely and accurate water bills, responsiveness in resolving complaints, responsiveness in effecting new connections, customer care, and the convenience of the bill payment process. Out of 5,319 customers contacted in a stratified sample, 2,731 responded. Customer care received the highest rating, while water quality and pressure received lower, but overall good, ratings. A customer satisfaction index was calculated across all questions, showing that 85 percent of customers were satisfied, up from 83 percent during the last survey. Satisfaction was highest in Hoima, Iganda, and Masindi at 95 percent and lowest in the central Ugandan town of Mubende, where no customer care officer or desk existed, at 62 percent. In Kampala, satisfaction was 83 percent. Customers appreciated the ambiance in local offices, that phone calls are made to remind customers of payment, that customers can settle their arrears through payment plans in exceptional cases, and that water cuts are announced through the radio. Customers complained about low water pressure, muddy water during the wet season, supply interruptions during the dry season, low water pressure, slow implementation of new connections, erratic bills, disconnection despite having paid their water bills, and the rudeness of field staff.

== Water resources ==
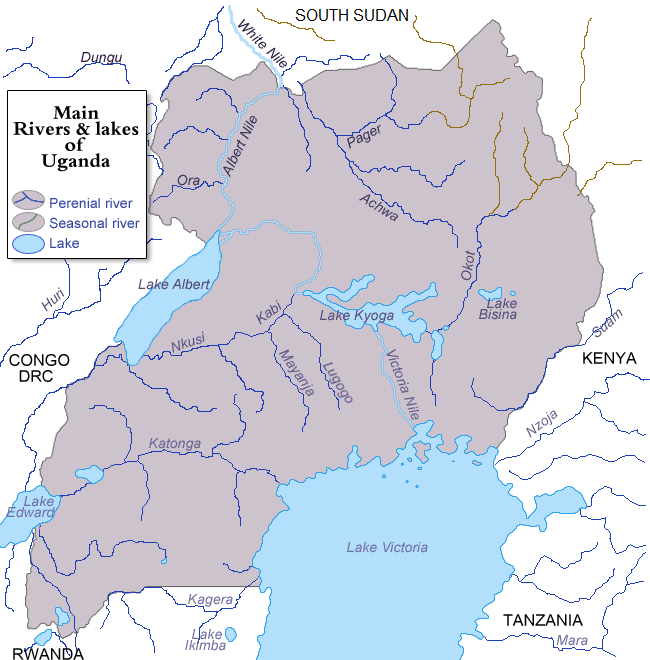
Rivers and lakes of Uganda.

=== Overview ===
As a whole, Uganda has more than enough freshwater. Estimates indicate 66 cubic kilometres (16 cu mi) of renewable water resources per year, which correspond to approximately 2,800 cubic metres (740,000 US gal) per person and year. The distribution of the resource, however, is uneven both in spatial and temporal terms. Furthermore, freshwater is increasingly exploited through population growth, urbanization, agriculture, and industrialization.

Rivers, lakes, and wetlands cover about 18 percent of Uganda's total surface, including Lake Victoria, Africa's largest lake and one of the major sources of the Nile, the world's longest river. Almost the entire country lies within the Nile drainage basin. Rainfall contributes the most to the country's surface water and groundwater. The average annual rainfall ranges from 900 millimetres (35 in) in the semi-arid areas of Kotido to 2,000 millimetres (79 in) on the Sese Islands in Lake Victoria.

There are no groundwater recharge assessments for Uganda, which is why the country's groundwater potential is unknown. Regional assessments in Ugandan towns, however, have indicated that groundwater recharge meets the current abstraction volumes. To monitor the quantity and quality of groundwater and surface water, the National Water Resources network has been established under the responsibility of the Water Resources Management Department.

=== Lake Victoria ===
Between 2003 and 2006, Lake Victoria lost 75 million cubic meters, about 69 percent of its volume, but has since recovered to above normal. The causes of the decline were disputed. According to some reports, the 10-15 percent decline in rainfall in the lake's basin caused the lake to lower. According to Daniel Kull, at the time a hydrologist with the UN's International Strategy for Disaster Reduction in Nairobi, the drought would have caused only half the water loss actually seen if two hydroelectric dams at the outlet of the lake into the White Nile had been operated according to the "agreed curve" determined in a 1953 agreement on the Nile flows between Uganda and Egypt. Sandy-Stevens Tickodri-Togboa, professor of engineering mathematics at Makerere University, disagreed and calculated that the drought caused 80 to 85 percent of the decline.

Kampala and Entebbe are supplied with water from Lake Victoria through four treatment plants: Ggaba I, II and III as well as a recently built plant in Katosi in Mukono District.

== Water use ==
According to the PEAP for 2004–5 to 2007–8, water use in rural areas ranged between 12 and 14 liters per person per day (L/p/d). In urban towns and centers with a population of more than 5,000 people, the PEAP estimated an average consumption of less than 17 L/p/d. The national target is an average consumption of 20 L/p/d.

According to the NWSC's annual report, the utility's total water production from July 2007 to June 2008 (fiscal year 2007/2008) for 23 towns was 63,600,000 cubic metres (2.25×10^{9} ft^{3}), of which 79 percent were produced in Kampala. Domestic customers used 46.9 percent or 29,800,000 cubic metres (1.05×10^{9} ft^{3}) of NWSC's total production. Divided by the 1,944,741 people whom NWSC served at the end of June 2008, this corresponds to 15.3 cubic metres (540 ft^{3}) per person per year or 44 L/p/d.

== History and recent developments ==
The first piped water systems were completed during the colonial period in the 1930s. Water-borne sewerage was introduced after 1937. The construction of new facilities increased from 1950 to 1965 under the framework of large national development programs. Later, the existing systems were only partly maintained and no new facilities were constructed until 1990. According to a UN-Water document, by 1990 the urban water infrastructure served less than 10 percent of the population in large towns.

Around the end of the 1980s, international donors began to invest substantial financial resources to rehabilitate and renew the water network in Kampala. For example, the World Bank contributed US$60 million under the Water Supply Project, which was active from 1990 to 1998 (see below). Although the financial support helped to rehabilitate the infrastructure, the commercial performance of NWSC was still unsatisfactory.

=== The reform of the National Water and Sewerage Corporation ===
==== Description of the reform process ====
The NWSC was created as a government-owned parastatal organization in 1972 under the national administration of Idi Amin Dada, serving only Entebbe, Jinja, and the capital city Kampala. Its service area then grew gradually to incorporate large and mid-sized towns all over Uganda, reaching a total of 23 cities and towns in 2008, and 40 cities and towns in another extension of its service area in February 2014.

In 1995 and 2000, NWSC was reorganized under the NWSC Statute and NWSC Act, giving it substantial operational autonomy and the mandate to operate and provide water and sewerage in areas entrusted to it, on a sound, commercial, and viable basis. Internal reforms at NWSC started in 1998, beginning with a "Strengths, Weaknesses, Opportunities, Threats" (SWOT) analysis initiated by a new management team. At that time, the utility benefited from a recently rehabilitated water and sewerage infrastructure, including abundant water production capacity and a high level of metering, a competent senior management team, and a good and enabling water legislative framework providing NWSC with relative autonomy. On the other hand, NWSC was in bad condition with regard to operational and financial aspects. For example, non-revenue water (NRW), water which is produced but not billed for several reasons such as leakage and illegal connections, stood at 60 percent. The utility was heavily overstaffed, and staff costs accounted for 64 percent of the total operating costs.

In late 1998, the national government appointed William Tsimwa Muhairwe as the managing director of NWSC. He had been managing public companies in Uganda and elsewhere. Under a new board, more emphasis was placed on commercial viability. At the same time, political interference within the utility was reduced. The new management soon drew up several programs to implement the principles, the first of which was the 100-days program, aiming to adjust operational and financial inefficiencies.

Programs to improve financial and operational efficiency of NWSC
| Program | Objective(s) | Measures | Time of implementation |
|---|---|---|---|
| 100-days program | Reverse of operational and financial inefficiencies | Improved revenue collection and cost-cutting measures | February 1999 – May 1999 |
| Service and revenue enhancement program | Restoring customer confidence | Introduction of service centers and help desks, customer surveys | August 1999 – August 2000 |
| Area and service performance contracts | Commercial sustainability | Managers were given more autonomy and liability through performance contracts | 2000–2003 |
| Stretch-out program | Improving team work | More staff involvement, flatter hierarchical structure | 2002–2003 |
| One-minute management program | Individual performance accountability | Incentives for achievements of individual goals | 2003 |
| Internally delegated area management contracts (IDAMCs) | Increasing autonomy and liability of area managers | Internal contracts including explicit targets and incentives | Since 2003 |

Since 2000, NWSC has worked under performance contracts with the national government, each of which covered three years. The contracts contain specific performance indicators, which the NWSC is expected to achieve. For example, the 2003–2006 contract required NWSC to reduce NRW from 39 percent in 2003 to 36 percent in 2006. Simultaneously, inactive connections were required to be reduced from 21 to 13 percent. To encourage management to achieve the targets, an incentive element of 25 percent of the annual basic salary depended on the fulfillment of the contract. Each year the NWSC board decides the appropriate bonus rate that the NWSC management receives.

==== Results and analysis ====
The improvement of NWSC concerning access and operational performance is indisputable. Some of the achievements are:

Performance indicators for NWSC (1998–2012)
| | 1997–98 | 1999–2000 | 2003–04 | 2006–07 | 2007–8 | 2010–11 | 2011–12 | 2012-13 |
|---|---|---|---|---|---|---|---|---|
| Operating profit before depreciation (EBDIT) (USh billion) | 1.5 | 3.0 | 11.0 | 18.0 | 16.0 | 30.4 | 36.1 | 39.8 |
| Non-revenue water | 51% | 43% | 38% | 33% | 33% | 33% | 33% | 34% |
| Collection efficiency | 60% | 76% | 98% | 92% | 92% | 96% | 98% | 96% |
| Connections | 51,000 | 59,000 | 100,000 | 181,000 | 202,000 | 272,400 | 296,200 | 317,300 |
| Employees | 1784 | 1454 | 949 | 1388 | | 1691 | 1773 | 1858 |
| Labor productivity (Employees/1,000 connections) | 35 | 25 | 9 | 8 | | 7 | 6 | 6 |

NWSC has been turned around without a tariff increase, except for inflation adjustments and a 10 percent increase to compensate the utility for a reduction in connection fees. Instead of increasing tariffs, the reforms focused on increasing the number of connections, an effective computerized billing system, improving customer relations and communications, and better incentives and training for staff.

One factor that partially explains the drastically improved collection rates is a government policy instituted in 1999 of paying the unpaid water bills of public entities. The significant increase in new connections is partially explained by a drastic reduction of connection charges, also in 1999, from USh 400,000/= to 25,000/=. Flexibility in technical requirements (such as waiving land title requirements, easing construction standards, and post-processing of new connection forms) was also key to increasing water service coverage in the urban poor communities. Klaas Schwartz has noted that the success of NWSC since 1998 was facilitated by a high level of support from international donors, international lending agencies, and Uganda's national ministries; effective leadership from top management; a highly professional staff; and, strong institutional cultures.

NWSC received ISO 9001:2000 certification for fourteen of its service areas, including Kampala, by June 2008. According to its 2006-07 annual report, NWSC provided training to utilities in Tanzania, Zambi and soon in Nigeria. Building on its success, NWSC's vision was "to be one of the leading water utilities in the world".

Towards the end of 2008, NWSC management introduced another management initiative, codenamed the "Raving Water Fans", aimed at improving customer service and, in the long run, willingness to pay and revenues. The initiative is based on the Raving Fans concept developed by management experts Ken Blanchard and Sheldon Bowles that emphasizes "the 3Ds": deciding what you want, discovering what the customer wants, and delivering plus one percent of what the customer expects.

== Legal framework ==
The current institutional sector framework is based on several policy reforms in the water sector since the mid-1990s. Water supply and sanitation are recognized as key issues under the national PEAP, prepared first in 1997 and revised in 2001 and 2004. The PEAP is the key government document for fighting poverty through rapid economic development and social transformation.

The 1995 Constitution of the Republic of Uganda instructs the Ugandan State to take all practical measures to promote a good water management system at all levels and defines clean and safe water as one of its 29 objectives.

The current legislative water sector framework was introduced with the 1995 Water Statute, which has the following objectives:

- Promotion of rational water use and management
- Promotion of the provision of a clean, safe, and sufficient domestic water supply to all people
- Promotion of the orderly development of water and its use for other purposes, such as irrigation and industrial use, among others, in ways that minimize harmful effects to the environment
- Pollution control and promotion of safe storage, treatment, discharge, and disposal of waste that may cause water pollution or other threats to the environment and human health.

In accordance with the national constitution, chapter eleven, the Local Government Act of 1997 provides for the decentralization of services, including the operation and maintenance of water facilities for local governments in liaison with the ministries responsible for the sector.

Finally, the National Water Policy (NWP), adopted in 1999, promotes the principles of Integrated Water Resources Management, a comprehensive approach to water supply. In addition, the NWP recognizes the economic value of water, promotes the participation of all stakeholders, including women and the poor, in all stages of water supply and sanitation, and confirms the right of all Ugandans to safe water.

== Responsibility for water supply and sanitation ==
=== Policy and regulation ===
The lead agency for formulating national water and sanitation policies, coordinating and regulating the sector is the Ministry of Water and Environment (MWE). The Directorate of Water Development (DWD) under the MWE acts as the executive arm and provides support to local governments and other service providers.

==== Economic and performance regulation ====
There is no independent economic regulatory body for water supply. Tariffs are proposed by NWSC and need to be approved by MWE. NWSC is regulated by contract according to a performance contract with the national government. The Performance Review Committee (PRC) under the MWE reviews the performance of NWSC according to the contract. The PRC, however, is partly financed by the NWSC, which may hinder the full independence of the committee.

NWSC regulates its local branch offices through internal contracts that are monitored by its internal monitoring and regulation department.

==== Environmental regulation ====
Environmental regulation is carried out by the DWD and the National Environment Management Authority.

==== Drinking water quality regulation ====
According to Klaas Schwartz, DWD is expected to monitor the quality of drinking water provided by NWSC. In practice, however, NWSC monitors its drinking water quality internally without any complementary external monitoring. NWSC's internal Quality Control Department examines whether the supplied water complies with the national standards for drinking water, which in turn follow the World Health Organization guidelines. There are a central laboratory in Kampala and satellite laboratories in the other NWSC operation areas. At several sampling points, water is controlled for pH, color, turbidity, residue chlorine, and E. coli. The results are available at the official NWSC website and mostly comply with the national standards. Where NWSC does not provide the service, districts are responsible for water quality monitoring. According to the MWE, this is done insufficiently, and data are scarce.

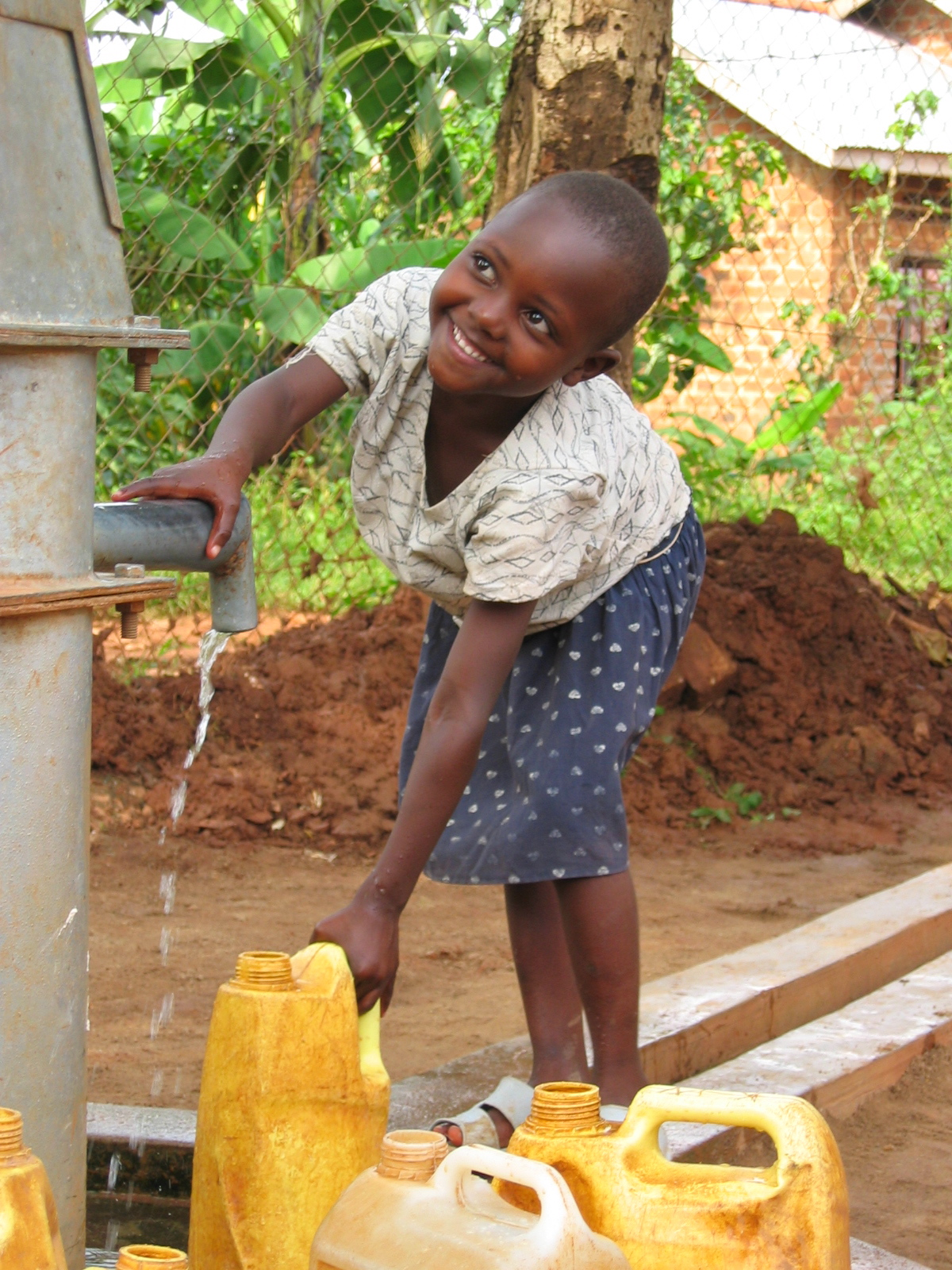
A Ugandan girl at a well

=== Cities and towns ===
In 22 cities and large towns water supply and sewerage - where it exists - is provided by NWSC, a public utility working on a commercial basis. In 2007, it provided services to 1.8 million people out of 2.5 million in Kampala, Jinja/Lugazi, Entebbe, Tororo, Mbale, Lira, Gulu, Masaka, Mbarara, Kabale, Kasese and Fort Portal, Bushenyi/Ishaka, Soroti Arua, Masindi, Malaba, Iganga, Hoima, and Mubende. The smallest town served, Hoima, had a population of only 9,000. The NWSC operates under the MWE.

Besides its performance contracts with the national government and its internal contracts beginning in 2000, NWSC also had two consecutive service contracts for billing and collection (called "management contracts") with foreign companies in Kampala. The first management contract between NWSC and the German company H.P. Gauff Ingenieure started in July 1998 and ended in June 2001. The second contract with the French company OSUL (Ondeo Services Uganda Limited) ran from February 2002 to February 2004. Under both contracts, NWSC's financial and operational indicators continued to improve. The Boston Institute for Developing Economies, however, has claimed that the improvements were not due to private sector participation, but to overall reforms of NWSC initiated before the service contracts were signed and continued while they were being implemented.

=== Small towns ===
In small towns with a population between 5,000 and 30,000, facilities are owned and managed by local governments, supported by the MWE. Many have created Water Authorities, which contract out water services under 3-year contracts to local private operators since about 2000. At the beginning, private participation in small towns faces major challenges such as inexperienced local governments and private operators, limited public spending, and poor user participation.

By 2010, 80 small towns with 35,000 connections were served by private operators. Service quality and user satisfaction have improved after the private operators took over the systems. But according to the Association of Private Water Operators, the contracts are too short to compensate the small, local private operators for their initial efforts in setting up their operations. Due to low tariffs and lack of funding for investments the private operators largely failed to expand the water system to connect the poor. Therefore, in 2005 the International Finance Corporation and the Global Partnership on Output-Based Aid (GPOBA) designed a pilot project to provide performance-based subsidies to private operators to expand access to the poor.

Under the Uganda Water Small Towns and Rural Growth Centers project, private operators are eligible for output-based aid (OBA). Up to 55% of the output-based aid subsidies are paid to the private operators during construction, a second payment is made after successful completion and a last payment after successful operation, all verified by an independent technical auditor. The project expands the management contract approach, addressing some of its flaws. Under the project local governments bid out so-called design-build-operate contracts that include investments and have a duration of 5–10 years. It is carried out in Eastern Uganda in 6 small towns with existing piped water systems (Kamuli, Nawanyago, Palisa, Tirinyi, Nankoma and Busembatia) and 4 so-called rural growth centers that do not have piped water systems yet. New household yard taps and public standpoints for about 45,000 poor beneficiaries are planned. GPOBA approved the project in February 2007 and provided a US$3.28 million grant. The project was initially expected to end in February 2010.

As of 2010, competitively awarded contracts had been signed in all ten localities. Four hundred fifty yard taps have been completed and verified so far, serving 8,100 people, with more under construction. The grant financing per capita is lower than under traditional approaches, and in three towns the winning bidder did not even request any subsidy, relying entirely on the expected tariff revenues to recover its investment and operating costs. In one case, a commercial Ugandan bank provided a loan of $100,000 to the winning bidder to finance the construction works.

Local governments in two towns in the Northern Region, devastated by decades of Civil War, tried to apply this approach in 2009. In Kitgum, a town with 55,000 inhabitants, four bids were received and a contract was awarded in the summer of 2009 with a target to more than double the number of connections and water production, and to triple revenues collected without increasing tariffs in three years. In the much smaller town of Pader with 8,500 inhabitants, four bids were received, but none was responsive so that the town council continued to operate the system.

=== Rural areas ===
In rural areas, local governments at district levels are responsible for the adequate operation and maintenance of water systems. Responsibility for sanitation promotion and hygiene education in communities and schools is vested in the MWE, the Ministry of Health, and the Ministry of Education and Sports.

=== Other functions ===
Besides the MWE, several other national ministries play a role in the sector. The Ministry of Finance, Planning and Economic Development coordinates funding and donor support. The Ministry of Local Government is expected to support decentralized government systems, which manage their own water facilities. The Ministry of Gender, Labour and Social Development is responsible for the promotion of gender-responsive development and community mobilization. The Ministry of Agriculture, Animal Industries and Fisheries oversees water use for irrigation.

Concerning sanitation, the Environmental Health Division under the Ministry of Health is in charge of an integrated sanitation strategy for the country, and the Ministry of Education and Sports is responsible for health, sanitation, and hygiene in schools. All the abovementioned ministries, together with the Ministry of Public Service, development partners, and civil society, form the Water and Sanitation Sector Working Group, which meets quarterly.

== Economic efficiency ==
As described above, the NWSC has substantially improved its operational and financial performance since it was reformed. Indicators show that economic efficiency is also improving in small towns, where the systems are owned by local governments. However, it is difficult to find data on the issue in rural areas.

=== Non-revenue water ===
According to the NWSC, the average share of non-revenue water (NRW) in all operating areas of NWSC was 33 percent in 2010/11. While in Kampala, it was 39 percent, and in the other 21 towns, it averaged 17 percent. These values are about the same as in 2006/07. NWSC blamed the high share of NRW in Kampala on the poor condition of the existing infrastructure. To improve the network and thus reduce NRW in Kampala, the Kampala Network Rehabilitation Project was launched in 2002. In 2002–2003, NRW had been 45 percent in Kampala and 27 percent in the remaining areas. Concerning small towns, the MWE in its 2006 sector performance report indicates that NRW decreased slightly from 24 percent in June 2004 to 22 percent in June 2006.

There is no agreement on appropriate levels of NRW among professionals. Tynan and Kingdom, however, have proposed a best practice target of 23 percent in developing countries. Except for Kampala, the NRW in large and small Ugandan towns, according to the available figures, were better than the target.

=== Labor productivity ===
In 2011, NWSC had 6 employees per 1,000 connections. Back in 1998, there were 36 employees per 1,000 connections. It was significantly reduced to 11 employees in 2003 and 7 in 2007. The MWE indicates an improvement of labor productivity in small towns from 47 employees per 1,000 connections in June 2004 to 28 in June 2006. Tynan and Kingdom propose a best practice target of 5 employees per 1,000 connections in developing countries.

== Financial aspects ==
=== Tariffs and cost recovery ===
Although Uganda's official policy is to promote tariffs that cover all costs, the NWSC tariff actually covers only operation and maintenance costs. According to a 2003 published report, the second performance contract between the government of Uganda and NWSC provided for a tariff policy that in the long term covered operation, maintenance, and a part of the future investments. Although the current tariff structure does recover operation and maintenance costs, the tariffs are not high enough to finance system expansion, leaving system improvement and extension investments to the national government and international donors. According to UN-Water, full cost recovery tariffs including investments would require a significant rise of tariffs. William T. Muhairwe in 2006 asserted that full cost recovery in least developed countries is a myth. According to him, tariffs would have to increase by 90 percent to provide full cost recovery.

In fiscal year 2006–2007, the NWSC tariff for domestic use was US$0.64 per cubic metre. Taken from a public standpipe, the tariff was US$0.42 per cubic metre or less than US$0.01 per jerrycan. The average commercial tariff was US$1.00 per cubic metre. For commercial users, a rising block tariff structure was used. A customer who was connected to the sewerage system would pay an additional charge of 75-100 percent. Although water is cheapest at standpipes, UN-Water reports that in this case users usually have to pay the costs of operating a stand tap and thus in the end pay more. A cross subsidy arrangement enables NWSC to keep in operation systems that do not cover operation and maintenance costs.

=== Investment and financing ===
The amount of investment needed to reach 95 percent access to water supply in 2015 were estimated at US$100 million per year, only slightly more than the estimated actual investment of $85 million in 2006. About 75 percent of investments were financed through external assistance in 2000.

==== 2006/07 investments ====
According to the MWE, the total budget for Ugandan water supply and sanitation was USh 149 billion in fiscal year 2006–2007, of which US$73 million were actually spent. This corresponds to US$2.37 per inhabitant. The NWSC received a budget of US$56 million. Out of the remaining funding of US$34 million, 54 percent was allocated to rural water and 29 percent to urban water.

In addition, NGOs and community-based organizations (CBO)s reported investments of US$5 million in 2006, and NGO and CBO members of the UNICEF-supported Water, Sanitation and Hygiene (WASH) cluster, which provide emergency water supply and sanitation in the Northern Region, and, reported investments of US$15 million from January 2005 to August 2006. Total sector investments in 2006 thus can be estimated at US$85 million.

==== Investment needs ====
Because water supply and sanitation are recognized as key elements of the PEAP, the plan provides for long-term investments in the sector with priority to rural areas. The document indicates that in order to reach 95 percent coverage by 2015, from 2001 to 2015 investments of about US$956 million and US$417 million were needed for rural and urban areas, respectively, corresponding to a total of about US$1.008 billion per year or only US$15 million more than current investment levels.

==== Financing ====
According to UN-Water, around the year 2000, donor financing accounted for up to 75 percent of the total sector funding. The sector benefited significantly from the Poverty Action Fund under the framework of the PEAP. Uganda became the first country to qualify for debt relief under the Heavily Indebted Poor Countries initiative. According to a 2005 report, debt relief contributed about US$80 million per year to the PAF.

Financing conditions differ between urban and rural areas. In the case of the NWSC, concessional debt contracted from international financial institutions had been passed on by the government to the utility in the form of debt. In February 2008, however, the government agreed to convert the NWSC's USh 153.5 billion debt into equity. This was done to increase the NWSC's ability to borrow from the local capital market. A week later, the NWSC announced that it intended to borrow USh 30 billion more on the bond market to finance mitigation of the impact of Lake Victoria's receding levels on water supply. The NWSC expected to be able to borrow in local currency at lower interest rates and for longer maturities compared to borrowing from commercial banks. The World Bank assisted in structuring the bond issue. The Ugandan Ministry of Finance, however, stopped the bond issue from going ahead, citing the need to first use conventional concessional financing sources.

Concerning rural areas, investments are financed primarily by grants. According to the 2000–2015 Rural Water and Sanitation Strategy and Investment Plan, Uganda's principal investment document for rural water supply and sanitation, financing for the rural sector continued to be provided by external donors, the national government, and NGOs.

Ninety-seven percent of investments in sanitation were funded by external aid. For the period 2010–2015. the government budgeted US$0.4 million for sanitation, corresponding to 0.01 percent of gross domestic product. This compares unfavorably to a commitment by African Water Ministers made at the Africasan conference in 2008 in the eThekwini declaration in which they aspired that budget allocations for sanitation and hygiene "should be a minimum of 0.5% of GDP".

Overall, funding by the national government was expected to increase from 25 percent in 2000 to 75 percent.

== External cooperation ==
Uganda receives external support from several donor agencies. In 2002, a Sector-Wide Approach (SWAp) was adopted for the water and sanitation sector. Under the SWAp most development partners have agreed to channel their financing through the national budget. According to a 2006 report by UN-Water, the SWAp has led to the increased confidence of development partners and has proved to be the most appropriate mechanism for resources mobilization and program implementation.

=== Joint Water and Sanitation Sector Programme Support ===
The Joint Water and Sanitation Sector Programme Support, which follows a Sector-Wide Approach, is aligned with Uganda's 2004 Poverty Eradication Action Plan. Altogether, US$150 million were to be spent under the program, which started in 2008 and was expected to run for five years. The major development partner involved in the program was the Danish International Development Agency, which alone provided US$66 million. The other partners were the African Development Bank (US$27 million), the Austrian Development Agency (US$19 million), the Swedish International Development Cooperation Agency (US$14 million), the UK's Department for International Development (US$10 million), the EU (US$9 million), the German Deutsche Gesellschaft für Technische Zusammenarbeit, and the GermanKfW (US$6 million). The program aimed to support the achievement of the sector targets. It intended to serve about 1,410,000 people in rural areas, 373,000 people in rural growth centers (RGCs) (communities with a population between 2,000 and 5,000 people), and 155,000 in small towns directly with water and to give them access to basic sanitation and hygiene facilities. Besides the extension of water supply and sanitation in rural areas, RGCs, and small towns, the program included the following components: water resources management, sector program support for capacity building, and sector reforms and water for production.

=== African Development Fund ===
In 2005, the African Development Fund decided to contribute US$61 million to the rural water supply and sanitation program. Another US$118 million are provided by the Government of Uganda, and US$39 million are financed by NGOs, several other development partners, and directly by the communities. The program, which lasts for 4 years, aims to rehabilitate existing water supply schemes and provide new ones in rural areas. Furthermore, it seeks to provide new sanitation facilities in public places, schools, and health centers. These physical efforts are accompanied by environmental assessments, mitigation, and monitoring, as well as community development and capacity building. Finally, the program provides for institutional support for the central ministries in order to enable them to efficiently carry out their tasks.

=== European Union ===
The European Union contributed €14.75 million to the Mid-Western Towns Water and Sanitation Project. Under the project, which was implemented between 2001 and 2007, water supply and sanitation facilities in the towns of Masindi, Hoima, and Mubende districts were rehabilitated and extended.

=== World Bank ===
The World Bank has been active for decades in Uganda. For instance, the bank approved its seventh Poverty Reduction Support Credit in 2008, under which it intended to provide US$200 million from May 2008 to September 2009, supporting Uganda's third Poverty Eradication Action Plan.

==== Water Supply Project ====
From 1990 to 1998, the Water Supply Project was carried out under the framework of an urban water program. Its objectives were to improve public health, enable increased production of goods and services, prevent environmental pollution, and ease women's burden through the expansion and improvement of water supply and sanitation facilities. In Kampala, Jinja, Masaka, Mbarara, and Mbare, the project supported physical and institutional components to expand the system and strengthen the NWSC. In addition, water meters were installed to prevent water waste. The World Bank contributed US$60 million to the project.
