= Katosi =

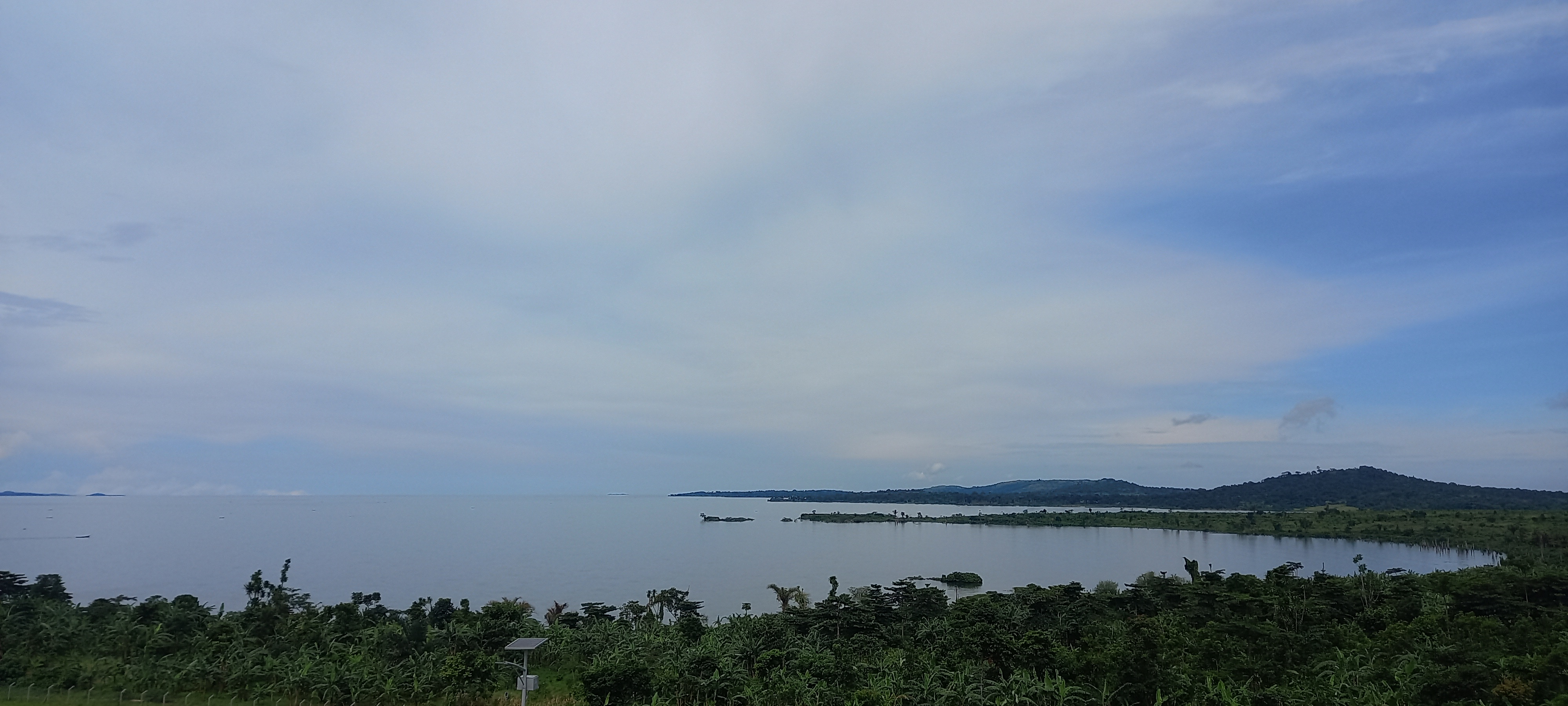

- Location in Uganda
- Coordinates: 00°09′10″N 32°48′05″E
- Country: Uganda
- Region: Central Region
- District: Mukono District
- Elevation: 3,717 ft (1,133 m)

Population (2015 Estimate)
  - Total: 16,442

Katosi is a town in the Mukono District of the Central Region of Uganda. The town is an urban center under Mukono District Administration.

== Location ==
Katosi is located approximately 29 kilometres (18 mi), by road, south-east of Mukono, the location of the district headquarters. This location is along the northern shore of Lake Victoria, approximately 52 kilometres (32 mi), by road, southeast of Kampala, the capital and largest city of Uganda.

The geographical coordinates of Katosi are 0°09'10.0"N, 32°48'05.0"E (Latitude:0.152778; Longitude:32.801389). The town's average elevation is approximately 1,133 metres (3,717 ft) above sea level.

== Overview ==
Traditionally, Katosi was a fishing village and a landing site for water craft transporting people and merchandise between Koome Island in Mukono District and the Buvuma Islands in neighboring Buvuma District and the mainland. During the last decade of the 20th century and in the first decade of the 21st century, Katosi became a major fishing center, with the majority of the catch exported to Europe and the Middle East. As the fishing village has increased in economic importance, the human population has increased as well.

Katosi has a high population of AIDS orphans and widows.

== Recent developments ==
In 2011, the National Water and Sewerage Corporation (NWSC), the government parastatal responsible for water supply and sanitation, announced plans to build a water treatment plant in Katosi, capable of supplying 120,000 cubic meters (120,000,000 L) of purified water daily. The new water plant will cost approximately US$306 million and will supply mainly the rapidly growing towns of Mukono and Kira Town.

== Population ==
As of January 2015, the estimated population of Katosi was 16,442.

== Points of interest ==
The following points of interest lie within or near Katosi:

- Offices of Katosi Intercomunity Development Alliance (KIDA), an NGO
- Offices of Katosi Town Council
- Offices of Katosi Women Development Trust (KWDT), an NGO
- Offices of Katosi Women Fishing & Development Association (KWFDA), another NGO
- The site where National Water and Sewerage Corporation built the Katosi Water Treatment Plant.
- Katosi Landing Site
- Katosi Fish Market
- Katosi Central Market

== See also ==
- Uganda National Roads Authority
- Katosi Water Works
