= Silver Mugisha =

Ugandan engineer and corporate executive

- Born: September 14, 1968 (age 57); Kantunda Village, Bushenyi District, Uganda
- Citizenship: Uganda
- Education: Makerere University (Bachelor of Science in Civil Engineering) (Doctor of Philosophy in Economics and Management); IHE Delft Institute for Water Education (Master of Science in Sanitary Engineering)
- Occupations: Civil engineer and corporate executive
- Years active: 1994–present
- Title: Managing director and CEO of National Water and Sewerage Corporation

Silver Mugisha, is a Ugandan civil engineer and corporate executive, who serves as the managing director and chief executive officer of the National Water and Sewerage Corporation (NWSC), since August 2013. Before that, he served as the chief manager responsible for Institutional Development and External Services at the NWSC.

== Background and education ==
Mugisha was born in Kantunda Village, Bushenyi District, in the Western Region of Uganda, on 14 September 1968. His father, Federico Ngambagye and mother, Pascazia Baryomurwera Ngambagye, were both alive as of February 2015. After attending primary school locally he attended St. Joseph's Secondary School in the city of Mbarara for his O-Level education, and St. Leo's College, Kyegobe in Fort Portal for his A-Level studies.

He was admitted to Makerere University, Uganda's largest and oldest public university, on a scholarship from the Ugandan government. He graduated with a Bachelor of Science in Civil Engineering degree. He went on to obtain a Master of Science in Sanitary Engineering degree, from the IHE Delft Institute for Water Education, in Delft, Netherlands. He then returned to Makerere where he was awarded a Doctor of Philosophy in Economics and Management.

== Career ==
Mugisha joined NWSC in 1994. In 1997, he became one of the senior engineers at the company. In 2013, he was appointed as managing director and chief executive officer of the company. Over the more than 30 years he has been at the company, he has gained experience in water utility management, international water policy, water and sewerage research, and advisory services.

In an interview that he gave to ESI-Africa in 2016, Mugisha attributed his success and that of NWSC to several factors, including the prioritization of service, the customer and the welfare of the employee above profit.

== Governance scrutiny and corruption-related allegations ==
Mugisha's tenure at the National Water and Sewerage Corporation (NWSC) has been the subject of media reporting and public scrutiny over governance, procurement, recruitment and internal management issues. According to Uganda Radio Network, the Inspectorate of Government raised concerns about the recruitment process that led to Mugisha’s appointment as NWSC managing director in 2013, after receiving a complaint alleging irregularities. The Inspectorate recommended a fresh recruitment process, although it noted that its recommendations were not binding on the NWSC board.

In 2019, The Spy Uganda reported that a whistleblower petition had asked the State House Anti-Corruption Unit to investigate Mugisha and other NWSC officials over alleged abuse of office and financial management concerns. A 2020 report by The Capital Times said then Speaker of Parliament, Rebecca Kadaga had questioned Mugisha over concerns about corruption and accountability at NWSC during a water and sanitation conference.

In December 2021, the Inspectorate of Government said it would reopen an investigation into the procurement of faulty NWSC prepaid water meters, which were reportedly valued at Shs17 billion. The Inspector General of Government, Beti Kamya, also said the matter would be reopened, amid whistleblower allegations linking the procurement dispute to claims of influence and internal promotions at NWSC.

In 2022, Daily Express reported that some NWSC employees had raised complaints in a dossier alleging unfair salary scales, preferential treatment and irregularities in appointments and promotions. Mugisha and NWSC rejected the claims, saying salary adjustments were based on performance appraisals and exceptional performance.

Another June 2025 report by Red Pepper said the Inspectorate of Government had called for action against Mugisha over corruption-related allegations at NWSC. Mugisha later rejected the allegations, saying NWSC remained open to accountability while dismissing the claims as distractions from the corporation’s work.

== Other considerations ==
Mugisha has sat on the boards of several public and private enterprises. He is the current chairperson of the Uganda Business and Technical Examinations Board. He is the current chairperson of the Federation of Uganda Employers, elected in March 2021. His other responsibilities include as the first African vice president of the International Water Association (IWA). He is the former president of the African Water and Sanitation Association (AfWASA) and the chairman of the governing council of Uganda Technical College, Bushenyi.
