= Badru Kiggundu =

Ugandan civil engineer, academic and consultant

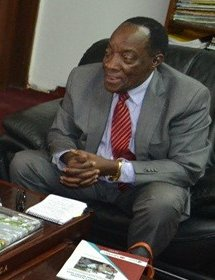
- Born: 1945 (age 80–81); Nkozi Hospital, Mpigi District, Uganda
- Education: University of New Mexico (BSc in Civil Engineering) (PhD in Geomaterials); Carnegie Mellon University (MSc in Civil Engineering)
- Occupations: Civil engineer, academic, consultant, chancellor of Busitema University

Badru Malimbo Kiggundu is a Ugandan civil engineer, academic and consultant, who serves as the chancellor of Busitema university, and chairman of the presidential select committee responsible for the supervision of the successful completion of both Isimba Hydroelectric Power Station and Karuma Hydroelectric Power Station. He was appointed to that position by Yoweri Museveni, the president of Uganda in August 2016. He concurrently serves as the chairman of the board of directors of National Water and Sewerage Corporation. He was appointed to that position on 20 July 2020, replacing Christopher Ebal, whose contract expired.

He served as the chairman of the Electoral Commission of Uganda, for 14 consecutive years, from 2002 until 2016.

== Background and education ==
He was born in 1945 to the late Hajji Yonus Luswa, (d. 1997) and the late Hajati Kabugo Namatovu (d. 2006). Kiggundu is one of the 23 children fathered by Hajji Luswa.

He attended Kabasanda Primary School for his elementary schooling. He then transferred to Kibuli Secondary School for his O-Level studies. In 1964, he won a full scholarship from the government of Buganda, to pursue his A-Level studies at Nabumali High School in Mbale District, graduating from there in 1965.

Another scholarship saw him enroll in the University of New Mexico, graduating with a Bachelor of Science degree in Civil Engineering. He continued his studies at Carnegie Mellon University, graduating in 1971, with a Master of Science in civil engineering. In 1981, he obtained a Doctor of Philosophy from the University of New Mexico.

== Career ==
=== In the United States ===
For a period of six years, from 1971 until 1977, Kiggundu served as an engineer and executive with the National Housing and Construction Company, a government parastatal company, where he was responsible for road construction.

After completing his doctoral studies in 1981, he was hired by the University of New Mexico as a research scientist, working in that capacity for six years. In 1987, Auburn University in Alabama hired him as a research program manager and assistant professor in civil engineering. He worked in that capacity until 1988, when he returned to Uganda.

=== Academia ===
Kiggundu currently serves as the chancellor for Busitema University in Eastern Uganda, having been appointed by H.E. Yoweri Kaguta Museven, the president of the Republic of Uganda.

Kiggundu worked in the private construction industry for two and a half years after his return to Uganda in 1988.

In 1991, Makerere University hired him as a member of the academic staff in the department of civil engineering. In 1993, he rose to the rank of head of department. From 1999 until 2002, he served as the dean of the Faculty of Technology. He left Makerere in 2002 at the rank of associate professor.

=== Electoral Commission ===
During the fourteen years that Kiggundu spent at the helm of Uganda Electoral Commission, the commission oversaw three general elections, in 2006, 2011 and 2016. In 2006 and 2016, the presidential election results were challenged in Uganda's Supreme Court, but in both cases, the Court ruled in favour of the incumbent president, Yoweri Museveni.

=== Chairman of committee on dams ===
In August 2016, Kiggundu was appointed by the president of Uganda to chair a seven-person committee to oversee the completion of two hydroelectric power projects that were under construction: the 600 megawatts Karuma Hydroelectric Power Station and the 183 megawatts Isimba Hydroelectric Power Station.

== Family ==
Kiggundu is married and is the father of eleven children, with three consorts.

== See also ==
Stephen Besweri Akabway
